= Nik Johnson =

British Labour Co-op politician, Mayor of Cambridgeshire and Peterborough

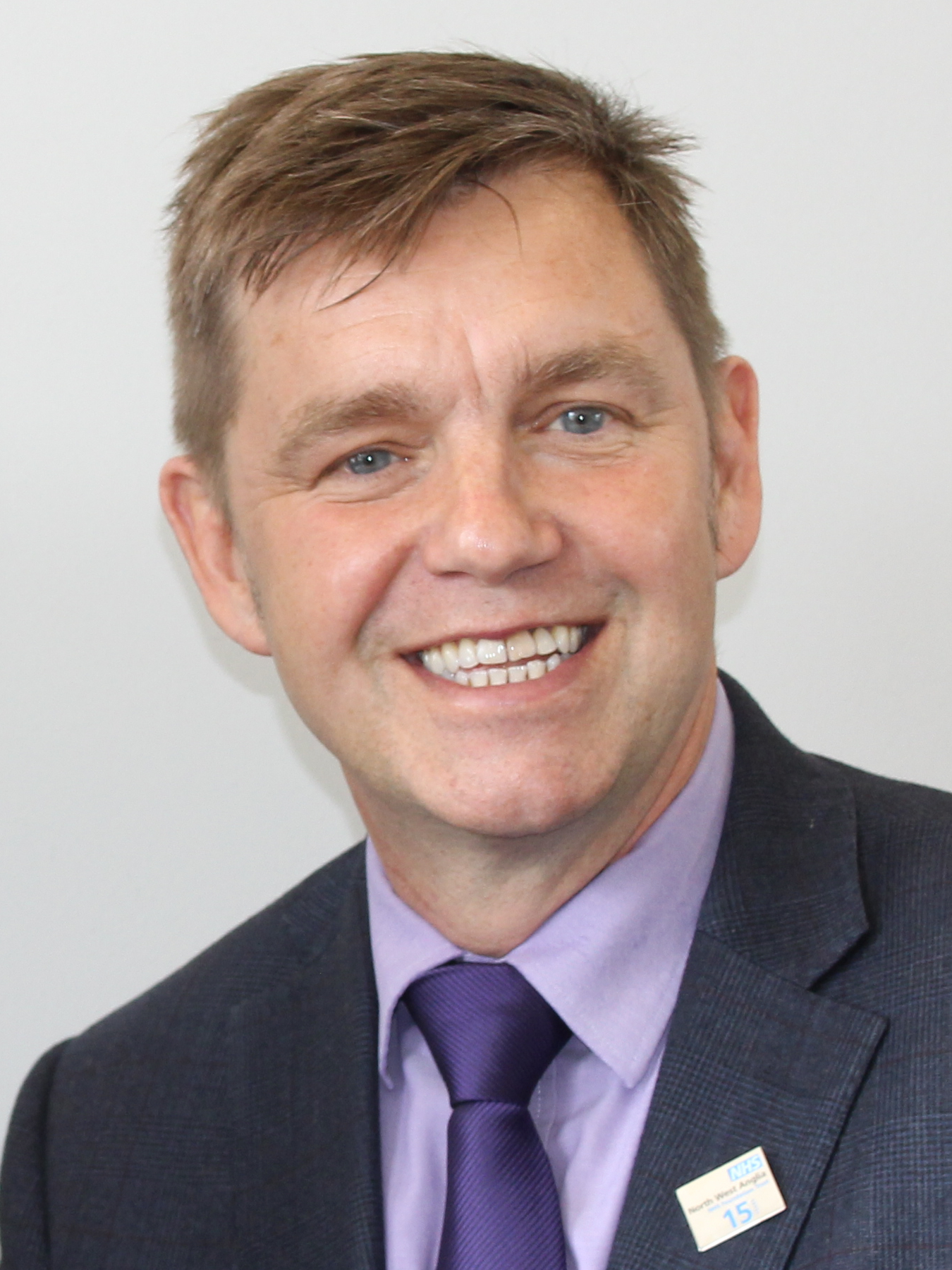
- Johnson in 2022

Mayor of Cambridgeshire and Peterborough
- In office 10 May 2021 – 4 May 2025
- Preceded by: James Palmer
- Succeeded by: Paul Bristow

Huntingdonshire District Councillor for St Neots East
- In office 3 May 2018 – 10 May 2021
- Preceded by: New seat
- Succeeded by: Benjamin Pitt

Personal details
- Born: Nik Johnson; 1969 (age 56–57) Northumberland, North East England, UK
- Party: Labour Co-op
- Spouse: Donna McShane
- Children: 3
- Education: St George's, University of London

Nik Johnson (born 1969) is a British Labour Co-op politician and paediatrician who served as the mayor of Cambridgeshire and Peterborough from 2021 to 2025.

== Early life and medical career ==
Nik Johnson was born in Northumberland in 1969. He grew up in Hexham, Northumberland, and trained as a doctor at St George's Hospital Medical School, qualifying in 1993. He has worked as a paediatrician at Hinchingbrooke Hospital since 2007.

Johnson had an interest in politics from an early age, growing up in the 1980s he was aware of the societal changes in the UK (particularly in the industrial areas of North East England). Johnson started campaigning for Labour alongside his role as a junior doctor not long after qualifying.

== Early political career ==
=== Labour candidate and councillor ===
Johnson stood as the Labour Party candidate in the 2015 general election for the Huntingdon constituency. He came second with 18.3% of the vote. In 2017, he sought selection to be Labour's candidate in the inaugural Cambridgeshire and Peterborough mayoral election but was not shortlisted. Later in that year, Johnson stood again as the Labour candidate for Huntingdon in the 2017 general election. He came second again, increasing his share of the vote to 30.9% and cutting the majority by 10.5%.

He unsuccessfully stood for election to Huntingdonshire District Council and Cambridgeshire County Council on six occasions from 2012 to 2017, before being elected as a Huntingdonshire district councillor for St Neots East in 2018.

=== 2021 Cambridge and Peterborough mayoral election ===
Johnson was selected to be the Labour candidate by a vote of local party members in November 2020, beating the Cambridge city councillor Katie Thornburrow. In his campaign, he said would introduce bus franchising, alongside rebranding buses and providing free or subsidised bus travel to young people. He also said he would seek government funding to build more council houses. He also proposed renaming the combined authority to "Greater Cambridgeshire". Despite having stood as "Dr Nik Johnson" in four previous elections to public office, he was prevented from using his title on the ballot paper for this election.

Johnson was elected to the role of Mayor of Cambridgeshire and Peterborough in the 2021 mayoral election. Upon taking office, he became entitled to the style of Mayor. In the first round, he came in second place with 32.8% of the vote. He won in the second round when he received 72.7% of transferred second preferences from the eliminated Liberal Democrat candidate. Residents of Johnson's village, Great Gransden, stood on the street and applauded his victory. He said he would continue to work half a day each week as a paediatrician.

On 7 February 2025, Johnson announced that he would not be seeking re-election and saying it was "a step too far" and the heavy physical toll the role had taken on him. The Labour Party had not run a candidate adoption process by that date.

== Mayor of Cambridge and Peterborough ==
=== Travel and Transport ===
==== Change of direction ====
In his first week in office, Johnson cancelled plans for the Cambridgeshire Autonomous Metro project that James Palmer, his Conservative predecessor, had supported. After suspending work on the proposed autonomous metro, Johnson commissioned a new transport plan focused on areas that have suffered from deprivation and equality, and on reducing carbon emissions.

==== Transport: rail ====
He arranged for the combined authority to provide £350,000 to support investment in Peterborough railway station in August 2021.

During his first year in office, he officially launched the re-opened Soham station making sure that his predecessor James Palmer, who had been responsible for much of the project, was in attendance at the opening ceremony. The station had been a victim of the Beeching cuts 56 years before.

In March 2023, the bid to the Levelling up Fund secured almost £48m of government funding to be delivered in £5m instalments to regenerate Peterborough's station quarter. The project, with additional funding from Peterborough City Council and other partners, is expected to cost about £65m in total.

In July 2023, the Rail Delivery Group announced plans to close nearly all station ticket offices. Johnson teamed with other directly elected mayors in England to make a legal challenge to this move. Johnson said: “Staffed, accessible ticket offices are an essential part of the rail network and must be protected. We’re making our views known to the train operators, objecting to their proposals for widespread closures". The campaign was successful resulting in Mark Harper, then Secretary of State for Transport, announcing that the Government was expecting the Train Operators to withdraw the proposals.

==== Active and sustainable travel ====
The UK's transport minister, Chris Heaton-Harris, initially withheld funding for active travel in the region, which Johnson secured by offering his commitments to active travel and beginning the process to appoint an independent cycling tsar.

In December 2023, Olympic gold medallist Chris Boardman, England’s active travel commissioner at the time, visited Cambridge to see the work going on in the county to get more people out of their cars. Johnson and the commissioner cycled the Chisholm Trail and took the guided busway from Cambridge North railway station to the new town of Northstowe to see for themselves some of the active travel infrastructure being designed from the ground up to serve the community. It was reported that "Active Travel England has given the Combined Authority and its partners a high rating for active travel ambition and delivery of projects, including the pedestrian and cycling footbridge at Peterborough’s busy Nene Parkway."

In March 2024, a local cycling campaigner, Mike Gough, tragically died in a collision with a van. Johnson paid tribute to Gough saying that amongst other things, Gough had inspired him to become interested in cycling. Johnson repledged himself to Vision Zero saying that the tragic death of his friend would not be forgotten. Johnson said that the Combined Authority had "pivoted" to ensure active travel within the county is a "high priority" and viewed through the lens of public health. After the election of a Labour Government in July 2024, the inaugural meeting of metro mayors and Prime Minister at 10 Downing Street saw Johnson wearing a cycling pin in memory of his friend.

Johnson welcomed reports of how E-scooter trials in the Cambridge area had taken nearly a million car trips off the roads, remarking that "It's important that e-scooter safety continues to improve, but the fact that the trial may get another two years will please many people in Cambridge - and a possible extension to communities outside the city could be exciting news for many villagers.".

==== Transport: buses ====
===== More buses, more routes, cheaper fares and the mayoral precept =====
In March 2023, a new fleet of electric buses for Cambridge was launched with the full 30 due to be in operation by May that year. The buses are mainly operating on the Park & Ride routes. The new buses are funded by the Cambridgeshire and Peterborough Combined Authority, Department for Transport, Greater Cambridge Partnership (GCP) and Stagecoach East. Johnson said it was "marking a turning point for public transport in the region".

In August 2024, new bus routes and increased frequencies funded by the mayoral precept started to be announced by bus operators including increased frequencies on the Cambridgeshire Guided Busway and new routes and boosted services in the East and North of the county. However, some of the new routes have been delayed because of legal difficulties in contract negotiation.

As well as new routes, Nik Johnson has worked to retain routes when bus operators cut services for example the Number 9 bus between Littleport and Cambridge

In other moves to keep bus travel affordable, Johnson proposed to keep the £2 bus fare cap until the end of March 2025 and that from May 2025 concessionary bus pass holders will be entitled to all-day free travel in the region.

In 2023, Johnson added the mayoral precept to council tax bills in the Cambridge and Peterborough area. The precept added £12 a year to a Band D Council tax bill. The charge was explained as needed to provide further subsidies to bus routes that might otherwise have been cancelled by providers for not being profitable. In 2024, the precept was increased to £36 per year for a Band D household. At the start of 2025, Johnson announced that he would freeze the precept for the following financial year.

===== The move to the Tiger network =====
In May 2024, Johnson launched the 'Tiger Pass', a free pass that entitles those under 25 to travel on buses in the Combined Authority area for a flat fare of £1. Over 2,500 were applied for in the first week after launch, with over 17,000 applications received by August that year.

In December 2024, Johnson launched the 'Tiger on Demand' bus service, a way of providing public transport in more rural areas and part of the move towards branding local public transport 'Tiger'. The service is available in West Huntingdonshire. Additional areas to be launched include: Fenland, East Cambridgeshire and South Cambridgeshire.

===== The road to franchising =====
At a board meeting of the Combined Authority in July 2024, it was agreed to consult on full bus franchising for Cambridgeshire & Peterborough.

The public consultation, held from August to November, saw 63 per cent of more than 1,600 respondents back franchising. Johnson announced that franchising was going to happen and signed the papers in early February 2025. Johnson said it was the "most significant and exciting reform of our region’s bus network in forty years".

==== Transport: roads ====
Although Johnson is prioritising the development of public and ‘active’ transport modes, he also recognises that the private car remains a key mode for many residents across Cambridgeshire and Peterborough. Examples include: improvements to the A141 at St Ives, a new bridge at Kings Dyke to remove delays at a level crossing and in Peterborough at the A1260 Nene Parkway Junction 3.

In December 2024, Johnson welcomed an additional £10 million of funding from the UK Government to fix potholes in the region's roads.

=== Work, growth and skills ===
In June 2021, Johnson made sure that all combined authority staff were paid a living wage and started discussions with trade unions.

Backing for skills training: In July 2021, the combined authority agreed to provide £1,800,000 of new funding to train more than 800 people starting in March 2022. In September 2023, the Combined Authority agreed to invest £2m in a Carbon Net Zero centre at the College of West Anglia in Wisbech which is about half the monies required. During Care Leavers week in November 2023, it was announced that 100 care leavers had benefited from a bursary set up by the Cambridgeshire and Peterborough Combined Authority to fund education and training to support their futures. In August 2024, £280k+ of grants were awarded to support the lifelong learning and skills offer for adults in Cambridgeshire and Peterborough including for those with low skills or complex needs.

Johnson is keen to back innovation to drive growth and skilled employment. Examples include £3.5m of Combined Authority funding for Agricultural technology at the National Institute of Agricultural Botany research centre in Histon. In November 2024, together with the Mayor of Greater Manchester Andy Burnham Johnson, opened The Glasshouse, a new centre in Hills Road, Cambridge for science and tech firms to share ideas and expertise.

In December 2024, Johnson visited the Construction Hub at Cambridge Regional College where £2.5m of Combined Authority grant is supporting training in general construction skills and trades, including carpentry, electrical, and bricklaying and he spoke about giving "learners the best possible start on their journey to the working world".

=== Health ===
Johnson's work as a paediatrician gave him a strong understanding of the difficulties for families where a son or daughter has a learning disability and led him to become a patron of Eddies, a local Cambridgeshire charity delivering projects for people with a learning disability and their families.

Dr Johnson is a co-chair of the Health Devolution Commission, an independent cross-party and cross-sector body working to champion and support the successful implementation of devolved and integrated health and social care services across England.

Early in his term, Johnson appointed a board member with responsibility for Public Health in the Combined Authority region. The initial holder of the post is Councillor Chris Boden.

In September 2024 Johnson was one of nine UK metro mayors who together with Jamie Oliver pledged to stop junk-food advertising and prioritise children’s health.

=== Culture and community ===
In June, Johnson announced a plan to submit a bid for the combined authority to become the UK City of Culture focused on Peterborough, Cambridge and Ely. However, he did not make a bid, citing the impact of the COVID-19 pandemic on culture in the region and a lack of time to prepare a good enough bid.

In August 2021, he won the support of the combined authority to provide £1.1m to a development project in the town of March in order to prevent it losing a government grant of several more millions of pounds.

=== Other issues ===
On 14 November 2023 he was found to have breached the authority’s code of conduct in relation to “civility” and “disrepute” for which he was asked to make a written apology.

The Conservative leaders of East Cambridgeshire District Council and Fenland District Council continued to raise the matters that had been investigated and resolved. In March 2024, they were warned by the Combined Authority's legal officer that they were putting the Authority at risk of a legal challenge.

Johnson faced attacks from other Conservative opponents, this led in November 2024 to two Conservative county councillors being found by a conduct committee hearing to have made “immensely discourteous and uncivil” remarks about him that "fell below the standard required of members in relation to accuracy and fairness”. In further action at the start of 2025 the Combined Authority banned one of the councillors concerned from holding any positions for a year (the other councillor having voluntarily withdrawn from the Authority).

=== Elections contested ===
==== UK Parliament elections ====
Date of election	Constituency	Party	Votes	%	Result	Ref
2015	Huntingdon	Labour	10,248	18.3	Not elected (2nd)	
2017	Huntingdon	Labour	18,440	30.9	Not elected (2nd)	

==== Mayoral elections ====
Date of election	Mayoralty	Party	First round	First round %	Second round	Second round %	Result	Ref
2021	Cambridgeshire and Peterborough	Labour Co-op	76,106	32.8	113,994	51.3	Elected	

==== Cambridgeshire County Council elections ====
Date of election	Constituency	Party	Votes	%	Result	Ref
2013	Huntingdon	Labour	721	22.4	Not elected (3rd)	
2016 by-election	St Neots Eaton Socon and Eynesbury	Labour	625	19.3	Not elected (3rd)	
2017	Huntingdon North and Hartford	Labour	532	21.1	Not elected (3rd)	

==== Huntingdonshire District Council elections ====
Date of election	Constituency	Party	Votes	%	Result	Ref
2012	St Neots Eaton Ford	Labour	239	15.2	Not elected (3rd)	
2014	Gransden and The Offords	Labour	381	24.1	Not elected (2nd)	
2016	St Neots Eynesbury	Labour	404	21.7	Not elected (3rd)	
2018	St Neots East	Labour	345	40.4	Elected	

== Personal life ==
Johnson is married to Donna McShane and has three children.

From November 2022 he took four months leave of absence from his mayoral duties while he underwent heart surgery and recuperation under surgeons at Papworth Hospital.
