= 2021 Cambridgeshire and Peterborough mayoral election =

2021 local election in England, UK

- 6 May 2021
- Turnout: 37.0%
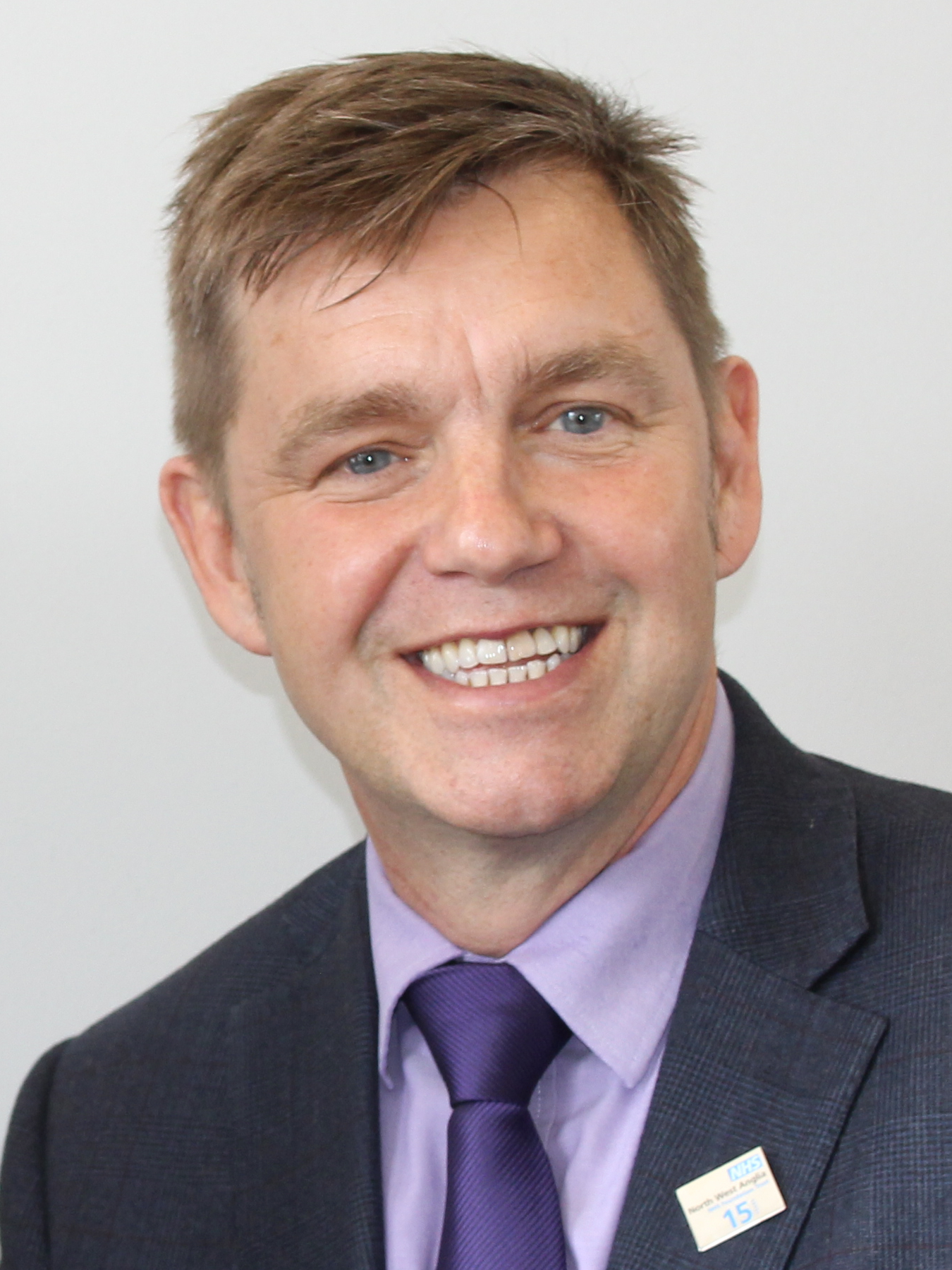

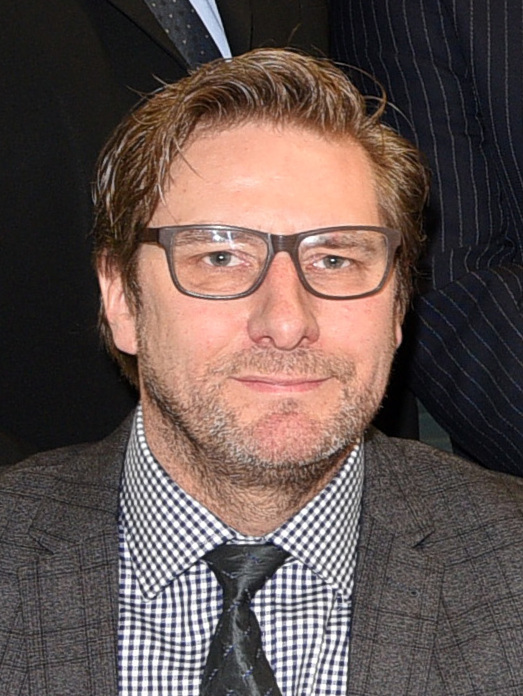
| Candidate | Nik Johnson | James Palmer | Aidan Van de Weyer |
| Party | Labour Co-op | Conservative | Liberal Democrats |
| First round | 76,106 | 93,942 | 61,885 |
| Percentage | 32.8% | 40.5% | 26.7% |
| Swing | ▲14.2pp | ▲2.5pp | ▲3.2pp |
| Second round | 113,994 | 108,195 | Eliminated |
| Percentage | 51.3% | 48.7% | Eliminated |
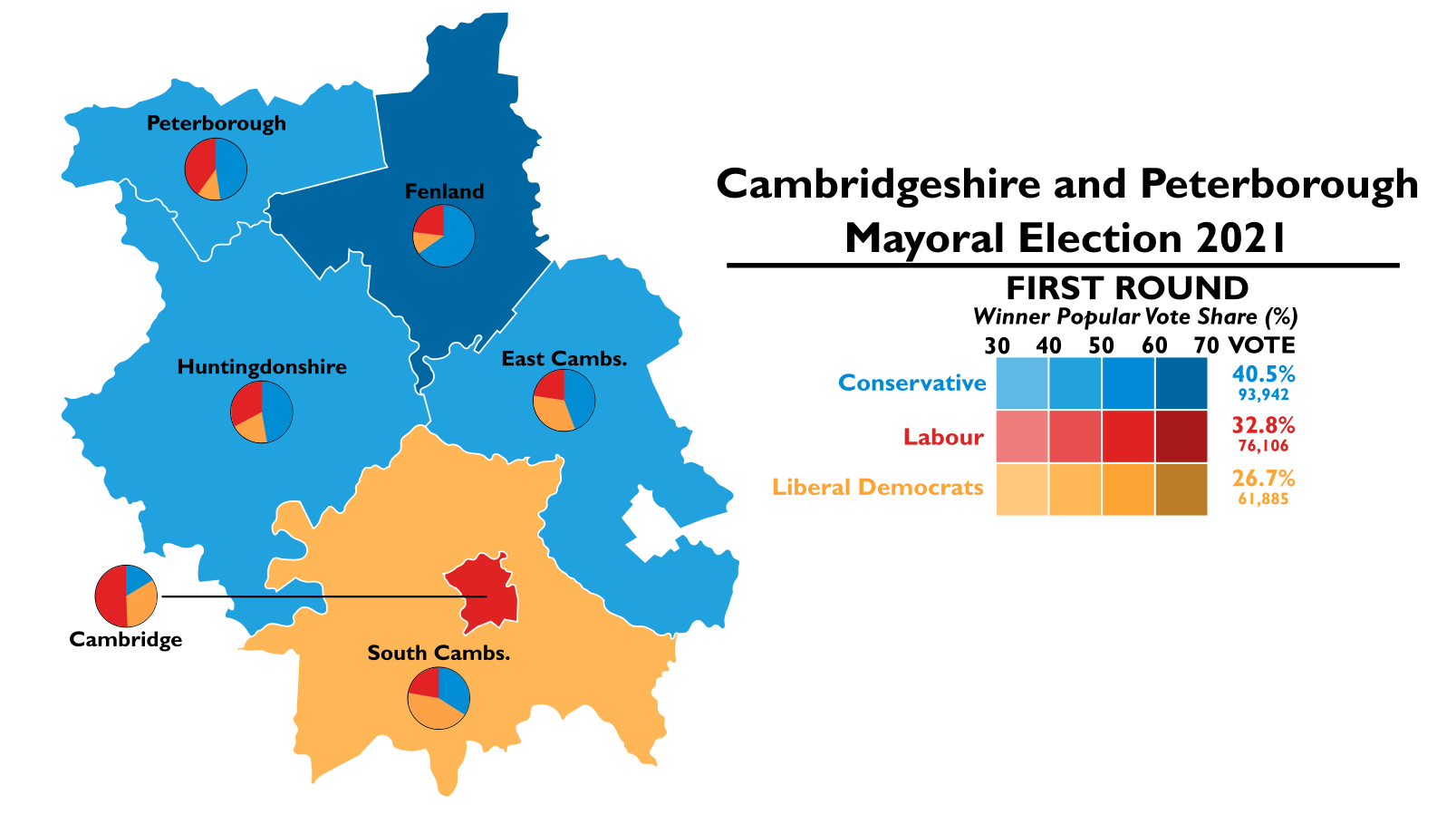
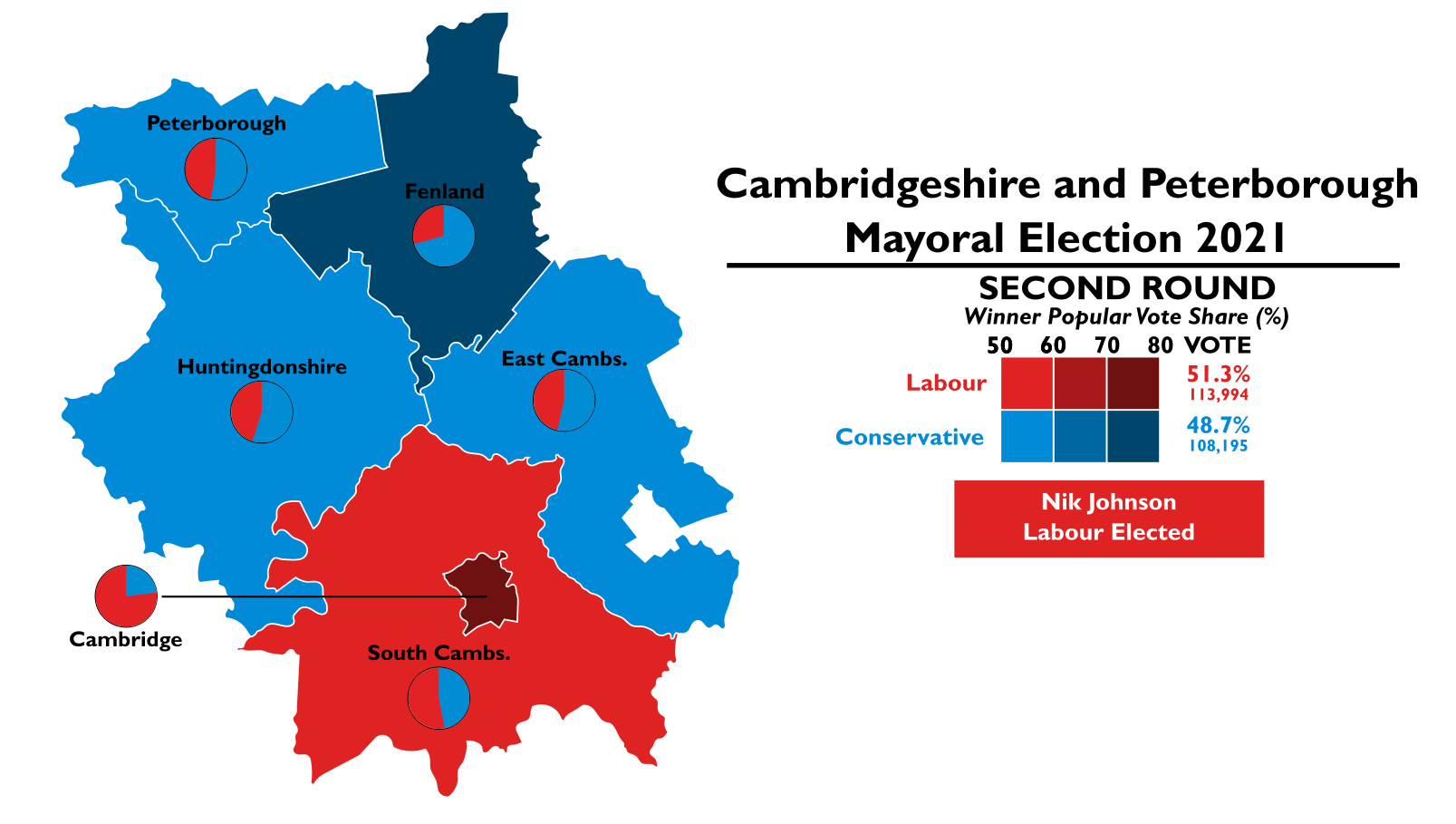
Mayor before election
James Palmer
Conservative
Elected mayor
Nik Johnson
Labour

The 2021 Cambridgeshire and Peterborough mayoral election was held on 6 May 2021 to elect the mayor of Cambridgeshire and Peterborough.

The supplementary vote system was used to elect the mayor for a four-year term of office. Subsequent elections will be held in May 2025 and every four years thereafter. The election was held alongside a full election for Cambridge City Council, the Cambridgeshire Police and Crime Commissioner, Cambridgeshire County Council and one-third of Peterborough City Council and a number of District and parish by-elections.

== Background ==
Area of the Cambridgeshire and Peterborough Combined Authority

The mayor of Cambridgeshire and Peterborough serves as the directly elected leader of the Cambridgeshire and Peterborough Combined Authority. The mayor has power over investment directly to the combined authority from the government of £20 million a year for 30 years from 2017. The mayor does not incorporate the Cambridgeshire Police and Crime Commissioner into the post.

In the 2017 Cambridgeshire and Peterborough mayoral election, the Conservative candidate James Palmer was elected with 38.0% of the vote in the first round and 56.9% of the second round vote. The Liberal Democrat candidate Rod Cantrill came in second place with 23.5% of the first round vote and 43.1% of the second round vote, with Labour in third place with 18.6% of the first round vote.

== Electoral system ==
The election used a supplementary vote system, in which voters may express a first and second preference for candidates. As there are only three candidates, the process would proceed:

- If a candidate receives more than 50% of the first preference vote, that candidate wins
- If no candidate receives more than 50% of first preference votes, the candidate in third place will be eliminated and their votes redistributed according to second preference votes to the remaining two candidates
- The candidate who then has the highest overall total of votes cast is declared the Elected Mayor.

== Candidates ==
Three candidates stood for election. The Green Party announced that they would not field a candidate in order to focus on council elections.

=== Conservative Party ===
James Palmer was standing for re-election. He was previously a leader of East Cambridgeshire District Council.

=== Labour Party ===
Nik Johnson, a children's doctor at Hinchingbrooke Hospital, was their candidate. He had been the party's parliamentary candidate for Huntingdon in 2015 and 2017, and has served as a district councillor since 2018. He defeated Cambridge city councillor Katie Thornburrow in a vote of party members in November 2020.

=== Liberal Democrats ===
Aidan Van de Weyer, the deputy leader of South Cambridgeshire District Council, was their candidate.

== Campaign ==
Palmer, the Conservative candidate, supported a proposed Cambridgeshire Autonomous Metro project that would connect towns and villages across Cambridgeshire and Peterborough using driverless pods. The Liberal Democrat candidate, Aidan Van de Weyer, opposed the project and the Labour candidate, Nik Johnson, said he would cancel the whole project. Van de Weyer and Johnson opposed plans considered by Palmer to build new garden villages to help fund the metro project.

Palmer said he was delivering bus franchising. Van de Weyer and Johnson also supported bus franchising, and Van de Weyer said Palmer's claims about progressing the process were "hollow" given a lack of progress. All three candidates opposed the construction of an incinerator in Wisbech.

== Results ==
The Liberal Democrat candidate was eliminated in the first round. The Labour and Conservative candidates received the second preference votes. The close race was not finally decided until the Peterborough votes were announced and despite a large vote for the Conservative candidate in Fenland district the outcome was a Labour win.

=== Overall ===
First round results of the mayoral election

Second round results of the mayoral election

2021 Cambridgeshire and Peterborough mayoral election
| Party | Candidate | 1st round | | 2nd round | | | 1st round votesTransfer votes, 2nd round |
| Party | Candidate | Total | Of round | Transfers | Total | Of round | 1st round votesTransfer votes, 2nd round |
|---|---|---|---|---|---|---|---|
| Labour Co-op | Nik Johnson | 76,106 | 32.8% | 37,888 | 113,994 | 51.3 | |
| Conservative | James Palmer | 93,942 | 40.5% | 14,253 | 108,195 | 48.7 | |
| Liberal Democrats | Aidan Van der Weyer | 61,885 | 26.7% | | | | |
| Turnout | | 231,933 | 37.0% | | | | |

=== By local authority ===
==== Cambridge ====
2021 Cambridgeshire and Peterborough mayoral election (Cambridge)
| Party | Candidate | 1st round | | 2nd round | | | 1st round votesTransfer votes, 2nd round |
| Party | Candidate | Total | Of round | Transfers | Total | Of round | 1st round votesTransfer votes, 2nd round |
|---|---|---|---|---|---|---|---|
| Labour Co-op | Nik Johnson | 19,585 | 50.7% | 8,875 | 28,460 | 76.9% | |
| Liberal Democrats | Aidan Van der Weyer | 12,787 | 33.1% | | | | |
| Conservative | James Palmer | 6,284 | 16.3% | 2,260 | 8,544 | 23.1% | |
| Turnout | | 38,656 | 41.1% | | | | |

==== East Cambridgeshire ====
2021 Cambridgeshire and Peterborough mayoral election (East Cambridgeshire)
| Party | Candidate | 1st round | | 2nd round | | | 1st round votesTransfer votes, 2nd round |
| Party | Candidate | Total | Of round | Transfers | Total | Of round | 1st round votesTransfer votes, 2nd round |
|---|---|---|---|---|---|---|---|
| Conservative | James Palmer | 10,408 | 44.3% | 1,444 | 11,852 | 53.6% | |
| Liberal Democrats | Aidan Van der Weyer | 7,779 | 33.1% | | | | |
| Labour Co-op | Nik Johnson | 5,323 | 22.6% | 4,929 | 10,252 | 46.4% | |
| Turnout | | 23,510 | 35.8% | | | | |

==== Fenland ====
2021 Cambridgeshire and Peterborough mayoral election (Fenland)
| Party | Candidate | 1st round | | 2nd round | | | 1st round votesTransfer votes, 2nd round |
| Party | Candidate | Total | Of round | Transfers | Total | Of round | 1st round votesTransfer votes, 2nd round |
|---|---|---|---|---|---|---|---|
| Conservative | James Palmer | 14,494 | 65.2% | 780 | 15,274 | 70.0% | |
| Labour Co-op | Nik Johnson | 5,129 | 23.1% | 1,228 | 6,357 | 30.0% | |
| Liberal Democrats | Aidan Van der Weyer | 2,593 | 11.7% | | | | |
| Turnout | | 22,216 | 29.7% | | | | |

==== Huntingdonshire ====
2021 Cambridgeshire and Peterborough mayoral election (Huntingdonshire)
| Party | Candidate | 1st round | | 2nd round | | | 1st round votesTransfer votes, 2nd round |
| Party | Candidate | Total | Of round | Transfers | Total | Of round | 1st round votesTransfer votes, 2nd round |
|---|---|---|---|---|---|---|---|
| Conservative | James Palmer | 21,824 | 47.3% | 2,707 | 24,531 | 54.9% | |
| Labour Co-op | Nik Johnson | 15,142 | 32.8% | 4,997 | 20,139 | 45.1% | |
| Liberal Democrats | Aidan Van der Weyer | 9,199 | 19.9% | | | | |
| Turnout | | 46,165 | 34.8% | | | | |

==== Peterborough ====
2021 Cambridgeshire and Peterborough mayoral election (Peterborough)
| Party | Candidate | 1st round | | 2nd round | | | 1st round votesTransfer votes, 2nd round |
| Party | Candidate | Total | Of round | Transfers | Total | Of round | 1st round votesTransfer votes, 2nd round |
|---|---|---|---|---|---|---|---|
| Conservative | James Palmer | 22,465 | 47.7% | 1,703 | 24,168 | 52.5% | |
| Labour Co-op | Nik Johnson | 18,889 | 40.1% | 2,946 | 21,835 | 47.5% | |
| Liberal Democrats | Aidan Van der Weyer | 5,776 | 12.3% | | | | |
| Turnout | | 47,130 | 33.9% | | | | |

==== South Cambridgeshire ====
2021 Cambridgeshire and Peterborough mayoral election (South Cambridgeshire)
| Party | Candidate | 1st round | | 2nd round | | | 1st round votesTransfer votes, 2nd round |
| Party | Candidate | Total | Of round | Transfers | Total | Of round | 1st round votesTransfer votes, 2nd round |
|---|---|---|---|---|---|---|---|
| Liberal Democrats | Aidan Van der Weyer | 23,751 | 43.8% | | | | |
| Conservative | James Palmer | 18,467 | 34.0% | 5,359 | 23,826 | 46.9% | |
| Labour Co-op | Nik Johnson | 12,038 | 22.2% | 14,933 | 26,971 | 53.1% | |
| Turnout | | 54,256 | 45.0% | | | | |

== Aftermath ==
Johnson was elected mayor and repeated his commitments to introducing bus franchising. He cancelled plans for an autonomous metro system that he described as having "all the hallmarks of being an expensive folly and a potential financial black hole".

Palmer said he would leave politics following his defeat. Tim Wotherspoon, a Conservative councillor who lost his seat in the concurrent county council election, said Palmer "had it coming". Van der Weyer stood down as the deputy leader of South Cambridgeshire District Council to "recharge [his] batteries" after the campaign.

== See also ==
- 2021 Cambridgeshire County Council election
- 2021 Cambridgeshire police and crime commissioner election
