= 2013 Cambridgeshire County Council election =

2013 UK local government election

- 2 May 2013

All 69 seats to Cambridgeshire County Council 35 seats needed for a majority
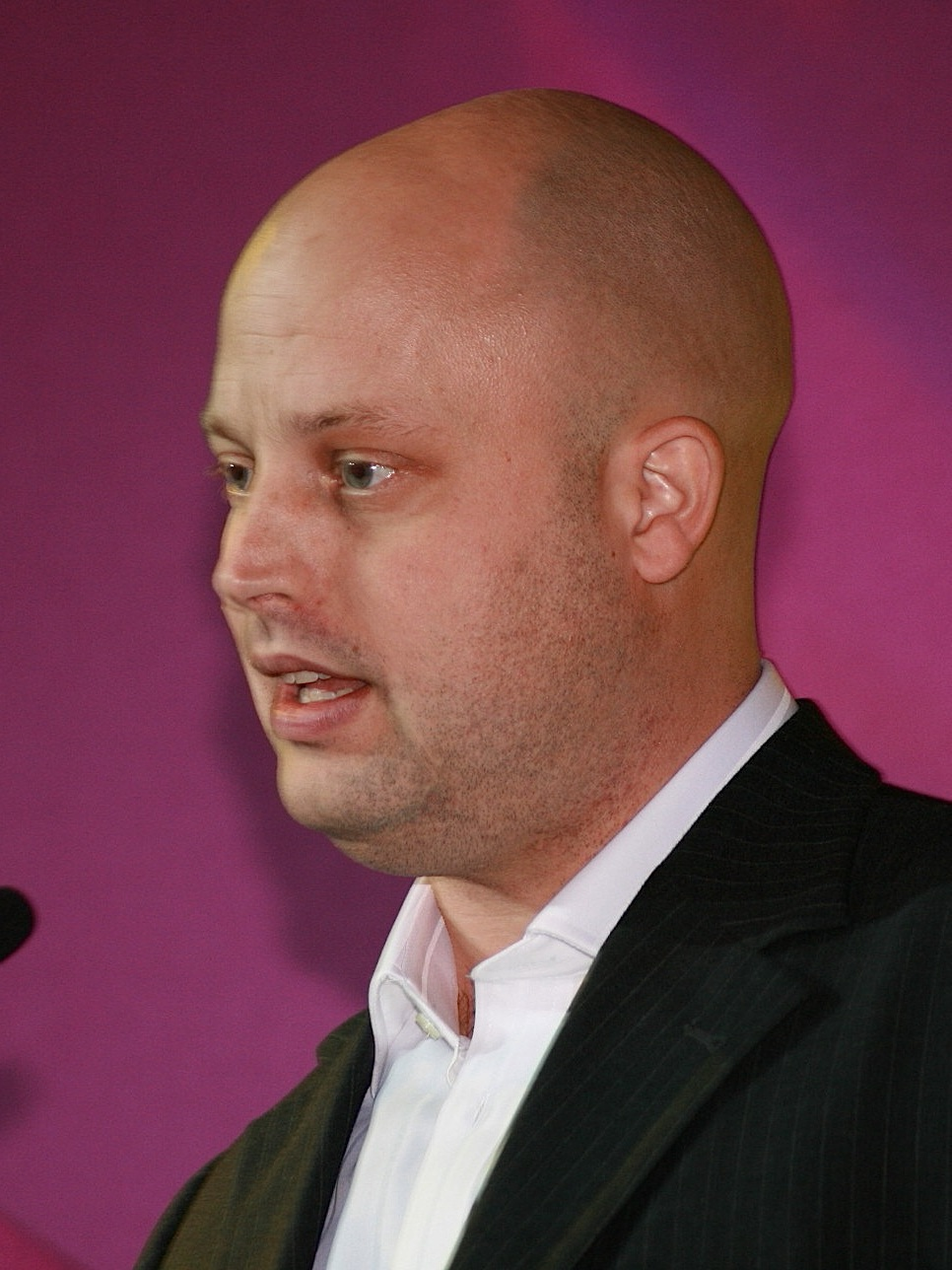

	First party	Second party	Third party
	Con	Lib
Leader	Nick Clarke	Kilian Bourke	Peter Reeve
Party	Conservative	Liberal Democrats	UKIP
Leader since	May 2011	17 June 2011	23 July 2009
Leader's seat	Fulbourn (Defeated)	Romsey	Ramsey
Last election	42 seats, 43.4%	23 seats, 33.8%	1 seat, 3.9%
Seats before	39	21	2
Seats won	32	14	12
Seat change	▼10	▼9	▲11
Popular vote	47,661	31,397	29,240
Percentage	32.6%	21.5%	20.0%
Swing	▼10.8%	▼12.3%	▲16.1%
	Fourth party	Fifth party	Sixth party
Leader	Tariq Sadiq	N/a	N/a
Party	Labour	Independent	St. Neots Ind.
Leader since	June 2009
Leader's seat	Coleridge (Retiring)
Last election	2 seats, 9.9%	0 seats, 2.7%	Did not contest
Seats before	3	3	0
Seats won	7	2	2
Seat change	▲5	▲2	▲2
Popular vote	26,053	4,902	2,452
Percentage	17.8%	2.8%	1.4%
Swing	▲7.9%	▲0.6%	▲1.4%
- Map showing the results of the 2013 Cambridgeshire County Council elections.
Council control before election
Conservative
Council control after election
No Overall Control

An election to Cambridgeshire County Council took place on 2 May 2013 as part of the 2013 United Kingdom local elections. 69 councillors were elected from 60 electoral divisions, which returned either one or two county councillors each by first-past-the-post voting for a four-year term of office. The electoral divisions were the same as those used at the previous election in 2009. No elections were held in Peterborough, which is a unitary authority outside the area covered by the County Council. The election saw the Conservative Party lose overall control of the council.

All locally registered electors (British, Irish, Commonwealth and European Union citizens) who were aged 18 or over on Thursday 2 May 2013 were entitled to vote in the local elections. Those who were temporarily away from their ordinary address (for example, away working, on holiday, in student accommodation or in hospital) were also entitled to vote in the local elections, although those who had moved abroad and registered as overseas electors cannot vote in the local elections. It is possible to register to vote at more than one address (such as a university student who has a term-time address and lives at home during holidays) at the discretion of the local Electoral Register Office, but it remains an offence to vote more than once in the same local government election.

== Previous composition ==
=== 2009 election ===
Party	Seats
Conservative	42
Liberal Democrats	23
Labour	2
Green	1
UKIP	1
Total	69

=== Composition of council seats before election ===
Party	Seats
Conservative	39
Liberal Democrats	21
Labour	3
Independent	3
UKIP	2
Green	1
Total	69

=== Changes between elections ===
In between the 2009 election and the 2013 election, the following council seats changed hands:

Division	Date	Previous Party	New Party	Cause	Resulting Council Composition					
Division	Date	Previous Party	New Party	Cause	Con	LDem	Lab	Grn	UKIP	Ind
Ramsey	23 July 2009	Vacant	UKIP	Election postponed due to the death of a candidate.	42	23	2	1	1	0
Bourn	Early 2010	Conservative	Independent	Sitting councillor loses Whip.	41	23	2	1	1	1
Petersfield	29 November 2010	Liberal Democrats	Independent	Councillor quit party to sit as an independent member.	41	22	2	1	1	2
Arbury	5 May 2011	Liberal Democrats	Labour	Liberal Democrat incumbent resigned. Labour won by-election.	41	21	3	1	1	2
Little Paxton and St Neots North	3 September 2011	Conservative	Independent	Sitting councillor loses Whip.	40	21	3	1	1	3
Bourn	8 March 2012	Independent	UKIP	Sitting councillor joined UKIP.	40	21	3	1	2	2
St Neots Eaton Socon and Eynesbury	1 February 2013	Conservative	Independent	Councillor quit party to sit as an independent member.	39	21	3	1	2	3

== Summary ==
In total, 292 candidates stood in the election. Only the Labour Party and the Conservative Party contested all 69 seats on the council. The Liberal Democrats stood 61 candidates, not standing in four divisions in Fenland and only contesting one seat in some two-member divisions. The United Kingdom Independence Party stood 52 candidates, including a full slate in Huntingdonshire, although two nominated candidates in Fenland withdrew before the deadline and did not appear on the ballot. The Green Party stood 25 candidates, mostly in Cambridge and South Cambridgeshire. The English Democrats stood two candidates in Whittlesey, while the Trade Unionist and Socialist Coalition stood two candidates in the Godmanchester & Huntingdon East division. The Official Monster Raving Loony Party stood two candidates in St Ives and in Bar Hill divisions, and one candidate stood for the Cambridge Socialists in Romsey. There were also nine independent candidates.

=== Election result ===
Cambridgeshire County Council election, 2013
Party	Candidates	Seats	Gains	Losses	Net gain/loss	Seats %	Votes %	Votes	+/−
Conservative	69	32	5	15	−10	46	33.6	59,129	−12.0
Liberal Democrats	61	14	2	11	−9	20	19.7	34,588	−14.0
UKIP	52	12	11	0	+11	17	21.1	37,132	+17.8
Labour	69	7	5	0	+5	10	17.4	30,632 (Note: Includes Labour Co-operative)	+8.3
Independent	7	2	2	0	+2	2.9	2.8	4,902	+0.6
St. Neots Ind.	2	2	2	0	+2	2.9	1.4	2,452	+1.4
Green	25	0	0	1	−1	0	3.3	5,873	−1.6
English Democrat	2	0	0	0	0	0	0.3	584	N/A
Monster Raving Loony	2	0	0	0	0	0	0.1	225	−0.2
TUSC	2	0	0	0	0	0	0.1	148	N/A
Cambridge Socialists	1	0	0	0	0	0	0.1	118	N/A
Total	292	69						175,783	

Popular vote
Conservative	33.6%
UKIP	21.1%
Liberal Democrats	19.7%
Labour	17.4%
Green	3.3%
Others	4.9%

Council seats
Conservative	46.38%
Liberal Democrats	20.29%
UKIP	17.39%
Labour	10.14%
Independent	2.90%
St. Neots Ind	2.90%

The United Kingdom Independence Party made substantial gains, taking 11 seats from the Conservatives, mostly in Fenland and northern Huntingdonshire. Southern Huntingdonshire saw the Conservatives lose a seat to the Liberal Democrats in the Godmanchester & Huntingdon East division, as well as two seats to independents in the St Neots Eaton Socon & Eynesbury division. The Labour Party gained seats in Cambridge from the Liberal Democrats and the Green Party, including Arbury, which Labour had won in a 2011 by-election, winning half of the city's 14 county council divisions. In East Cambridgeshire, the Conservatives gained both divisions in Ely from the Liberal Democrats but lost Littleport to UKIP. In South Cambridgeshire, Conservative council leader Nick Clarke lost his seat in Fulbourn to the Liberal Democrats. The Liberal Democrats, however, lost four other seats in the district, including in Linton, where the Conservative candidate won by a single vote.

=== Election of Group Leaders ===
Martin Curtis (Whittlesey North) was elected leader of the Conservative Group, Maurice Leeke (Waterbeach) challenged the incumbent Kilian Bourke (Romsey) for the leadership of the Liberal Democratic Group and won, and Paul Sales (Arbury) was elected leader of the Labour Group. In mid 2015, deputy Lib Dem leader Lucy Nethsingha (Newnham) was elected leader and deputy leader Ashley Walsh (Petersfield) replaced Sales as Labour leader.

In December 2013 Peter Reeve (Ramsey) stood down as UKIP group leader to be replaced by Paul Bullen (St Ives) with Simon Bywater (Sawtry and Ellington) as his deputy.

=== Election of Leader of the Council ===
Martin Curtis, the leader of the conservative group, was duly elected leader of the council and formed a conservative minority administration.

After less than a year as leader Curtis resigned and was succeeded by Steve Count (March North)

=== Aftermath ===
In addition, the council structure will switch from a cabinet system to a committee system, starting from May 2014.

== Results by District ==
=== Cambridge ===
==== Summary ====
Cambridge District Summary
Party	Seats	+/-	Votes	%	+/-
Labour	7	▲5	11,081	39.4	+18.4
Liberal Democrats	6	▼5	8,445	30.0	−6.7
Independent	1	▲1	1,024	3.6	+1.6
Conservative	0	Steady	4,045	14.4	−7.3
Green	0	▼1	2,470	8.8	−6.8
UKIP	0	Steady	933	3.3	+1.9
Cambridge Socialists	0	Steady	118	0.4	−1.3
Total	14	Steady	28,116	100.0	

==== Division results ====
Abbey
Party	Candidate	Votes	%	±%
Labour	Joan Whitehead	926	53.37	+24.1
Green	Brett Hughes	321	18.50	−22.1
Conservative	David Smith	296	17.06	−0.1
Liberal Democrats	Christopher Brown	192	11.07	−1.9
Majority		605	34.87	+23.6
Turnout		1,735	26.1	−6.5
Labour gain from Green		Swing	+23.1	

Arbury
Party	Candidate	Votes	%	±%
Labour	Paul Sales *	947	48.6	+19.7
Liberal Democrats	Daniel Levy	331	17.0	−25.0
UKIP	Hugh Mennie	246	12.7	n/a
Conservative	Ali Meftah	226	11.6	−4.3
Green	Stephen Lawrence	195	10.0	−3.2
Majority		616	31.7	+18.7
Turnout		1,977	29.0	−11.9
Labour gain from Liberal Democrats		Swing	+22.3	

Castle
Party	Candidate	Votes	%	±%
Independent	John Hipkin	781	41.0	+11.3
Liberal Democrats	Belinda Brooks-Gordon *	620	32.6	−10.5
Labour	Edward Browne	317	16.7	+8.9
Conservative	Richard Jeffs	109	5.7	−4.8
UKIP	Nicholas Wilson	76	4.0	n/a
Majority		161	8.5	−4.9
Turnout		1,912	29.3	−8.0
Independent gain from Liberal Democrats		Swing	+10.9	

Cherry Hinton
Party	Candidate	Votes	%	±%
Labour	Sandra Crawford	1,150	58.3	+16.1
Conservative	Timothy Haire	453	23.0	−8.4
Green	Megan Parry	214	10.9	−2.4
Liberal Democrats	William Barter	155	7.9	−5.3
Majority		697	35.3	+24.6
Turnout		1,998	31.4	−7.5
Labour hold		Swing	+12.3	

Coleridge
Party	Candidate	Votes	%	±%
Labour	Noel Kavanagh	1,071	53.9	+17.6
Conservative	Sam Barker	347	17.5	−15.0
UKIP	Bill Kaminski	272	13.7	+7.5
Green	Shaun Esgate	149	7.5	−4.8
Liberal Democrats	Thomas Yates	148	7.4	−5.3
Majority		724	36.4	+32.6
Turnout		1,990	30.6	−10.6
Labour hold		Swing	+16.3	

East Chesterton
Party	Candidate	Votes	%	±%
Liberal Democrats	Ian Manning *	1,147	45.9	+10.1
Labour	Clare Blair	832	33.3	+18.3
UKIP	Peter Burkinshaw	221	8.8	−0.9
Conservative	Tom Kerby	160	6.4	−18.4
Green	Peter Pope	140	5.6	−9.1
Majority		315	12.6	+1.6
Turnout		2,509	37.5	+1.4
Liberal Democrats hold		Swing	−4.1	

King's Hedges
Party	Candidate	Votes	%	±%
Labour	Fiona Onasanya	716	48.9	+22.8
Liberal Democrats	Neale Upstone	281	19.2	−20.0
Independent	Ian Tyes	243	16.6	n/a
Conservative	Anette Karimi	224	15.3	−7.6
Majority		435	29.7	+16.6
Turnout		1,487	23.5	−9.1
Labour gain from Liberal Democrats		Swing	+21.4	

Market
Party	Candidate	Votes	%	±%
Liberal Democrats	Edward Cearns	475	33.1	−11.6
Labour	Dan Ratcliffe	434	30.2	+17.6
Green	Simon Sedgwick-Jell *	268	18.7	−2.5
Conservative	Sheila Lawlor	258	18.0	−3.5
Majority		41	2.9	−20.4
Turnout		1,452	22.7	−4.5
Liberal Democrats hold		Swing	−14.6	

Newnham
Party	Candidate	Votes	%	±%
Liberal Democrats	Lucy Nethsingha *	797	43.2	−3.1
Labour	Peter Sarris	661	35.8	+21.6
Conservative	Jonathan Farmer	230	12.5	−9.7
Green	Tom Watkins	150	8.6	−8.8
Majority		136	8.0	−16.2
Turnout		1,854	27.9	−6.2
Liberal Democrats hold		Swing	−12.4	

Petersfield
Party	Candidate	Votes	%	±%
Labour	Ashley Walsh	943	55.9	+26.2
Liberal Democrats	Keith Edkins	270	16.0	−25.8
Green	Sandra Billington	267	15.8	+1.2
Conservative	Linda Yeatman	206	12.2	−1.7
Majority		673	39.9	+27.9
Turnout		1,697	28.3	−10.0
Labour gain from Liberal Democrats		Swing	+26.0	

Queen Edith's
Party	Candidate	Votes	%	±%
Liberal Democrats	Amanda Taylor	1,188	44.8	−11.5
Labour Co-op	John Beresford	931	35.1	+27.7
Conservative	Tom Bygott	361	13.6	−10.5
Green	William Birkin	172	6.5	−5.7
Majority		257	9.7	−22.5
Turnout		2,662	40.2	−2.0
Liberal Democrats hold		Swing	−19.6	

Romsey
Party	Candidate	Votes	%	±%
Liberal Democrats	Kilian Bourke *	1,118	47.9	+13.5
Labour	Martin Smart	741	31.7	+11.3
Green	Hywel Sedgwick-Jell	138	5.9	−6.4
UKIP	Marjorie Barr	118	5.1	+1.1
Cambridge Socialists	Tom Woodcock	118	5.1	−12.6
Conservative	Andrew Bower	103	4.4	−6.8
Majority		377	16.1	+2.2
Turnout		2,344	36.8	+0.0
Liberal Democrats hold		Swing	+1.1	

Trumpington
Party	Candidate	Votes	%	±%
Liberal Democrats	Barbara Ashwood	763	38.7	−5.0
Conservative	John Ionides	735	37.3	+1.2
Labour	Peter Snow	239	15.9	+4.6
Green	Ceri Galloway	236	12.4	−0.9
Majority		28	1.4	−6.2
Turnout		2,070	34.5	−5.3
Liberal Democrats hold		Swing	−3.1	

West Chesterton
Party	Candidate	Votes	%	±%
Labour	Jocelynne Scutt	1,046	40.9	+25.3
Liberal Democrats	David Grace	960	37.6	−8.1
Conservative	James Strachan	337	13.2	−7.4
Green	Shayne Mitchell	212	8.3	−9.8
Majority		86	3.4	−21.7
Turnout		2,573	41.1	−0.1
Labour gain from Liberal Democrats		Swing	+16.8	

=== East Cambridgeshire ===
==== Summary ====
East Cambridgeshire District Summary
Party	Seats	+/-	Votes	%	+/-
Conservative	8	▲1	9,509	44.2	−7.0
UKIP	1	▲1	4,728	22.0	+22.0
Liberal Democrats	0	▼2	3,952	18.4	−21.7
Labour	0	Steady	2,950	13.7	+7.1
Green	0	Steady	382	1.8	+1.8
Total	9	Steady	21,521	100.00	

==== Division results ====
Burwell
Party	Candidate	Votes	%	±%
Conservative	David Brown *	893	46.1	−1.5
Liberal Democrats	Charlotte Cane	394	20.3	−26.1
UKIP	Michael Banahan	374	19.3	n/a
Labour	Liz Swift	277	14.3	+8.4
Majority		499	25.7	+24.6
Turnout		1,942	30.2	−14.5
Conservative hold		Swing	+12.3	

Ely North and East
Party	Candidate	Votes	%	±%
Conservative	Mike Rouse	1,086	39.8	−5.4
Liberal Democrats	Nigel Bell *	612	22.4	−24.7
UKIP	Peter Dawe	482	17.7	n/a
Labour	Clem Butler	385	14.1	+6.3
Green	Robert Edwards	166	6.1	n/a
Majority		474	17.4	+15.4
Turnout		2,743	32.0	−6.0
Conservative gain from Liberal Democrats		Swing	+9.7	

Ely South and West
Party	Candidate	Votes	%	±%
Conservative	Anna Bailey	973	38.5	−3.7
Liberal Democrats	Sue Austen *	712	28.2	−23.8
UKIP	Jeremy Tyrrell	441	17.5	n/a
Labour	Ruth Barber	275	10.9	+5.1
Green	Andrew Allen	126	5.0	n/a
Majority		261	10.3	+0.5
Turnout		2,534	37.4	−5.2
Conservative gain from Liberal Democrats		Swing	+10.1	

Haddenham
Party	Candidate	Votes	%	±%
Conservative	Bill Hunt *	1,292	49.3	−2.0
UKIP	Mark Higginson	538	20.5	n/a
Liberal Democrats	Gareth Wilson	463	17.7	−26.9
Labour	Rob Bayley	239	9.1	+5.0
Green	Gemma Bristow	90	3.4	n/a
Majority		754	28.8	+22.0
Turnout		2,624	33.9	−9.1
Conservative hold		Swing	−11.3	

Littleport
Party	Candidate	Votes	%	±%
UKIP	Daniel Divine	475	35.8	n/a
Conservative	Fred Brown *	389	29.3	−24.9
Liberal Democrats	Neil Morrison	260	19.6	−18.3
Labour	Edna Simms	202	15.2	+7.4
Majority		86	6.5	−9.9
Turnout		1,334	20.3	−8.3
UKIP gain from Conservative		Swing	+30.4	

Soham and Fordham Villages (2 seats)
Party	Candidate	Votes	%	±%
Conservative	James Palmer *	2,064	44.7	−14.2
Conservative	Joshua Schumann	1,623		
UKIP	Dick Bourne	1,364	29.6	n/a
UKIP	John Howlett	1,198		
Labour	Mike Swift	597	12.9	+5.9
Liberal Democrats	Charles Warner	588	12.8	−21.3
Labour	Chris Horne	499		
Liberal Democrats	Chika Akinwale	319		
Majority		700	15.2	−9.7
Turnout		8,252	22.3	−8.9
Conservative hold		Swing	−21.9	
Conservative hold		Swing		

Sutton
Party	Candidate	Votes	%	±%
Conservative	Philip Read *	817	49.4	+3.9
Liberal Democrats	Lorna Dupre	542	32.8	+8.9
Labour	Peter Allenson	295	17.8	+10.7
Majority		275	16.6	−5.0
Turnout		1,694	25.7	−13.2
Conservative hold		Swing	−2.5	

Woodditton
Party	Candidate	Votes	%	±%
Conservative	Mathew Shuter *	1,327	60.2	+5.6
Labour	Steven O'Dell	466	21.1	+14.6
Liberal Democrats	Jennifer Liddle	411	18.7	−20.2
Majority		861	39.1	+23.3
Turnout		2,241	28.1	−15.3
Conservative hold		Swing	+23.3	

=== Fenland ===
==== Summary ====
Fenland District Summary
Party	Seats	+/-	Votes	%	+/-
Conservative	6	▼5	8,458	39.7	−11.8
UKIP	5	▲5	6,262	29.4	+20.7
Labour	0	Steady	3,005	14.1	+3.4
Liberal Democrat	0	Steady	2,034	9.6	−10.4
Independent	0	Steady	957	4.5	−2.7
English Democrats	0	Steady	584	2.7	+1.7
Total	11	Steady	21,300	100.00	

==== Division results ====
Chatteris
Party	Candidate	Votes	%	±%
UKIP	Sandra Rylance	584	34.8	n/a
Conservative	Mark Buckton	579	34.5	−15.7
Liberal Democrats	Josephine Ratcliffe	358	21.3	−21.6
Labour	Ann Beevor	159	9.5	+2.6
Majority		5	0.3	−7.0
Turnout		1,689	27.6	−11.6
UKIP gain from Conservative		Swing	+25.2	

Forty Foot
Party	Candidate	Votes	%	±%
Conservative	David Connor	845	39.3	+0.6
UKIP	David Kelley	681	31.7	+16.7
Independent	Mark Archer	428	19.9	−10.4
Labour	Valerie Brooker	197	9.2	+4.3
Majority		164	7.6	−0.8
Turnout		2,157	30.2	−6.6
Conservative hold		Swing	−8.0	

March East
Party	Candidate	Votes	%	±%
Conservative	Fred Yeulett *	673	35.1	−23.5
UKIP	Richard Mason	635	33.1	n/a
Labour	Martin Field	508	26.5	+8.7
Liberal Democrats	Diane Baldry	103	5.4	−18.3
Majority		38	2.1	−32.8
Turnout		1,926	29.4	−4.5
Conservative hold		Swing	−28.3	

March North
Party	Candidate	Votes	%	±%
Conservative	Steve Count *	616	38.0	−17.8
UKIP	Christina Towns	501	30.9	n/a
Liberal Democrats	Stephen Court	328	20.2	−10.3
Labour	David Brown	177	10.9	−2.8
Majority		115	7.1	−18.2
Turnout		1,624	29.4	−4.2
Conservative hold		Swing	−24.4	

March West
Party	Candidate	Votes	%	±%
Conservative	John Clark *	1,023	60.3	+6.6
Labour	Charlotte Goodhall-Perry	402	23.7	+15.6
Liberal Democrats	Heather Kinnear	271	16.0	+3.3
Majority		621	36.6	+8.5
Turnout		1,762	27.6	−8.4
Conservative hold		Swing	−4.5	

Roman Bank and Peckover
Party	Candidate	Votes	%	±%
UKIP	Alan Lay	955	41.2	+16.5
Conservative	Steve Tierney *	944	40.7	−12.3
Labour	Barry Diggle	335	14.4	+2.2
Liberal Democrats	Robert McLaren	85	3.7	−6.4
Majority		11	0.5	−27.9
Turnout		2,326	32.5	−4.4
UKIP gain from Conservative		Swing	+14.4	

Waldersey
Party	Candidate	Votes	%	±%
UKIP	Gordon Gillick	713	35.9	+35.9
Liberal Democrats	Gavin Booth	608	30.6	+2.9
Conservative	Will Sutton	528	26.6	−13.9
Labour	Jess Hibbert	139	7.0	+0.7
Majority		105	5.3	−7.5
Turnout		1,996	28.8	−9.3
UKIP gain from Conservative		Swing	+24.9	

Whittlesey North
Party	Candidate	Votes	%	±%
Conservative	Martin Curtis *	1,151	55.6	−6.7
UKIP	John Redding	611	29.5	n/a
Labour	Colin Gale	260	12.6	−2.8
English Democrat	Maria Goldspink	48	2.3	n/a
Majority		540	26.1	−13.9
Turnout		2,084	33.7	−4.0
Conservative hold		Swing	−18.1	

Whittlesey South
Party	Candidate	Votes	%	±%
Conservative	Ralph Butcher *	990	54.2	−13.3
English Democrat	Stephen Goldspink	536	29.3	n/a
Labour	Aidan Hervey	302	16.5	+6.7
Majority		454	24.8	−19.8
Turnout		1,851	27.8	−10.7
Conservative hold		Swing	−21.3	

Wisbech North
Party	Candidate	Votes	%	±%
UKIP	Paul Clapp	808	40.3	+9.6
Independent	Virginia Bucknor	529	26.4	n/a
Conservative	Samantha Hoy *	473	23.6	−18.1
Labour	Dean Reeves	193	9.6	−5.9
Majority		279	13.9	+3.0
Turnout		2,008	26.3	+2.3
UKIP gain from Conservative		Swing	+13.9	

Wisbech South
Party	Candidate	Votes	%	±%
UKIP	Peter Lagoda	774	38.2	+11.7
Conservative	Simon King *	636	31.4	−15.0
Labour	Malcom Gamble	333	16.5	+5.9
Liberal Democrats	Patrick Roy	281	13.9	+4.4
Majority		138	6.8	−13.0
Turnout		2,029	25.1	−6.0
UKIP gain from Conservative		Swing	+13.3	

=== Huntingdonshire ===
==== Summary ====
Huntingdonshire District Summary
Party	Seats	+/-	Votes	%	+/-
Conservative	8	▼8	19,702	35.6	−17.3
UKIP	6	▲5	17,683	31.9	+26.2
Liberal Democrats	3	▲1	7,073	12.8	−18.6
St. Neots Ind.	2	▲2	2,452	4.4	+4.4
Labour	0	Steady	6,198	11.2	+4.1
Independent	0	Steady	1,604	2.9	+2.9
Green	0	Steady	342	0.6	−1.5
Monster Raving Loony	0	Steady	197	0.4	−0.5
TUSC	0	Steady	148	0.3	+0.3
Total	19	Steady	55,399	100.0	

==== Division results ====
Brampton and Kimbolton
Party	Candidate	Votes	%	±%
Liberal Democrats	Peter Downes *	1,396	47.7	−11.9
Conservative	Jane King	769	26.3	−12.0
UKIP	Jenny O'Dell	646	22.1	n/a
Labour	Mark Johnson	118	4.0	+1.8
Majority		627	21.4	+0.1
Turnout		2,935	40.5	−11.0
Liberal Democrats hold		Swing	+0.1	

Buckden, Gransden and The Offords
Party	Candidate	Votes	%	±%
Conservative	Julie Wisson	1,039	43.6	−12.8
UKIP	Lynne Bullen	573	24.1	n/a
Liberal Democrats	Terry Clough	555	23.3	−16.3
Labour	Patrick Hickey	214	9.0	+5.0
Majority		466	19.6	+2.7
Turnout		2,386	30.1	−17.7
Conservative hold		Swing	−18.4	

Godmanchester and Huntingdon East (2 seats)
Party	Candidate	Votes	%	±%
Liberal Democrats	Michael Shellens	1,226	32.0	−14.7
Liberal Democrats	Graham Wilson *	1,195		
UKIP	Martin Cohen	1,171	30.6	n/a
UKIP	Derek Norman	1,080		
Conservative	Andrew Bish	1,026	26.8	−19.7
Conservative	Daryl Brown	1,024		
Labour	David King	331	4.4	+1.8
Labour	Robert Pugh	330		
TUSC	Antony Staples	76	2.0	n/a
TUSC	Robert Cossey-Mowle	72		
Majority		55	1.4	+1.2
Turnout		3,857	32.0	−11.1
Liberal Democrats hold		Swing	−22.6	
Liberal Democrats gain from Conservative		Swing	+2.5	

Huntingdon (2 seats)
Party	Candidate	Votes	%	±%
UKIP	Peter Ashcroft	1,118	34.7	n/a
Conservative	Peter Brown *	1,106	34.3	−14.9
UKIP	Kay Norman	985		
Conservative	Laine Kadic *	836		
Labour	Nik Johnson	721	22.4	+10.4
Labour	Marion Kadewere	611		
Liberal Democrats	Michael Burrell	277	8.6	−14.7
Liberal Democrats	Trish Shrapnel	238		
Majority		12	0.4	−25.6
Turnout		3,041	26.7	−6.6
UKIP gain from Conservative		Swing	+24.8	
Conservative hold		Swing		

Little Paxton and St Neots North (2 seats)
Party	Candidate	Votes	%	±%
Conservative	Barry Chapman	1,312	32.8	−19.6
Conservative	David Harty *	1,158		
UKIP	Marian Appleton	947	23.7	n/a
Independent	Bob Farrer *	858	21.4	n/a
Independent	Ken Churchill *	746		
UKIP	Sherrell Smart	596		
Labour	Emlyn Rees	360	9.0	+3.3
Liberal Democrats	Gordon Thorpe	311	7.8	−17.2
Labour	Jim Lomax	286		
Green	Melina Lafirenze	216	5.4	−11.6
Majority		365	9.1	−18.2
Turnout		3,559	28.2	−10.1
Conservative hold		Swing	−21.6	
Conservative hold		Swing		

Norman Cross (2 seats)
Party	Candidate	Votes	%	±%
UKIP	Roger Henson	1,270	39.7	+13.9
Conservative	Mac McGuire *	1,231	38.5	−10.7
Conservative	Nick Guyatt *	1,224		
UKIP	Barry Hyland	1,146		
Labour	Margaret Cochrane	481	15.0	+5.5
Labour	Graeme Watkins	405		
Liberal Democrats	Christopher Waites	218	6.8	−8.7
Majority		39	1.2	−22.1
Turnout		3,180	25.2	−8.6
UKIP gain from Conservative		Swing	+12.3	
Conservative hold		Swing		

Ramsey
Party	Candidate	Votes	%	±%
UKIP	Peter Reeve *	1,406	66.7	+21.3
Conservative	Madeleine Jackson	523	24.8	−11.0
Labour	Susan Coomey	110	5.2	+2.4
Liberal Democrats	Anthony Jebson	70	3.3	−12.8
Majority		883	41.9	+32.3
Turnout		2,114	32.7	+2.5
UKIP hold		Swing	+16.1	

Sawtry and Ellington
Party	Candidate	Votes	%	±%
UKIP	Simon Bywater	1,228	49.1	+29.2
Conservative	Viv McGuire *	894	35.8	−20.0
Labour	Mary Howell	230	9.2	+3.7
Liberal Democrats	Rupert Moss-Eccardt	149	6.0	−12.9
Majority		334	13.4	−22.4
Turnout		2,517	34.2	−8.6
UKIP gain from Conservative		Swing	+24.6	

Somersham and Earith
Party	Candidate	Votes	%	±%
Conservative	Steve Criswell *	1,321	52.2	−10.9
UKIP	Peter Verrechia	717	28.3	+13.1
Liberal Democrats	Tony Hulme	288	11.4	−5.9
Labour	Iain Ramsbottom	206	8.1	+3.7
Majority		604	23.9	−22.0
Turnout		2,535	34.3	−8.9
Conservative hold		Swing	−12.0	

St Ives (2 seats)
Party	Candidate	Votes	%	±%
UKIP	Paul Bullen	1,581	19.7	
Conservative	Kevin Reynolds *	1,521	18.9	
UKIP	Margaret King	1,459	18.2	
Conservative	Ryan Fuller	1,433	17.9	
Liberal Democrats	David Hodge	514	6.4	
Labour	Richard Allen	486	6.1	
Labour	Angela Richards	448	5.6	
Liberal Democrats	Colin Saunderson	389	4.8	
Monster Raving Loony	Lord Toby Jug	197	2.5	
Majority		60	1.4	−18.7
Turnout		4,149	28.4	−6.6
UKIP gain from Conservative		Swing	+26.1	
Conservative hold		Swing		

St Neots Eaton Socon and Eynesbury (2 seats)
Party	Candidate	Votes	%	±%
St. Neots Ind.	Derek Giles	1,311	40.1	n/a
St. Neots Ind.	Steven Van de Kerkhove	1,141		
Conservative	Roger Harrison	728	22.3	−27.5
Conservative	Adrian Usher	710		
UKIP	Dave Howard	692	21.2	n/a
UKIP	Steve Lancaster	470		
Labour	Wendy Hurst	250	7.7	−0.4
Labour	William O'Connor	209		
Liberal Democrats	Martin Land	162	5.0	−37.3
Green	Gareth Thomas	126	3.9	n/a
Majority		583	17.8	+10.3
Turnout		3,026	25.9	−5.2
St. Neots Ind. gain from Conservative		Swing	+33.8	
St. Neots Ind. gain from Conservative				

The Hemingfords and Fenstanton
Party	Candidate	Votes	%	±%
Conservative	Ian Bates *	1,141	47.6	−18.5
UKIP	Philip Foster	794	33.1	n/a
Liberal Democrats	David Priestman	232	9.7	−17.7
Labour	John Watson	231	9.6	+3.0
Majority		347	14.5	−24.2
Turnout		2,402	32.3	−9.8
Conservative hold		Swing	−25.8	

Warboys and Upwood
Party	Candidate	Votes	%	±%
UKIP	Michael Tew	1,002	47.0	+18.4
Conservative	Jason Ablewhite	796	37.3	−12.7
Labour	Kevin Goddard	171	8.0	+4.5
Liberal Democrats	Christine Wills	164	7.7	−10.2
Majority		206	9.7	−11.8
Turnout		2,142	29.6	−9.4
UKIP gain from Conservative		Swing	+15.6	

=== South Cambridgeshire ===
==== Summary ====
South Cambridgeshire District Summary
Party	Seats	+/-	Votes	%	+/-
Conservative	10	▲2	16,460	35.6	−10.3
Liberal Democrats	5	▼3	12,755	27.6	−10.1
Independent	1	▲1	1,317	2.9	+0.7
Labour	0	Steady	7,116	15.4	+8.0
UKIP	0	Steady	6,244	13.5	+12.9
Green	0	Steady	2,348	5.1	−1.3
Monster Raving Loony	0	Steady	28	0.1	+0.1
Total	16	Steady	46,268	100.0	

==== Division results ====
Bar Hill
Party	Candidate	Votes	%	±%
Conservative	John Reynolds *	1,175	45.4	−10.3
UKIP	Helene Davies-Green	570	22.0	+11.9
Labour	Norman Crowther	352	13.6	+5.1
Green	Teal Riley	242	9.4	−0.2
Liberal Democrats	Andy Pellew	219	8.5	−7.7
Monster Raving Loony	Lord Broughall	28	1.1	n/a
Majority		605	23.4	−16.2
Turnout		2,593	35.1	−11.2
Conservative hold		Swing	−11.1	

Bassingbourn
Party	Candidate	Votes	%	±%
Conservative	Adrian Dent	726	45.8	−12.2
Green	Simon Saggers	544	34.3	+12.1
Labour	Mark Toner	199	12.6	+3.9
Liberal Democrats	Mark Holmes	117	7.4	−3.8
Majority		182	11.5	−24.3
Turnout		1,613	29.5	−15.1
Conservative hold		Swing	−12.1	

Bourn
Party	Candidate	Votes	%	±%
Conservative	Mervyn Loynes	449	26.0	−23.3
Liberal Democrats	Roger Hume	434	25.1	−11.8
Labour	Gavin Clayton	393	22.7	+9.0
UKIP	Lister Wilson *	363	21.0	n/a
Green	Marcus Pitcaithly	89	5.2	n/a
Majority		15	0.9	−11.5
Turnout		1,732	25.9	−9.7
Conservative hold		Swing	−5.8	

Cottenham, Histon and Impington (2 seats)
Party	Candidate	Votes	%	±%
Independent	Mike Mason	1,317	24.9	n/a
Liberal Democrats	John Jenkins *	1,260	23.8	−19.0
Conservative	Lynda Harford	1,147	21.7	−16.7
Liberal Democrats	Sue Gymer *	1,127		
Conservative	Timothy Wotherspoon	1,082		
Labour	Huw Jones	931	17.6	+11.2
Labour	Brenda Biamonti	817		
UKIP	Eric Heaver	637	12.0	n/a
UKIP	Joe Webster	567		
Majority		57	1.1	−3.4
Turnout		4,753	34.5	−8.3
Independent gain from Liberal Democrats		Swing	+22.0	
Liberal Democrats hold		Swing	−1.2	

Duxford
Party	Candidate	Votes	%	±%
Conservative	Peter Topping	1,125	42.7	+7.2
Liberal Democrats	Warren Wilson	765	29.0	−22.6
UKIP	Elizabeth Wade	488	18.5	n/a
Labour	Ann Sinnott	256	9.7	+5.2
Majority		360	13.7	−2.4
Turnout		2,644	38.0	−12.0
Conservative gain from Liberal Democrats		Swing	+14.9	

Fulbourn
Party	Candidate	Votes	%	±%
Liberal Democrats	John Williams	1,180	44.9	+18.6
Conservative	Nick Clarke *	848	32.2	−3.4
Labour	June Ford	434	16.5	+8.6
Green	David Smith	169	6.4	n/a
Majority		332	12.6	+3.3
Turnout		2,654	34.6	−6.3
Liberal Democrats gain from Conservative		Swing	+11.0	

Gamlingay
Party	Candidate	Votes	%	±%
Liberal Democrats	Sebastian Kindersley *	1,456	49.8	−7.8
Conservative	Alison Elcox	730	25.0	−12.3
UKIP	Diane Birnie	478	16.3	n/a
Labour	Peter Smith	262	9.0	+3.7
Majority		726	24.8	+4.5
Turnout		2,944	37.6	−9.8
Liberal Democrats hold		Swing	+2.3	

Hardwick
Party	Candidate	Votes	%	±%
Conservative	Stephen Frost	1,006	41.7	+10.1
Liberal Democrats	Peter Fane	905	37.5	−17.0
Labour	Adam Dutton	503	20.8	+16.3
Majority		101	4.2	−18.7
Turnout		2,468	32.0	−14.4
Conservative gain from Liberal Democrats		Swing	+13.5	

Linton
Party	Candidate	Votes	%	±%
Conservative	Roger Hickford	1,253	40.2	−6.2
Liberal Democrats	John Batchelor *	1,252	40.1	−8.3
UKIP	Timothy Skottowe	346	11.1	n/a
Labour	Tom Purser	269	8.6	+3.4
Majority		1	0.0	−2.0
Turnout		3,129	42.6	−10.4
Conservative gain from Liberal Democrats		Swing	+1.0	

Melbourn
Party	Candidate	Votes	%	±%
Liberal Democrats	Susan Van de Ven *	1,875	62.6	+12.7
UKIP	David Kendrick	475	15.9	n/a
Conservative	Duncan Bullivant	440	14.7	−24.4
Labour	Angela Patrick	207	6.9	+2.4
Majority		1,400	46.7	+36.0
Turnout		3,006	40.8	−8.1
Liberal Democrats hold		Swing	−1.6	

Papworth and Swavesey
Party	Candidate	Votes	%	±%
Conservative	Mandy Smith *	938	49.6	−14.5
UKIP	David Birnie	391	20.7	n/a
Labour	David Barrett	234	12.4	+3.9
Green	Gaynor Clements	197	10.4	n/a
Liberal Democrats	Richard Gymer	131	6.9	−20.5
Majority		547	28.9	−7.8
Turnout		1,899	31.0	−12.6
Conservative hold		Swing	−17.6	

Sawston (2 seats)
Party	Candidate	Votes	%	±%
Conservative	Tony Orgee *	1,852	35.9	−3.9
Conservative	Gail Kenney *	1,754		
UKIP	Andrew Billinge	954	18.5	n/a
Labour	Adrian French	880	17.0	+6.7
Green	Linda Whitebread	810	15.7	−6.8
Labour	Mike Nettleton	801		
Liberal Democrats	Michael Kilpatrick	669	13.0	−14.5
Majority		898	17.4	+5.1
Turnout		4,241	32.2	−9.6
Conservative hold		Swing	−11.2	
Conservative hold		Swing		

Waterbeach
Party	Candidate	Votes	%	±%
Liberal Democrats	Maurice Leeke	1,217	42.5	−9.8
Conservative	James Hockney	1,053	36.8	−6.0
UKIP	Richard Glover	279	9.8	n/a
Labour	Paul Finley	191	6.8	+1.8
Green	Eleanor Crane	122	4.3	n/a
Majority		164	5.7	−3.7
Turnout		2,872	40.9	−3.8
Liberal Democrats hold		Swing	−1.9	

Willingham
Party	Candidate	Votes	%	±%
Conservative	Ray Manning	882	39.6	−18.5
UKIP	Martin Hale	636	28.6	n/a
Labour	Ben Monks	387	17.4	+10.1
Green	Helen Stocks	175	7.9	n/a
Liberal Democrats	Barry Platt	148	6.6	−28.1
Majority		246	11.0	−12.3
Turnout		2,231	29.9	−7.2
Conservative hold		Swing	−23.5	
