= Cambridgeshire Autonomous Metro =

Proposed transportation system in Cambridge

Official logo

The Cambridgeshire Autonomous Metro (CAM) was a rapid transit proposal in Cambridge, United Kingdom. It suggested that the project would be delivered between 2023 and 2029. Proposed by Cambridgeshire and Peterborough Combined Authority mayor James Palmer in 2017, it was scrapped when he lost the 2021 election to Nik Johnson, who cancelled the project.

== Background ==
Cambridge had a tram system, Cambridge Street Tramways, between 1880 and 1914, after which it was replaced by buses.

The mayor of the newly created Combined Authority made the introduction of a light rail scheme, partly running underground, a priority on his election in 2017; however, the proposed system was intended to use rubber-tyred vehicles, not light rail.

The strategic business case for the project was approved in March 2019. It claimed that the project, priced at £4 billion, could lead to the creation of 100,000 jobs and 60,000 new homes. One CAM Ltd was established in September 2020. The company is entirely owned by the Combined Authority and is responsible for developing and delivering the project. Its board is chaired by Robert Mair.

In October 2020, it was announced that three shortlisted companies would each be given £200,000 to develop "creative and feasible" concepts for the system. These were revealed in March 2021, created by Mott MacDonald, Egis Group, and Dromos Technologies. Each concept is said to cost £2 billion to implement.

In March 2021, the Labour candidate in the Combined Authority said it had spent £2.5 million on the project so far. The Labour mayoral candidate Nik Johnson stated that he would scrap the project if he was elected. Upon his successful election to the post he re-confirmed that the project was scrapped.

== Proposal ==
The project was envisioned to connect Cambridge North railway station with the city centre, the northern entrance of the science park near Arbury, and the disused railway stations at Haverhill and Linton. The proposed scheme would have run for 88 miles and include 7 miles of tunnels beneath the city. Branches would run from the core to Alconbury, St Neots (potentially interchanging with East West Rail), Trumpington, Haverhill, Mildenhall and Waterbeach.

In May 2020, a report was published which proposed halving costs from £4 billion to £2 billion by using smaller vehicles, allowing for narrower tunnels.

In March 2021 three proposals were received for consideration.

- an 84 stop Autonomous Transit Network using small vehicles that provide non-stop service with 24-hour availability
- a phased introduction starting with two route initial routes using 18.7 m (20.5 yd) vehicles, carrying up to 110 passengers, running autonomously but with a safety driver. The further development of a five route network would have full driverless operation with the potential for on-demand service using 20 passenger vehicles.
- a fully automated system using bi-directional, battery powered, two-car vehicles.

In May 2021 the newly elected mayor said he was focused instead on a "revamped bus network" but would not yet abandon the work done.

== Cambridge Light Rail ==
In 2024, Cambridge Connect proposed repurposing the proposed metro route as a light railway, known as the Isaac Newton Line. This would connect Haverhill and Linton with the guided busway station at Trumpington, the science park near Cambridge North, Addenbrookes Hospital, and a new station in Cambridge city centre. Cambridge Connect are currently in discussion with the Labour party for a £5 million grant for a feasibility study. If approved, the line is expected to be completed by 2030 on a budget of £700 million.
