= Tom Hunt (politician) =

British politician (born 1988)

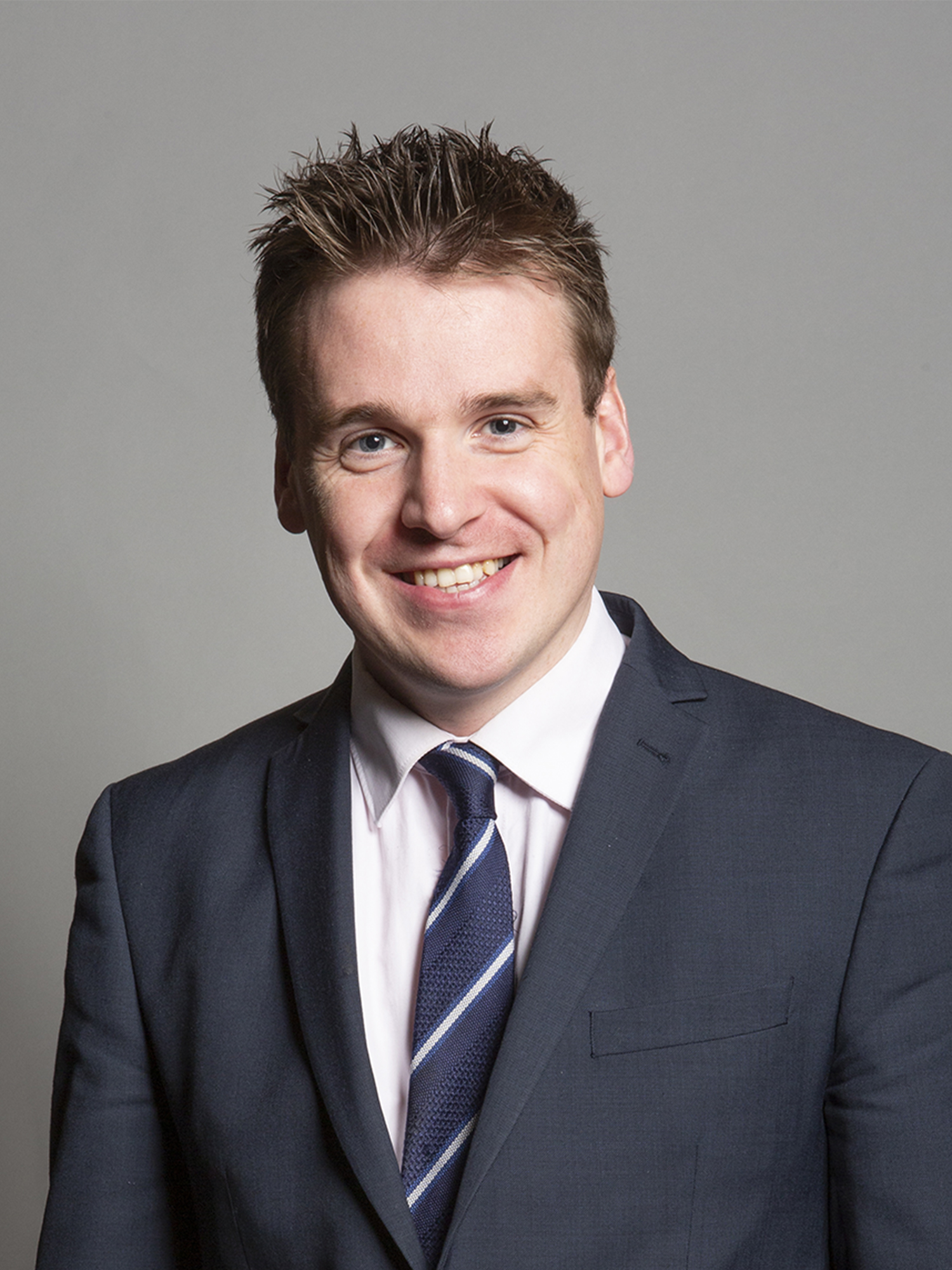
- Official portrait, 2019

Member of Parliament for Ipswich
- In office 12 December 2019 – 30 May 2024
- Preceded by: Sandy Martin
- Succeeded by: Jack Abbott

Personal details
- Born: Thomas Patrick Hunt; 31 August 1988 (age 38) Ely, Cambridgeshire, England
- Party: Reform UK (from 2025)
- Other political affiliations: Conservative (until 2025)
- Education: University of Manchester; Pembroke College, Oxford
- Occupation: Politician

Thomas Patrick Hunt (born 31 August 1988) is an English politician who served as Member of Parliament (MP) for Ipswich from 2019 to 2024. During his time in Parliament, he was a member of the Conservative Party, serving on the Education Select Committee and as the Prime Minister's Trade Envoy to Bangladesh. After leaving Parliament, he was provisionally expelled from the Conservative Party in 2025. In the weeks beforehand, The Times reported that he was among a number of former MPs being targeted by Reform UK as potential recruits.

Earlier in his career, he was a councillor on East Cambridgeshire District Council from 2011 to 2017. Following the Cambridgeshire and Peterborough devolution deal, Hunt also worked as chief of staff to the elected Mayor of Cambridgeshire and Peterborough.

== Early life and education ==
Thomas Hunt was born on 31 August 1988 in Ely, Cambridgeshire. He was privately educated at King's Ely and then at the state Hills Road Sixth Form College in Cambridge. Hunt went on to study Politics and Modern History at the University of Manchester and an MSc at Pembroke College, Oxford. After Manchester and before Oxford, Hunt worked for four months in an agricultural processing plant in the Fens, sorting vegetables.

== Political career ==
In 2011, Hunt was elected as a district councillor for Ely South on East Cambridgeshire District Council, serving until 2017. He was head of media for the Countryside Alliance.

After working as a parliamentary assistant for Oliver Dowden, Hunt worked as chief of staff to the Mayor of Cambridgeshire and Peterborough, James Palmer. In July 2020, a government minister, Simon Clarke, criticised the appointment, saying that the legal advice behind it "contained significant omissions".

At the snap 2017 general election, Hunt stood as the Conservative candidate in Doncaster Central, coming second with 34.4% of the vote behind the incumbent Labour Rosie Winterton.

Hunt was selected as the Conservative prospective parliamentary candidate for Ipswich by the local Conservative Association in September 2018.

During the run up to the 2019 general election, Hunt said he would prioritise more investment in public services in Suffolk. This was to include more funding for Suffolk Constabulary to tackle county lines gangs and knife crime. Prior to the election, Hunt also stated that he wanted infrastructure upgrades. He has expressed his support for an Ipswich northern bypass, a solution to closures of Orwell Bridge due to high winds, in addition to better and more reliable rail services.

== Parliamentary career ==
At the 2019 general election, Hunt was elected to Parliament as MP for Ipswich with 50.3% of the vote and a majority of 5,479. He said being elected to represent Ipswich was the greatest honour of his life. After his election, Hunt said his priorities for Ipswich included combatting anti-social behaviour, ensuring good hospital and GP services in the constituency, and seeking greater investment in roads and the rail network in Suffolk.

In his maiden speech, Hunt said that he had been diagnosed with dyslexia and dyspraxia. He favours support for children with special educational needs.

One of Hunt's first actions after becoming an MP was to join the European Research Group, a eurosceptic group of MPs.

In January 2020, Hunt wrote in an article for the local East Anglian Daily Times newspaper on crime and anti-social behaviour in Ipswich, stating: "It is impossible to start thinking about remedies to these issues without also being ready to confront the possibility that a disproportionate number of crimes are committed by individuals from certain communities. This is something we should be open and honest about. Brushing it under the carpet will not get us closer to solving the issue". The Ipswich and Suffolk Council for Racial Equality called his comments "at best disappointing and at worst an ill-judged piece of dogwhistling." The Suffolk Police and Crime Commissioner, Tim Passmore, referred to Hunt's comments as "very unhelpful".

During November 2020 he joined the COVID Recovery Group and abstained in the vote for a second lockdown.

Following an interim report on the connections between colonialism and properties now in the care of the National Trust, including links with historic slavery, Hunt was among the signatories of a letter to The Daily Telegraph in November 2020 from the Common Sense Group of Conservative MPs. The letter accused the National Trust of being "coloured by cultural Marxist dogma, colloquially known as the 'woke agenda'". He has also said that Historic England are "waging a war against our heritage", and considers their approach to explaining slavery at their sites as "Maoist and dystopian".

On 16 March 2021, Hunt denied claims made by Labour councillors that he had refused to meet with front-line workers with Hunt saying that this was due to earlier disputes with TUC members.

In April 2021, Hunt called for the flying of the Union Jack to be made compulsory in all schools, stating on Twitter that "If any pupils and teachers have concerns about this then surely they can be "educated" about what the flag actually represents".

In January 2022, Hunt reacted to the clearing of the four people charged with the toppling of the Statue of Edward Colston by telling The Daily Telegraph: "If you've broken the law and committed criminal damage you should be punished. If the jury is a barrier to ensuring they are punished then that needs to be addressed".

In April 2022, during a discussion on the BBC's Politics Live programme about the government's plans to deport asylum seekers to Rwanda, Hunt claimed that Rwanda was a "safe European country."

In April 2022, after Prime Minister Boris Johnson and Chancellor of the Exchequer Rishi Sunak were fined for breaking Covid rules during the 'Partygate' scandal, Hunt said that he believed they did not break the law and the decision to fine them was 'a bit harsh'.

In March 2023, a demonstration was organised at a local hotel in Ipswich to protest against the housing of asylum seekers, which was met on the day by a larger counter protest. Hunt declared on his personal blog and social media there was "no far right presence" at the demonstration. However, investigations by East Anglia Bylines revealed far-right involvement in the demonstrations.

In the 2024 Ipswich Borough Council election, Hunt misplaced his passport and was forced to ask local Conservative members to find someone to act as an emergency proxy. He later explained that the loss was due to his dyspraxia.

Hunt was re-selected as the Conservative candidate for Ipswich at the 2024 general election but was defeated by the Labour candidate, Jack Abbott.

On 21 July 2025, Hunt was expelled from the Conservative Party following a complaints process.

Parliament of the United Kingdom
Preceded by Sandy Martin	Member of Parliament for Ipswich; 2019–2024	Succeeded by Jack Abbott
