= Paul Bristow =

British politician (born 1979)

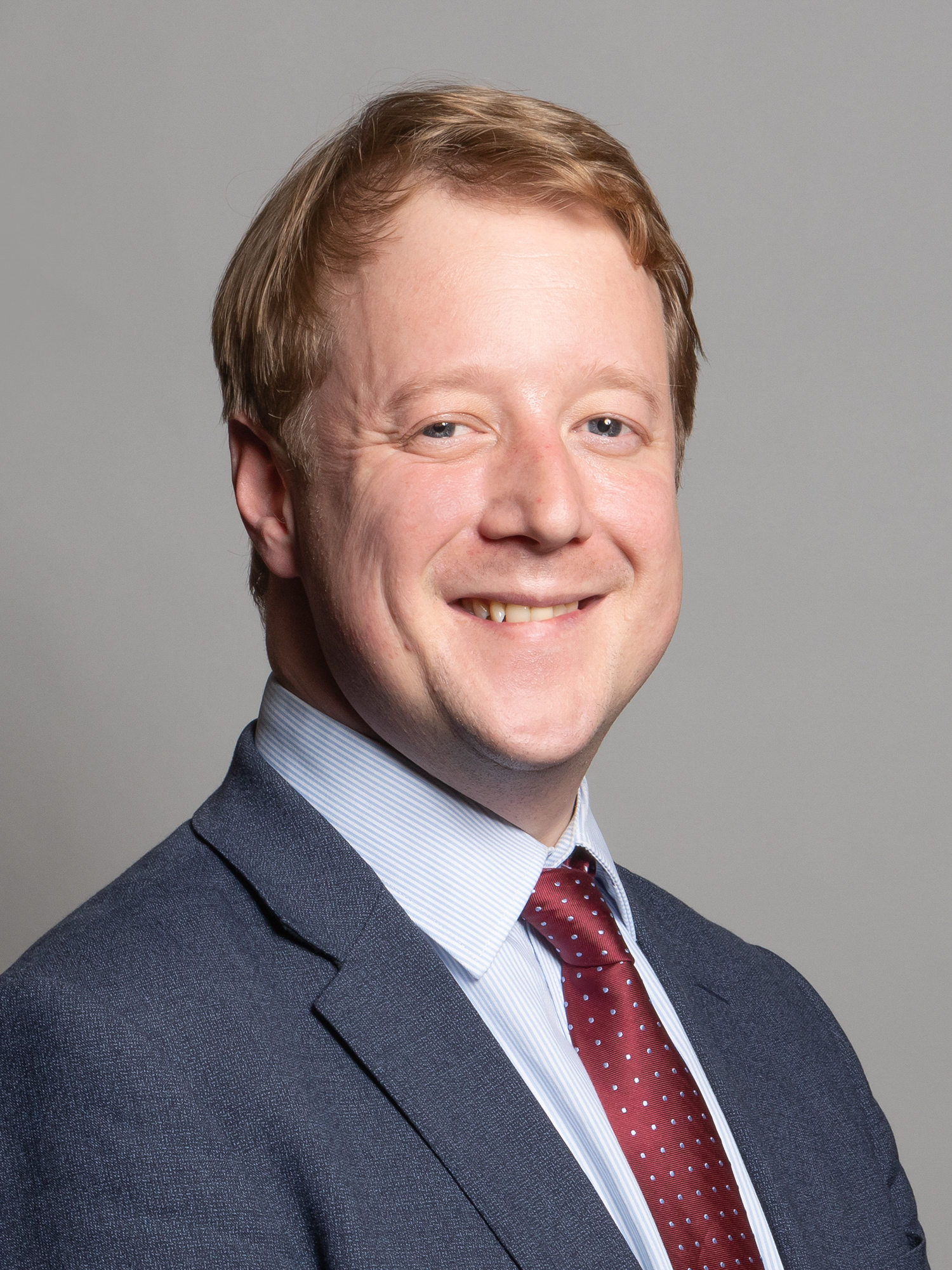
- Official portrait, 2020

Mayor of Cambridgeshire and Peterborough
- Incumbent
- Assumed office 5 May 2025
- Preceded by: Nik Johnson

Member of Parliament for Peterborough
- In office 12 December 2019 – 30 May 2024
- Preceded by: Lisa Forbes
- Succeeded by: Andrew Pakes

Member of Hammersmith and Fulham London Borough Council for Fulham Reach
- In office 4 May 2006 – 7 May 2010

Personal details
- Born: 27 March 1979 (age 47) York, England
- Party: Conservative
- Spouse: Sara Petela (m. 2019)
- Children: 2
- Education: Cartmel College, Lancaster (BA)
- Website: www.paulbristow.org.uk

Paul Bristow (born 27 March 1979) is a British politician who has served as the strategic authority mayor for Cambridgeshire and Peterborough since 2025 and formerly served as the Member of Parliament (MP) for Peterborough from 2019 until 2024, when he was defeated by the Labour candidate Andrew Pakes. A member of the Conservative Party, he worked as a public relations consultant and was the chairman of the lobbying trade body, the Association of Professional Political Consultants, prior to his parliamentary career. Bristow was also a councillor on Hammersmith and Fulham London Borough Council between 2006 and 2010.

== Early life ==
Bristow was born on 27 March 1979 in York. His parents were both nurses. His father Alan was also a Conservative Party district councillor. Bristow grew up in Whittlesey in Cambridgeshire, where he had moved when he was five years old and attended Sir Harry Smith Community College. Bristow credits his history teacher for fostering his interest in politics, and reports joining the Conservative Party at the age of 16. He studied History and Politics at Lancaster University (Cartmel College) and previously worked as a parliamentary aide for former Conservative MP Richard Spring.

== Political career ==
In 2006, Bristow was elected to Hammersmith and Fulham Council as a councillor for Fulham Reach ward. He stood down from the council to contest the Labour-held seat of Middlesbrough South and East Cleveland at the 2010 general election, finishing in second place with 35.6% of the vote.

In 2013 he tried, unsuccessfully, to be the Conservative candidate for the constituency of South East Cambridgeshire making the final short-list but losing out to Lucy Frazer.

After returning to Peterborough, Bristow contested the 2019 Peterborough by-election, finishing in third place behind Labour's Lisa Forbes and Brexit Party candidate Mike Greene. At the 2019 general election, he won the seat with a majority of 2,580 votes. Before his parliamentary career, Bristow had been the chairman of the lobbying trade body, the Association of Professional Political Consultants, between 2017 and 2019. He was also the director of the healthcare public relations consultancy PB Consulting which he had founded in 2010. Bristow resigned his directorship and handed over control of the firm to his wife in January 2020. It was also renamed as HealthComms Consulting in the same year. As MP, he continued to submit questions to ministers on health issues related to the firm but did not always declare his interests.

Bristow has served as a member of the Health and Social Care Committee since November 2022 and had previously been part of the committee between March 2020 and May 2022. He was appointed as a Parliamentary Private Secretary (PPS) to the Secretary of State for Digital, Culture, Media and Sport Nadine Dorries in February 2022. In April 2020, Bristow discussed in an interview with the BBC that he had broken restrictions during the first COVID-19 lockdown by visiting his father before he died of a brain tumour. He commented that "anybody would've done the same".

In April 2021, The Observer reported that Bristow claimed rental expenses of £10,500 between April and November 2020 for his constituency accommodation while renting out three residential properties in London. Responding to the article, he stated that he had "followed both the letter and the spirit of the rules".

In November 2021, Bristow wrote an article in The Times calling for MPs to be banned from involvement in consultant lobbying. He initially supported Grant Shapps in the July 2022 Conservative Party leadership election, after Shapps withdrew, Bristow endorsed Liz Truss.

In October 2022, following the resignation of Truss as Prime Minister, Bristow announced that he would be supporting previous Prime Minister Boris Johnson in the subsequent leadership election.

On 24 May 2023, Bristow was asked by the Speaker to leave the House of Commons, owing to his disruptive behaviour. Commons Speaker Sir Lindsay Hoyle interrupted Leader of the Opposition Sir Keir Starmer during Prime Minister's Questions to ask Bristow to leave. Bristow was not formally ejected, though Hoyle had threatened to name him, should he not leave voluntarily.

In October 2023, Bristow wrote a letter urging Prime Minister Rishi Sunak to support a "permanent ceasefire" in the Gaza war for humanitarian reasons. In further comments on his Facebook page, he said Palestinians "should not suffer collective punishment for the crimes of Hamas." Bristow co-chairs the all-party parliamentary group on British Muslims. He was dismissed as Parliamentary Private Secretary at the Department for Science, Innovation and Technology for his comments as they diverged from the government's position and "not consistent with the principles of collective responsibility". Bristow was the first Conservative MP to diverge.

In November 2024, Bristow was selected as the Conservative Party candidate for the 2025 Cambridgeshire and Peterborough mayoral election. In May 2025, Bristow was elected as the Mayor for the Cambridgeshire and Peterborough Combined Authority, succeeding Labour and Co-Operative Mayor Nik Johnson.

== Personal life ==
Bristow is a supporter of York City F.C. He is married and has two daughters. His wife Sara (née Petela) is a public relations consultant and the managing director of PLMR Healthcomms Consulting. Healthcomms Consulting specialises in healthcare and health technology and was founded by Bristow in 2010 under its previous name, PB Consulting. He resigned his directorship in January 2020, handing control to his wife. PLMR acquired the firm in 2022. His sister-in-law Emma is a Senior Partner of the public relations consultancy GK Strategy.

In August 2021, Bristow was given a 28-day driving ban after speeding at 76 mph on the 50 mph A1 at Buckden, Cambridgeshire. He requested the ban to avoid "any suggestion of hypocrisy" when campaigning about "speeding on residential streets" in Peterborough.

Parliament of the United Kingdom
Preceded by Lisa Forbes	Member of Parliament for Peterborough; 2019–2024	Succeeded by Andrew Pakes
Political offices
Preceded by Nik Johnson	Mayor of Cambridgeshire and Peterborough; 2025–present	Incumbent
