= 2014 Huntingdonshire District Council election =

2014 UK local government election

Map of the results of the 2014 Huntingdonshire District Council election. Conservatives in blue, UK Independence Party in purple, independents in light grey and Liberal Democrats in yellow. Wards in dark grey were not contested in 2014.

The 2014 Huntingdonshire District Council election took place on 22 May 2014 to elect members of Huntingdonshire District Council in Cambridgeshire, England. One third of the council was up for election and the Conservative Party stayed in overall control of the council.

After the election, the composition of the council was:

- Conservative 34
- UK Independence Party 7
- Liberal Democrats 5
- Independent 4
- Labour 1
- Vacant 1

== Background ==
At the last election in 2012 the Conservatives stayed in control of the council with 39 seats, compared to 7 Liberal Democrats, 3 UK Independence Party, 2 independents and 1 for Labour. However, in early 2013 Conservative councillors, Ken Churchill from Little Paxton ward and Bob Farrer from St Neots Eaton Ford, left the Conservatives to become independents and then joined the UK Independence Party in November 2013. Subsequently in January 2014 another Conservative councillor, Colin Hyams of Godmanchester ward, defected to the Liberal Democrats.

The changes meant that before the election the Conservatives had 35 councillors, Liberal Democrats 7, UK Independence Party 5, independents 3, Labour had 1 seat and 1 seat was vacant after the death of the Conservative councillor for Warboys and Bury, John Pethard. 17 of the 52 seats on the council were contested with 5 councillors, Terry Clough, Nick Guyatt, Colin Hyams, Terry Rogers and Alan Williams, standing down at the election.

== Election result ==
The Conservatives stayed in control of the council after winning 11 of the 17 seats contested, but lost 1 seat to the UK Independence Party in Yaxley and Farcet. The UK Independence Party also gained a seat from the Liberal Democrats in Huntingdon East by 34 votes to end the election with 7 councillors. The only other change came in Buckden where independent Terry Hayward won a seat, which had formerly been held by Liberal Democrat William Clough before he stood down at the election. These defeats reduced the Liberal Democrats to 5 seats on the council, but Sarah Conboy did hold Godmanchester for the party after Colin Hyams, who had defected to the Liberal Democrats from the Conservatives earlier in 2014, stood down.

Huntingdonshire local election result 2014
Party	Seats	Gains	Losses	Net gain/loss	Seats %	Votes %	Votes	+/−
Conservative	11	0	1	-1	64.7	38.9	12,396	+2.6%
UKIP	3	2	0	+2	17.6	31.4	10,003	+10.8%
Independent	2	1	0	+1	11.8	5.4	1,734	-8.4%
Liberal Democrats	1	0	2	-2	5.9	10.7	3,398	-5.9%
Labour	0	0	0	0	0	12.5	3,986	-0.7%
Green	0	0	0	0	0	1.0	333	+1.0%

== Ward results ==
Alconbury and the Stukeleys
Party	Candidate	Votes	%	±%
Conservative	Keith Baker	447	38.2	−20.2
UKIP	Martin Cohen	332	28.4	+28.4
Liberal Democrats	Mary Watkin	311	26.6	−6.1
Labour	Nick Sherratt	81	6.9	−2.0
Majority		115	9.8	−15.9
Turnout		1,171	46	−29
Conservative hold		Swing		

Buckden
Party	Candidate	Votes	%	±%
Independent	Terry Hayward	674	58.6	+58.6
Conservative	Julie Wisson	253	22.0	−10.1
UKIP	John Lloyd	169	14.7	+14.7
Labour	Robert Pugh	54	4.7	+0.3
Majority		421	36.6	
Turnout		1,150	44	−33
Independent gain from Liberal Democrats		Swing		

Earith
Party	Candidate	Votes	%	±%
Conservative	Mike Francis	1,062	53.5	−8.2
UKIP	Peter Verrechia	524	26.4	+16.9
Labour	Margaret Cochrane	216	10.9	−3.8
Liberal Democrats	Tony Hulme	184	9.3	−4.8
Majority		538	27.1	−19.9
Turnout		1,986	42	−6
Conservative hold		Swing		

Elton and Folksworth
Party	Candidate	Votes	%	±%
Conservative	Rita Mathews	531	57.0	−4.0
UKIP	Roger Henson	273	29.3	+20.3
Labour	Kevin Goddard	127	13.6	+3.4
Majority		258	27.7	−13.6
Turnout		931	44	−32
Conservative hold		Swing		

Godmanchester
Party	Candidate	Votes	%	±%
Liberal Democrats	Sarah Conboy	901	46.0	+18.5
Conservative	Peter Brown	470	24.0	−4.3
UKIP	Paul Dickinson	404	20.6	+12.7
Labour	Ruth Pugh	183	9.3	−0.1
Majority		431	22.0	
Turnout		1,958	39	+5
Liberal Democrats hold		Swing		

Gransden and the Offords
Party	Candidate	Votes	%	±%
Conservative	Richard West	846	53.5	−23.1
Labour	Doctor Johnson	381	24.1	+12.5
UKIP	Keith Drew	353	22.3	+22.3
Majority		465	29.4	−35.4
Turnout		1,580	43	−10
Conservative hold		Swing		

Huntingdon East
Party	Candidate	Votes	%	±%
UKIP	Andrew Hardy	882	32.5	+17.4
Liberal Democrats	Ste Greenall	848	31.2	−5.7
Conservative	Daryl Brown	702	25.9	−9.5
Labour	David King	282	10.4	−2.2
Majority		34	1.3	
Turnout		2,714	38	+6
UKIP gain from Liberal Democrats		Swing		

Huntingdon West
Party	Candidate	Votes	%	±%
Conservative	Stephen Cawley	654	40.6	−22.0
UKIP	Dennis Brown	425	26.4	+19.3
Liberal Democrats	Michael Burrell	317	19.7	+4.6
Labour	Mark Johnson	215	13.3	−1.9
Majority		229	14.2	−33.2
Turnout		1,611	31	−9
Conservative hold		Swing		

Ramsey
Party	Candidate	Votes	%	±%
UKIP	Peter Reeve	1,553	63.6	+2.7
Conservative	Madeleine Jackson	650	26.6	−3.6
Labour	Iain Ramsbottom	151	6.2	−2.7
Liberal Democrats	Anthony Jebson	89	3.6	+3.6
Majority		903	37.0	+6.4
Turnout		2,443	37	+8
UKIP hold		Swing		

Sawtry
Party	Candidate	Votes	%	±%
Conservative	Darren Tysoe	877	45.5	+45.5
UKIP	Simon Bywater	813	42.1	+25.5
Labour	Margaret Coomey	239	12.4	+4.6
Majority		64	3.4	
Turnout		1,929	39	+10
Conservative hold		Swing		

St Ives East
Party	Candidate	Votes	%	±%
Conservative	Deborah Reynolds	621	39.2	−7.3
UKIP	Paul Bullen	582	36.7	+12.8
Labour	Jim Lomax	226	14.3	+2.4
Liberal Democrats	John Oliver	156	9.8	+0.5
Majority		39	2.5	−20.2
Turnout		1,585	31	+3
Conservative hold		Swing		

St. Ives South
Party	Candidate	Votes	%	±%
Conservative	Angie Dickinson	866	42.5	−4.5
UKIP	Margaret King	585	28.7	+24.2
Labour	John Watson	340	16.7	+9.0
Liberal Democrats	Colin Saunderson	246	12.1	+7.1
Majority		281	13.8	+2.6
Turnout		2,037	38	−7
Conservative hold		Swing		

St Neots Eynesbury
Party	Candidate	Votes	%	±%
Independent	Steve Van De Kerkhove	1,060	46.7	+46.7
UKIP	Marian Appleton	457	20.1	−0.7
Conservative	Louie Ruck	422	18.6	−23.5
Labour	Angela Hogan	211	9.3	−13.7
Green	Gareth Thomas	118	5.2	+5.2
Majority		603	26.6	
Turnout		2,268	30	+9
Independent hold		Swing		

St Neots Priory Park
Party	Candidate	Votes	%	±%
Conservative	Barry Chapman	1,048	48.4	−7.4
UKIP	Carol Gamby	580	26.8	+26.8
Labour	Stephen Hinchley	321	14.8	−2.4
Green	Melina Lafirenze	215	9.9	+9.9
Majority		468	21.6	−7.2
Turnout		2,164	32	−9
Conservative hold		Swing		

The Hemingfords
Party	Candidate	Votes	%	±%
Conservative	Doug Dew	1,303	58.5	+18.0
UKIP	Philip Foster	550	24.7	+13.0
Labour	Richard Allen	376	16.9	+9.8
Majority		753	33.8	+26.9
Turnout		2,229	44	+4
Conservative hold		Swing		

Warboys and Bury
Party	Candidate	Votes	%	±%
Conservative	Peter Bucknell	864	49.4	+3.1
UKIP	Andy Monk	576	32.9	+6.7
Labour	Mary Howell	172	9.8	−5.0
Liberal Democrats	Christine Wills	138	7.9	−4.9
Majority		288	16.5	−3.6
Turnout		1,750	36	+8
Conservative hold		Swing		

Yaxley and Farcet
Party	Candidate	Votes	%	±%
UKIP	Barry Hyland	945	40.3	+15.7
Conservative	Maddie Banerjee	780	33.3	−13.5
Labour	Graeme Watkins	411	17.5	−5.8
Liberal Democrats	Chris Waites	208	8.9	+3.6
Majority		165	7.0	
Turnout		2,344	28	+5
UKIP gain from Conservative		Swing		

== By-elections between 2014 and 2015 ==
=== Warboys and Bury ===
A by-election took place in Warboys and Bury on 7 August 2014 after the death of Conservative councillor John Pethard. The seat was held for the Conservatives by Angie Curtis with a majority of 59 votes over the UK Independence Party.

Warboys and Bury by-election 7 August 2014
Party	Candidate	Votes	%	±%
Conservative	Angie Curtis	619	46.6	−2.8
UKIP	Michael Tew	560	42.1	+9.2
Liberal Democrats	Christine Wills	78	5.9	−2.0
Labour	Mary Howell	72	5.4	−4.4
Majority		59	4.4	−12.1
Turnout		1,329	27.6	−8
Conservative hold		Swing		

=== St Neots Priory Park ===
A by-election was held on in St Neots Priory Park on 27 November 2014 after the death of Conservative councillor Paula Longford. The seat was held for the Conservatives by Ian Gardener with a majority of 111 votes over the UK Independence Party.

St Neots Priory Park by-election 27 November 2014
Party	Candidate	Votes	%	±%
Conservative	Ian Gardener	448	45.5	−2.9
UKIP	Carol Gamby	337	34.2	+7.4
Labour	Angela Hogan	199	20.2	+5.4
Majority		111	11.3	−10.3
Turnout		984	15	−17
Conservative hold		Swing		
