= James Palmer (politician, born 1969) =

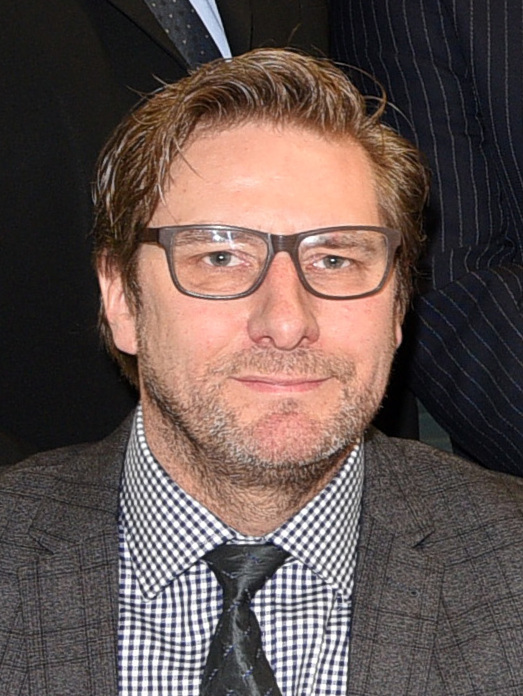
- Palmer in 2017

Mayor of Cambridgeshire and Peterborough
- In office 8 May 2017 – 9 May 2021
- Preceded by: Office established
- Succeeded by: Nik Johnson

Leader of East Cambridgeshire District Council
- In office May 2013 – May 2017
- Deputy: Charles Roberts
- Preceded by: Peter Moakes

Cambridgeshire County Councillor for Soham and Fordham Villages
- In office 4 June 2009 – 4 May 2017
- Preceded by: Judith Broadway
- Succeeded by: Seat abolished

Councillor for East Cambridgeshire District Council
- In office 3 May 2007 – 4 May 2017
- Ward: Soham North

Personal details
- Born: James Palmer; 2 October 1969 (age 56) Soham, Cambridgeshire
- Party: Conservative
- Children: 2

James Palmer (born 2 October 1969) is a former politician who was the first Mayor of Cambridgeshire and Peterborough between 2017 and 2021. As a councillor, he was previously leader of East Cambridgeshire District Council between May 2013 and May 2017. He was also a county councillor for the Soham and Fordham Villages electoral division of Cambridgeshire County Council between 2009 and 2017. Palmer was elected as the Conservative candidate on 4 May, 2017, however lost the subsequent 6 May 2021 election to Labour Party candidate Nik Johnson and announced his retirement from politics.

== Political career ==
=== As a councillor ===
Standing for The Conservative Party, Palmer was elected as East Cambridgeshire District Councillor for the Soham North ward for the first time in 2007 and re-elected in 2011 and 2015. He was elected as a Cambridgeshire County Councillor for the first time in 2009, in the Soham and Fordham Villages electoral division. He was re-elected in 2013. He was leader of East Cambridgeshire District Council from May 2013 until his election as Mayor of Cambridgeshire and Peterborough, when the post became automatically vacant. He also vacated his county councillor role at the same time. As leader of East Cambridgeshire District Council, he helped secure the funding for the Ely southern bypass to alleviate congestion in the city. Under his leadership the council also developed plans for £13.5 million leisure centre and a cinema complex for Ely. The new Hive Leisure Centre was opened in May 2018.

=== Mayoral election ===
Then leader of East Cambridgeshire District Council and a Cambridgeshire County Councillor, Palmer announced in December 2016 he would be campaigning to be the Conservative candidate for Mayor and was selected on 21 January 2017 following a hustings event.

In the run-up to the election, Palmer told Cambridge News, that he would invest in transport infrastructure to help business growth spread across the whole of Cambridgeshire and Peterborough and make job opportunities accessible to more people.

Palmer was elected Mayor of Cambridgeshire and Peterborough on 4 May 2017 with 88,826 votes (76,064 first preferences and 12,762 transfers under the supplementary vote system in the second round), and 56.9% of the final vote. Upon being elected he said: "I am immensely proud to be the first mayor of Cambridgeshire and Peterborough and I will do everything I can to make sure everybody is included in the future of this county."

=== As Mayor of Cambridgeshire and Peterborough ===
==== Policies ====
As mayor, Palmer's objectives were to construct the Cambridgeshire Autonomous Metro, including underground tunnelling in Cambridge, upgrade the A47 in Cambridgeshire to dual carriageway, deliver Peterborough's first university with degree-awarding powers and build more affordable homes, including through community land trusts. Palmer has also campaigned to reform the region's education system and for further devolution from Westminster.

===== Transport =====
Palmer aimed to progress with work on delivering a metro system in Cambridgeshire, with underground tunnelling in Cambridge city centre. Due to the significant estimated cost, Palmer investigated financing it through land value cap and tax increment financing (TIF) and investment from the private sector.

In March 2018 Palmer announced he would be supporting the A47 Alliance campaign for full dualling of the trunk road from the A1 near Peterborough to Lowestoft in Suffolk. He also supported the dualling of the A10 from Cambridge to Ely, and the eventual extension of the M11 north to the A47 to better connect the north and south of Cambridgeshire. In rail policy, he aimed to establish a rail link for Wisbech, build a station at Soham and deliver an interim station at Cambridge South by 2021 instead of the proposed 2025-27 timescales for the full station as proposed by East West Rail.

In 2020 Palmer announced that the Combined Authority had abandoned plans to build a new cycle and footbridge in St Neots, where the Combined Authority was contributing £3.1 million towards the original £4.6 million cost of the scheme. Costs had increased to £7.4 million and the Combined Authority Board in June 2018 concluded it did 'not offer value for money'. £800,000 of the funding had been spent on consultants before the decision was made.

===== Housing =====
Palmer developed the £100K home scheme which builds one bedroom houses and sells them for below market rate. By March 2021, eight homes had been delivered in Fordham and there were plans to build three more in Cambridge.

In March 2021, it was announced that central government would withdraw £45 million of funding that was earmarked to fund affordable housing in Cambridgeshire due to "insufficient progress" and poor value for money. The scheme was supposed to deliver 2000 new homes by 2022.

During the mayoral election campaign in 2021, the 100k policy was heavily criticised as giving 'false hope' and that the rate of progress was so slow that it would take 'a thousand years' to house everyone who was waiting for a home in the area. Labour sources also said that £8 million in loans were taken for the building of these £100K homes

The 100k housing programme was cancelled in July 2021 when it was also revealed that the eight homes built under the scheme remained empty.

===== Further devolution =====
In November 2017, Palmer joined other regional mayors to call for the UK government to allow further devolution to mayoral combined authorities. That included public services like skills, training and apprenticeships, as well as fiscal devolution to gain some control over taxes and revenues generated within combined authority areas. Palmer established an independent panel led by the chief executive of Adnams to investigate public sector reform in Cambridgeshire.

==== Administration ====
In September 2017, Palmer promoted a former colleague councillor at East Cambridgeshire District Council, Tom Hunt (who in 2019 became MP for Ipswich), to the combined authority as his chief of staff. In July 2020, Conservative Minister of State Simon Clarke wrote to Palmer criticising the appointment, stating "the legal advice behind the appointment of Tom Hunt contained significant omissions".

After concerns surfaced about the way the Greater Cambridge Greater Peterborough Local Enterprise Partnership (LEP) was being run, resulting in the Government holding back funding, Palmer wrote an open letter in September 2017 saying the organisation was no longer able to fulfil its purpose of supporting the area's business community. Palmer would later support its merging to with the Combined Authority, where it was proposed to operate under an independent Business Board. The Business Board, he said, "will involve the public and private sectors working together closely will provide a powerful business voice for Greater Cambridgeshire and Peterborough."

In September 2018, Palmer was accused of concealing the truth about whether the chief executive of CAPCA had resigned or been fired. Palmer insisted that he had resigned, but council leaders said that they thought "the evidence points to it being a dismissal", a decision which Palmer was not allowed to make unilaterally under CAPCA's constitution. It was later revealed that the chief executive received 94,500 in severance pay despite serving no notice period. Palmer approved the payment without consulting other members of the board and when challenged about it suggested the public were not "even slightly interested" in the circumstances surrounding it.

When running for Mayor, Palmer estimated the running costs of CAPCA would be £850,000 but by November 2018, costs had spiralled to £7.6 million in 2018, including £5.6 million on staff salaries. Palmer admitted he underestimated the cost of running the new combined authority and said his original predictions "were never going to be realistic". After the increase in costs was announced, Palmer sacked the chief finance officer of CAPCA.

In July 2020, Conservative Minister of State Simon Clarke wrote to the Mayor criticising him on a number of issues "…which suggest that the delivery capacity of the combined authority requires improvement." He was particularly concerned about "…disagreements between CAPCA and the Greater Cambridge Partnership…" which he feared might hinder delivery of projects. He also stated in the letter that "…a number of historical problems had been identified...", including the appointment of Tom Hunt as his chief of staff. Palmer blamed civil servants for the criticism.

=== Second mayoral election ===
Palmer stood as the incumbent in the 2021 Cambridgeshire and Peterborough mayoral election, held on 6 May of that year. Standing against Labour's Nik Johnson and Liberal Democrat Aidan Van de Weyer, he secured 40.5% of the first-round votes. With no candidate reaching the 50% threshold a second round was held between Palmer and Johnson. A large majority of supplementary votes went to the Labour candidate and the final count saw Palmer receive 48.7% of the total, with Johnson winning on 51.3%.

Following his defeat, Palmer announced that he would be retiring from politics.

== Personal life ==
His cousin is the Newcastle United and England international goalkeeper Nick Pope.
