= Mayor of Cambridgeshire and Peterborough =

Mayoral post in England

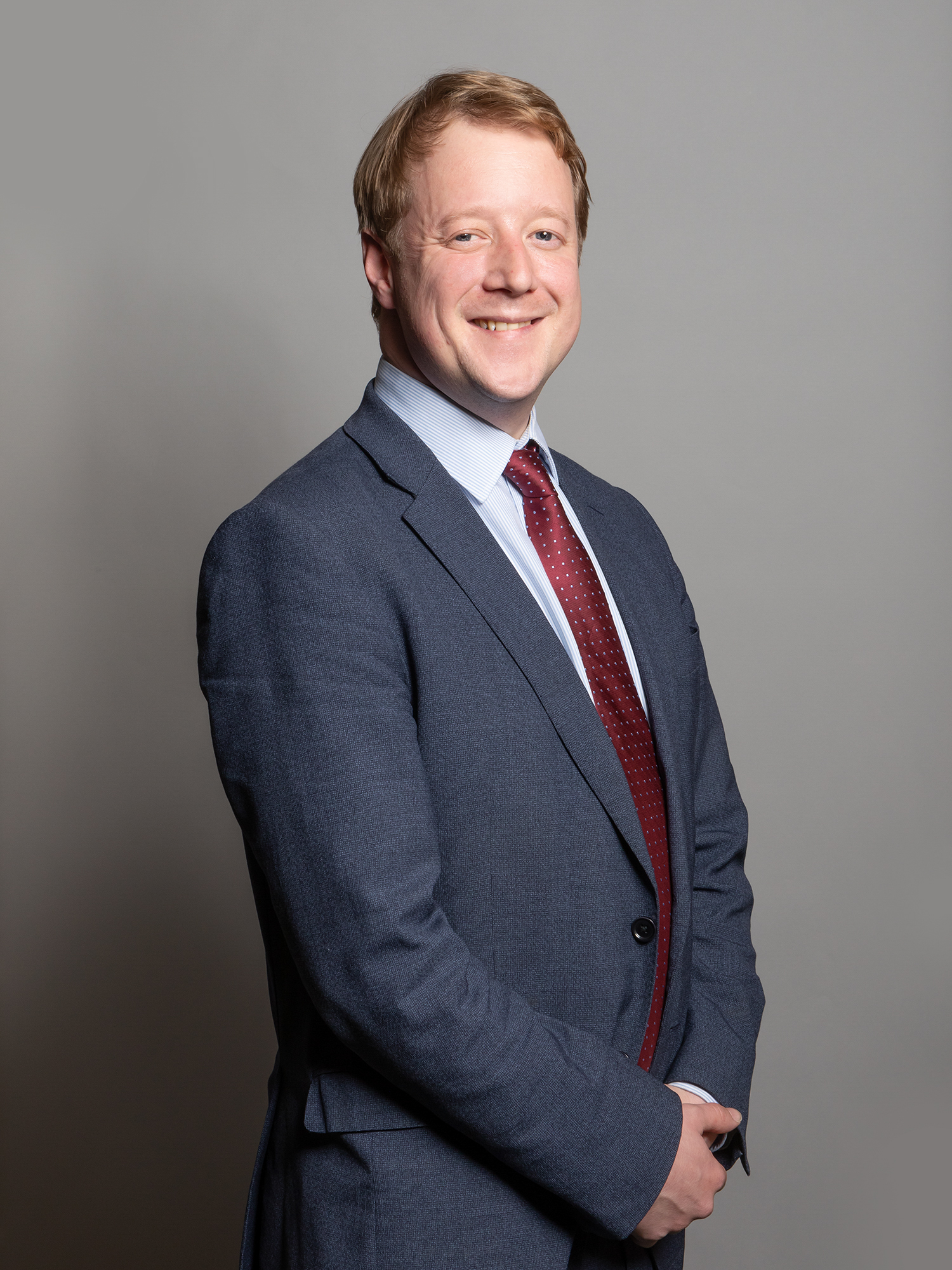
- Incumbent; Paul Bristow since 5 May 2025
- Style: Mayor
- Appointer: Electorate of Cambridgeshire and Peterborough
- Term length: Four years

The mayor of Cambridgeshire and Peterborough is a strategic authority mayor, first elected in May 2017. The mayor is leader of the Cambridgeshire and Peterborough Combined Authority.

This office was created under the Cities and Local Government Devolution Act 2016 which allowed for the creation of 'Metro mayors' to lead combined authorities in England.

The mayor is a member of the Mayoral Council for England and the Council of the Nations and Regions.

== List of mayors ==
Name	Portrait	Term of office		Elected	Political party	Previous and concurrent occupations
James Palmer		8 May 2017	9 May 2021	2017	Conservative	Leader of East Cambridgeshire District Council; Councillor for Cambridgeshire County Council; Councillor for East Cambridgeshire District Council
Nik Johnson		10 May 2021	4 May 2025	2021	Labour	Consultant Paediatrician at North West Anglia NHS Trust; Councillor for Huntingdonshire District Council
Paul Bristow		5 May 2025	Incumbent	2025	Conservative	Former MP

Timeline

== See also ==
- Cambridgeshire Police and Crime Commissioner
