= Cambridgeshire and Peterborough Combined Authority =

Strategic authority and combined authority in England

- Area covered by the Cambridgeshire and Peterborough Combined Authority

Type
- Type: Combined authority of Cambridgeshire
- Houses: Unicameral
- Term limits: None

History
- Founded: 3 March 2017

Leadership
- Mayor: Paul Bristow, Conservative

Structure
- Graph of the party split among 12 seats.
- Political groups: Conservatives (4) Liberal Democrats (4) Labour (2) Non-political (2)

Elections
- Voting system: Directly elected mayor since 2017
- Last election: 1 May 2025
- Next election: 3 May 2029

Meeting place
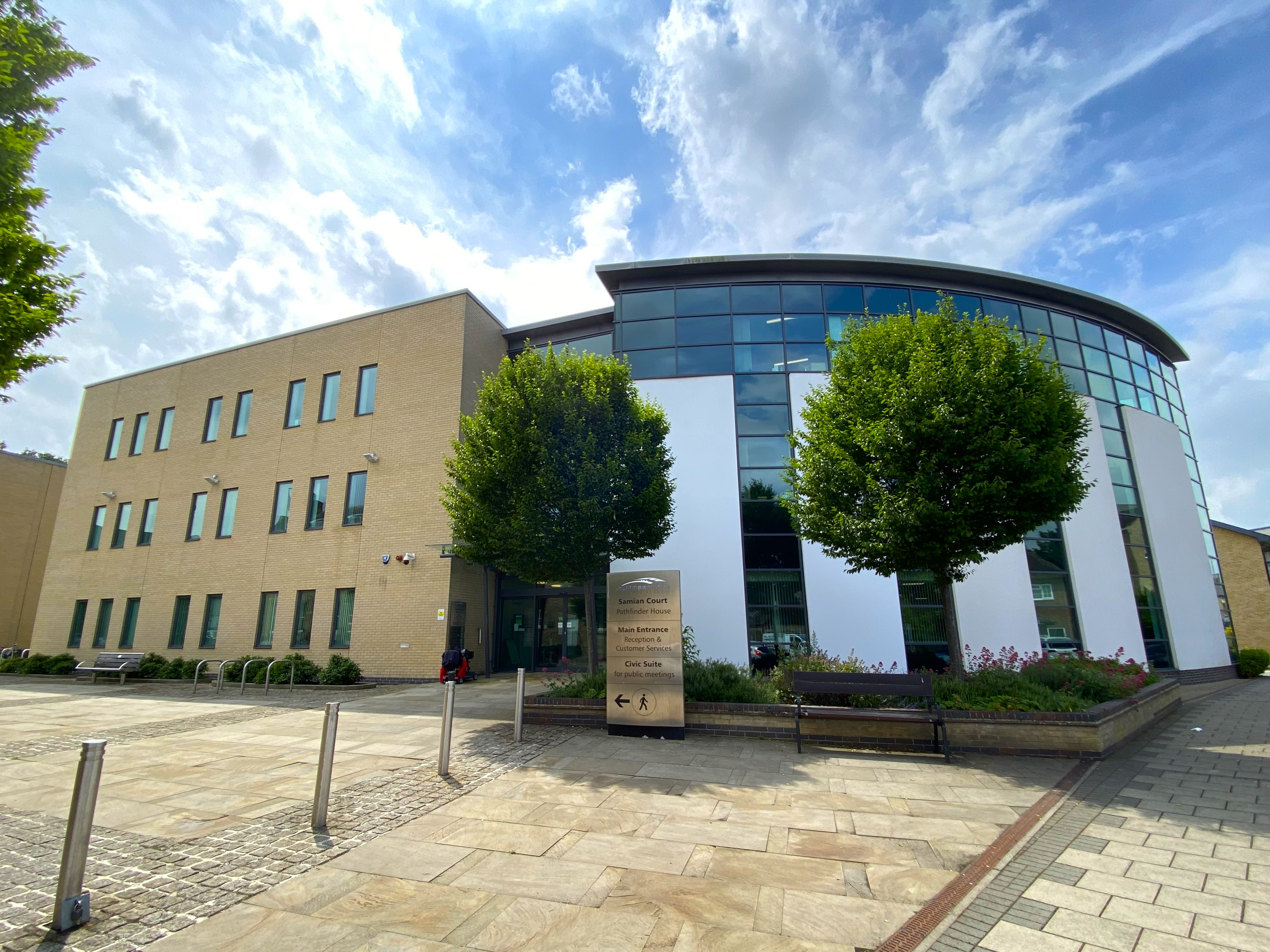
- Pathfinder House, St Mary’s Street, Huntingdon, PE29 3TN

Website
- https://cambridgeshirepeterborough-ca.gov.uk

The Cambridgeshire and Peterborough Combined Authority is a combined authority covering the ceremonial county of Cambridgeshire, England. The authority was established on 3 March 2017. The authority is led by the directly elected mayor of Cambridgeshire and Peterborough.

== History ==
Plans for a combined authority covering the entirety of East Anglia, including Norfolk and Suffolk, were announced by Chancellor of the Exchequer George Osborne on 16 March 2016 as part of the 2016 United Kingdom budget, with the aim of creating an "Eastern Powerhouse" analogous to the government's Northern Powerhouse concept. Norfolk and Suffolk had initially submitted separate devolution bids, but government ministers called for a joint bid including all three counties. Initial proposals had been agreed by all county and district councils in the region, with the exception of Cambridge City Council.

The East Anglia devolution deal was subsequently rejected by Cambridgeshire County Council, with Peterborough City Council also opposing the deal. Plans for devolution in the region were split in June 2016, with one deal for Cambridgeshire and Peterborough and a separate deal covering Norfolk and Suffolk. The Norfolk and Suffolk devolution deal was later scrapped, after several district councils withdrew.

The devolution deal was agreed by the constituent local councils in November 2016, and the first meeting of the shadow combined authority was held in December 2016. The draft statutory instrument required for formal establishment of the combined authority was laid in Parliament on 23 January, made on 2 March 2017, and came into force the following day.

== Responsibilities ==
As part of the devolution deal, the responsibilities of the combined authority will include the following:

- A £600 million budget for local economic growth (£20 million over 30 years)
- A £170 million budget for housing, including affordable and council housing, with £70 million specifically for housing in Cambridge
- Transport infrastructure improvement and maintenance
- Provision of skills training and apprenticeships
- Integration of local health and social care resources
- Integration of local employment services, and design of a National Work and Health Programme alongside the Department for Work and Pensions

== Mayor ==
The combined authority is chaired by a directly elected mayor. The first election was held on 4 May 2017 for a four-year term of office, with further elections in May 2021 and every fourth year thereafter. The mayor's salary has been reported to be £70,000 a year. The mayor is a member of the Mayoral Council for England and the Council of the Nations and Regions.

== Membership ==
Map of constituent local authorities. The area in pink is covered by Cambridgeshire County Council.: 1. Peterborough City Council (unitary authority); 2. Fenland District Council; 3. Huntingdonshire District Council; 4. East Cambridgeshire District Council; 5. South Cambridgeshire District Council; 6. Cambridge City Council

In addition to the elected mayor, the seven constituent local councils, Cambridgeshire County Council, Peterborough City Council, Cambridge City Council, East Cambridgeshire District Council, Fenland District Council, Huntingdonshire District Council and South Cambridgeshire District Council, each nominate one member of the combined authority. The Cambridgeshire Police and Crime Commissioner also sits on the combined authority, as do representatives appointed by the Cambridgeshire and Peterborough Fire Authority, the Business Board, and the Integrated Care Board. Substitute members are also nominated in case of absence.

Name	Position within nominating authority	Nominating authority
Paul Bristow	Mayor of Cambridgeshire and Peterborough	Direct election
Shabina Qayyum	Leader of the Council	Peterborough City Council
Lucy Nethsingha	Leader of the Council	Cambridgeshire County Council
Katie Thornburrow	Leader of the Council	Cambridge City Council
Anna Bailey	Leader of the Council	East Cambridgeshire District Council
Chris Boden	Leader of the Council	Fenland District Council
Sarah Conboy	Leader of the Council	Huntingdonshire District Council
Brian Milnes	Deputy Leader of the Council	South Cambridgeshire District Council
Darryl Preston	Cambridgeshire Police and Crime Commissioner	
Christopher Morris	Chairman	Cambridgeshire and Peterborough Fire Authority
Shaun Grady	Chairman	Business Board
Robin Porter	Representative	Integrated Care Board

The combined authority's administrative functions are hosted at Huntingdonshire District Council's headquarters at Pathfinder House in Huntingdon.
