= 2017 Cambridgeshire and Peterborough mayoral election =

2017 local election in England, UK

- 4 May 2017
- Turnout: 32.9%
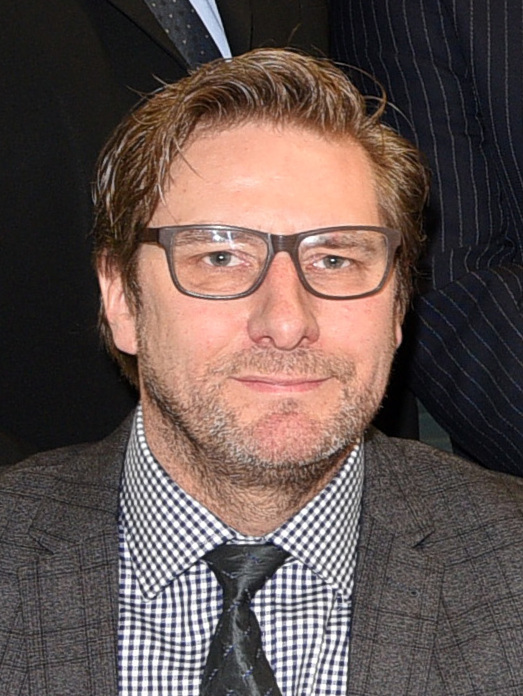

Candidate	James Palmer	Rod Cantrill	Kevin Price
Party	Conservative	Liberal Democrats	Labour
1st Round vote	76,064	47,026	37,297
Percentage	38.0%	23.5%	18.6%
2nd Round vote	88,826	67,205	Eliminated
Percentage	56.9%	43.1%	Eliminated
Candidate	Paul Bullen	Julie Howell
Party	UKIP	Green
1st Round vote	15,931	12,628
Percentage	8.0%	6.3%
2nd Round vote	Eliminated	Eliminated
Percentage	Eliminated	Eliminated
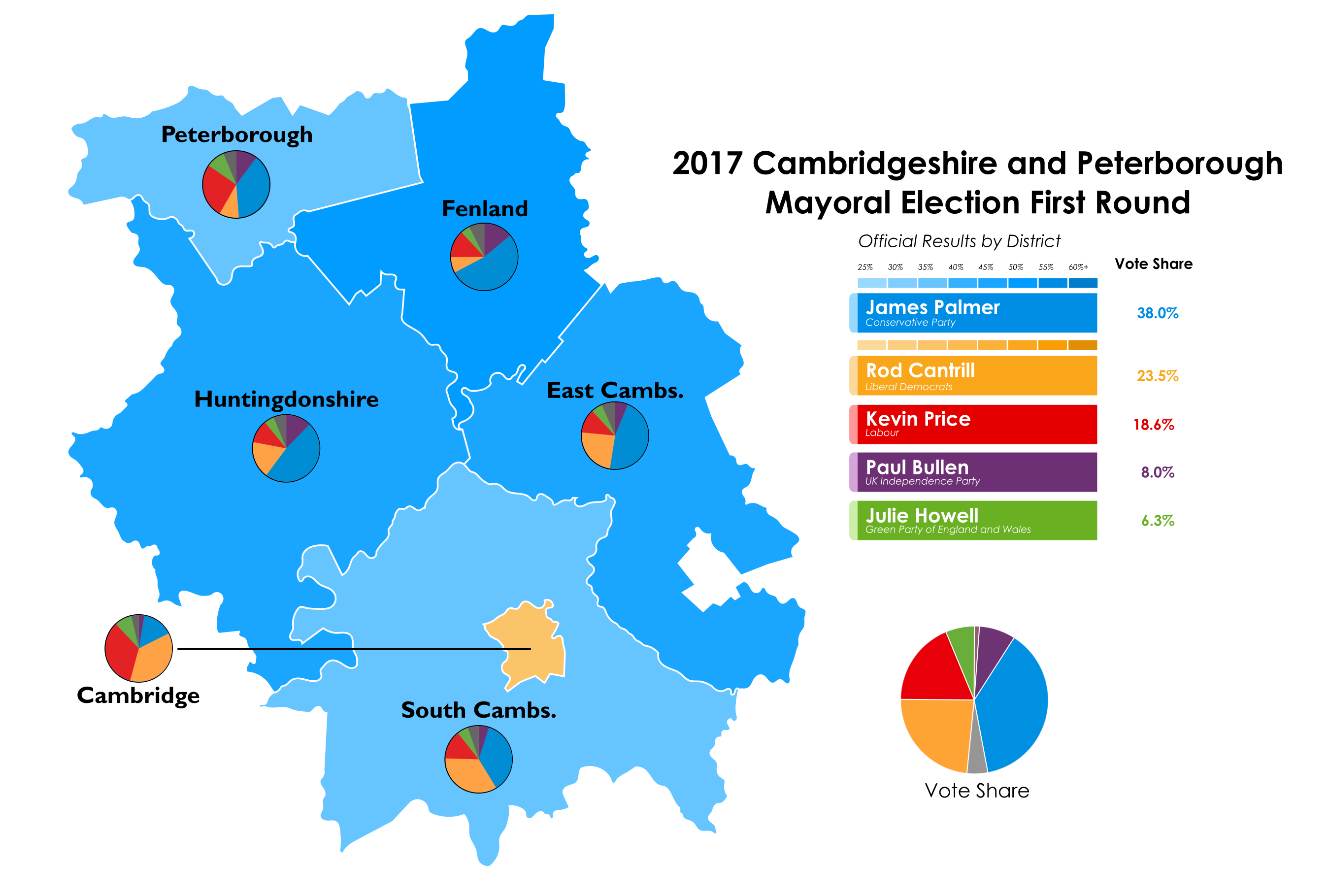
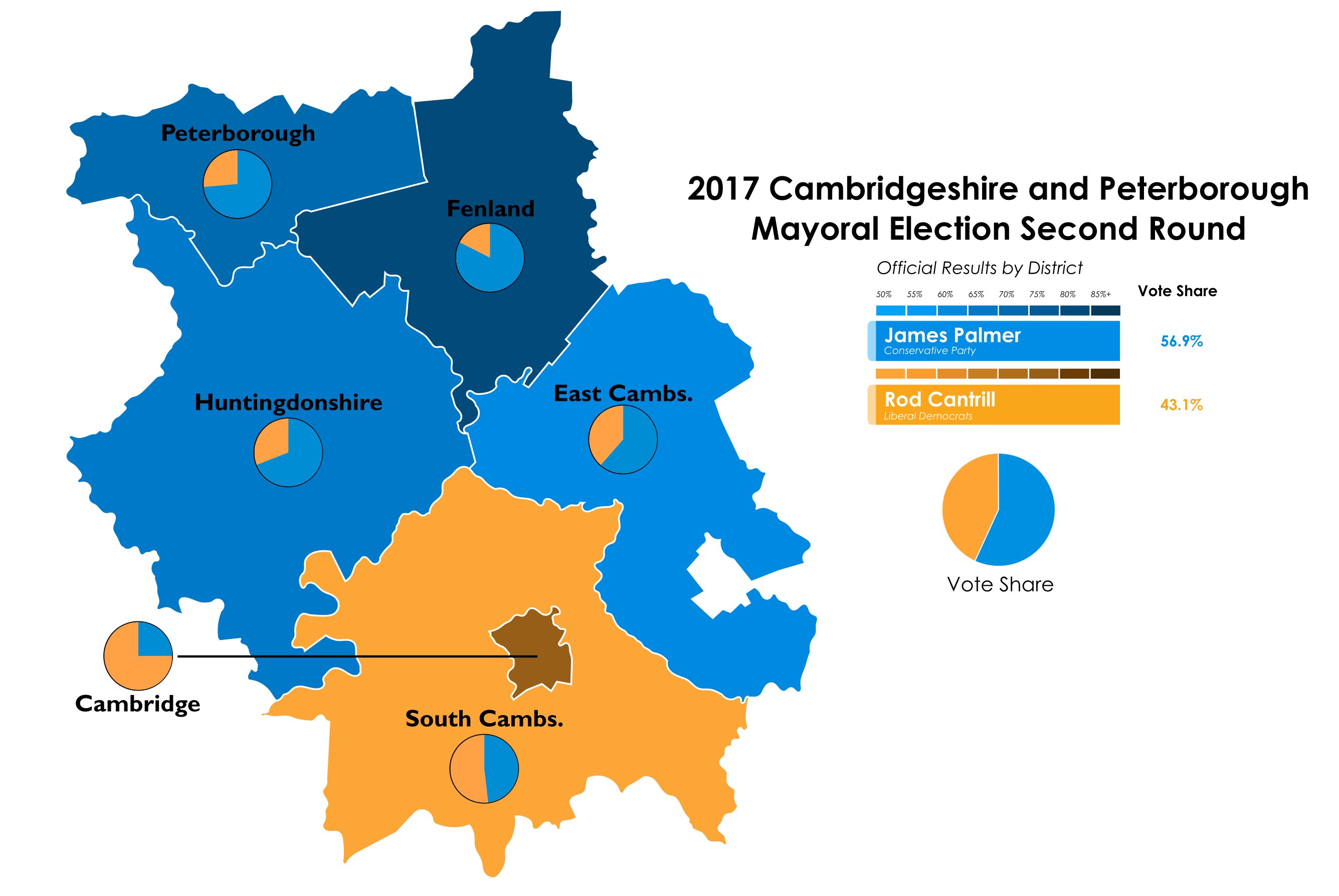
Mayor before election
Position established
Elected Mayor
James Palmer
Conservative

The inaugural Cambridgeshire and Peterborough mayoral election was held on 4 May 2017 to elect the Mayor of Cambridgeshire and Peterborough. The supplementary vote system was used to elect the mayor for a four-year term of office. Subsequent elections will be held in May 2021 and every four years after.

The mayor will lead the Cambridgeshire and Peterborough Combined Authority established in 2017 by the seven local councils in Cambridgeshire (Cambridgeshire County Council, Peterborough City Council, Cambridge City Council, East Cambridgeshire District Council, Fenland District Council, Huntingdonshire District Council and South Cambridgeshire District Council) as part of a devolution deal giving local government in the county additional powers and funding.

The mayoral election was on the same day as the Cambridgeshire County Council election being held across most of the county except Peterborough, which is administered separately as a unitary authority outside the area covered by the county council.

== Candidates ==
Area covered by the new mayor.

=== Conservative Party ===
James Palmer, leader of East Cambridgeshire District Council, was selected to be the Conservative Party candidate at a general meeting of party members on 21 January 2017. The shortlist for the selection process was announced on 14 January and consisted of three candidates:

- Steve Count, councillor for March North, leader of Cambridgeshire County Council and the first interim chairman of the combined authority.
- Roger Harrison, councillor for St Neots Eaton Socon and executive member for growth, Huntingdonshire District Council.
- James Palmer, district councillor for Soham North, county councillor for Soham and Fordham Villages and leader of East Cambridgeshire District Council.

Heidi Allen, MP for South Cambridgeshire since 2015, declared an intention to seek the Conservative nomination but was unsuccessful in reaching the final shortlist. Marco Cereste, former leader of Peterborough City Council, also failed to make the shortlist.

=== English Democrats ===
Stephen Goldspink, former Peterborough city councillor, was the English Democrats mayoral candidate.

=== Green Party ===
Julie Howell, Orton parish councillor and co-leader of Peterborough Green Party, was announced as the Green Party candidate on 19 January 2017 after a vote by party members.

=== Independent ===
Peter Dawe, former UKIP member and Ely-based social entrepreneur, stood as an independent candidate for mayor. On 25 January, Dawe announced he had chosen Peterborough-based entrepreneur Mark Ringer, founder and director of the Willow Festival, to be his unofficial running mate and deputy.

=== Labour Party ===
Kevin Price, deputy leader of Cambridge City Council and councillor for King's Hedges, was declared the winner of the Labour Party selection process on 6 February 2017 after defeating Fiona Onasanya, county councillor for King's Hedges, in a ballot of party members.

Other candidates who did not make the shortlist but were reported in local media as contesting the Labour Party selection included Peterborough City councillors Ed Murphy and Ansar Ali, 2015 Huntingdon parliamentary candidate Nik Johnson, and vice-chairman of Huntingdon CLP Samuel Sweek.

=== Liberal Democrats ===
Rod Cantrill, councillor for Newnham, Cambridge City Council, was announced as the Liberal Democrat candidate on 14 January 2017 following a ballot of party members.

=== United Kingdom Independence Party ===
Paul Bullen, councillor for St Ives and UKIP group leader, Cambridgeshire County Council, was confirmed as the party's candidate on 11 January 2017.

== Results ==
Nominations for candidates wishing to stand in the election closed on 4 April 2017, after which the final list of candidates was published by East Cambridgeshire District Council.

Cambridgeshire and Peterborough Mayoral Election 2017
Party	Candidate	1st round		2nd round			1st round votesTransfer votes, 2nd round
Party	Candidate	Total	Of round	Transfers	Total	Of round	1st round votesTransfer votes, 2nd round
Conservative	James Palmer	76,064	38.0%	12,762	88,826	56.9%	
Liberal Democrats	Rod Cantrill	47,026	23.5%	20,179	67,205	43.1%	
Labour	Kevin Price	37,297	18.6%				
UKIP	Paul Bullen	15,931	8.0%				
Green	Julie Howell	12,628	6.3%				
Independent	Peter Dawe	9,176	4.6%				
English Democrat	Stephen Goldspink	2,256	1.1%				
Turnout		200,378	32.9%				

== Results by local authority ==
First and second preference votes were counted by local authority and published online by East Cambridgeshire District Council.

=== First count results ===
Party	Candidate	Cambridge	East Cambs	Fenland	Huntingdonshire	Peterborough	South Cambs	Total
Conservative	James Palmer	5,384	9,980	10,513	19,914	12,629	17,644	76,064
Liberal Democrats	Rod Cantrill	13,273	5,174	1,494	7,395	3,100	16,590	47,026
Labour	Kevin Price	12,222	2,495	2,602	4,603	8,614	6,761	37,297
UKIP	Paul Bullen	966	1,336	2,754	5,111	3,359	2,405	15,931
Green	Julie Howell	3,029	1,156	879	1,982	3,012	2,570	12,628
Independent	Peter Dawe	1,204	1,288	959	2,140	1,207	2,378	9,176
English Democrats	Stephen Goldspink	113	120	519	424	851	229	2,256

=== Second count results ===
Party	Candidate	Cambridge		East Cambs		Fenland		Huntingdonshire		Peterborough		South Cambs		Total	
Party	Candidate	Transfers	Total	Transfers	Total	Transfers	Total	Transfers	Total	Transfers	Total	Transfers	Total	Transfers	Total
Conservative	James Palmer	1,243	6,627	1,125	11,105	1,599	12,112	3,246	23,160	3,040	15,669	2,509	20,153	12,762	88,826
Liberal Democrats	Rod Cantrill	6,684	19,957	1,799	6,973	1,086	2,580	2,995	10,390	2,516	5,616	5,099	21,689	20,179	67,205
