= Cambridgeshire County Council elections =

Local government elections in Cambridgeshire, England

Cambridgeshire County Council is elected every four years using the first past the post system of election. As of 2021 the council consists of 61 council seats, representing 59 electoral divisions.

== County council composition ==
Year	Conservative	Labour	Liberal Democrats (Note: Includes totals for the predecessors of the Liberal Democrats, the Liberal Party and SDP (both of which participated in the Alliance).)	Reform	Green	UKIP	Independents & Others	Council control after election
Local government reorganisation; council established (68 seats)
1973	18	11	5	–	–	–	13	No overall control
1977	56	7	1	–	0	–	4	Conservative
1981	35	19	11	–	0	–	3	Conservative
New division boundaries; seats increased from 68 to 77
1985	29	21	26	–	0	–	1	No overall control
1989	46	20	10	–	0	–	1	Conservative
1993	33	21	21	–	0	–	2	No overall control
Peterborough becomes a unitary authority; seats decreased from 77 to 59
1997	33	10	16	–	0	0	0	Conservative
2001	34	9	16	–	0	0	0	Conservative
New division boundaries; seats increased from 59 to 69
2005	42	4	23	–	0	0	0	Conservative
2009	42	2	23	–	1	1	0	Conservative
2013	32	7	14	–	0	12	4	No overall control
New division boundaries; seats decreased from 69 to 61
2017	36	7	15	–	0	0	3	Conservative
2021	28	9	20	0	0	0	4	No overall control
2025	10	5	31	10	3	0	2	Liberal Democrats

== County result maps ==
2005 results map

2009 results map

2013 results map

2017 results map

2021 results map

2025 results map

== By-election results ==
The following is an incomplete list of by-elections to Cambridgeshire County Council.

=== 1973-1976 ===
Trumpington By-Election, October 1975
Party	Candidate	Votes	%	±%
Conservative	Jane Brookes	1,056	63.5	
Labour	L. Ann Pettifor	493	29.6	
Liberal	Bernard Greaves	115	6.9	
Majority		563	33.8	
Turnout				
Conservative hold		Swing		

Romsey By-Election, February 1979
Party	Candidate	Votes	%	±%
Labour	John Hopkins	794	50.2	
Conservative	Gerald Cotman	501	31.6	
Liberal	Alan Charlesworth	288	18.1	
Majority		293	18.5	
Turnout				
Labour hold		Swing		

=== 1993−1997 ===
Abbey By-Election, 7 November 1996
Party	Candidate	Votes	%	±%
Labour	Colin Shaw	723	72.2	+6.9
Conservative	Simon Mitton	175	17.5	−3.4
Liberal Democrats	Evelyn Knowles	104	10.4	−3.4
Majority		548	54.7	+10.3
Turnout		1,002	20.6	
Labour hold		Swing		

=== 1997−2001 ===
Melbourn By-Election, 4 March 1999
Party	Candidate	Votes	%	±%
Liberal Democrats	R L Trueman	1,206	51.0	+14.1
Conservative		922	39.0	+5.4
Labour		236	10.0	−6.6
Majority		284	12.0	
Turnout		2,364	32.0	
Liberal Democrats hold		Swing		

Houghton & Wyton By-Election, 8 April 1999
Party	Candidate	Votes	%	±%
Conservative	S M Campbell	1,300	52.0	−3.9
Liberal Democrats		1,202	48.0	+18.8
Majority		98	4.0	
Turnout		2,502	34.0	
Conservative hold		Swing		

March East By-Election, 4 January 2001
Party	Candidate	Votes	%	±%
Conservative	Fred Yeulett	769	56.2	+13.1
Labour		313	22.9	−13.5
Liberal Democrats		177	12.9	−0.4
Independent		109	8.0	+8.0
Majority		456	33.3	
Turnout		1,368	17.3	
Conservative hold		Swing		

=== 2001−2005 ===
Newnham By-Election, 1 May 2003
Party	Candidate	Votes	%	±%
Liberal Democrats	Alexander Reid	930	51.3	−3.8
Conservative	C. Gail Kenney	376	20.7	+1.5
Labour	Daphne Roper	290	16.0	−9.6
Green	Anna Gomori-Woodcock	218	12.0	+12.0
Majority		554	30.6	+1.1
Turnout		1,814	23.6	
Liberal Democrats hold		Swing		

Melbourn By-Election, 2 October 2003
Party	Candidate	Votes	%	±%
Liberal Democrats	Anthony Stuart Milton	1,298	56.9	+19.5
Conservative	David Leon Porter	985	43.1	+2.9
Majority		313	13.8	
Turnout		2,283	30.7	
Liberal Democrats gain from Conservative		Swing		

Fulbourn By-Election, 10 June 2004
Party	Candidate	Votes	%	±%
Conservative	Colin Barker	1,392	45.5	+16.3
Liberal Democrats	Frances Amrani	1,057	34.5	+22.0
Labour	Martin Evans	613	20.0	−25.5
Majority		335	11.0	
Turnout		3,062	46.0	
Conservative gain from Labour		Swing		

Castle By-Election, 10 December 2004
Party	Candidate	Votes	%	±%
Liberal Democrats	John White	922	55.8	−1.5
Conservative	Robert Boorman	280	16.9	−2.5
Labour	Jane Jacks	276	16.7	−6.6
Green	Stephen Lawrence	117	7.1	+7.1
UKIP	Helene Davies	58	3.5	+3.5
Majority		642	38.9	+4.9
Turnout		1,653	23.7	
Liberal Democrats hold		Swing		

=== 2005−2009 ===
Ely South and West By-Election, 19 January 2006
Party	Candidate	Votes	%	±%
Liberal Democrats	Simon Higginson	1,140	60.0	+3.8
Conservative	Roderick Mair	583	30.7	−13.1
Green	Andrew Allen	105	5.5	+5.5
Labour	Fiona Ross	72	3.8	+3.8
Majority		557	29.3	
Turnout		1,900	32.5	
Liberal Democrats hold		Swing		

Romsey By-Election, 4 May 2006
Party	Candidate	Votes	%	±%
Liberal Democrats	Alice Douglas	955	40.2	−4.8
Labour	Paul Gilchrist	656	27.6	−5.7
Green	Jesse Griffiths	265	11.2	+0.4
Conservative	Richard Normington	258	10.9	+1.2
Respect	Denise Knowelden	240	10.1	+10.1
Majority		299	12.6	
Turnout		2,374	37.1	
Liberal Democrats hold		Swing		

Somersham and Earith By-Election, 12 October 2006
Party	Candidate	Votes	%	±%
Conservative	Stephen Criswell	1,377	68.0	+18.8
Liberal Democrats	Anthony Hulme	566	28.0	−9.4
Labour	Richard Allen	81	4.0	−9.4
Majority		811	40.0	
Turnout		2,024	28.2	
Conservative hold		Swing		

Little Paxton and St Neot's North By-Election, 3 May 2007
Party	Candidate	Votes	%	±%
Conservative	Kenneth Churchill	2,412	52.9	+3.3
Liberal Democrats	Robert Eaton	1,885	41.4	+8.5
Labour	Richard Allen	260	5.7	−11.8
Majority		527	11.5	
Turnout		4,557	37.5	
Conservative hold		Swing		

Sutton By-Election, 3 May 2007
Party	Candidate	Votes	%	±%
Conservative	Philip Read	1,077	47.5	+4.3
Liberal Democrats	Ian Dewar	574	25.3	−31.5
Independent	Kenneth Winters	485	21.4	+21.4
Labour	Fiona Ross	130	5.7	+5.7
Majority		503	22.2	
Turnout		2,266	36.6	
Conservative gain from Liberal Democrats		Swing		

Roman Bank and Peckover By-Election, 3 January 2008
Party	Candidate	Votes	%	±%
Conservative	Peter Humphrey	897	61.1	+2.1
Labour	Barry Diggle	380	25.9	+25.9
UKIP	Paul Clapp	192	13.1	+13.1
Majority		517	35.2	
Turnout		1,469	21.9	
Conservative hold		Swing		

Romsey By-Election, 1 May 2008
Party	Candidate	Votes	%	±%
Liberal Democrats	Kilian Bourke	781	37.0	−8.0
Labour	Chris Freeman	597	28.3	−5.0
Conservative	Mike Morley	289	13.7	+4.0
Green	Keith Garrett	237	11.2	+0.4
Left List	Andrew Osborne	207	9.8	+9.8
Majority		184	8.7	
Turnout		2,111	33.1	
Liberal Democrats hold		Swing		

Hardwick By-Election, 27 November 2008
Party	Candidate	Votes	%	±%
Liberal Democrats	Fiona Whelan	1,369	49.9	+14.5
Conservative	John Ionides	1,169	42.6	+1.3
Labour	Helen Haugh	208	7.6	−7.4
Majority		200	7.3	
Turnout		2,746	36.0	
Liberal Democrats gain from Conservative		Swing		

=== 2009-2013 ===
Ramsey Election, 23 July 2009
Party	Candidate	Votes	%	±%
UKIP	Peter Reeve	865	45.3	+45.3
Conservative	Susan Normington	682	35.7	−10.6
Liberal Democrats	Anthony Hulme	308	16.1	−21.5
Labour	Susan Coomey	53	2.8	−13.3
Majority		183	9.6	
Turnout		1,908	30.1	
UKIP gain from Conservative		Swing		

Wisbech North by-election, 15 April 2010
Party	Candidate	Votes	%	±%
Conservative	Samantha Hoy	548	34.8	−6.9
Liberal Democrats	David Patrick	506	32.1	+20.0
Labour	Barry Diggle	287	18.2	+2.7
UKIP	Paul Clapp	233	14.8	−15.9
Majority		42	2.7	
Turnout		1,574	21.1	
Conservative hold		Swing		

By-election called following the death of Leslie Sims.

East Chesterton by-election, 16 September 2010
Party	Candidate	Votes	%	±%
Liberal Democrats	Ian Manning	832	40.9	+5.1
Labour	Gerri Bird	663	32.6	+17.6
Conservative	Matthew Bradney	334	16.4	−8.4
Green	Peter Pope	117	5.7	−9.0
Cambridge Socialists	Anna Gordon	53	2.6	+2.6
UKIP	Peter Burkinshaw	37	1.8	−8.0
Majority		169	8.3	
Turnout		2,036	30.5	
Liberal Democrats hold		Swing		

By-election called following the resignation of Siep Wijsenbeek.

March North by-election, 3 March 2011
Party	Candidate	Votes	%	±%
Conservative	Steve Count	616	52.4	−3.4
Labour	Louis Sugden	282	24.0	+10.3
Liberal Democrats	William McAdam	277	23.6	−6.9
Majority		334	28.4	
Turnout		1,175	21.0	
Conservative hold		Swing		

By-election following death of John West

Arbury by-election, 5 May 2011
Party	Candidate	Votes	%	±%
Labour	Paul Sales	1,214	37.9	+8.9
Liberal Democrats	Amy Ellis	1,078	33.7	−8.3
Conservative	Shapour Meftah	496	15.5	−0.3
Green	Martin Bonner	411	12.8	−0.4
Majority		136	4.3	
Turnout		3,199	47.0	
Labour gain from Liberal Democrats		Swing		

=== 2013−2017 ===
Willingham by-election, 22 May 2014
Party	Candidate	Votes	%	±%
Conservative	Peter Hudson	1,252	41.8	+2.2
UKIP	Martin Hale	642	21.4	−7.1
Labour	Ben Monks	471	15.7	−1.7
Liberal Democrats	Susan Gymer	338	11.3	+4.7
Green	Helen Stocks	295	9.8	+1.9
Majority		610	20.3	
Turnout		2,998	38.4	
Conservative hold		Swing		

By-election following resignation of Ray Manning on 2 April 2014.

Bar Hill by-election, 12 February 2015
Party	Candidate	Votes	%	±%
Conservative	Lynda Harford	787	46.0	+0.6
UKIP	Martin Hale	251	14.7	−7.3
Liberal Democrats	Fiona Whelan	238	13.9	+5.4
Labour	Alex Smith	235	13.7	+0.1
Green	Claudia Roland	200	11.7	+2.3
Majority		536	31.3	
Turnout		1,711	23.6	
Conservative hold		Swing		

By-election held following the death of John Reynolds.

Whittlesey North by-election, 7 May 2015
Party	Candidate	Votes	%	±%
Conservative	Chris Boden	2,237	56.2	+0.6
UKIP	Paul Edwards	1,131	28.4	−1.1
Liberal Democrats	David Chapman	615	15.4	+15.4
Majority		1,106	27.8	
Turnout		3,983	65.5	
Conservative hold		Swing		

By-election following resignation of Martin Curtis on 22 March 2015.

Wisbech South by-election, 4 June 2015
Party	Candidate	Votes	%	±%
Conservative	Samantha Hoy	1,020	63.8	+32.4
UKIP	Susan Carson	298	18.6	−19.6
Labour	Dean Reeves	219	13.7	−2.7
Liberal Democrats	Josie Ratcliffe	61	3.8	−10.1
Majority		722	45.2	
Turnout		1,908	20.0	
Conservative gain from UKIP		Swing		

The by-election was triggered by the resignation of Councillor Peter Lagoda, who was elected for the UK Independence Party, following his conviction for benefit fraud.

Romsey by-election, 25 June 2015
Party	Candidate	Votes	%	±%
Labour	Zoe Moghadas	829	37.3	+5.6
Liberal Democrats	Nichola Martin	782	35.2	−12.7
Green	Debbie Aitchison	467	21.0	+15.1
Conservative	Raja Rahatul	100	4.5	+0.1
UKIP	Richard Jeffs	46	2.1	−3.0
Majority		47	2.1	
Turnout		2,224	32.5	
Labour gain from Liberal Democrats		Swing		

By-election following the resignation of Killian Bourke on 11 May 2015.

Chatteris by-election, 14 October 2015
Party	Candidate	Votes	%	±%
UKIP	Richard Mandley	600	41.0	+6.2
Conservative	Alan Melton	590	40.3	+5.8
Liberal Democrats	John Freeman	274	18.7	−2.6
Majority		10	0.7	
Turnout		1,464	23.5	
UKIP hold		Swing		

By-election following the death of Sandra Rylance.

Sutton by-election, 18 February 2016
Party	Candidate	Votes	%	±%
Liberal Democrats	Lorna Dupré	1,063	52.5	+19.8
Conservative	Mike Bradley	651	32.2	−17.2
UKIP	Pete Bigsby	208	10.3	+10.3
Independent	Owen Winters	102	5.0	+5.0
Majority		412	20.3	
Turnout		2,044	31.6	
Liberal Democrats gain from Conservative		Swing		

The by-election was triggered by the death of Councillor Phil Read, who was elected as a Conservative.

St. Neots Eaton Socon and Eynesbury by-election, 5 May 2016
Party	Candidate	Votes	%	±%
St Neots Independents	Simone Taylor	1,104	34.2	
Conservative	Karl Wainwright	1,024	31.7	
Labour	Nik Johnson	625	19.3	
Independent	James Corley	479	14.8	
Majority		80	2.5	
Turnout		3,232	27.0	
St Neots Independents hold		Swing		

By-election following the death of Councillor Steven Van de Kerkhove in January 2016. 2-member division.

=== 2017−2021 ===
Soham North and Isleham by-election, 4 October 2018
Party	Candidate	Votes	%	±%
Conservative	Mark Goldsack	858	48.8	−17.4
Liberal Democrats	Victoria Charlesworth	527	30.0	+12.5
Labour	Lee Jinks	191	10.9	−5.5
Independent	Geoffrey Woollard	182	10.4	+10.4
Majority		331	18.8	−30.0
Turnout		1,772	21.2	−5.7
Conservative hold		Swing	−15.0	

The by-election was triggered by the resignation of Conservative councillor Paul Raynes, who stepped down after taking up a role at the Cambridgeshire and Peterborough Combined Authority.

Trumpington by-election, 2 May 2019
Party	Candidate	Votes	%	±%
Liberal Democrats	Barbara Ashwood	1,328	46.7	+7.7
Labour	Rob Grayston	741	26.0	−3.6
Conservative	Shapour Meftah	452	15.9	−8.4
Green	Beverley Carpenter	325	11.4	+4.3
Majority		587	20.6	+11.2
Turnout		2,883	37.0	−7.3
Liberal Democrats hold		Swing	+5.6	

The by-election was triggered by the resignation of independent councillor Donald Adey, who had moved from Cambridge to Fife, Scotland, and said representing Trumpington had become difficult from 400 miles away.

Duxford by-election, 27 February 2020
Party	Candidate	Votes	%	±%
Liberal Democrats	Peter McDonald	1,607	59.6	+26.3
Conservative	Stephen Edwards	1,090	40.4	−14.7
Majority		517	19.2	−2.7
Turnout		2,711	32.5	−13.7
Liberal Democrats gain from Conservative		Swing	+20.5	

The by-election was triggered by the resignation of Conservative councillor Peter Topping, who stepped down after deciding to move to Northumberland.

=== 2021−2025 ===
St Neots The Eatons by-election, 16 February 2023
Party	Candidate	Votes	%	±%
Liberal Democrats	Geoffrey Seeff	1,042	43.5	+43.5
Conservative	Andrew Jennings	746	31.1	−5.3
Independent	Colin Maslen	360	15.0	+15.0
Labour	Taylor Purdon	250	10.4	−2.5
Majority		296	12.3	
Turnout		2,398		
Liberal Democrats gain from St Neots Independents		Swing		

The by-election was triggered by the death of St Neots Independents councillor Derek Giles.

Arbury by-election, 4 May 2023
Party	Candidate	Votes	%	±%
Labour	Mike Black	1,174	43.0	–5.2
Conservative	Robert Boorman	761	27.9	+11.1
Green	Stephen Lawrence	397	14.6	+1.2
Liberal Democrats	Sam Oliver	396	14.5	–7.2
Majority		413	15.1	
Turnout		2,728		
Labour hold		Swing		

The by-election was triggered by the resignation of Labour councillor Hilary Cox Condron, who cited her mental health.

Soham South and Haddenham by-election, 4 May 2023
Party	Candidate	Votes	%	±%
Conservative	Bill Hunt	1,568	44.6	−6.9
Liberal Democrats	Connor Docwra	1,276	36.3	+12.8
Labour	Simon Patenall	379	10.8	−6.8
Green	Pip Gardner	293	8.3	+0.8
Majority		292	8.3	
Turnout		3,567		
Conservative hold		Swing		

The by-election was triggered by the resignation of Conservative councillor Dan Schumann.

Yaxley and Farcet: 21 March 2024
Party	Candidate	Votes	%	±%
Liberal Democrats	Andrew Wood	509	31.0	+5.6
Conservative	Kev Gulson	470	28.6	–28.3
Independent	Sally Howell	448	27.3	New
Labour	Richard Ilett	175	10.6	–7.1
Green	Ellisa Westerman	42	2.6	New
Majority		39	2.4	N/A
Turnout		1,648	20.0	–7.2
Registered electors		8,259		
Liberal Democrats gain from Conservative		Swing	+16.9	

The by-election was triggered by the death of Conservative councillor Mac McGuire.

=== 2025−2029 ===
Roman Bank and Peckover by-election, 25 June 2026
Party	Candidate	Votes	%	±%
Reform	Chris Tirrell	1,009	39.0	−5.6
Conservative	Jackie Doyle-Price	983	38.0	+8.7
Liberal Democrats	Diane Cutler	414	16.0	−3.1
Labour	Benedict Allen	105	4.1	+0.2
Green	Jonathon Lilley	76	2.9	−0.2
Majority		26	1.0	
Turnout		2,587		
Reform hold		Swing		

The by-election was triggered by the disqualification of Reform UK councillor Andy Osborn, after he was convicted of publishing a false claim about a rival candidate.

Ramsey and Bury by-election, 16 July 2026
Party	Candidate	Votes	%	±%
Reform	Howard Tobias	506	29.7	−17.3
Independent	Steve Corney	417	24.5	+24.5
Conservative	Adela Costello	412	24.2	−5.2
Liberal Democrats	Sharon Docherty	126	7.4	+0.7
Green	Francis Reid	123	7.2	+1.2
Labour	Neil Shailer	118	6.9	−4.0
Majority		89	5.2	
Turnout		1,713		
Reform hold		Swing		

The by-election was triggered by the resignation of Reform UK councillor Jim Sidlow, who cited personal and family pressures.

== See also ==
- Cambridge local elections
- East Cambridgeshire local elections
- Fenland local elections
- Huntingdonshire local elections
- Peterborough local government
- South Cambridgeshire local elections
