= 2005 Cambridgeshire County Council election =

2005 UK local government election

- 5 May 2005

All 69 seats to Cambridgeshire County Council 35 seats needed for a majority
- Turnout: 63.1%

	First party	Second party	Third party
Leader	John Walters	Julian Huppert	Ian Kidman
Party	Conservative	Liberal Democrats	Labour
Leader since	13 May 1997	October 2004	May 2004
Leader's seat	Sawtry and Ellington	East Chesterton	Arbury (Defeated)
Last election	34 seats, 40.5%	16 seats, 31.5%	9 seats, 25.5%
Seats before	33	17	8
Seats won	42	23	4
Seat change	▲8	▲7	▼5
Popular vote	112,543	104,310	43,630
Percentage	41.0%	38.0%	15.9%
Swing	▲0.5%	▲6.5%	▼9.6%
- Results by electoral division. Striped wards have mixed representation.
Leader before election
Keith Walters
Conservative
Leader after election
Keith Walters
Conservative

An election to Cambridgeshire County Council took place on 5 May 2005 as part of the 2005 United Kingdom local elections. The election took place on the same day as the 2005 United Kingdom General Election. 69 councillors were elected from 60 electoral divisions, which returned either one or two county councillors each by first-past-the-post voting. New electoral division boundaries were brought in for this election, increasing the number of seats from the 59 seats at the 2001 Cambridgeshire County Council election. The Conservative Party retained their majority on the council, while the Labour Party lost all their rural councillors with their representation limited to the city of Cambridge.

== Previous composition ==
=== 2001 election ===
Party	Seats
Conservative	34
Liberal Democrats	16
Labour	9
Total	59

=== Composition of council seats before election ===
Party	Seats
Conservative	33
Liberal Democrats	17
Labour	8
Independent	1
Total	59

=== Changes between elections ===
In between the 2001 election and the 2005 election, the following council seats changed hands:

Division	Date	Previous Party	New Party	Cause	Resulting Council Composition			
Division	Date	Previous Party	New Party	Cause	Con	LDem	Lab	Ind
Melbourn	2 October 2003	Conservative	Liberal Democrats	Incumbent councillor resigned. Liberal Democrat won by-election.	33	17	9	0
Fulbourn	10 June 2004	Labour	Conservative	Incumbent councillor resigned. Conservative won by-election.	34	17	8	0
Buckden	Between June 2004 and April 2005	Conservative	Independent	Councillor quit party to sit as an independent member.	33	17	8	1

== Summary ==
=== Election result ===
Cambridgeshire County Council election, 2005
Party	Candidates	Seats	Gains	Losses	Net gain/loss	Seats %	Votes %	Votes	+/−
Conservative	69	42	13	5	▲8	60.9	41.0	112,543	+0.6
Liberal Democrats	69	23	10	3	▲7	33.3	38.0	104,310	+6.5
Labour	52	4	0	5	▼5	4.3	15.9	43,630 (Note: Includes Labour Co-operative)	–9.6
Green	26	0	0	0	Steady	0.0	4.0	10,979	+2.0
Independent	2	0	0	0	Steady	0.0	0.6	1,625	+0.6
UKIP	5	0	0	0	Steady	0.0	0.4	1,090	+0.4
Total	223	69	▲10					274,177	

Popular vote
Conservative	41.05%
Liberal Democrats	38.04%
Labour	15.91%
Green	4.00%
Other	0.99%

Council seats
Conservative	60.87%
Liberal Democrats	33.33%
Labour	5.80%

=== Party strength by electoral division ===
The following maps show the percentage of the vote each party obtained by electoral division. A colour key for each map can be viewed by clicking on the image.

Conservative Party	Liberal Democrats
Labour Party	Green Party

=== Election of Group Leaders ===
John Walters (Sawtry and Ellington) was re-elected leader of the Conservative Group with John Reynolds (Bar Hill) re-elected as the deputy leader, Julian Huppert (East Chesterton) was re-elected leader of the Lib Dem Group with Judith Broadway (Soham and Fordham Villages) as the deputy leader, and Martin Ballard (Coleridge) was elected leader of the Labour Group with Christine Carter (Cherry Hinton) as the deputy leader.

Huppert would stand down as leader in May 2007 and was replaced by David Jenkins (Cottenham, Histon and Impington) with Peter Downes (Brampton and Kimbolton) as his deputy. Ballard would stand down as leader in May 2008 to be replaced with Paul Sales (Abbey).

=== Election of Leader of the Council ===
John Walters the leader of the conservative group was duly elected leader of the council and formed a conservative administration.

Walters would retire as leader in May 2007 to be succeeded by Shona Johnston (Willingham) who had been the Cabinet Member for Children and Young People's Services. Dennis Pegram (St Ives) was elected as deputy leader. However Johnstone was forced to resign after less than 6 months after admitting making an "inappropriate" phone call to a chief executive candidate. Walters would return as leader until May 2008 when Jill Tuck (Waldersey) replaced him with Lawrence McGuire (Norman Cross) as her deputy.

== Results by district ==
=== Cambridge ===
==== Summary ====
Cambridge District Summary
Party	Seats	+/-	Votes	%	+/-
Liberal Democrats	10	▲3	22,508	43.17	+3.60
Labour	4	▼3	14,347	27.52	−7.12
Conservative	0	Steady	9,939	19.06	−3.28
Green	0	Steady	5,222	10.02	+6.87
UKIP	0	Steady	122	0.23	+0.23
Total	14	Steady	52,138	100.0	

==== Division results ====
Abbey
Party	Candidate	Votes	%
Labour Co-op	Paul Sales	1,384	39.9
Liberal Democrats	Edward Sexton	1,033	29.8
Conservative	Simon Mitton	631	18.2
Green	Margaret Wright	416	12.0
Majority		351	10.1
Turnout		3,464	55.5
Registered electors		6,244	
Labour Co-op win (new boundaries)			

Arbury
Party	Candidate	Votes	%
Liberal Democrats	Rupert Moss-Eccardt	1,686	41.0
Labour Co-op	Ian Kidman *	1,386	33.7
Conservative	Shapour Meftah	743	18.1
Green	Michael Smith	295	7.2
Majority		300	7.3
Turnout		4,110	60.6
Registered electors		6,788	
Liberal Democrats win (new boundaries)			

Castle
Party	Candidate	Votes	%
Liberal Democrats	John White *	2,132	52.2
Conservative	Robert Boorman	767	18.8
Labour	Jane Jacks	733	17.9
Green	Stephen Lawrence	451	11.1
Majority		1,365	33.4
Turnout		4,083	62.6
Registered electors		6,527	
Liberal Democrats win (new boundaries)			

Cherry Hinton
Party	Candidate	Votes	%
Labour	Christine Carter *	1,633	40.5
Liberal Democrats	Benjamin Hutchings	1,105	27.4
Conservative	Edward MacNaghten	1,054	26.2
Green	Neil Ford	237	5.9
Majority		528	13.1
Turnout		4,029	64.0
Registered electors		6,292	
Labour win (new boundaries)			

Coleridge
Party	Candidate	Votes	%
Labour	Martin Ballard *	1,255	35.9
Liberal Democrats	Andrew Blackhurst	1,203	34.4
Conservative	Steve Jones	718	20.6
Green	Marilyn Carter	241	6.9
UKIP	Albert Watts	77	2.2
Majority		52	1.5
Turnout		3,494	59.9
Registered electors		5,829	
Labour win (new boundaries)			

East Chesterton
Party	Candidate	Votes	%
Liberal Democrats	Julian Huppert *	1,411	39.2
Labour	Janet Robertson	1,187	32.9
Conservative	Kevin Francis	694	19.3
Green	Peter Pope	306	8.5
Majority		224	6.2
Turnout		3,598	60.8
Registered electors		5,916	
Liberal Democrats win (new boundaries)			

King's Hedges
Party	Candidate	Votes	%
Labour	Primrose Hughes	1,228	36.9
Liberal Democrats	Clive Hollins	1,129	33.9
Conservative	Rhona Boorman	728	21.9
Green	Gerhard Goldbeck-Wood	243	7.3
Majority		99	3.0
Turnout		3,328	55.2
Registered electors		6,027	
Labour win (new boundaries)			

Market
Party	Candidate	Votes	%
Liberal Democrats	Gaynor Griffiths	1,877	50.1
Conservative	Timothy Haire	665	17.8
Labour	Elizabeth Walter	610	16.3
Green	Martin Lucas-Smith	592	15.8
Majority		1,212	32.4
Turnout		3,744	57.5
Registered electors		6,514	
Liberal Democrats win (new boundaries)			

Newnham
Party	Candidate	Votes	%
Liberal Democrats	Alexander Reid *	1,978	50.7
Conservative	Alasdair Ross	703	18.0
Labour	Rita Gaggs	671	17.2
Green	Anna Gomori-Woodcock	553	14.2
Majority		1,275	32.7
Turnout		3,905	62.1
Registered electors		6,287	
Liberal Democrats win (new boundaries)			

Petersfield
Party	Candidate	Votes	%
Liberal Democrats	Nichola Harrison	1,356	40.4
Labour	Lucy Sheerman	1,052	31.3
Green	John Collins	527	15.7
Conservative	Rosemary Clarkson	426	12.7
Majority		3,304	9.0
Turnout		3,361	54.8
Registered electors		6,137	
Liberal Democrats win (new boundaries)			

Queen Edith's
Party	Candidate	Votes	%
Liberal Democrats	Geoffrey Heathcock *	2,392	59.2
Conservative	Andre Beaumont	848	21.0
Labour Co-op	Leonard Freeman	574	14.2
Green	Shayne Mitchell	225	5.6
Majority		1,544	38.2
Turnout		4,039	63.0
Registered electors		6,412	
Liberal Democrats win (new boundaries)			

Romsey
Party	Candidate	Votes	%
Liberal Democrats	Joanna Toomey	1,668	44.9
Labour Co-op	Jozef Gluza *	1,235	33.3
Green	Hamish Downer	402	10.8
Conservative	Mark Fanken-Hall	359	9.7
UKIP	Marjorie Barr	45	1.2
Majority		433	11.7
Turnout		3,709	59.1
Registered electors		6,278	
Liberal Democrats win (new boundaries)			

Trumpington
Party	Candidate	Votes	%
Liberal Democrats	Anne Kent	1,669	50.9
Conservative	John Ionides	904	27.6
Labour Co-op	George Tudor	435	13.3
Green	Ceri Galloway	266	8.1
Majority		765	23.4
Turnout		3,274	61.1
Registered electors		5,355	
Liberal Democrats win (new boundaries)			

West Chesterton
Party	Candidate	Votes	%
Liberal Democrats	Kevin Wilkins	1,869	46.7
Labour	Simon Watkins	964	24.1
Conservative	James Strachan	699	17.5
Green	Sarah Peake	468	11.7
Majority		905	22.6
Turnout		4,000	62.8
Registered electors		6,370	
Liberal Democrats win (new boundaries)			

=== East Cambridgeshire ===
==== Summary ====
East Cambridgeshire District Summary
Party	Seats	+/-	Votes	%	+/-
Liberal Democrats	6	▲3	17,466	49.97	+13.40
Conservative	3	▼1	15,584	44.58	+4.15
Labour	0	Steady	1,569	4.49	−17.15
Green	0	Steady	336	0.96	−0.40
Total	9	▲2	34,955	100.00	

==== Division results ====
Burwell
Party	Candidate	Votes	%
Liberal Democrats	Hazel Williams	2,220	55.9
Conservative	Lavinia Edwards	1,749	44.1
Majority		471	11.9
Turnout		3,969	64.4
Registered electors		6,166	
Liberal Democrats win (new boundaries)			

Ely North and East
Party	Candidate	Votes	%
Liberal Democrats	Nigel Bell	2,589	59.6
Conservative	Victoria Hearne-Casapieri *	1,754	40.4
Majority		835	19.2
Turnout		4,343	60.2
Registered electors		7,216	
Liberal Democrats win (new seat)			

Ely South and West
Party	Candidate	Votes	%
Liberal Democrats	Linda Crossley	2,123	56.2
Conservative	Andrew Mair *	1,656	43.8
Majority		467	12.4
Turnout		3,779	64.7
Registered electors		5,846	
Liberal Democrats win (new seat)			

Haddenham
Party	Candidate	Votes	%
Conservative	William Hunt	1,994	41.3
Liberal Democrats	Gareth Wilson	1,789	37.1
Labour	Michele Wilkinson	710	14.7
Green	Astra Carter-Marsh	336	6.9
Majority		205	4.2
Turnout		4,829	66.8
Registered electors		7,227	
Conservative win (new seat)			

Littleport
Party	Candidate	Votes	%
Liberal Democrats	Brenda Bean	1,599	55.2
Conservative	Frederick Brown	1,299	44.8
Majority		300	10.4
Turnout		3,779	51.9
Registered electors		5,575	
Liberal Democrats win (new boundaries)			

Soham and Fordham Villages (2)
Party	Candidate	Votes	%
Liberal Democrats	Judith Broadway	3,380	52.7
Conservative	John Powley *	3,039	47.3
Liberal Democrats	Michael Allan	2,872	
Conservative	Jacqueline Petts	2,837	
Majority		543	5.3
Majority		167	2.8
Turnout		6,064	50.6
Registered electors		11,979	
Liberal Democrats win (new seat)			
Conservative win (new seat)			

Sutton
Party	Candidate	Votes	%
Liberal Democrats	Philip Bailey	2,122	56.8
Conservative	Philip Read *	1,617	43.3
Majority		505	13.5
Turnout		3,739	63.2
Registered electors		5,920	
Liberal Democrats win (new boundaries)			

Woodditton
Party	Candidate	Votes	%
Conservative	Mathew Shuter	2,476	49.7
Liberal Democrats	Beate (Sisse) McCall	1,644	33.0
Labour	Steven O'Dell	859	17.3
Majority		832	16.7
Turnout		4,979	65.2
Registered electors		7,634	
Conservative win (new boundaries)			

=== Fenland ===
==== Summary ====
Fenland District Summary
Party	Seats	+/-	Votes	%	+/-
Conservative	11	▲2	21,232	53.03	+3.05
Liberal Democrats	0	Steady	11,060	27.62	+12.28
Labour	0	Steady	6,865	17.15	−16.82
UKIP	0	Steady	592	1.48	+1.48
Green	0	Steady	287	0.72	+0.72
Total	11	▲2	40,036	100.0	

Chatteris
Party	Candidate	Votes	%
Conservative	Alan Melton *	1,604	46.0
Liberal Democrats	David Upstone	955	27.4
Labour	Susan Coomey	926	26.6
Majority		649	18.6
Turnout		3,485	62.1
Registered electors		5,608	
Conservative win (new boundaries)			

Forty Foot
Party	Candidate	Votes	%
Conservative	Geoffrey Harper *	2,114	52.6
Labour	Grant Osbourn	1,142	28.4
Liberal Democrats	Evelyn Bradford	765	19.0
Majority		972	24.2
Turnout		4,021	62.9
Registered electors		6,385	
Conservative win (new seat)			

March East
Party	Candidate	Votes	%
Conservative	Frederick Yeulett *	1,623	44.5
Labour	Karon Webb	1,190	32.6
Liberal Democrats	Michael Pitt	551	15.1
Green	Christopher Bennett	287	7.9
Majority		433	11.9
Turnout		3,651	60.9
Registered electors		5,997	
Conservative win (new boundaries)			

March North
Party	Candidate	Votes	%
Conservative	John West	1,497	52.1
Liberal Democrats	Edna Howarth	1,378	47.9
Majority		119	4.1
Turnout		2,875	57.5
Registered electors		5,004	
Conservative win (new seat)			

March West
Party	Candidate	Votes	%
Conservative	Michael Ogden *	2,105	57.6
Liberal Democrats	Simon Rodgers	1,549	42.4
Majority		15.2	556
Turnout		3,654	61.5
Registered electors		5,940	
Conservative win (new boundaries)			

Roman Bank and Peckover
Party	Candidate	Votes	%
Conservative	Brian Hardy *	2,294	59.1
Liberal Democrats	Toby Fisher	1,591	40.9
Majority		703	18.1
Turnout		3,885	57.9
Registered electors		6,705	
Conservative win (new seat)			

Waldersey
Party	Candidate	Votes	%
Conservative	Jillian Tuck *	2,164	58.8
Liberal Democrats	Shirley Fieldhouse	1,517	41.2
Majority		647	17.6
Turnout		3,681	57.7
Registered electors		6,375	
Conservative win (new seat)			

Whittlesey North
Party	Candidate	Votes	%
Conservative	Martin Curtis	2,014	52.5
Labour	Richard Hibbert	1,341	34.9
Liberal Democrats	Malcolm Schofield	483	12.6
Majority		673	17.5
Turnout		3,838	62.7
Registered electors		6,122	
Conservative win (new seat)			

Whittlesey South
Party	Candidate	Votes	%
Conservative	Thomas Butcher	2,291	57.9
Labour	Mark Goffrey	1,082	27.3
Liberal Democrats	Thomas Yates	585	14.8
Majority		1,209	30.5
Turnout		3,958	61.6
Registered electors		6,421	
Conservative win (new seat)			

Wisbech North
Party	Candidate	Votes	%
Conservative	Leslie Sims	1,585	47.0
Labour	Kevin Goddard	1,184	35.1
Liberal Democrats	Anthony Morris	602	17.9
Majority		401	11.9
Turnout		3,371	48.2
Registered electors		6,998	
Conservative win (new seat)			

Wisbech South
Party	Candidate	Votes	%
Conservative	Simon King *	1,941	53.7
Liberal Democrats	Louis Rodrigues	1,084	29.9
UKIP	Paul Clapp	592	16.4
Majority		857	23.7
Turnout		3,617	51.0
Registered electors		7,091	
Conservative win (new seat)			

=== Huntingdonshire ===
==== Summary ====
Huntingdonshire District Summary
Party	Seats	+/-	Votes	%	+/-
Conservative	17	▲4	35,576	47.41	−2.16
Liberal Democrats	2	Steady	24,439	32.57	+1.82
Labour	0	Steady	13,029	17.36	−1.96
Independent	0	Steady	1,625	2.17	+2.17
UKIP	0	Steady	376	0.50	+0.50
Total	19	▲4	75,045	100.0	

==== Division results ====
Brampton and Kimbolton
Party	Candidate	Votes	%
Liberal Democrats	Peter Downes *	2,563	48.3
Conservative	Ian Gardner	2,285	42.1
Labour	Robert Pugh	460	8.7
Majority		278	5.2
Turnout		5,308	73.7
Registered electors		7,203	
Liberal Democrats win (new seat)			

Buckden, Gransden and The Offords
Party	Candidate	Votes	%
Conservative	Barbara Boddington	2,092	47.6
Liberal Democrats	William Clough	1,277	29.1
Independent	Alec Stenner *	579	13.2
Labour	David Nicholls	442	10.1
Majority		815	18.6
Turnout		4,390	72.1
Registered electors		6,086	
Conservative win (new seat)			

Godmanchester (2)
Party	Candidate	Votes	%
Conservative	Jeffery Dutton	3,114	45.7
Conservative	Colin Hyams	2,847	
Liberal Democrats	Peter Fleming	2,397	35.2
Liberal Democrats	Michael Shellens	2,047	
Labour	William Hennessey	1,301	19.1
Labour	David Brown	1,298	
Majority		717	10.5
Turnout		6,502	57.5
Registered electors		11,311	
Conservative win (new seat)			
Conservative win (new seat)			

Huntingdon (2)
Party	Candidate	Votes	%
Conservative	Peter Brown	2,830	47.9
Conservative	Elaine Kadic	2,352	
Liberal Democrats	Michael Burrell	1,375	23.3
Labour	Ann Beevor	1,330	22.5
Liberal Democrats	Ann Monk	1,227	
Labour	David King	1,119	
UKIP	Leonard Bruce	376	6.4
UKIP	Andrew Manning	326	
Majority		1,455	24.6
Turnout		5,468	52.1
Registered electors		10,501	
Conservative win (new seat)			
Conservative win (new seat)			

Little Paxton and St Neots North (2)
Party	Candidate	Votes	%
Conservative	David Harty	3,598	49.6
Conservative	Sharon Lee	3,342	
Liberal Democrats	Robert Eaton	2,388	32.9
Liberal Democrats	Gordon Thorpe	2,017	
Labour	Janet Boston	1,272	17.5
Labour	Patricia Nicholls	1,240	
Majority		1,210	16.7
Turnout		6,930	55.9
Registered electors		12,407	
Conservative win (new seat)			
Conservative win (new seat)			

Norman Cross (2)
Party	Candidate	Votes	%
Conservative	Lawrence McGuire *	3,454	48.0
Conservative	William Hensley *	3,108	
Labour	Margaret Cochrane	2,009	27.9
Liberal Democrats	John Davidson	1,727	24.0
Labour	Graeme Watkins	1,573	
Liberal Democrats	Janet Dutton	1,328	
Majority		1,445	20.1
Turnout		6,600	54.8
Registered electors		12,034	
Conservative win (new boundaries)			
Conservative win (new seat)			

Ramsey
Party	Candidate	Votes	%
Conservative	Susan Normington *	1,737	46.3
Liberal Democrats	Raymond Powell	1,412	37.6
Labour	Carol Harper	603	16.1
Majority		325	8.7
Turnout		3,752	58.9
Registered electors		6,373	
Conservative win (new boundaries)			

Sawtry and Ellington
Party	Candidate	Votes	%
Conservative	John Walters *	2,898	58.1
Liberal Democrats	Martin Land	1,244	24.9
Labour	Mary Howell	846	16.9
Majority		1,654	33.2
Turnout		4,988	67.9
Registered electors		7,352	
Conservative win (new seat)			

Somersham and Earith
Party	Candidate	Votes	%
Conservative	John Eddy *	2,386	49.2
Liberal Democrats	Anthony Hulme	1,814	37.4
Labour	Mark Holman	649	13.38
Majority		572	11.8
Turnout		4,849	66.5
Registered electors		7,296	
Conservative win (new seat)			

St Ives (2)
Party	Candidate	Votes	%
Conservative	Kevin Reynolds	3,747	42.3
Conservative	Dennis Pegram	3,229	
Liberal Democrats	David Hodge	2,691	30.4
Liberal Democrats	Gillian Jackson	2,471	
Labour	Richard Allen	1,368	15.5
Labour	Angela Richards	1,191	
Independent	Stuart Littlewood	1,046	11.8
Majority		1,056	11.9
Turnout		7872	55.5
Registered electors		14,194	
Conservative win (new seat)			
Conservative win (new seat)			

St Neots Eaton Socon (2)
Party	Candidate	Votes	%
Liberal Democrats	Sandra Giles *	2,405	38.7
Conservative	Rodney Farrer	2,293	36.9
Liberal Democrats	Ian Taylor	2,055	
Conservative	Paul Ursell	1,935	
Labour	Anthony Gregory	1,524	24.5
Labour	William O'Connor	1,337	
Majority		112	1.8
Turnout		5,775	50.6
Registered electors		11,412	
Liberal Democrats win (new seat)			
Conservative win (new seat)			

The Hemingfords and Fenstanton
Party	Candidate	Votes	%
Conservative	Ian Bates *	2,598	52.8
Liberal Democrats	Mark Rainer	1,657	33.7
Labour	John Watson	662	13.5
Majority		941	19.1
Turnout		4,917	69.8
Registered electors		7,042	
Conservative win (new seat)			

Warboys and Upwood
Party	Candidate	Votes	%
Conservative	Victor Lucas *	2,544	55.4
Liberal Democrats	John Souter	1,489	32.4
Labour	Steven Hicks	563	12.3
Majority		1,055	23.0
Turnout		4,596	64.6
Registered electors		7,112	
Conservative win (new seat)			

=== South Cambridgeshire ===
==== Summary ====
South Cambridgeshire District Summary
Party	Seats	+/-	Votes	%	+/-
Conservative	11	▲3	30,212	41.96	+1.97
Liberal Democrats	5	▲1	28,837	40.05	+7.49
Labour	0	▼2	7,820	10.86	−11.24
Green	0	Steady	5,134	7.13	+2.99
Total	16	▲2	72,003	100.0	

Division Results

Bar Hill
Party	Candidate	Votes	%
Conservative	John Reynolds *	2,266	45.8
Liberal Democrats	Thomas Flanagan	1,808	36.6
Labour	John Shepherd	870	17.6
Majority		458	9.3
Turnout		4,944	69.5
Registered electors		7,111	
Conservative win (new seat)			

Bassingbourn
Party	Candidate	Votes	%
Conservative	Linda Oliver *	1,981	54.4
Liberal Democrats	Ashley Woodford	982	26.9
Green	Simon Saggers	679	18.6
Majority		999	27.4
Turnout		3,642	67.3
Registered electors		5,414	
Conservative win (new seat)			

Bourn
Party	Candidate	Votes	%
Conservative	Lister Wilson *	1,125	45.3
Liberal Democrats	Jonathan Hansford	807	32.5
Labour	Mark Hurn	406	16.4
Green	Pauline Radley	143	5.8
Majority		318	12.8
Turnout		2,481	68.8
Registered electors		3,606	
Conservative win (new seat)			

Cottenham, Histon and Impington (2)
Party	Candidate	Votes	%
Conservative	Matthew Bradney	3,269	36.8
Liberal Democrats	John (David) Jenkins	3,213	36.2
Conservative	Peter Hudson	2,717	
Liberal Democrats	Linden Leeke	2,377	
Labour	Helen Wright	1,453	16.4
Labour	Aidan Hervey	1,357	
Green	Mark Claessen	949	10.7
Majority		56	0.6
Turnout		7,668	61.7
Registered electors		12,429	
Conservative win (new seat)			
Liberal Democrats win (new seat)			

Duxford
Party	Candidate	Votes	%
Liberal Democrats	Timothy Stone	2,140	43.9
Conservative	Robin Driver *	2,100	43.1
Labour	Alexandra Mayer	634	13.0
Majority		40	0.8
Turnout		4,874	72.9
Registered electors		6,690	
Liberal Democrats win (new seat)			

Fulbourn
Party	Candidate	Votes	%
Conservative	Robert Turner	2,010	43.2
Liberal Democrats	Frances Amrani	1,939	41.7
Green	Mary Lawson	705	15.2
Majority		71	1.5
Turnout		4,654	61.1
Registered electors		7,619	
Conservative win (new boundaries)			

Gamlingay
Party	Candidate	Votes	%
Liberal Democrats	Sebastian Kindersley	2,541	45.1
Conservative	Josephine Percy	2,084	36.9
Labour	Mirian Lynn	663	11.8
Green	Stephen Edmondson	347	6.2
Majority		457	8.1
Turnout		5,635	72.8
Registered electors		7,742	
Liberal Democrats win (new boundaries)			

Hardwick
Party	Candidate	Votes	%
Conservative	Denzil Baldwin	2,168	41.3
Liberal Democrats	Livia Mitson	1,855	35.4
Labour	John Kazer	786	14.9
Green	William Connolley	438	8.4
Majority		313	6.0
Turnout		5,247	71.8
Registered electors		7,304	
Conservative win (new seat)			

Linton
Party	Candidate	Votes	%
Liberal Democrats	John Batchelor	2,298	43.7
Conservative	Peter Hase	2,023	38.5
Labour	Michael Gale	696	13.2
Green	William Quinn	240	4.6
Majority		275	5.2
Turnout		5,257	72.8
Registered electors		7,222	
Liberal Democrats win (new boundaries)			

Melbourn
Party	Candidate	Votes	%
Conservative	David McCraith	2,083	42.1
Liberal Democrats	Anthony Milton *	1,854	37.4
Labour	Donald McCallum	735	14.8
Green	Sally Nichols	281	5.7
Majority		229	4.6
Turnout		4,953	70.5
Registered electors		7,031	
Conservative win (new boundaries)			

Papworth and Swavesey
Party	Candidate	Votes	%
Conservative	Mandy Smith	2,033	52.5
Liberal Democrats	Robin Martlew	1,840	47.5
Majority		193	5.0
Turnout		3,873	67.9
Registered electors		5,707	
Conservative win (new seat)			

Sawston (2)
Party	Candidate	Votes	%
Conservative	Christine Kenney	3,270	37.9
Conservative	Anthony Orgee *	3,225	
Liberal Democrats	Max Campbell	2,915	33.7
Liberal Democrats	David Ford	2,829	
Labour	Ronald Hornby	1,577	18.3
Labour	Pamela Stacey	1,521	
Green	Jacquelyn Garfit	877	10.2
Majority		355	4.1
Turnout		8,107	61.8
Registered electors		13,118	
Conservative win (new boundaries)			
Conservative win (new seat)			

Waterbeach
Party	Candidate	Votes	%
Liberal Democrats	Robert Williamson	2,820	61.2
Conservative	Gerda Covell	1,789	38.8
Majority		1,031	22.4
Turnout		4,609	63.4
Registered electors		7,276	
Liberal Democrats win (new boundaries)			

Willingham
Party	Candidate	Votes	%
Conservative	Shona Johnstone *	2,011	46.7
Liberal Democrats	Rebecca Mead	1,825	42.3
Green	Marion Barber	475	11.0
Majority		186	4.3
Turnout		4,311	65.8
Registered electors		6,552	
Conservative win (new boundaries)			
