= 2009 Cambridgeshire County Council election =

2009 UK local government election

- 4 June 2009

All 69 seats to Cambridgeshire County Council 35 seats needed for a majority

	First party	Second party	Third party
Leader	Jill Tuck	David Jenkins	Paul Sales
Party	Conservative	Liberal Democrats	Labour
Leader since	May 2008	May 2007	May 2008
Leader's seat	Waldersey		Abbey (Defeated)
Last election	42 seats, 41.0%	23 seats, 38.0%	4 seats, 15.9%
Seats before	42	23	4
Seats won	42	23	2
Seat change	Steady	Steady	▼2
Popular vote	76,075	59,268	17,372
Percentage	43.4%	33.8%	9.9%
Swing	▲2.3%	▼4.2%	▼6.0%
	Fourth party	Fifth party
Party	Green	UKIP
Last election	0 seats, 4.0%	0 seats, 0.4%
Seats before	0	0
Seats won	1	1
Seat change	▲1	▲1
Popular vote	10,351	6,780
Percentage	5.9%	3.9%
Swing	▲1.9%	▲3.5%
- Results by electoral division. Striped wards have mixed representation.
Leader before election
Jill Tuck
Conservative
Leader after election
Jill Tuck
Conservative

An election to Cambridgeshire County Council took place on 4 June 2009 as part of the 2009 United Kingdom local elections. The election was delayed from 7 May to coincide with elections to the European Parliament. 69 councillors were elected from 60 electoral divisions, which returned either one or two county councillors each by first-past-the-post voting. The Conservative Party retained their majority on the council, while the Green Party and UKIP gained their first seats.

All locally registered electors (British, Irish, Commonwealth and European Union citizens) who were aged 18 or over on Thursday 4 June 2009 were entitled to vote in the local elections. Those who were temporarily away from their ordinary address (for example, away working, on holiday, in student accommodation or in hospital) were also entitled to vote in the local elections, although those who had moved abroad and registered as overseas electors cannot vote in the local elections. It is possible to register to vote at more than one address (such as a university student who had a term-time address and lives at home during holidays) at the discretion of the local Electoral Register Office, but it remains an offence to vote more than once in the same local government election. The next election was scheduled for and held on 2 May 2013.

== Previous composition ==
=== Changes between elections ===
In between the 2005 election and the 2009 election, the following council seats changed hands:

Division	Date	Previous Party	New Party	Cause	Resulting Council Composition			
Division	Date	Previous Party	New Party	Cause	Con	LDem	Lab	Ind
Sutton	3 May 2007	Liberal Democrats	Conservative	Conservative won by-election.	43	22	4	0
Hardwick	27 November 2008	Conservative	Liberal Democrats	Liberal Democrat won by-election.	42	23	4	0

== Summary ==
In Cambridge, the Labour Party lost two seats, to the Green Party in Abbey and to the Liberal Democrats in King's Hedges. The Conservatives, despite improving their vote in many electoral divisions and coming second citywide, failed to gain any seats. South Cambridgeshire saw three seats change hands from Conservatives to Liberal Democrats, including in Hardwick which the Liberal Democrats had held since a by-election in 2008. In East Cambridgeshire however, the Conservatives gained four seats from the Liberal Democrats, with Labour fielding candidates in several electoral divisions they did not contest in 2005. There was no change in representation from Fenland, where Conservatives won every seat. In Huntingdonshire, Liberal Democrats lost a seat to Conservatives in St Neots Eaton Socon and Eynesbury, but gained one in Godmanchester and Huntingdon East, a two-member division which subsequently had split representation.

=== Election result ===
Cambridgeshire County Council election, 2009
Party	Candidates	Seats	Gains	Losses	Net gain/loss	Seats %	Votes %	Votes	+/−
Conservative	69	42	5	5	Steady	60.9	43.4	76,075	+2.3
Liberal Democrats	68	23	5	5	Steady	33.3	33.8	59,269	–4.2
Labour	69	2	0	2	▼2	2.9	9.9	17,372 (Note: Includes Labour Co-operative)	–6.0
Green	23	1	1	0	▲1	1.4	5.9	10,351	+1.9
UKIP	13	1	1	0	▲1	1.4	3.9	6,780	+3.5
Independent	8	0	0	0	Steady	0.0	2.7	4,672	+2.1
Monster Raving Loony	1	0	0	0	Steady	0.0	0.3	566	+0.3
Libertarian	1	0	0	0	Steady	0.0	0.1	140	+0.1
UK First	1	0	0	0	Steady	0.0	0.1	117	+0.1
Total	253	69						175,342	

Note: the election in Ramsey, previously held by the Conservative Party, was delayed until 23 July 2009 due to the death of one of the candidates. The election in that division was won by the United Kingdom Independence Party.

Popular vote
Conservative	43.39%
Liberal Democrats	33.80%
Labour	9.91%
Green	5.90%
UKIP	3.87%
Other	3.13%

Council seats
Conservative	60.87%
Liberal Democrats	33.33%
Labour	2.90%
Green	1.45%
UKIP	1.45%

== Party strength by electoral division ==
The following maps show the percentage of the vote each party obtained by electoral division. A colour key for each map can be viewed by clicking on the image.

Conservative Party	Liberal Democrats	Labour Party
Green Party	UKIP	

== Results by district ==
=== Cambridge ===
==== Summary ====
Cambridge District Summary
Party	Seats	+/-	Votes	%	+/-
Liberal Democrats	11	▲1	12,121	36.7	−6.5
Labour	4	▼2	6,930	21.0	−6.5
Green	1	▲1	5,159	15.6	+5.6
Conservative	0	Steady	7,153	21.7	+2.6
Independent	0	Steady	1,181	3.6	+3.6
UKIP	0	Steady	475	1.4	+1.2
Total	14	Steady	33,019	100.0	

==== Division results ====
Abbey
Party	Candidate	Votes	%	±%
Green	Simon Sedgwick-Jell	855	40.6	+28.6
Labour Co-op	Paul Sales *	617	29.3	–11.1
Conservative	Timothy Haire	362	17.2	–1.0
Liberal Democrats	Julian Huppert *	273	13.0	–16.9
Majority		238	11.3	N/a
Total valid votes		2,107	32.2	–23.2
Rejected ballots		22	1.0	
Total ballots		2,129	32.6	
Registered electors		6,534		+290
Green gain from Labour Co-op		Swing	+19.6	

Arbury
Party	Candidate	Votes	%	±%
Liberal Democrats	Rupert Moss-Eccardt *	1,146	42.0	+1.0
Labour Co-op	Ian Kidman	792	29.0	–4.7
Conservative	Daniel Whant	430	15.8	–2.3
Green	Catherine Terry	361	13.2	+6.1
Majority		354	13.0	+5.7
Total valid votes		2,729	40.6	–19.9
Rejected ballots		19	0.7	
Total ballots		2,747	40.9	
Registered electors		6,718		–70
Liberal Democrats hold		Swing	+2.8	

Castle
Party	Candidate	Votes	%	±%
Liberal Democrats	Belinda Brooks-Gordon	1,095	43.1	–9.1
Independent	John Hipkin	756	29.8	N/A
Conservative	Edward MacNaghten	267	10.5	–8.3
Green	Stephen Lawrence	226	8.9	–2.1
Labour	John Buckingham	196	7.7	–10.2
Majority		339	13.3	–20.9
Total valid votes		2,540	37.2	–25.4
Rejected ballots		13	0.5	
Total ballots		2,553	37.4	
Registered electors		6,828		+301
Liberal Democrats hold		Swing	–19.4	

Cherry Hinton
Party	Candidate	Votes	%	±%
Labour	Christine Carter *	1,021	42.2	+1.7
Conservative	Charles Harcourt	760	31.4	+5.2
Green	Neil Ford	320	13.2	+7.3
Liberal Democrats	Laurence Edkins	319	13.2	–14.2
Majority		261	10.8	–3.6
Total valid votes		2,420	38.6	–25.4
Rejected ballots		17	0.7	
Total ballots		2,437	38.9	
Registered electors		6,271		–21
Labour hold		Swing	–1.8	

Coleridge
Party	Candidate	Votes	%	±%
Labour	Tariq Sadiq	929	36.3	+0.4
Conservative	Andrew Bower	830	32.5	+11.9
Liberal Democrats	Thomas Yates	325	12.7	–21.7
Green	Valerie Hopkins	314	12.2	+5.4
UKIP	Albert Watts	159	6.2	+4.0
Majority		99	3.9	+2.4
Total valid votes		2,557	40.9	–19.0
Rejected ballots		14	0.5	
Total ballots		2,571	41.2	
Registered electors		6,250		+421
Labour hold		Swing	–5.7	

East Chesterton
Party	Candidate	Votes	%	±%
Liberal Democrats	Siep Wijsenbeek	807	35.8	–3.4
Conservative	James Strachan	559	24.8	+5.5
Labour	Leonard Freeman	339	15.0	–18.0
Green	Peter Pope	331	14.7	+6.2
UKIP	Peter Burkinshaw	220	9.8	N/A
Majority		248	11.0	+4.8
Total valid votes		2,256	35.9	–25.0
Rejected ballots		18	0.8	
Total ballots		2,273	36.1	
Registered electors		6,290		+374
Liberal Democrats hold		Swing	–4.5	

King's Hedges
Party	Candidate	Votes	%	±%
Liberal Democrats	Andrew Pellew	751	39.2	+5.2
Labour	Primrose Hughes *	500	26.1	–10.8
Conservative	Matthew Adams	439	22.9	+1.0
Green	James Youd	228	11.9	+4.6
Majority		251	13.1	+10.1
Total valid votes		1,918	32.7	–22.6
Rejected ballots		22	0.9	
Total ballots		1,940	33.0	
Registered electors		5,873		–154
Liberal Democrats gain from Labour		Swing	+8.0	

Market
Party	Candidate	Votes	%	±%
Liberal Democrats	Sarah Whitebread	847	44.7	–5.4
Conservative	Sheila Lawlor	406	21.4	+3.7
Green	Keith Garrett	401	21.2	+5.4
Labour	George Owers	239	12.6	–3.7
Majority		441	23.3	–9.1
Total valid votes		1,893	27.2	–30.2
Rejected ballots		9	0.5	
Total ballots		1,902	27.4	
Registered electors		6,949		+435
Liberal Democrats hold		Swing	–4.5	

Newnham
Party	Candidate	Votes	%	±%
Liberal Democrats	Lucy Nethsingha	1,051	46.3	–4.4
Conservative	James Sharpe	503	22.2	+4.2
Green	Robert Young	393	17.3	+3.2
Labour	Malcolm Schofield	323	14.2	–3.0
Majority		548	24.1	–8.5
Total valid votes		2,270	34.1	–28.0
Rejected ballots		15	0.6	
Total ballots		2,285	34.3	
Registered electors		6,658		+371
Liberal Democrats hold		Swing	–4.3	

Petersfield
Party	Candidate	Votes	%	±%
Liberal Democrats	Nichola Harrison *	1,009	41.8	+1.4
Labour	Jennifer May	718	29.7	–1.6
Green	Shayne Mitchell	353	14.6	–1.1
Conservative	Shapour Meftah	335	13.9	+1.2
Majority		291	12.1	+3.0
Total valid votes		2,415	38.3	–16.5
Rejected ballots		10	0.4	
Total ballots		2,425	38.5	
Registered electors		6,306		+169
Liberal Democrats hold		Swing	+1.5	

Queen Edith's
Party	Candidate	Votes	%	±%
Liberal Democrats	Geoffrey Heathcock *	1,521	56.3	–2.9
Conservative	Donald Douglas	651	24.1	+3.1
Green	Brian Westcott	329	12.2	+6.6
Labour	Jonathan Goodacre	199	7.4	–6.8
Majority		870	32.2	–6.0
Total valid votes		2,700	42.4	–20.6
Rejected ballots		7	0.3	
Total ballots		2,707	42.5	
Registered electors		6,367		–45
Liberal Democrats hold		Swing	–3.0	

Romsey
Party	Candidate	Votes	%	±%
Liberal Democrats	Kilian Bourke *	829	34.4	–10.6
Labour	Christine Freeman	493	20.5	–12.8
Independent	Thomas Woodcock	425	17.6	N/A
Green	Philip Richards	297	12.3	+1.5
Conservative	Samuel Barker	270	11.2	+1.5
UKIP	Marjorie Barr	96	4.0	+2.8
Majority		336	13.9	+2.3
Total valid votes		2,410	36.8	–22.3
Rejected ballots		9	0.4	
Total ballots		2,419	36.9	
Registered electors		6,557		+279
Liberal Democrats hold		Swing	+1.1	

Trumpington
Party	Candidate	Votes	%	±%
Liberal Democrats	Caroline Shepherd	991	43.6	–7.4
Conservative	John Ionides	819	36.0	+8.4
Green	Ceri Galloway	292	12.9	+4.7
Labour	Pamela Stacey	170	7.5	–5.8
Majority		172	7.6	–15.8
Total valid votes		2,272	39.4	–21.8
Rejected ballots		20	0.9	
Total ballots		2,292	39.7	
Registered electors		5,769		+414
Liberal Democrats hold		Swing	–7.9	

West Chesterton
Party	Candidate	Votes	%	±%
Liberal Democrats	Kevin Wilkins *	1,157	45.5	–1.0
Conservative	Michael Morley	522	20.5	+3.1
Green	Alexandra Collis	459	18.1	+6.4
Labour	Michael Sargeant	394	15.5	–8.5
Majority		635	25.1	+2.5
Total valid votes		2,532	41.0	–21.8
Rejected ballots		10	0.4	
Total ballots		2,542	41.2	
Registered electors		6,176		–194
Liberal Democrats hold		Swing	–2.1	

=== East Cambridgeshire ===
==== Summary ====
East Cambridgeshire District Summary
Party	Seats	+/-	Votes	%	+/-
Conservative	7	▲4	11,632	50.38	+5.80
Liberal Democrats	2	▼4	9,380	40.63	−9.34
Labour	0	Steady	1,490	6.45	+1.97
Independent	0	Steady	584	2.53	+2.53
Total	9	Steady	23,086	100.00	

==== Division results ====
Burwell
Party	Candidate	Votes	%	±%
Conservative	David Brown	1,321	47.6	+3.5
Liberal Democrats	Hazel Williams *	1,290	46.5	–9.5
Labour	Sandra Wilson	165	5.9	N/A
Majority		31	1.1	N/A
Total valid votes		2,776	44.1	–20.2
Rejected ballots		32	1.1	
Total ballots		2,808	44.7	
Registered electors		6,289		+123
Conservative gain from Liberal Democrats		Swing	+6.5	

Ely North and East
Party	Candidate	Votes	%	±%
Liberal Democrats	Nigel Bell *	1,414	47.1	–12.5
Conservative	David Ambrose-Smith	1,355	45.1	+4.7
Labour	Robin Hay	233	7.8	N/A
Majority		59	2.0	–17.3
Total valid votes		3,002	37.5	–22.7
Rejected ballots		45	1.4	
Total ballots		3,047	38.0	
Registered electors		8,015		+799
Liberal Democrats hold		Swing	–8.6	

Ely South and West
Party	Candidate	Votes	%	±%
Liberal Democrats	Sue Austen	1,374	52.0	–4.2
Conservative	Anna Bailey	1,115	44.2	–1.6
Labour	Michele Wilkinson	153	5.8	N/A
Majority		259	9.8	–2.6
Total valid votes		2,642	41.9	–22.8
Rejected ballots		46	1.5	
Total ballots		2,688	42.6	
Registered electors		6,308		+462
Liberal Democrats hold		Swing	–1.3	

Haddenham
Party	Candidate	Votes	%	±%
Conservative	Bill Hunt *	1,642	51.3	+10.0
Liberal Democrats	Gareth Wilson	1,427	44.6	+7.5
Labour	Christopher Wilson	131	4.1	–10.6
Majority		215	6.7	+2.5
Total valid votes		3,200	46.6	–24.3
Rejected ballots		33	1.0	
Total ballots		3,233	43.0	
Registered electors		7,520		+293
Conservative hold		Swing	+1.2	

Littleport
Party	Candidate	Votes	%	±%
Conservative	Fred Brown	926	53.4	+8.6
Liberal Democrats	Aaron Broadley	647	37.3	–17.9
Labour	Edna Simms	134	7.7	N/A
Majority		279	16.3	+5.9
Total valid votes		1,707	28.2	–23.7
Rejected ballots		27	1.6	
Total ballots		1,734	28.7	
Registered electors		6,044		+469
Conservative gain from Liberal Democrats		Swing	+3.0	

Soham and Fordham Villages
Party	Candidate	Votes	%	±%
Conservative	James Palmer	2,331	58.9	+11.5
Conservative	John Powley *	1,919		
Liberal Democrats	Charles Warner	1,347	34.0	–18.6
Liberal Democrats	Michael Allan	1,238		
Labour	Jessica Blair	280	7.1	N/A
Labour	Kerry Murphy	257		
Majority		984	24.9	N/A
Total valid votes		3,970	31.3	–19.3
Rejected ballots		77	1.9	
Total ballots		4,047	31.9	
Registered electors		12,667		+688
Conservative gain from Liberal Democrats		Swing	+15.1	
Conservative hold		Swing		

Sutton
Party	Candidate	Votes	%	±%
Conservative	Philip Read *	1,131	45.5	+2.2
Liberal Democrats	Ian Dewar	593	23.9	–32.9
Independent	Owen Winters	584	23.5	N/A
Labour	Peter Allenson	178	7.2	N/A
Majority		538	21.6	N/A
Total valid votes		2,486	38.7	–24.4
Rejected ballots		12	0.5	
Total ballots		2,498	38.9	
Registered electors		6,421		+501
Conservative gain from Liberal Democrats		Swing	+17.6	

Woodditton
Party	Candidate	Votes	%	±%
Conservative	Mathew Shuter *	1,811	56.6	+4.9
Liberal Democrats	Christine Bryant	1,288	38.9	+5.8
Labour	Steven O'Dell	216	6.5	–10.7
Majority		523	15.8	–0.9
Total valid votes		3,315	42.9	–22.3
Rejected ballots		44	1.3	
Total ballots		3,359	43.5	
Registered electors		7,729		+95
Conservative hold		Swing	–0.5	

=== Fenland ===
==== Summary ====
Fenland District Summary
Party	Seats	+/-	Votes	%	+/-
Conservative	11	Steady	12,268	51.53	−1.50
Liberal Democrats	0	Steady	4,738	19.90	−7.72
Labour	0	Steady	2,560	10.75	−6.39
UKIP	0	Steady	2,066	8.68	+7.20
Independent	0	Steady	1,721	7.23	+7.23
Green	0	Steady	197	0.83	+0.11
Libertarian	0	Steady	140	0.59	+0.59
UK First	0	Steady	117	0.49	+0.49
Total	11	Steady	23,807	100.00	

==== Division results ====
Chatteris
Party	Candidate	Votes	%	±%
Conservative	Alan Melton	1,140	50.2	+4.2
Liberal Democrats	Chris Howes	975	42.9	+15.5
Labour	Max Kelly	157	6.9	–19.7
Majority		165	7.3	–11.4
Total valid votes		2,272	38.5	–23.6
Rejected ballots		40	1.7	
Total ballots		2,312	39.2	
Registered electors		5,895		+287
Conservative hold		Swing	–5.7	

Forty Foot
Party	Candidate	Votes	%	±%
Conservative	Geoffrey Harper	981	38.4	–14.2
Independent	Mark Archer	767	30.0	N/A
UKIP	Callum Duffy	380	14.9	N/A
Liberal Democrats	Roy Benford	167	6.5	–12.5
Labour	Bill Ashby	123	4.8	–23.6
UK First	Len Baynes	117	4.6	N/A
Majority				
Total valid votes				
Rejected ballots		24	0.9	
Total ballots		2,556	36.8	
Registered electors				
Conservative hold		Swing		

March East
Party	Candidate	Votes	%	±%
Conservative	Fred Yeulett	1,229	57.6	+13.1
Liberal Democrats	Heather Kinnear	497	23.3	+8.2
Labour	Carol Jones	372	17.4	–15.2
Majority				
Total valid votes				
Rejected ballots		37	1.7	
Total ballots		2,135	33.9	
Registered electors				
Conservative hold		Swing		

March North
Party	Candidate	Votes	%	±%
Conservative	John West	985	54.9	+2.8
Liberal Democrats	Christine Colbert	538	29.9	–17.9
Labour	Harry Jones	242	13.5	N/A
Majority				
Total valid votes				
Rejected ballots		31	1.7	
Total ballots		1,794	33.6	
Registered electors				
Conservative hold		Swing		

March West
Party	Candidate	Votes	%	±%
Conservative	John Clark	1,175	53.3	–4.3
Independent	Reg Kemp	560	25.4	N/A
Liberal Democrats	Paul Adams	277	12.6	–29.8
Labour	Joy Owen	177	8.0	N/A
Majority				
Total valid votes				
Rejected ballots		14	0.6	
Total ballots		2,203	35.9	
Registered electors				
Conservative hold		Swing		

Roman Bank and Peckover
Party	Candidate	Votes	%	±%
Conservative	Steve Tierney	1,326	52.7	–6.3
UKIP	Christopher Schooling	617	24.5	N/A
Labour	Joan Diggle	306	12.2	N/A
Liberal Democrats	Frank Bellard	254	10.1	–30.9
Majority				
Total valid votes				
Rejected ballots		12	0.5	
Total ballots		2,516	36.9	
Registered electors				
Conservative hold		Swing		

Waldersey
Party	Candidate	Votes	%	±%
Conservative	Jill Tuck	936	40.2	–18.6
Liberal Democrats	Gavin Booth	641	27.4	–13.7
Independent	Alan Burbridge	394	16.9	N/A
Green	Paul Carpenter	197	8.5	N/A
Labour	Dave Goode	146	6.3	N/A
Majority				
Total valid votes				
Rejected ballots		15	0.6	
Total ballots		2,331	38.1	
Registered electors				
Conservative hold		Swing		

Whittlesey North
Party	Candidate	Votes	%	±%
Conservative	Martin Curtis	1,393	61.3	+8.9
Liberal Democrats	David Chapman	499	21.9	+9.4
Labour	Jes Hibbert	343	15.1	–19.8
Majority				
Total valid votes				
Rejected ballots		32	1.4	
Total ballots		2,271	37.7	
Registered electors				
Conservative hold		Swing		

Whittlesey South
Party	Candidate	Votes	%	±%
Conservative	Ralph Butcher	1,444	66.1	+8.3
Liberal Democrats	Peter Ward	487	22.3	+7.5
Labour	Aiden Hervey	211	9.7	–17.7
Majority				
Total valid votes				
Rejected ballots		44	2.0	
Total ballots		2,183	38.5	
Registered electors				
Conservative hold		Swing		

Wisbech North
Party	Candidate	Votes	%	±%
Conservative	Les Sims	729	41.3	–5.7
UKIP	Paul Clapp	537	30.4	N/A
Labour	Barry Diggle	271	15.4	–19.8
Liberal Democrats	Diane Baldry	212	12.0	–5.8
Majority				
Total valid votes				
Rejected ballots		12	0.7	
Total ballots		1,764	23.9	
Registered electors				
Conservative hold		Swing		

Wisbech South
Party	Candidate	Votes	%	±%
Conservative	Simon King	930	46.3	–7.4
UKIP	William Schooling	532	26.5	+10.1
Labour	Mark Plumb	212	10.5	N/A
Liberal Democrats	Verity Roscoe	191	9.5	–20.5
Libertarian	Andrew Hunt	140	6.9	N/A
Majority				
Total valid votes				
Rejected ballots		6	0.3	
Total ballots		2,010	31.1	
Registered electors				
Conservative hold		Swing		

=== Huntingdonshire ===
==== Summary ====
Huntingdonshire District Summary
Party	Seats	+/-	Votes	%	+/-
Conservative	16	▼1	23,948	51.0	+3.6
Liberal Democrats	2	Steady	14,146	30.1	−2.5
UKIP	1	▲1	3,899	8.3	+7.8
Labour	0	Steady	2,984	6.4	−11.0
Green	0	Steady	1,440	3.1	+3.1
Monster Raving Loony	0	Steady	566	1.2	+1.2
Total	19	Steady	46,983	100.0	

==== Division results ====
Brampton and Kimbolton
Party	Candidate	Votes	%	±%
Liberal Democrats	Peter Downes	2,207	58.8	+10.5
Conservative	Philip Norton	1,418	37.8	–5.3
Labour	Marion Kadewere	83	2.2	–6.5
Majority				
Total valid votes				
Rejected ballots		43	1.1	
Total ballots		3,756	51.5	
Registered electors				
Liberal Democrats hold		Swing		

Buckden, Gransden and The Offords
Party	Candidate	Votes	%	±%
Conservative	Richard West	1,657	55.9	+8.3
Liberal Democrats	William Clough	1,162	39.3	+10.2
Labour	Sybil Tuckwood	117	3.9	–6.1
Majority				
Total valid votes				
Rejected ballots		23	0.8	
Total ballots		2,959	47.9	
Registered electors				
Conservative hold		Swing		

Godmanchester and Huntingdon East
Party	Candidate	Votes	%	±%
Liberal Democrats	Graham Wilson	2,232	23.9	+5.4
Conservative	Jeffery Dutton	2,223	23.8	–0.2
Conservative	Colin Hyams	2,197	23.4	+1.6
Liberal Democrats	Michael Shellens	2,105	22.5	+6.8
Labour	Ruth Pugh	327	3.5	–6.5
Labour	Patrick Kadewere	272	2.9	–7.1
Majority				
Total valid votes				
Rejected ballots		59	1.2	
Total ballots		4,920	43.1	
Registered electors				
Liberal Democrats gain from Conservative		Swing		
Conservative hold		Swing		

Huntingdon
Party	Candidate	Votes	%	±%
Conservative	Peter Brown	1,922	28.6	+2.8
Conservative	Elaine Kadic	1,572	23.4	+1.9
Liberal Democrats	Michael Burrell	908	13.5	+0.9
Liberal Democrats	John Morgan	835	12.4	+1.2
Green	John Clare	606	9.0	N/A
Labour	Ann Beevor	466	6.9	–5.2
Labour	David King	400	5.9	–4.3
Majority				
Total valid votes				
Rejected ballots		39	1.0	
Total ballots		3,712	33.3	
Registered electors				
Conservative hold		Swing		
Conservative hold		Swing		

Little Paxton and St Neots North
Party	Candidate	Votes	%	±%
Conservative	Kenneth Churchill *	2,573	29.8	+5.7
Conservative	David Harty	2,451	28.4	+2.4
Liberal Democrats	Robert Eaton	1,228	14.2	–3.0
Liberal Democrats	Gordon Thorpe	1,052	12.2	–2.3
Green	Sarah Boulton	834	9.7	N/A
Labour	Graham Hitchings	280	3.2	–5.9
Labour	John Watson	217	2.5	–6.4
Majority				
Total valid votes				
Rejected ballots		45	0.9	
Total ballots		4,751	38.3	
Registered electors				
Conservative hold		Swing		
Conservative hold		Swing		

Norman Cross (2)
Party	Candidate	Votes	%	±%
Conservative	Nicholas Guyatt	2,159	29.1	+5.5
Conservative	Lawrence McGuire	2,068	27.8	+1.7
UKIP	Gary Shaw	1,135	15.3	N/A
Liberal Democrats	Michael Black	679	9.1	–3.9
Liberal Democrats	Patricia Shrapnel	612	8.2	–1.8
Labour	Graeme Watkins	419	5.6	–6.3
Labour	Chris Gudgin	359	4.8	–10.4
Majority				
Total valid votes				
Rejected ballots		27	0.6	
Total ballots		4,178	33.8	
Registered electors				
Conservative hold		Swing		
Conservative hold		Swing		

Ramsey
Party	Candidate	Votes	%	±%
UKIP	Peter Reeve	865	44.8	N/A
Conservative	Susan Normington	682	35.4	–10.9
Liberal Democrats	Anthony Hulme	308	15.9	–21.7
Labour	Susan Coomey	53	2.7	–13.3
Majority				
Total valid votes				
Rejected ballots		21	1.1	
Total ballots		1,929	30.2	
Registered electors				
UKIP gain from Conservative		Swing		

Sawtry and Ellington
Party	Candidate	Votes	%	±%
Conservative	Vivienne McGuire	1,735	55.4	–2.7
UKIP	Dilys Marvin	621	19.8	N/A
Liberal Democrats	David Cutter	586	18.7	–6.2
Labour	Kevin Goddard	171	5.5	–11.5
Majority				
Total valid votes				
Rejected ballots		17	0.5	
Total ballots		3,130	42.9	
Registered electors				
Conservative hold		Swing		

Somersham and Earith
Party	Candidate	Votes	%	±%
Conservative	Stephen Criswell *	1,974	62.6	+13.4
Liberal Democrats	Leona Graham-Elen	540	17.1	–20.3
UKIP	Michael Horwood	475	15.1	N/A
Labour	Mary Howell	139	4.4	–8.9
Majority				
Total valid votes				
Rejected ballots		24	0.8	
Total ballots		3,153	43.2	
Registered electors				
Conservative hold		Swing		

St Ives (2)
Party	Candidate	Votes	%	±%
Conservative	Kevin Reynolds	2,553	28.1	+4.3
Conservative	Dennis Pegram	2,307	25.4	+4.9
Liberal Democrats	David Hodge	1,543	16.9	–0.1
Liberal Democrats	Robin Waters	1,412	15.5	–0.2
Monster Raving Loony	Lord Toby Jug	566	6.2	N/A
Labour	Richard Allen	362	3.9	–4.7
Labour	Angela Richards	343	3.8	–3.8
Majority				
Total valid votes				
Rejected ballots		42	0.8	
Total ballots		4,976	34.9	
Registered electors				
Conservative hold		Swing		
Conservative hold		Swing		

St Neots Eaton Socon and Eynesbury
Party	Candidate	Votes	%	±%
Conservative	Rodney Farrer	1,699	25.6	+5.7
Conservative	Catherine Hodgson Hutton	1,642	24.7	+7.9
Liberal Democrats	Julia Hayward	1,443	21.7	+0.9
Liberal Democrats	Martin Land	1,305	19.7	+1.9
Labour	Christine Ellarby	275	4.1	–9.1
Labour	William O'Connor	273	4.1	–7.5
Majority				
Total valid votes				
Rejected ballots		77	2.1	
Total ballots		3,675	31.2	
Registered electors				
Conservative hold		Swing		
Conservative gain from Liberal Democrats		Swing		

The Hemingfords and Fenstanton
Party	Candidate	Votes	%	±%
Conservative	Ian Bates	1,945	65.1	+12.3
Liberal Democrats	Colin Saunderson	806	26.9	–6.7
Labour	Carole Hitchings	194	6.5	–6.9
Majority				
Total valid votes				
Rejected ballots		37	1.2	
Total ballots		2,987	42.2	
Registered electors				
Conservative hold		Swing		

Warboys and Upwood
Party	Candidate	Votes	%	±%
Conservative	Victor Lucas	1,408	49.8	–5.5
UKIP	Robert Brown	803	28.4	N/A
Liberal Democrats	Robert Johnson	504	17.8	–14.6
Labour	Margaret Cochrane	98	3.5	–8.8
Majority				
Total valid votes				
Rejected ballots		10	0.4	
Total ballots		2,826	39.0	
Registered electors				
Conservative hold		Swing		

=== South Cambridgeshire ===
==== Summary ====
South Cambridgeshire District Summary
Party	Seats	+/-	Votes	%	+/-
Conservative	8	▼3	21,074	43.5	+1.5
Liberal Democrats	8	▲3	18,884	39.0	−1.1
Green	0	Steady	3,555	7.3	+0.2
Labour	0	Steady	3,408	7.0	−3.8
Independent	0	Steady	1,186	2.4	+2.4
UKIP	0	Steady	340	0.7	+0.7
Total	16	Steady	48,447	100.0	

==== Division results ====
Bar Hill
Party	Candidate	Votes	%	±%
Conservative	John Reynolds	1,866	55.4	+9.5
Liberal Democrats	Brian Bromwich	540	16.0	–20.5
UKIP	Helen Davies-Green	340	10.1	N/A
Green	Teal Riley	320	9.5	N/A
Labour	Christopher Jones	284	8.4	–9.2
Majority				
Total valid votes				
Rejected ballots		17	0.5	
Total ballots		3,370	46.3	
Registered electors				
Conservative hold		Swing		

Bassingbourn
Party	Candidate	Votes	%	±%
Conservative	Linda Oliver	1,363	57.3	+2.9
Green	Simon Saggers	523	22.0	+3.4
Liberal Democrats	Ashley Woodford	262	11.0	–15.9
Labour	Gabriele Falcini	203	8.5	N/A
Majority				
Total valid votes				
Rejected ballots		19	0.8	
Total ballots		2,377	44.5	
Registered electors				
Conservative hold		Swing		

Bourn
Party	Candidate	Votes	%	±%
Conservative	Lister Wilson	897	48.7	+3.4
Liberal Democrats	Jon Hansford	672	36.5	+3.9
Labour	Mark Hurn	251	13.6	–2.7
Majority				
Total valid votes				
Rejected ballots		23	1.2	
Total ballots		1,842	35.6	
Registered electors				
Conservative hold		Swing		

Cottenham, Histon and Impington
Party	Candidate	Votes	%	±%
Liberal Democrats	David Jenkins	2,419	23.7	+2.8
Liberal Democrats	Susan Gymer	2,202	21.6	+6.1
Conservative	Matthew Bradney	2,168	21.2	–0.1
Conservative	Simon Edwards	2,074	20.3	+2.6
Green	Jenny Butler	698	6.8	+0.6
Labour	Val Ross	363	3.6	–5.9
Labour	Niamh Sweeney	281	2.8	–6.1
Majority				
Total valid votes				
Rejected ballots		32	0.6	
Total ballots		5,516	42.8	
Registered electors				
Liberal Democrats gain from Conservative		Swing		
Liberal Democrats hold		Swing		

Duxford
Party	Candidate	Votes	%	±%
Liberal Democrats	Timothy Stone	1,735	51.2	+7.3
Conservative	James Hoskins	1,195	35.3	–7.8
Independent	James Quinlan	280	8.3	N/A
Labour	Lucy Howson	150	4.4	–8.6
Majority				
Total valid votes				
Rejected ballots		24	0.7	
Total ballots		3,388	49.9	
Registered electors				
Liberal Democrats hold		Swing		

Fulbourn
Party	Candidate	Votes	%	±%
Conservative	Nick Clarke	1,064	35.4	–7.8
Independent	Neil Scarr	906	30.1	N/A
Liberal Democrats	John Williams	785	26.1	–15.5
Labour	Josephine Teague	235	7.8	N/A
Majority				
Total valid votes				
Rejected ballots		16	0.5	
Total ballots		3,005	40.1	
Registered electors				
Conservative hold		Swing		

Gamlingay
Party	Candidate	Votes	%	±%
Liberal Democrats	Sebastian Kindersley	2,089	56.8	+11.7
Conservative	Helen Rees	1,351	36.7	–0.2
Labour	Valerie Brooker	192	5.2	–6.5
Majority				
Total valid votes				
Rejected ballots		47	1.3	
Total ballots		3,678	47.3	
Registered electors				
Liberal Democrats hold		Swing		

Hardwick
Party	Candidate	Votes	%	±%
Liberal Democrats	Fiona Whelan *	1,881	54.1	+18.8
Conservative	Bill Hensley	1,091	31.4	–9.9
Green	William Connolley	323	9.3	+0.9
Labour	John Shepherd	158	4.5	–10.4
Majority				
Total valid votes				
Rejected ballots		22	0.6	
Total ballots		3,476	46.4	
Registered electors				
Liberal Democrats gain from Conservative		Swing		

Linton
Party	Candidate	Votes	%	±%
Liberal Democrats	John Batchelor	1,812	47.9	+4.2
Conservative	Roger Hickford	1,737	45.9	+7.4
Labour	Shannon Revel	195	5.2	–8.1
Majority				
Total valid votes				
Rejected ballots		39	1.0	
Total ballots		3,782	52.9	
Registered electors				
Liberal Democrats hold		Swing		

Melbourn
Party	Candidate	Votes	%	±%
Liberal Democrats	Susan Van de Ven	1,717	49.6	+12.2
Conservative	David McCraith	1,347	38.9	–3.2
Green	Sam Morris	227	6.6	+0.9
Labour	Hywel Jackson	155	4.5	–10.4
Majority				
Total valid votes				
Rejected ballots		16	0.5	
Total ballots		3,462	48.9	
Registered electors				
Liberal Democrats gain from Conservative		Swing		

Papworth and Swavesey
Party	Candidate	Votes	%	±%
Conservative	Mandy Smith	1,601	63.4	+10.9
Liberal Democrats	Peter Fane	684	27.1	–20.4
Labour	Mumtaz Khan	213	8.4	N/A
Majority				
Total valid votes				
Rejected ballots		28	1.1	
Total ballots		2,526	43.6	
Registered electors				
Conservative hold		Swing		

Sawston (2)
Party	Candidate	Votes	%	±%
Conservative	Tony Orgee	2,584	27.3	+7.4
Conservative	Gail Kenney	2,501	26.4	+6.3
Liberal Democrats	Michael Kilpatrick	1,782	18.8	+0.9
Green	Linda Whitebread	1,464	15.5	+10.1
Labour	Mike Nettleton	672	7.1	–2.6
Labour	Marie Baker	459	4.9	–4.5
Majority				
Total valid votes				
Rejected ballots		27	0.5	
Total ballots		5,355	41.79	
Registered electors				
Conservative hold		Swing		
Conservative hold		Swing		

Waterbeach
Party	Candidate	Votes	%	±%
Liberal Democrats	Michael Williamson	1,618	51.9	–9.2
Conservative	Peter Johnson	1,325	42.5	+3.7
Labour	Godson Lawal	152	4.9	N/A
Majority				
Total valid votes				
Rejected ballots		35	1.1	
Total ballots		3,114	44.7	
Registered electors				
Liberal Democrats hold		Swing		

Willingham
Party	Candidate	Votes	%	±%
Conservative	Shona Johnstone *	1,485	56.5	+9.9
Liberal Democrats	Rob Falla	888	33.8	–8.5
Labour	Charlie Wilson	185	7.0	N/A
Majority				
Total valid votes				
Rejected ballots		52	1.9	
Total ballots		2,627	37.1	
Registered electors				
Conservative hold		Swing		
