= 2001 Cambridgeshire County Council election =

2001 UK local government election

- 5 May 2001

All 59 seats to Cambridgeshire County Council 30 seats needed for a majority
- Turnout: 61.2

	First party	Second party	Third party
Leader	Keith Walters	Sal Brinton	Janet Jones
Party	Conservative	Liberal Democrats	Labour
Leader since	13 May 1997	7 May 1997	Before May 1977
Leader's seat	Sawtry	Castle	King's Hedges
Last election	33 seats, 39.8%	16 seats, 31.9%	10 seats, 25.9%
Seats before	34	16	9
Seats won	34	16	9
Seat change	▲1	Steady	▼1
Popular vote	104,630	81,070	65,724
Percentage	40.5%	31.5%	25.5%
Swing	▼0.7%	▼0.5%	▲0.3%
Leader before election
Keith Walters
Conservative
Leader after election
Keith Walters
Conservative

The 2001 Cambridgeshire County Council election took place on 3 May 2001 to elect members of Cambridgeshire County Council as part of the 2001 United Kingdom local elections.

The previous election was the 1997 Cambridgeshire County Council election. All 59 councillors were elected from electoral divisions, which returned either one or two county councillors each by first-past-the-post voting.

== Previous composition ==
=== 1997 election ===
Party	Seats
Conservative	33
Liberal Democrats	16
Labour	10
Total	59

=== Composition of council seats before election ===
Party	Seats
Conservative	34
Liberal Democrats	16
Labour	9
Total	59

=== Changes between elections ===
In between the 1997 election and the 2001 election, the following council seats changed hands:

Division	Date	Previous Party	New Party	Cause	Resulting Council Composition			
Division	Date	Previous Party	New Party	Cause	Con	LDem	Lab	Ind
Coleridge	5 April 2001	Labour	Conservative	Councillor quit party to sit as a Conservative.	34	16	9	0

== Summary ==
=== Election result ===
Cambridgeshire County Council election, 2001
Party	Candidates	Seats	Gains	Losses	Net gain/loss	Seats %	Votes %	Votes	+/−
Conservative	59	34	4	3	▲1	57.6	40.6	104,630	+0.7
Liberal Democrats	59	16	4	4	Steady	27.1	31.5	81,070	–0.3
Labour	59	9	1	2	▼1	15.3	25.5	65,724	–0.3
Green	18	0	Steady	Steady	Steady	0.0	2.0	5,051	+1.6
Independent	3	0	Steady	Steady	Steady	0.0	0.3	729	–1.3
UKIP	1	0	Steady	Steady	Steady	0.0	0.2	490	+0.2
Total	199	59						257,694	

Popular vote
Conservative	40.60%
Liberal Democrats	31.46%
Labour	25.50%
Other	2.43%

Council seats
Conservative	57.63%
Liberal Democrats	27.12%
Labour	15.25%

=== Election of Group Leaders ===
John Walters (Sawtry) was re-elected leader of the Conservative Group with John Reynolds (Girton) re-elected as the deputy leader, Sal Brinton (Castle) was re-elected leader of the Lib Dem Group with former leader Maurice Leeke (West Chesterton) as the deputy leader, and Janet Jones (King's Hedges) was re-elected leader of the Labour Group with Ian Kidman (Arbury) again as the deputy leader.

Jones would stand down as leader in May 2004 and was replaced by Kidman. Brinton would stand down as leader in October 2004 to be replaced with new deputy Julian Huppert (East Chesterton).

== Government Formation ==
John Walters the leader of the conservative group was duly elected leader of the council and formed a conservative administration.

== Aftermath ==
New electoral division boundaries were brought in for the next elections, increasing the number of seats to 69 at the 2005 Cambridgeshire County Council election.

== Results by district ==
=== Cambridge ===
==== Summary ====
Cambridge District Summary
Party	Seats	+/-	Votes	%	+/-
Liberal Democrats	7	▲1	20,306	39.6	+2.5
Labour	7	▼1	17,753	34.6	–2.8
Conservative	0	Steady	11,465	22.4	–2.6
Green	0	Steady	1,614	3.1	+2.6
Independent	0	Steady	156	0.3	+0.3
Total	14	Steady	51,294	100.0	

==== Division results ====
Abbey
Party	Candidate	Votes	%	±%
Labour	Colin Shaw *	1,396	56.7	
Conservative	Simon Mitton	540	21.9	
Liberal Democrats	Kirsten Proctor	414	16.8	
Green	Stephen Lawrence	113	4.6	
Majority		856	34.8	
Turnout		2,463	52.0	
Registered electors		4,737		
Labour hold		Swing		

Arbury
Party	Candidate	Votes	%	±%
Labour	Ian Kidman *	1,389	45.7	
Liberal Democrats	Rupert Moss-Eccardt	857	28.2	
Conservative	Robert Boorman	796	26.2	
Majority		532	17.5	
Turnout		3,042	60.0	
Registered electors		5,073		
Labour hold		Swing		

Castle
Party	Candidate	Votes	%	±%
Liberal Democrats	Sal Brinton *	2,377	57.3	
Labour	Gillian Richardson	965	23.3	
Conservative	Charles Harcourt	805	19.4	
Majority		1,412	34.1	
Turnout		4,147	58.4	
Registered electors		7,105		
Liberal Democrats hold		Swing		

Cherry Hinton
Party	Candidate	Votes	%	±%
Labour	Christine Carter	1,665	46.6	
Conservative	Graham Palmer	1,380	38.6	
Liberal Democrats	Frances Amanri	532	14.9	
Majority		285	8.0	
Turnout		3,577	66.3	
Registered electors		5,399		
Labour hold		Swing		

Coleridge
Party	Candidate	Votes	%	±%
Labour	Charles Ballard	1,832	49.7	
Conservative	Josephine Percy *	1,064	28.9	
Liberal Democrats	Laurence Elkins	790	21.4	
Majority		768	20.8	
Turnout		3,686	62.0	
Registered electors		5,948		
Labour hold		Swing		

East Chesterton
Party	Candidate	Votes	%	±%
Liberal Democrats	Julian Huppert	1,760	42.3	
Labour	Kevin Bonnett	1,504	36.2	
Conservative	Colin Havercroft	893	21.5	
Majority		256	6.2	
Turnout		4,157	59.5	
Registered electors		6,984		
Liberal Democrats gain from Labour		Swing		

King's Hedges
Party	Candidate	Votes	%	±%
Labour	Janet Jones *	1,351	57.1	
Conservative	Hugh Mennie	586	24.8	
Liberal Democrats	Evelyn Bradford	431	18.2	
Majority		765	32.3	
Turnout		2,368	50.3	
Registered electors		4,711		
Labour hold		Swing		

Market
Party	Candidate	Votes	%	±%
Liberal Democrats	Anthony Bowen *	1,939	50.3	
Labour	Lucy Walker	804	20.9	
Conservative	Ann Watkins	663	17.2	
Green	Angela Ditchfield	446	11.6	
Majority		1,135	29.5	
Turnout		3,852	56.3	
Registered electors		6,842		
Liberal Democrats hold		Swing		

Newnham
Party	Candidate	Votes	%	±%
Liberal Democrats	Elsa Meyland-Smith *	2,489	55.1	
Labour	Susan OiDell	1,156	25.6	
Conservative	W Papworth	869	19.3	
Majority		1,333	29.5	
Turnout		4,514	58.3	
Registered electors		7,739		
Liberal Democrats hold		Swing		

Petersfield
Party	Candidate	Votes	%	±%
Labour	Bachan Bhalla *	1,647	37.9	
Liberal Democrats	Kevin Wilkins	1,207	27.8	
Green	Margaret Wright	793	18.2	
Conservative	Lee Glendon	701	16.1	
Majority		440	10.1	
Turnout		4,348	56.7	
Registered electors		7,675		
Labour hold		Swing		

Queen Edith's
Party	Candidate	Votes	%	±%
Liberal Democrats	Geoffrey Heathcock *	2,255	56.2	
Conservative	Mark Taylor	896	22.3	
Labour	Maria Bell	861	21.5	
Majority		1,359	33.9	
Turnout		4,012	65.9	
Registered electors		6,092		
Liberal Democrats hold		Swing		

Romsey
Party	Candidate	Votes	%	±%
Labour	Jozef Gluza *	1,454	39.9	
Liberal Democrats	Anne Dixon	1,414	38.8	
Conservative	Vivian Ellis	355	9.8	
Green	Vicky Russell	262	7.2	
Independent	Simon Sedgwick-Jell	156	4.3	
Majority		40	1.1	
Turnout		3,641	60.2	
Registered electors		6,051		
Labour hold		Swing		

Trumpington
Party	Candidate	Votes	%	±%
Liberal Democrats	Anne Kent *	1,977	53.7	
Conservative	Christine Kennedy	1,176	32.0	
Labour	Pamela Stacey	527	14.3	
Majority		801	21.8	
Turnout		3,680	61.6	
Registered electors		5,973		
Liberal Democrats hold		Swing		

West Chesterton
Party	Candidate	Votes	%	±%
Liberal Democrats	Maurice Leeke *	1,864	49.0	
Labour	Patrick Schicker	1,202	31.6	
Conservative	James Strachan	741	19.5	
Majority		662	17.4	
Turnout		3,807	63.4	
Registered electors		6,003		
Liberal Democrats hold		Swing		

=== East Cambridgeshire ===
==== Summary ====
East Cambridgeshire District Summary
Party	Seats	+/-	Votes	%	+/-
Conservative	4	▲1	13,181	40.4	+3.1
Liberal Democrats	3	▼1	11,918	36.6	–4.1
Labour	0	Steady	7,053	21.6	+1.3
Green	0	Steady	444	1.4	–0.2
Total	7	Steady	32,596	100.0	

==== Division results ====
Burwell
Party	Candidate	Votes	%	±%
Liberal Democrats	James Fitch	2,732	51.8	
Conservative	Lavinia Edwards	1,781	33.8	
Labour	Susan Coomey	761	14.4	
Majority		951	18.0	
Turnout		5,274	65.0	
Registered electors		8,111		
Liberal Democrats hold		Swing		

Ely North and South
Party	Candidate	Votes	%	±%
Conservative	Victoria Hearne-Casapieri	1,977	39.5	
Liberal Democrats	Donald Adey *	1,910	38.2	
Labour	Victoria Spencer-Barrows	1,115	22.3	
Majority		67	1.3	
Turnout		5,002	62.7	
Registered electors		7,979		
Conservative gain from Liberal Democrats		Swing		

Ely West
Party	Candidate	Votes	%	±%
Conservative	Andrew Mair	1,682	40.6	
Liberal Democrats	Gareth Wilson	1,611	38.9	
Labour	Stephen Hartley	854	20.6	
Majority		71	1.7	
Turnout		4,147	65.4	
Registered electors		6,342		
Conservative gain from Liberal Democrats		Swing		

Littleport
Party	Candidate	Votes	%	±%
Liberal Democrats	Philip Bailey	1,668	42.9	
Conservative	Frederick Brown *	1,601	41.2	
Labour	Philip Scott	616	15.9	
Majority		67	1.7	
Turnout		3,885	55.1	
Registered electors		7,046		
Liberal Democrats gain from Conservative		Swing		

Soham
Party	Candidate	Votes	%	±%
Conservative	John Powley *	2,226	44.7	
Labour	Fiona Ross	1,684	33.8	
Liberal Democrats	Peter Diver	1,072	21.5	
Majority		542	10.9	
Turnout		4,982	56.2	
Registered electors		8,873		
Conservative hold		Swing		

Sutton
Party	Candidate	Votes	%	±%
Conservative	Philip Read *	2,044	47.1	
Labour	Graham Steward	1,181	27.2	
Liberal Democrats	Patricia Pleydell	672	15.5	
Green	John Marsh	444	10.2	
Majority		863	19.9	
Turnout		4,341	60.2	
Registered electors		7,217		
Conservative hold		Swing		

Woodditton
Party	Candidate	Votes	%	±%
Liberal Democrats	Judy Broadway *	2,253	45.4	
Conservative	Mary Russell	1,870	37.7	
Labour	Kate Baker	842	17.0	
Majority		383	7.7	
Turnout		4,965	63.3	
Registered electors		7,839		
Liberal Democrats hold		Swing		

=== Fenland ===
==== Summary ====
Fenland District Summary
Party	Seats	+/-	Votes	%	+/-
Conservative	9	▲1	18,781	50.0	+6.4
Labour	0	▼1	12,764	34.0	±0.0
Liberal Democrats	0	Steady	5,767	15.2	–1.5
Independent	0	Steady	261	0.7	–2.2
Total	9	Steady	37,573	100.0	

==== Division results ====
Benwick and Doddington
Party	Candidate	Votes	%	±%
Conservative	Geoffrey Harper	2,593	56.3	
Labour	Roy Penton	1,255	27.3	
Liberal Democrats	Simon Watkins	755	16.4	
Majority		1,338	29.1	
Turnout		4,603	62.8	
Registered electors		7,325		
Conservative hold		Swing		

Chatteris
Party	Candidate	Votes	%	±%
Conservative	Alan Melton *	2,555	57.7	
Labour	Grant Osbourn	1,070	27.4	
Liberal Democrats	Joan Larholt	583	14.9	
Majority		1,185	30.3	
Turnout		3,908	56.7	
Registered electors		6,887		
Conservative hold		Swing		

Elm
Party	Candidate	Votes	%	±%
Conservative	Jillian Tuck *	1,811	50.2	
Labour	Barry Diggle	1,226	34.0	
Liberal Democrats	Maurice James	570	15.8	
Majority		585	16.2	
Turnout		3,607	55.7	
Registered electors		6,478		
Conservative hold		Swing		

Leverington
Party	Candidate	Votes	%	±%
Conservative	Brian Hardy *	2,549	53.5	
Labour	Ann Purt	1,561	32.8	
Liberal Democrats	Stephen Smithson	655	13.7	
Majority		988	20.7	
Turnout		4,765	60.3	
Registered electors		7,900		
Conservative hold		Swing		

March East
Party	Candidate	Votes	%	±%
Conservative	Frederick Yeulett *	1,945	42.6	
Labour	James Heslop	1,831	40.1	
Liberal Democrats	Barbara Cudmore	528	11.6	
Independent	Christopher Bennett	261	5.7	
Majority		114	2.5	
Turnout		4,565	55.7	
Registered electors		8,200		
Conservative hold		Swing		

March West
Party	Candidate	Votes	%	±%
Conservative	Michael Ogden *	1,751	46.9	
Labour	Richard Lawrie	1,464	39.2	
Liberal Democrats	Fiona McKay-Rae	518	13.9	
Majority		287	7.7	
Turnout		3,733	56.5	
Registered electors		6,608		
Conservative hold		Swing		

Whittlesey
Party	Candidate	Votes	%	±%
Conservative	Ronald Speechley *	2,080	51.4	
Labour	David Lewis	1,449	35.8	
Liberal Democrats	Mark Larholt	516	12.8	
Majority		631	15.6	
Turnout		4,045	61.6	
Registered electors		6,572		
Conservative hold		Swing		

Wisbech North
Party	Candidate	Votes	%	±%
Conservative	Richard Barnwell	1,386	42.8	
Labour	Ron Harris *	1,370	42.3	
Liberal Democrats	David Patrick	481	14.9	
Majority		16	0.5	
Turnout		3,237	49.4	
Registered electors		6,555		
Conservative gain from Labour		Swing		

Wisbech South
Party	Candidate	Votes	%	±%
Conservative	Simon King	2,111	43.9	
Labour	Simon Massen	1,538	32.0	
Liberal Democrats	Margaret Cave	1,161	24.1	
Majority		573	11.9	
Turnout		4,810	54.4	
Registered electors		8,846		
Conservative hold		Swing		

=== Huntingdonshire ===
==== Summary ====
Huntingdonshire District Summary
Party	Seats	+/-	Votes	%	+/-
Conservative	13	▼1	34,819	49.6	±0.0
Liberal Democrats	2	▲1	21,599	30.7	+1.2
Labour	0	Steady	13,573	19.3	±0.0
Green	0	Steady	263	0.4	+0.4
Total	15	Steady	70,254	100.0	

==== Division results ====
Brampton
Party	Candidate	Votes	%	±%
Liberal Democrats	Peter Downes	2,560	52.5	
Conservative	Terence Palmer	1,861	38.2	
Labour	David Brown	455	9.3	
Majority		699	14.3	
Turnout		4,876	69.9	
Registered electors		6,981		
Liberal Democrats gain from Conservative		Swing		

Buckden
Party	Candidate	Votes	%	±%
Conservative	Alec Stenner *	2,603	58.9	
Liberal Democrats	John Grosvenor	1,130	25.6	
Labour	Thelma Lomax	689	15.6	
Majority		1,473	33.3	
Turnout		4,422	66.4	
Registered electors		6,663		
Conservative hold		Swing		

Eaton
Party	Candidate	Votes	%	±%
Liberal Democrats	Sandie Giles	2,396	43.1	
Conservative	Kathleen Gregory	2,373	42.7	
Labour	Patricia Nicholls	795	14.3	
Majority		23	0.4	
Turnout		5,564	58.0	
Registered electors		9,594		
Liberal Democrats gain from Conservative		Swing		

Eynesbury
Party	Candidate	Votes	%	±%
Conservative	Andrew Hansard	1,274	41.6	
Liberal Democrats	Sally Guinee	925	30.2	
Labour	David Nicholls	865	28.2	
Majority		349	11.4	
Turnout		3,064	50.3	
Registered electors		6,096		
Conservative hold		Swing		

Houghton and Wyton
Party	Candidate	Votes	%	±%
Conservative	Ian Bates	2,738	56.3	
Liberal Democrats	Mark Rainer	1,343	27.6	
Labour	Carole Hitchings	780	16.1	
Majority		1,395	28.7	
Turnout		4,861	66.7	
Registered electors		7,283		
Conservative hold		Swing		

Huntingdon and Godmanchester
Party	Candidate	Votes	%	±%
Conservative	William Hensley	2,546	40.5	
Labour	Valerie Brooker	1,741	27.7	
Liberal Democrats	Charles Looker	1,738	27.6	
Green	Tim Eiloart	263	4.2	
Majority		805	12.8	
Turnout		6,288	54.3	
Registered electors		11,583		
Conservative hold		Swing		

Huntingdon North
Party	Candidate	Votes	%	±%
Conservative	Ramon Wilkinson *	1,957	50.3	
Labour	Sandra Wilcox	1,268	32.6	
Liberal Democrats	Justin Meadows	668	17.2	
Majority		689	17.7	
Turnout		3,893	54.8	
Registered electors		7,109		
Conservative hold		Swing		

Norman Cross
Party	Candidate	Votes	%	±%
Conservative	Lawrence Mcguire *	2,349	49.9	
Labour	Kevin Goddard	1,624	34.5	
Liberal Democrats	Lena Mitchell	739	15.7	
Majority		725	15.4	
Turnout		4,712	59.0	
Registered electors		7,991		
Conservative hold		Swing		

Priory Park
Party	Candidate	Votes	%	±%
Conservative	Robert Clarke	2,352	56.1	
Liberal Democrats	Michael Pope *	1,271	30.3	
Labour	Janet Boston	570	13.6	
Majority		1,081	25.8	
Turnout		4,193	63.3	
Registered electors		6,628		
Conservative gain from Liberal Democrats		Swing		

Ramsey
Party	Candidate	Votes	%	±%
Conservative	Susan Normington *	2,798	54.4	
Liberal Democrats	Raymond Powell	1,433	27.9	
Labour	Carol Osborne	913	17.8	
Majority		1,365	26.5	
Turnout		5,144	59.5	
Registered electors		8,640		
Conservative hold		Swing		

Sawtry
Party	Candidate	Votes	%	±%
Conservative	Keith Walters *	2,601	55.0	
Liberal Democrats	John Davidson	1,262	26.7	
Labour Co-op	Graeme Watkins	864	18.3	
Majority		1,339	28.3	
Turnout		4,727	63.1	
Registered electors		7,488		
Conservative hold		Swing		

Somersham
Party	Candidate	Votes	%	±%
Conservative	John Eddy *	2,854	53.2	
Liberal Democrats	Alastair Taylor	1,550	28.9	
Labour	Keith Bennett	962	17.9	
Majority		1,304	24.3	
Turnout		5,366	64.0	
Registered electors		8,388		
Conservative hold		Swing		

St Ives North and Warboys
Party	Candidate	Votes	%	±%
Conservative	Victor Lucas	2,101	45.5	
Liberal Democrats	Jack Taylor	1,780	38.5	
Labour	Michael Sneath	742	16.1	
Majority		321	7.0	
Turnout		4,623	54.0	
Registered electors		8,561		
Conservative hold		Swing		

St Ives South
Party	Candidate	Votes	%	±%
Conservative	Roy Pegram *	1,807	42.0	
Liberal Democrats	John Souter	1,767	41.1	
Labour	John Watson	731	17.0	
Majority		40	0.9	
Turnout		4,305	61.1	
Registered electors		7,042		
Conservative hold		Swing		

West Hunts
Party	Candidate	Votes	%	±%
Conservative	Wendy Silby *	2,605	61.8	
Liberal Democrats	Malcolm Howlett	1,037	24.6	
Labour	Robert Lomax	574	13.6	
Majority		1,568	37.2	
Turnout		4,216	69.0	
Registered electors		6,107		
Conservative hold		Swing		

=== South Cambridgeshire ===
==== Summary ====
South Cambridgeshire District Summary
Party	Seats	+/-	Votes	%	+/-
Conservative	8	Steady	26,384	40.0	–0.5
Liberal Democrats	4	▼1	21,480	32.6	–2.1
Labour	2	▲1	14,581	22.1	+1.1
Green	0	Steady	2,730	4.1	+4.1
UKIP	0	Steady	490	0.7	+0.7
Independent	0	Steady	312	0.5	–3.4
Total	14	Steady	65,977	100.0	

==== Division results ====
Bassingbourn
Party	Candidate	Votes	%	±%
Conservative	Linda Oliver	2,290	53.6	
Liberal Democrats	Annette Tattersall	946	22.2	
Labour	Paul Gilchrist	712	16.7	
Green	Simon Saggers	322	7.5	
Majority		1,344	31.5	
Turnout		4,270	65.6	
Registered electors		6,509		
Conservative hold		Swing		

Comberton
Party	Candidate	Votes	%	±%
Liberal Democrats	Robin Martlew *	2,188	43.6	
Conservative	Leslie Hall	1,807	36.0	
Green	Helen McRobie	686	13.7	
Labour	Lucy Munby	333	6.6	
Majority		381	7.6	
Turnout		5,014	69.8	
Registered electors		7,185		
Liberal Democrats hold		Swing		

Cottenham
Party	Candidate	Votes	%	±%
Conservative	Peter Stroude *	1,636	37.2	
Labour	Arthur Warham	1,526	34.7	
Liberal Democrats	Linden Leeke	782	17.8	
Independent	Dennis Harradine	312	7.1	
Green	Nicola Barralet	137	3.1	
Majority		110	2.5	
Turnout		4,393	64.6	
Registered electors		6,805		
Conservative hold		Swing		

Fulbourn
Party	Candidate	Votes	%	±%
Labour	Simon Kime	2,221	45.5	
Conservative	Peter Hoskison	1,423	29.2	
Liberal Democrats	Christine Renaut	611	12.5	
UKIP	Neil Scarr	490	10.0	
Green	Mary Lawson	136	2.8	
Majority		798	16.4	
Turnout		4,881	63.6	
Registered electors		7,673		
Labour hold		Swing		

Gamlingay
Party	Candidate	Votes	%	±%
Conservative	Lister Wilson	2,185	43.3	
Liberal Democrats	Jeremy Ridgway	1,837	36.4	
Labour	Graham Hitchings	828	16.4	
Green	Sarah Orme	195	3.9	
Majority		348	6.9	
Turnout		5,045	65.7	
Registered electors		7,678		
Conservative hold		Swing		

Girton
Party	Candidate	Votes	%	±%
Conservative	John Reynolds *	2,405	47.3	
Labour	Michael Wilson	1,280	25.2	
Liberal Democrats	David Charlesworth	1,132	22.2	
Green	William Connolley	273	5.4	
Majority		1,125	22.1	
Turnout		5,090	67.3	
Registered electors		7,559		
Conservative hold		Swing		

Harston
Party	Candidate	Votes	%	±%
Conservative	Robin Driver *	2,306	45.3	
Liberal Democrats	Jonathan Hansford	1,835	36.0	
Labour	Richard Hibbert	787	15.4	
Green	Tandy Harrison	168	3.3	
Majority		471	9.2	
Turnout		5,096	70.2	
Registered electors		7,262		
Conservative hold		Swing		

Histon
Party	Candidate	Votes	%	±%
Labour	Philip Gooden	1,379	34.1	
Conservative	Mark Taylor	1,300	32.1	
Liberal Democrats	Jonathan Chatfield	1,250	30.9	
Green	Kenneth Richard	117	2.9	
Majority		79	2.0	
Turnout		4,046	63.7	
Registered electors		6,352		
Labour gain from Conservative		Swing		

Linton
Party	Candidate	Votes	%	±%
Liberal Democrats	Terence Bear *	2,695	55.1	
Conservative	Joy Stern	1,476	30.2	
Labour	Philip Holloway	719	14.7	
Majority		1,219	24.9	
Turnout		4,890	68.4	
Registered electors		7,148		
Liberal Democrats hold		Swing		

Melbourn
Party	Candidate	Votes	%	±%
Conservative	Mary Chapple	1,967	40.2	
Liberal Democrats	Anthony Milton	1,832	37.4	
Labour	Rosemary Turner	924	18.9	
Green	Pauline Radley	170	3.5	
Majority		135	2.8	
Turnout		4,893	66.4	
Registered electors		7,367		
Conservative gain from Liberal Democrats		Swing		

Sawston
Party	Candidate	Votes	%	±%
Conservative	Anthony Orgee *	2,098	47.2	
Labour	Anna Briggs	1,437	32.3	
Liberal Democrats	John Gibb	915	20.6	
Majority		661	14.9	
Turnout		4,450	62.3	
Registered electors		7,142		
Conservative hold		Swing		

Shelford
Party	Candidate	Votes	%	±%
Liberal Democrats	Michael Farrar	1,710	41.5	
Conservative	Lynda Sutherland	1,550	37.6	
Labour	Amy Moy	733	17.8	
Green	Clive Orme	130	3.2	
Majority		160	3.9	
Turnout		4,123	69.8	
Registered electors		5,907		
Liberal Democrats hold		Swing		

Waterbeach
Party	Candidate	Votes	%	±%
Liberal Democrats	Jane Coston *	2,545	58.7	
Conservative	James Hockney	1,071	24.7	
Labour	Timothy O'Dell *	611	14.1	
Green	Thomas Lachlan-Cope	112	2.6	
Majority		1,474	34.0	
Turnout		4,339	60.7	
Registered electors		7,143		
Liberal Democrats hold		Swing		

Willingham
Party	Candidate	Votes	%	±%
Conservative	Shona Johnstone *	2,870	52.7	
Liberal Democrats	Gareth Marlow	1,202	22.1	
Labour	Sheila Smith	1,091	20.0	
Green	Marion Barber	284	5.2	
Majority		1,668	30.6	
Turnout		5,447	66.0	
Registered electors		8,256		
Conservative hold		Swing		
