= Cambridge City Council =

District council in the county of Cambridgeshire, England

- Coat of arms

Type
- Type: Non-metropolitan district

Leadership
- Mayor: Maria Cleminson, Green since 21 May 2026
- Leader: Katie Thornburrow, Labour since 1 June 2026
- Chief Executive: Robert Pollock since April 2021

Structure
- Seats: 42 councillors
- Graph of the party split among 42 seats.
- Political groups: Minority administration (17) Labour (15) Opposition (27) Green (12) Liberal Democrats (11) Conservative (1) Independent (3)

Elections
- Voting system: First past the post
- Last election: 7 May 2026

Meeting place
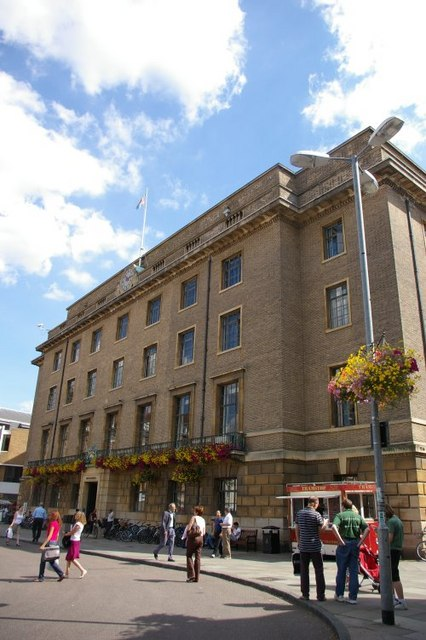
- The Guildhall, Market Square, Cambridge, CB2 3QJ

Website
- www.cambridge.gov.uk

Cambridge City Council is the local authority for Cambridge, a non-metropolitan district with city status in Cambridgeshire, England. The council has been under no overall control since 2026; from 2014–2026 it was under the control of a Labour majority. It meets at Cambridge Guildhall. The council is a member of the Cambridgeshire and Peterborough Combined Authority.

== History ==
Cambridge was an ancient borough. Its date of being established as a borough is unknown, with its earliest known charter dating from 1102. A subsequent charter issued by King John in 1207 granted the borough the right to appoint a mayor. The earliest recorded mayor was Harvey FitzEustace, who served in 1213.

The borough of Cambridge was reformed to become a municipal borough in 1836 under the Municipal Corporations Act 1835, which standardised how boroughs operated across the country. It was then governed by a body formally called the 'Mayor, Aldermen and Burgesses of the Borough of Cambridge', generally known as the corporation, town council or borough council. Cambridge was granted city status on 21 March 1951 in recognition of its history, administrative importance, and economic success, allowing the council to call itself Cambridge City Council.

The Local Government Act 1972 reconstituted Cambridge as a non-metropolitan district with effect from 1 April 1974; it kept the same boundaries and its city status, but there were changes to the council's responsibilities.

The city of Cambridge is completely encircled by the neighbouring district of South Cambridgeshire. The two authorities work together on some projects, such as the Greater Cambridge Local Plan. Since 2017 the city has been a constituent member of the Cambridgeshire and Peterborough Combined Authority, led by the directly-elected Mayor of Cambridgeshire and Peterborough.

== Governance ==
Cambridge City Council provides district-level services, including parks and open spaces, waste collection, council housing and town planning. The Council also organises numerous events throughout the year, including the Cambridge Folk Festival and a programme of free summer entertainment entitled Summer in the City. Cambridgeshire County Council provides County-level services. Cambridge has no civil parishes and is entirely an unparished area.

=== Political control ===
The council was under Labour majority control from 2014 to 2026, when it passed into no overall control.

Political control of the council since the 1974 reforms took effect has been as follows:

Party in control	Years
Labour	1974–1976
Conservative	1976–1979
No overall control	1979–1986
Labour	1986–1987
No overall control	1987–1988
Labour	1988–1992
No overall control	1992–1996
Labour	1996–1998
No overall control	1998–2000
Liberal Democrats	2000–2012
No overall control	2012–2014
Labour	2014–2026
No overall control	2026–present

=== Leadership ===
The role of mayor is largely ceremonial in Cambridge. Political leadership is provided by the leader of the council. The leaders since the 1974 reforms have been:

Councillor	Party	From	To
Peter Wright	Labour	Apr 1974	May 1976
John Powley	Conservative	May 1976	May 1979
Chris Gough-Goodman	Conservative	May 1979	May 1980
Peter Wright	Labour	May 1980	May 1982
Chris Howard	Labour	May 1982	May 1987
Mark Todd	Labour	May 1987	May 1990
Simon Sedgwick-Jell	Labour	May 1990	Oct 1994
Kevin Southernwood	Labour	Oct 1994	Feb 1999
Ruth Bagnall	Labour	Feb 1999	May 2000
David Howarth	Liberal Democrats	May 2000	17 Jul 2003
Ian Nimmo-Smith	Liberal Democrats	17 Jul 2003	27 May 2010
Sian Reid	Liberal Democrats	27 May 2010	24 May 2012
Tim Bick	Liberal Democrats	24 May 2012	12 Jun 2014
Lewis Herbert	Labour	12 Jun 2014	30 Nov 2021
Anna Smith	Labour	30 Nov 2021	25 May 2023
Mike Davey	Labour	25 May 2023	22 May 2025
Cameron Holloway	Labour	22 May 2025	May 2026
Katie Thornburrow	Labour	1 Jun 2026	Present

=== Composition ===
Following the 2026 elections two subsequent defections, the composition of the council is:

Party	Councillors
Labour	15
Green	12
Liberal Democrats	11
Conservative	1
Independent	3
Total	42

== Elections ==
Since the last boundary changes came into effect in 2021, the council has comprised 42 councillors representing 14 wards, with each ward electing three councillors. Elections are held three years out of every four, with a third of the council (one councillor for each ward) elected each time for a four-year term of office. Cambridgeshire County Council elections are held in the fourth year of the cycle when there are no city council elections. The wards are:

- Abbey
- Arbury
- Castle
- Cherry Hinton
- Coleridge
- East Chesterton
- King's Hedges
- Market
- Newnham
- Petersfield
- Queen Edith's
- Romsey
- Trumpington
- West Chesterton

== Premises ==
The council meets at the Guildhall, on the south side of Market Square in the centre of Cambridge. The building was purpose-built for the old borough council and completed in 1939. The council also has offices at Mandela House at 4 Regent Street.

Flag used by Cambridge City Council

== See also ==
- Cambridgeshire County Council
- List of mayors of Cambridge
