= 2026 Cambridge City Council election =

2026 English local government election

- 7 May 2026

15 out of 42 seats to Cambridge City Council (including 1 by-election) 22 seats needed for a majority
	First party	Second party	Third party
Leader	Cameron Holloway (defeated)	Naomi Bennett	Tim Bick
Party	Labour	Green	Liberal Democrats
Last election	25 seats, 41.1%	5 seats, 20.8%	10 seats, 22.0%
Seats before	23	6	11
Seats won	4	7	4
Seats after	17	12	11
Seat change	▼6	▲6	Steady
Popular vote	10,793	13,896	10,264
Percentage	25.3%	32.6%	24.1%
Swing	▼15.8%	▲11.8%	▲2.1%
	Fourth party	Fifth party
Leader	Delowar Hossain
Party	Conservative	Your Party
Last election	1 seat, 13.8%	Did not exist
Seats before	1	1
Seats won	0	0
Seats after	1	1
Seat change	Steady	Steady
Popular vote	3,335	Did not stand
Percentage	7.8%	Did not stand
Swing	▼6.0%	N/A
- Winner of each seat at the 2026 Cambridge City Council election.
Leader before election
Cameron Holloway
Labour
Leader after election
Katie Thornburrow
Labour
No overall control (Note: Labour minority.)

The 2026 Cambridge City Council election was held on 7 May 2026 to elect members of Cambridge City Council in Cambridgeshire, England. This was on the same day as other local elections.

Prior to the election, the council was under Labour majority control. The election saw the council go under no overall control, and the Labour leader of the council, Cameron Holloway, lost his seat. Although they lost their majority, Labour remained the largest party on the council. They subsequently formed a minority administration, with Labour councillor Katie Thornburrow being appointed the new leader of the council at a meeting on 1 June 2026.

Due to ongoing local government reorganisation, this is the final election to Cambridge City Council before it is abolished and replaced by a successor unitary authority. Elections to the successor authority are due to take place in 2027.

== Background ==
In 2024, the Labour Party retained control of the council.

=== Council composition ===
After 2024 election		Before 2026 election	
Party	Seats	Party	Seats
Labour	25	Labour	23
Liberal Democrats	10	Liberal Democrats	11
Green	5	Green	6
Conservative	1	Conservative	1
Your Party	Did not exist	Your Party	1
Independent	1	Independent	0

Changes 2024–2026:

- August 2024: Mairéad Healy (Independent, elected as Labour) resigns – by-election held September 2024
- September 2024: Beth Gardiner-Smith (Labour) wins by-election
- March 2025: Sam Carling (Labour) and Alice Gilderdale (Labour) resign – by-elections held May 2025
- May 2025: Jamie Dalzell (Liberal Democrats) and Bob Illingworth (Liberal Democrats) gain by-elections from Labour
- August 2025: Dave Baigent (Labour) joins Your Party
- March 2026: Ingrid Flaubert (Liberal Democrats) joins Green Party

== Election result ==
2026 Cambridge City Council election
Party	This election				Full council			This election		
Party	Candidates	Seats	Net	Seats %	Other	Total	Total %	Votes	Votes %	+/−
Labour	{{{candidates}}}	4	▼6	26.7	13	17	40.5	10,793	25.3	–15.8
Green	{{{candidates}}}	7	▲6	46.7	5	12	28.6	13,896	32.6	+11.8
Liberal Democrats	{{{candidates}}}	4	Steady	26.7	7	11	26.2	10,264	24.1	+2.1
Conservative	{{{candidates}}}	0	Steady	0.0	1	1	2.4	3,335	7.8	–6.0
Your Party	{{{candidates}}}	0	Steady	0.0	1	1	2.4	N/A (Note: Did not stand candidates.)	N/A	N/A
Reform	{{{candidates}}}	0	Steady	0.0	0	0	0.0	3,926	9.2	N/A
Independent	{{{candidates}}}	0	Steady	0.0	0	0	0.0	366	0.9	–1.2
Communist	{{{candidates}}}	0	Steady	0.0	0	0	0.0	35	0.1	±0.0

== Incumbents ==
Ward	Incumbent councillor	Party	Re-standing
Abbey	Matthew Howard	Green	No
Arbury	Iva Divkovic	Labour	No
Castle	Simon Smith	Labour	Yes
Cherry Hinton	Russ McPherson	Labour	Yes
Coleridge	Anna Smith	Labour	Yes
East Chesterton	Baiju Thittala	Labour	No
King's Hedges	Martin Smart	Labour	Yes
Market	Katie Porrer	Liberal Democrats	Yes
Newnham	Cameron Holloway	Labour	Yes (Note: Standing in Petersfield ward.)
Petersfield	Richard Robertson	Labour Co-op	No
Queen Edith's	Daniel Lee	Liberal Democrats	No
Romsey	Dinah Pounds	Labour	No
Trumpington	Olaf Hauk	Liberal Democrats	Yes
West Chesterton	Richard Swift	Labour	Yes

== Candidates ==
=== Abbey ===
Abbey
Party	Candidate	Votes	%	±%
Green	Maria Cleminson	1,374	51.4	–0.7
Labour	Ruaidhri O'Donnell	455	17.0	–11.0
Reform	Tommy Brace	365	13.6	N/A
Liberal Democrats	Rosemary Ansell	302	11.3	+3.7
Conservative	David Smith	161	6.0	–3.9
Communist	Simon Brignell	17	0.6	–1.2
Majority		919	34.4	+15.3
Turnout		2,674	37.3	
Registered electors		7,165		
Green hold		Swing	▲5.2	

=== Arbury ===
Arbury
Party	Candidate	Votes	%	±%
Green	Sefira Davison	928	32.2	+15.8
Labour Co-op	Jocelynne Scutt	816	28.3	–23.2
Liberal Democrats	Fionna Tod	667	23.1	+8.2
Reform	Will Burrows	290	10.0	N/A
Conservative	Robert Boorman	185	6.4	–10.8
Majority		112	3.9	N/A
Turnout		2,886	45.4	
Registered electors		6,350		
Green gain from Labour		Swing	▲19.5	

=== Castle ===
Castle
Party	Candidate	Votes	%	±%
Green	Alex Sage	757	32.2	+17.0
Liberal Democrats	Luke Patterson	733	31.2	+12.1
Labour	Simon Smith*	599	25.5	–14.5
Reform	Carol Bedson	115	4.9	N/A
Conservative	Dace Ruklisa	85	3.6	–1.0
Independent	Khalid Abu-Tayyem	64	2.7	N/A
Majority		24	1%	N/A
Turnout		2,353	50.9	
Registered electors		4,623		
Green gain from Labour		Swing	▲2.5	

=== Cherry Hinton ===
Cherry Hinton
Party	Candidate	Votes	%	±%
Labour	Russ McPherson*	864	30.9	–17.6
Green	Anusha Iyer	731	26.2	+16.6
Reform	Mike Nicolson	484	17.3	N/A
Liberal Democrats	Ahmad Rushdhi	399	14.3	–0.7
Conservative	Eric Barrett-Payton	315	11.3	–15.5
Majority		133	4.7	–4.9
Turnout		2,793	44.1	
Registered electors		6,333		
Labour hold		Swing	▼17.1	

=== Coleridge ===
Coleridge
Party	Candidate	Votes	%	±%
Green	Sarah Nicmanis	1,150	39.1	+5.0
Labour Co-op	Anna Smith*	1,070	36.4	–7.1
Reform	Steve Burdett	302	10.3	N/A
Conservative	Sam Worthington	222	7.6	–8.6
Liberal Democrats	Tim Brunton	196	6.7	+0.6
Majority		80	2.7	N/A
Turnout		2,940	47.1	
Registered electors		6,243		
Green gain from Labour Co-op		Swing	▲6.1	

=== East Chesterton ===
East Chesterton
Party	Candidate	Votes	%	±%
Labour	Sarah Haithcock	935	31.8	–10.3
Liberal Democrats	Ania Bobrowska	803	27.3	–4.7
Green	Isaac Groves	718	24.4	+9.0
Reform	Godfrey Orr	297	10.1	N/A
Conservative	Jean-Ann Bartlett	166	5.7	–4.8
Communist	William Dry	18	0.6	N/A
Majority		132	4.5	–4.7
Turnout		2,937	45.6	
Registered electors		6,447		
Labour hold		Swing	▼2.8	

=== King's Hedges ===
King's Hedges
Party	Candidate	Votes	%	±%
Labour	Martin Smart*	713	27.2	–17.9
Green	Daniel Quinn	604	23.1	+12.4
Conservative	Mahfuj Ahmed	493	18.8	–15.3
Reform	John McKay	376	14.4	N/A
Liberal Democrats	David Creek	295	11.3	+1.2
Independent	Zarina Anwar	106	4.0	N/A
Independent	Eleanor Cooke	33	1.3	N/A
Majority		109	4.1	–5.8
Turnout		2,620	39.5	
Registered electors		6,625		
Labour hold		Swing	▼15.2	

=== Market ===
Market
Party	Candidate	Votes	%	±%
Liberal Democrats	Katie Porrer*	854	43.2	+2.3
Green	Alex Sefton-Tromans	592	30.0	+13.7
Labour	Edwin Addo	303	15.3	–19.8
Reform	Mark Wells	127	6.4	N/A
Conservative	Panda Xiong	99	5.0	–2.7
Majority		262	13.2	+5.5
Turnout		1,975	35.6	
Registered electors		5,549		
Liberal Democrats hold		Swing	▼5.7	

=== Newnham ===
Newnham
Party	Candidate	Votes	%	±%
Green	Eleanor Toye Scott	1,046	53.0	+7.2
Liberal Democrats	Katie Barron	327	16.6	+1.4
Labour	Sabina Harris-Hercules	308	15.6	–11.6
Conservative	Poppy Simister-Thomas	162	8.2	+4.0
Reform	Lui Murton	89	4.5	N/A
Independent	David Carmona	42	2.1	–5.6
Majority		719	36.4	+20.7
Turnout		1,974	37.2	
Registered electors		5,296		
Green gain from Labour		Swing	▲2.9	

=== Petersfield ===
Petersfield
Party	Candidate	Votes	%	±%
Green	Kathryn Fisher	1,363	40.9	+19.0
Labour	Cameron Holloway*	1,208	36.3	–15.6
Liberal Democrats	Sam Oliver	412	12.4	–3.2
Reform	Luke Burrows	182	5.5	N/A
Conservative	Paul Roper	164	4.9	–4.0
Majority		155	4.6	N/A
Turnout		3,329	49.2	
Registered electors		6,773		
Green gain from Labour		Swing	▲17.3	

=== Queen Edith's ===
Queen Edith's
Party	Candidate	Votes	%	±%
Liberal Democrats	Amanda Taylor	1,503	49.0	+6.5
Green	Shayne Mitchell	556	18.1	+6.7
Labour	Maruf Ahmed	397	12.9	–15.8
Conservative	Magnus Burt	315	10.3	–7.1
Reform	Colin Bedson	299	9.7	N/A
Majority		947	30.9	+18.8
Turnout		3,070	46.7	
Registered electors		6,572		
Liberal Democrats hold		Swing	▼0.1	

=== Romsey ===
Romsey
Party	Candidate	Votes	%	±%
Green	Jacqui Whitmore	1,521	45.2	+26.1
Labour	Rosy Greenlees	1,124	33.4	–18.8
Liberal Democrats	John Walmsley	347	10.3	–0.9
Reform	Andrew Watson	230	6.8	N/A
Conservative	Rob Nelson	141	4.2	–3.4
Majority		397	11.8	N/A
Turnout		3,363	49.9	
Registered electors		6,734		
Green gain from Labour		Swing	▲22.5	

=== Trumpington ===
Trumpington (2 seats due to by-election)
Party	Candidate	Votes	%	±%
Liberal Democrats	Olaf Hauk*	1,272	40.9	+4.5
Liberal Democrats	John Grimwood	1,148	36.9	+0.5
Green	Edward Gokmen	854	27.5	+14.7
Green	Chloe Mosonyi	772	24.8	+12.0
Labour Co-op	Carlos Toranzos	477	15.3	–17.0
Labour	Henry Shailer	444	14.3	–18.0
Conservative	Steven George	397	12.8	–5.8
Reform	Guy Greenway	293	9.4	N/A
Conservative	John Ionides	283	9.1	–9.5
Reform	Samuel Lloyd	275	8.8	N/A
Turnout		~3,108	41.1	
Registered electors		7,570		
Liberal Democrats hold				
Liberal Democrats hold				

=== West Chesterton ===
West Chesterton
Party	Candidate	Votes	%	±%
Labour	Richard Swift*	1,080	31.0	–11.9
Liberal Democrats	Guy Mills	1,006	28.9	–7.1
Green	Hannah Copley	930	26.7	+13.5
Reform	Geoff Leach	202	5.8	N/A
Conservative	Mike Harford	147	4.2	–3.7
Independent	Nick Picton	121	3.5	N/A
Majority		74	2.1	–4.4
Turnout		3,486	55.6	
Registered electors		6,248		
Labour hold		Swing	▼2.4	
