= Woodditton =

Village in Cambridgeshire, England

Coordinates: 52.1996°N 0.4345°E

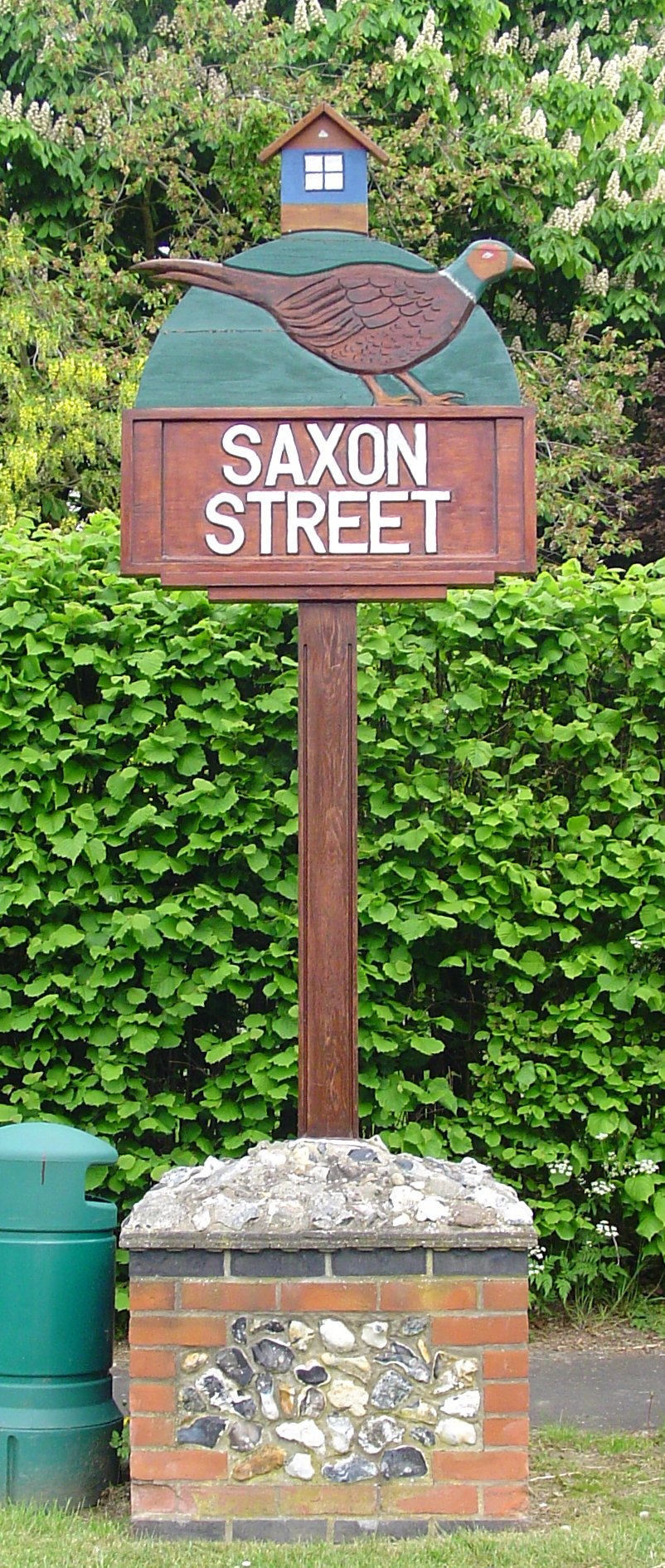
- Village sign in Saxon Street

- Location within Cambridgeshire
- Population: 1,818 (2011)
- OS grid reference: TL6658
- District: East Cambridgeshire
- Shire county: Cambridgeshire
- Region: East
- Country: England
- Sovereign state: United Kingdom
- Post town: Newmarket
- Postcode district: CB8
- Dialling code: 01638
- Police: Cambridgeshire
- Fire: Cambridgeshire
- Ambulance: East of England

Woodditton is a village and civil parish in East Cambridgeshire, England. The other settlements in the parish are Ditton Green, Little Ditton and Saxon Street. At the time of the 2001 census, the parish's population (including Kirtling) was 1,789. In 2011, the population was recorded as 1,818.

Woodditton lies at the southeastern end of the Devil's Dyke, a defensive earthwork thought to be of Anglo-Saxon origin.

The Lord of the Manor of Woodditton in the later 16th century was Sir Robert Cotton, Knt., a younger son of the Lord of the Manor of Landwade, Cambridgeshire.
