= Castle, Cambridge =

District and electoral ward of Cambridge, England

Coordinates: 52.212°N 0.115°E

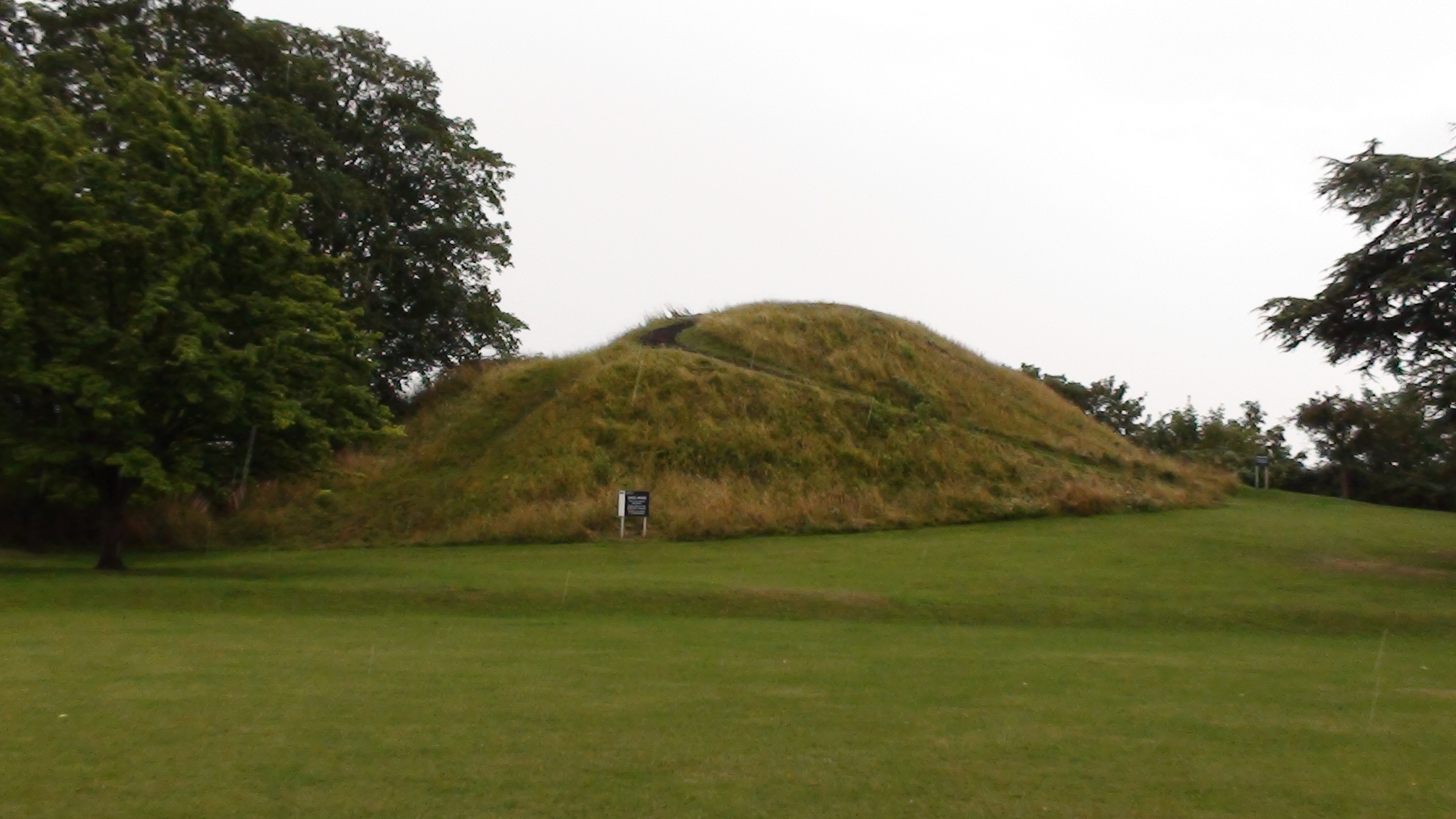
The mound of Cambridge Castle

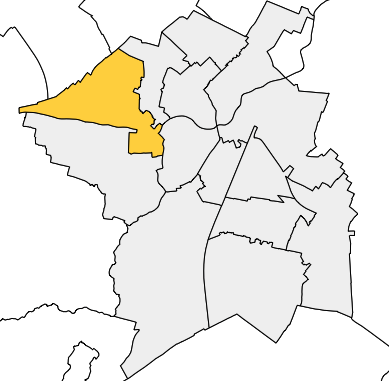
Electoral boundary of Castle ward

Castle is a suburb and electoral ward in Cambridge, England. It is named after the former Cambridge Castle which once stood on Castle Mound. As of the 2021 UK census, the ward had a population of 7,861 people.

The population of Castle Ward is being increased by the North West Cambridge Development, at its centre, Eddington, which began to be occupied in 2017.

Castle ward borders the following other wards within the city of Cambridge (from North, proceeding clockwise): Arbury, Market and Newnham. Castle is represented by three councillors on Cambridge City Council. Castle Electoral Division, which has different boundaries since 2017, is represented by one councillor on Cambridgeshire County Council.

== See also ==
- Castle Hill, Cambridge
