= Market (Cambridge electoral ward) =

Electoral ward in Cambridge, England

Market ward is an electoral ward within Cambridge City Council, to which it elects 3 councillors.

== Election results ==
Election	Political result	Candidate	Party	Votes	%	±%
2015 election	Green gain from Liberal Democrats; Majority: 7 (0.2%) N/A; Swing: 3.4% from Lab to Grn	Oscar Gillespie	Green	1,147	27.7	+2.0
2015 election	Green gain from Liberal Democrats; Majority: 7 (0.2%) N/A; Swing: 3.4% from Lab to Grn	Danielle Greene	Labour	1,140	27.5	-4.7
2015 election	Green gain from Liberal Democrats; Majority: 7 (0.2%) N/A; Swing: 3.4% from Lab to Grn	Dom Weldon	Liberal Democrats	1,134	27.4	+2.9
2015 election	Green gain from Liberal Democrats; Majority: 7 (0.2%) N/A; Swing: 3.4% from Lab to Grn	Daniel Coughlan	Conservative	726	17.5	-0.3
2014 election	Labour gain from Liberal Democrats; Majority: 182 (6.5%); Swing: 7.2% from Lib Dem to Lab	Dan Ratcliffe	Labour	903	32.2	+2.9
2014 election	Labour gain from Liberal Democrats; Majority: 182 (6.5%); Swing: 7.2% from Lib Dem to Lab	Maximillian Fries	Green	721	25.7	+5.5
2014 election	Labour gain from Liberal Democrats; Majority: 182 (6.5%); Swing: 7.2% from Lib Dem to Lab	Colin Rosenstiel	Liberal Democrats	678	24.2	-11.4
2014 election	Labour gain from Liberal Democrats; Majority: 182 (6.5%); Swing: 7.2% from Lib Dem to Lab	Alex Boyd	Conservative	500	17.8	+2.9
