= Arbury =

Suburb of Cambridge, England

Coordinates: 52.2234°N 0.1170°E

- Suburb
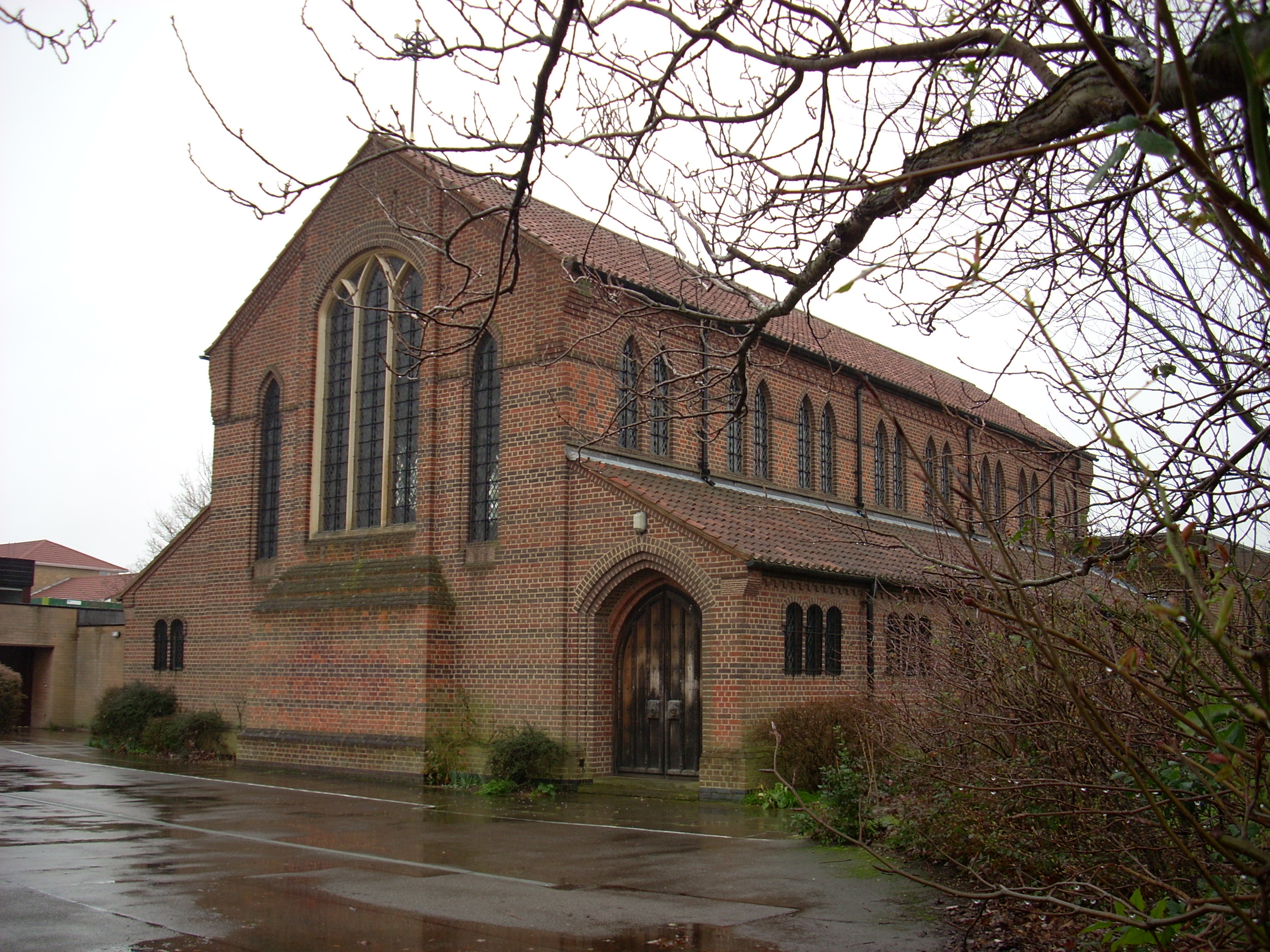
- Church of the Good Shepherd

- Location within Cambridgeshire
- Population: 9,883
- OS grid reference: TL457611
- Shire county: Cambridgeshire
- Region: East
- Country: England
- Sovereign state: United Kingdom
- Post town: CAMBRIDGE
- Postcode district: CB4
- Dialling code: 01223
- Police: Cambridgeshire
- Fire: Cambridgeshire
- Ambulance: East of England
- UK Parliament: Cambridge

Arbury is a suburb and electoral ward in Cambridge, England. As of the 2021 UK census, the ward had a population of 9,883 people.

== History ==
The area has been occupied since at least Roman times. In the 1950s, stone coffins from the 2nd century were discovered, as well as the remains of a Roman villa and mausoleum. In medieval times, a circular earthwork of unknown age was visible just to the north of where Arbury Road meets Histon Road (now part of Orchard Park) and was known as Harborough or Arbury Camp. The earthwork was formerly around 100 metres in length, though its western half (extending into Impington) was no longer visible by the start of the 19th century. It is thought to have been an undefended Iron Age enclosure to protect animals from predators.

In medieval times, the area was common land, and local peasants were permitted to graze their sheep on the meadow between Lammas and Lady Day. In the 17th and 18th centuries the meadows were dug for earth to make bricks.

Arbury was historically part of the parishes of Chesterton and Impington. The area was developed by Cambridge City Council from 1957 as a housing estate of around 100 acres.

Electoral ward boundaries have changed substantially over the years and continue to do so. As a result, much of what was originally in Arbury Ward is now in King's Hedges Ward. This ward was formed out of the northern area of the original Arbury Ward, and includes the northern part of the original Arbury estate along with community facilities such as Arbury Community Centre. The ward system in the Arbury district has little to do with historical facts - and re-warding has seen large areas placed in 'Arbury Ward' which have nothing to do with the original estate or the area's history - including Stretten Avenue, and Garden Walk. In the 're-warding' by Cambridge City Council in 2021, Arbury Ward 'Lost the Chesterton triangle, gained Garden Walk, Warwick Road area and Arbury Court'.

In 1980, local primary schools took part in a project called 'Arbury 1980' - which traced the history of the district back to the iron age and resulted in the 1981 book Arbury Is Where We Live!.

== Local life ==
The community is served by the Church of the Good Shepherd, a red brick church designed by Stephen Dykes Bower. The chancel was built in 1958 and the nave in 1963–4. Opened in 1963, it became the parish church of its own parish in 1969. The Arbury community centre opened in 1974, which is also home to the Arbury Community Church.

The Roman Catholic community of Arbury worship at St Laurence's Church in Milton Road.

Arbury Court houses a post office, library, supermarket and other local shops. The Carlton Arms public house lies on Carlton Way, which follows the route of the Roman Akeman Street. Crime rates are lower here than in many parts of central Cambridge.

Each June a community carnival is held in Arbury Town Park.
