= 2017 Cambridgeshire County Council election =

2017 UK local government election

- 4 May 2017

All 61 seats to Cambridgeshire County Council 31 seats needed for a majority
- Turnout: 36.2%
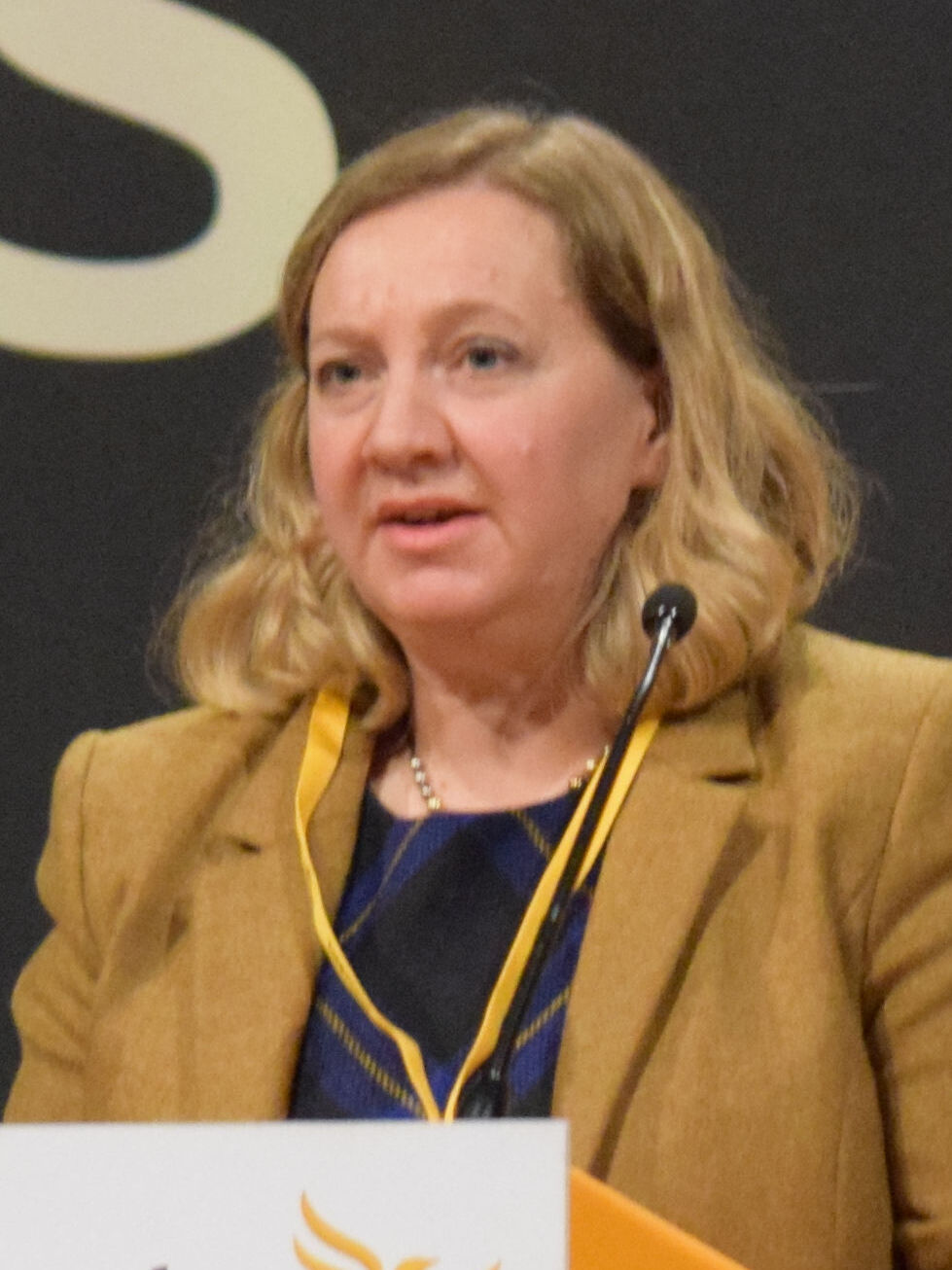
	First party	Second party	Third party
	Con		Lab
Leader	Steve Count	Lucy Nethsingha	Ashley Walsh
Party	Conservative	Liberal Democrats	Labour
Leader since	25 April 2014	May 2015	May 2015
Leader's seat	March North & Waldersey	Newnham	Petersfield (retired)
Last election	32 seats, 33.6%	14 seats, 19.7%	7 seats, 17.4%
Seats before	32	14	8
Seats won	36	15	7
Seat change	▲4	▲1	Steady
Popular vote	68,467	50,716	30,830
Percentage	40.4%	29.9%	18.0%
Swing	▲6.8%	▲10.1%	▲0.6%
	Fourth party	Fifth party	Sixth party
Party	St. Neots Ind.	Independent	Green
Last election	2 seats, 1.4%	2 seats, 2.8%	0 seats, 3.3%
Seats before	2	2	0
Seats won	2	1	0
Seat change	Steady	▼1	Steady
Popular vote	3,107	4,307	6,744
Percentage	1.8%	2.7%	3.7%
Swing	▲0.4%	▼0.1%	▲0.4%
	Seventh party
Leader	Paul Bullen
Party	UKIP
Leader since	8 December 2013
Leader's seat	St Ives (Contested Warboys & The Stukeleys) (defeated)
Last election	12 seats, 21.1%
Seats before	10
Seats won	0
Seat change	▼12
Popular vote	6,555
Percentage	3.6%
Swing	▼16.4%
- Map showing the results of the 2017 Cambridgeshire County Council elections.
Council control before election
No Overall Control
Council control after election
Conservative

The 2017 Cambridgeshire County Council election was held on 4 May 2017 as part of the 2017 local elections in the United Kingdom. All 61 councillors were elected from 59 electoral divisions, which returned either one or two county councillors each by first-past-the-post voting for a four-year term of office.

Boundary changes to the electoral divisions took effect at this election after a review of the county by the Local Government Boundary Commission for England, reducing the number of county councillors from 69 to 61, and the number of electoral divisions from 60 to 59.

The election took place on the same day as the first direct mayoral election for the newly created Cambridgeshire and Peterborough Combined Authority.

The Conservative Party won a majority on the council, while the UK Independence Party lost all their seats.

== Previous composition ==
=== 2013 election ===
Party	Seats
Conservative	32
Liberal Democrats	14
UKIP	12
Labour	7
The St Neots Independent Group	2
Independent	2
Total	69

=== Composition of council seats before election ===
Party	Seats
Conservative	32
Liberal Democrats	14
UKIP	10
Labour	8
The St Neots Independent Group	2
Independent	3
Total	69

=== Changes between elections ===
In between the 2017 election and the 2021 election, the following council seats changed hands:

Division	Date	Previous Party	New Party	Cause	Resulting Council Composition					
Division	Date	Previous Party	New Party	Cause	Con	LD	UKIP	Lab	SNI	Ind
Wisbech South	4 June 2015	UKIP	Conservative	UKIP incumbent resigned. Conservatives won by-election.	33	14	11	7	2	2
Romsey	25 June 2015	Liberal Democrats	Labour	Liberal Democrat incumbent resigned. Labour won by-election.	33	13	11	8	2	2
Little Paxton and St Neots North	21 August 2015	Conservative	Independent	Councillor quit party to sit as an independent member.	32	13	11	8	2	3
Sutton	18 February 2016	Conservative	Liberal Democrats	Conservative incumbent died. Liberal Democrats won by-election.	31	14	11	8	2	3
Bassingbourn	29 February 2016	Conservative	UKIP	Sitting councillor joined UKIP.	30	14	12	8	2	3
Sawtry and Ellington	18 July 2016	UKIP	Conservative	Sitting councillor joined Conservatives.	31	14	11	8	2	3
Warboys & Upwood	16 September 2016	UKIP	Conservative	Sitting councillor joined Conservatives.	32	14	10	8	2	3

== Results summary ==
Cambridgeshire County Council election, 2017
Party	Candidates	Seats	Gains	Losses	Net gain/loss	Seats %	Votes %	Votes	+/−
Conservative	61	36	11	7	+4 (Note: Change from notional 2013 results due to boundary changes)	59.0	40.6	73,145	+6.9
Liberal Democrats	60	15	2	1	+1	24.6	29.7	53,485	+10.0
Labour	61	7	2	2	0	11.5	18.2	32,864	+0.8
St. Neots Ind.	4	2	0	0	0	3.3	1.8	3,107	+1.8
Independent	11	1	1	2	−1	1.6	2.4	4,103	−1.3
Green	32	0	0	0	0	0	3.7	6,744	+0.4
UKIP	21	0	0	12	−12	0	3.6	6,555	−17.5
Total	250	61	▼8					180,003	

Popular vote
Conservative	40.64%
Liberal Democrats	29.71%
Labour	18.26%
Green	3.75%
UKIP	3.64%
Others	4.01%

Council seats
Conservative	59.02%
Liberal Democrats	24.59%
Labour	11.48%
St. Neots Ind	3.28%
Independent	1.64%

=== Election of Group Leaders ===
Steve Count (March North & Waldersey) was reelected leader of the Conservative Group, Lucy Nethsingha (Newnham) was reelected leader of the Liberal Democratic Group, and Joan Whitehead (Abbey) was elected leader of the Labour Group. In late 2019 Elisa Meschini (King's Hedges) replaced Whitehead as Labour leader

=== Election of Leader of the Council ===
Steve Count the leader of the Conservative group was duly elected leader of the council and formed a Conservative administration.

== Results by district ==
All electoral divisions elected one councillor unless stated otherwise.

=== Cambridge ===
==== Summary ====
Cambridge District Summary
Party	Seats	+/-	Votes	%	+/-
Labour	7	Steady	13,542	37.1	−2.4
Liberal Democrats	5	▼1	13,582	37.2	+7.1
Conservative	0	Steady	5,408	14.8	+0.4
Green	0	Steady	3,005	8.2	−0.6
Independent	0	▼1	750	2.1	−1.6
UKIP	0	Steady	258	0.7	−2.6
Total	12	▼2	28,116	100.0	

==== Division results ====
Abbey
Party	Candidate	Votes	%	±%
Labour	Joan Whitehead *	1,022	40.60	−12.77
Liberal Democrats	Nicky Shepard	947	37.62	+26.55
Conservative	Kevin Francis	336	13.35	−3.71
Green	Monica Hone	212	8.42	−10.08
Majority		75	2.98	−31.89
Turnout		2,517	38.7	+12.6
Labour hold		Swing	−19.7	

Arbury
Party	Candidate	Votes	%	±%
Labour	Jocelynne Scutt *	1,331	44.83	−4.6
Liberal Democrats	Cecilia Liszka	919	30.95	+14.2
Conservative	Henry Collins	542	18.26	+6.8
Green	Lucas Ruzowitzky	177	6.0	−3.9
Majority		412	13.9	−18.7
Turnout		2,980	43.5	+14.5
Labour hold		Swing	−9.4	

Castle
Party	Candidate	Votes	%	±%
Labour	Claire Richards	777	29.78	+13.1
Independent	John Hipkin *	750	28.75	−12.3
Liberal Democrats	Paul Sagar	736	28.21	−4.4
Conservative	Edward MacNaghten	199	7.63	+1.9
Green	Gareth Bailey	147	5.63	N/A
Majority		27	1.03	−7.4
Turnout		2,609	46.2	+16.9
Labour gain from Independent		Swing	+12.7	

Cherry Hinton
Party	Candidate	Votes	%	±%
Labour	Sandra Crawford *	1,555	48.79	−9.7
Conservative	James Mathieson	718	22.53	−0.3
Liberal Democrats	John Oakes	699	21.93	+14.1
Green	Maximilian Fries	215	6.75	−4.1
Majority		837	26.26	−9.4
Turnout		3,187	39.0	+7.6
Labour hold		Swing	−4.7	

Chesterton
Party	Candidate	Votes	%
Liberal Democrats	Ian Manning *	1,715	44.09
Labour	Kelley Green	1,407	36.17
Conservative	Connor MacDonald	481	12.37
Green	Stephen Lawrence	199	5.12
UKIP	Peter Burkinshaw	88	2.26
Majority		308	7.92
Turnout		3,890	48.6
Liberal Democrats win (new seat)			

King's Hedges
Party	Candidate	Votes	%	±%
Labour	Elisa Meschini	1,247	40.08	−8.8
Liberal Democrats	Jamie Dalzell	1,056	33.94	+14.8
Conservative	Anette Karimi	427	13.73	−1.6
Green	Angela Ditchfield	211	6.78	N/A
UKIP	David Corn	170	5.5	N/A
Majority		191	6.1	−23.6
Turnout		3,124	37.1	+13.5
Labour hold		Swing	−11.8	

Market
Party	Candidate	Votes	%	±%
Liberal Democrats	Nichola Harrison	965	41.87	+8.8
Labour	Nick Gay	678	29.41	−0.8
Green	Jeremy Caddick	425	18.44	−0.2
Conservative	Henry Mitson	237	10.3	−7.7
Majority		287	12.5	+9.6
Turnout		2,318	33.5	+10.8
Liberal Democrats hold		Swing	+4.8	

Newnham
Party	Candidate	Votes	%	±%
Liberal Democrats	Lucy Nethsingha *	1,221	51.17	+8.0
Labour	Joe Dale	673	28.21	−7.6
Conservative	Julius Carrington	299	12.5	+0.1
Green	Mark Slade	193	8.09	−0.5
Majority		548	23.0	+15.6
Turnout		2,394	40.3	+12.4
Liberal Democrats hold		Swing	+7.8	

Petersfield
Party	Candidate	Votes	%	±%
Labour	Linda Jones	1,410	41.16	−14.8
Liberal Democrats	Emma Bates	1,161	33.89	+17.9
Green	Virgil Ierubino	467	13.63	−2.2
Conservative	Linda Yeatman	388	11.3	−0.9
Majority		249	7.3	−32.6
Turnout		3,436	42.6	+14.3
Labour hold		Swing	−16.3	

Queen Ediths
Party	Candidate	Votes	%	±%
Liberal Democrats	Amanda Taylor *	1,678	46.38	+1.6
Labour	Adam Pounds	962	26.59	−8.5
Conservative	Manas Deb	752	20.78	+7.2
Green	Joel Chalfen	226	6.3	−0.2
Majority		716	19.8	+10.1
Turnout		3,632	48.8	+8.4
Liberal Democrats hold		Swing	+5.1	

Romsey
Party	Candidate	Votes	%	±%
Labour	Noel Kavanagh *	1,633	44.67	+13.0
Liberal Democrats	Simon Cooper	1,359	37.17	−10.7
Conservative	Simon Lee	335	9.2	+4.8
Green	Caitlin Patterson	329	9.00	+3.1
Majority		274	7.5	−8.6
Turnout		3,667	43.6	+6.7
Labour gain from Liberal Democrats		Swing	+11.8	

Trumpington
Party	Candidate	Votes	%	±%
Liberal Democrats	Donald Adey	1,116	39.01	+2.0
Labour	Katie Thornburrow	847	29.61	+13.7
Conservative	Shapour Meftah	694	24.26	−11.4
Green	Ceri Galloway	204	7.1	−4.3
Majority		269	9.4	+8.0
Turnout		2,872	44.3	+9.9
Liberal Democrats hold		Swing	−5.8	

=== East Cambridgeshire ===
==== Summary ====
East Cambridgeshire District Summary
Party	Seats	+/-	Votes	%	+/-
Conservative	7	▼1	11,600	54.2	+10.0
Liberal Democrats	1	▲1	6,605	30.8	+12.5
Labour	0	Steady	2,710	12.7	−1.1
Green	0	Steady	502	2.3	+0.6
Total	8	▼1	21,417	100.00	

==== Division results ====
Burwell
Party	Candidate	Votes	%	±%
Conservative	Josh Schumann *	1,557	53.89	+7.8
Liberal Democrats	Charlotte Cane	642	22.22	+1.9
Labour	Liz Swift	381	13.19	−1.1
Green	Flora May Waterhouse	309	10.70	N/A
Majority		915	31.69	+5.9
Turnout		2,887	33.6	+3.4
Conservative hold		Swing	+3.0	

Ely North
Party	Candidate	Votes	%
Conservative	Lis Every	1,192	49.32
Liberal Democrats	Alison Whelan	855	35.37
Labour	Mark Hucker	370	15.31
Majority		337	13.9
Turnout		2,430	35.9
Conservative win (new seat)			

Ely South
Party	Candidate	Votes	%
Conservative	Anna Bailey *	1,627	46.08
Liberal Democrats	Christine Whelan	1,368	38.74
Labour	Rebecca Denness	536	15.18
Majority		259	7.3
Turnout		3,557	42.9
Conservative win (new seat)			

Littleport
Party	Candidate	Votes	%	±%
Conservative	David Smith	863	57.23	+27.9
Labour	Jane Frances	335	22.21	+7.0
Liberal Democrats	Martin Seidel	310	20.56	+1.0
Majority		528	35.0	+28.5
Turnout		1,508	22.6	+2.3
Conservative gain from UKIP		Swing	N/A	

Soham North & Isleham
Party	Candidate	Votes	%
Conservative	Paul Raynes	1,504	66.23
Liberal Democrats	Rupert Moss-Eccardt	396	17.44
Labour	Isobel Morris	371	16.34
Majority		1,108	48.8
Turnout		2,296	27.0
Conservative win (new seat)			

Soham South & Haddenham
Party	Candidate	Votes	%
Conservative	Bill Hunt *	1,828	57.72
Liberal Democrats	Pauline Wilson	826	26.08
Labour	Lydia Hill	320	10.10
Green	Andy Cogan	193	6.1
Majority		1,002	31.6
Turnout		3,167	37.6
Conservative win (new seat)			

Sutton
Party	Candidate	Votes	%	±%
Liberal Democrats	Lorna Dupré *	1,441	45.8	+13.0
Conservative	Michael Bradley	1,353	42.9	−6.4
Labour	Christopher Horne	355	11.3	−6.6
Majority		88	2.8	−13.8
Turnout		3,163	37.0	+11.2
Liberal Democrats gain from Conservative		Swing	+9.7	

Woodditton
Party	Candidate	Votes	%	±%
Conservative	Mathew Shuter *	1,676	58.4	−1.8
Liberal Democrats	John Trapp	767	26.7	+8.1
Labour	Steven O'Dell	426	14.9	−6.3
Majority		909	31.7	−7.4
Turnout		2,485	33.6	+5.4
Conservative hold		Swing	−4.9	

=== Fenland ===
==== Summary ====
Fenland District Summary
Party	Seats	+/-	Votes	%	+/-
Conservative	9	▲3	13,284	54.7	+15.0
Labour	0	Steady	3,332	13.7	−0.4
UKIP	0	▼5	2,956	12.2	−17.2
Liberal Democrat	0	Steady	2,272	9.4	−0.2
Independent	0	Steady	1,573	6.5	+1.1
Green	0	Steady	858	3.5	+3.5
Total	9	▼2	24,275	100.00	

==== Division results ====
Chatteris
Party	Candidate	Votes	%	±%
Conservative	Anne Hay	1,086	48.46	+14.0
UKIP	Dick Mandley *	429	19.1	−15.6
Independent	Steve Nicholson	201	8.9	N/A
Labour	David Lewis	178	7.94	−1.5
Liberal Democrats	John Freeman	176	7.85	−13.5
Independent	Daniel Divine *	171	7.6	
Majority		657	29.3	+29.0
Turnout		2,254	27.3	−0.2
Conservative gain from UKIP		Swing	+14.8	

March North & Waldersey (2 seats)
Party	Candidate	Votes	%
Conservative	Steve Count *	2,263	53.4
Conservative	Jan French	2,094	49.4
Labour	Katharine Bultitude	856	20.2
Labour	Martin Field	850	20.1
Liberal Democrats	Stephen Court	605	14.3
UKIP	Caroline Smith	561	13.2
UKIP	Robin Talbot	481	11.4
Liberal Democrats	Scott Lansdell-Hill	340	8.0
Green	Ruth Johnson	248	5.9
Green	Andrew Crawford	191	4.5
Majority		1,238	29.2
Turnout		4,237	24.9
Conservative win (new seat)			
Conservative win (new seat)			

March South & Rural
Party	Candidate	Votes	%
Conservative	John Gowing	969	39.75
Independent	Rob Skoulding	910	37.33
Labour	Steven Smith	174	7.14
UKIP	Daniel Spencer	157	6.4
Liberal Democrats	Neil Morrison	126	5.17
Green	Elizabeth Wright	102	4.18
Majority		59	2.4
Turnout		2,445	30.0
Conservative win (new seat)			

Roman Bank & Peckover
Party	Candidate	Votes	%	±%
Conservative	Simon King	1,455	54.17	+13.5
Liberal Democrats	Gavin Booth	615	22.90	+19.2
UKIP	Chris Schooling	364	13.6	−27.6
Labour	Jes Hibbert	252	9.38	−5.1
Majority		840	31.3	+30.8
Turnout		2,686	29.1	−3.4
Conservative gain from UKIP		Swing	+20.6	

Whittlesey North
Party	Candidate	Votes	%	±%
Conservative	Christopher Boden *	1,365	65.69	+10.1
Labour	Steve Jansky	279	13.43	+0.9
UKIP	Dawn Rhys-Owain	244	11.7	−17.8
Green	Alex Oates	97	4.67	N/A
Liberal Democrats	Frank Bellard	93	4.48	N/A
Majority		1,086	52.3	+26.2
Turnout		2,084	27.2	−6.5
Conservative hold		Swing	+4.6	

Whittlesey South
Party	Candidate	Votes	%	±%
Conservative	David Connor	1,692	66.43	+12.3
UKIP	Dai Rhys-Owain	266	10.4	N/A
Labour	Martin Lodziak	247	9.70	−6.8
Liberal Democrats	Graham Kitchen	192	7.54	N/A
Green	Karen Alexander	150	5.89	N/A
Majority		1,426	56.0	+31.2
Turnout		2,555	29.8	+2.0
Conservative hold		Swing	+0.9	

Wisbech East
Party	Candidate	Votes	%
Conservative	Samantha Hoy *	1,284	63.19
Labour	Sue Marshall	306	15.06
UKIP	Susan Carson	243	12.0
Independent	Fay Allen	135	6.64
Liberal Democrats	Gareth Wilson	64	3.15
Majority		978	48.1
Turnout		2,045	25.8
Conservative win (new seat)			

Wisbech West
Party	Candidate	Votes	%
Conservative	Steve Tierney	1,076	61.00
UKIP	Paul Clapp *	211	11.96
Labour	Tina Eyres	190	10.77
Independent	Sharon Home	119	6.8
Green	Jane Feaviour-Clarke	70	3.97
Liberal Democrats	Christopher Ross	61	3.5
Independent	Jonathan Miller	37	2.1
Majority		865	49.0
Turnout		1,781	26.9
Conservative win (new seat)			

=== Huntingdonshire ===
==== Summary ====
Huntingdonshire District Summary
Party	Seats	+/-	Votes	%	+/-
Conservative	11	▲3	20,787	48.8	+13.2
Liberal Democrats	3	Steady	9,061	21.3	+8.5
St. Neots Ind.	2	Steady	3,107	7.3	+2.9
Independent	1	▲1	1,406	3.3	+0.4
Labour	0	Steady	5,251	12.3	+1.1
UKIP	0	▼6	2,984	7.0	−24.9
Total	17	▼2	42,596	100.0	

==== Division results ====
Alconbury & Kimbolton
Party	Candidate	Votes	%
Conservative	Ian Gardener	1,943	61.7
Liberal Democrats	Michael Baker	973	30.9
Labour	Kevin Goddard	231	7.3
Majority		970	30.8
Turnout		3,168	39.7
Conservative win (new seat)			

Brampton & Buckden
Party	Candidate	Votes	%
Liberal Democrats	Peter Downes *	1,536	48.6
Conservative	Hamish Masson	1,422	45.0
Labour	Sue Foster	205	6.5
Majority		114	3.6
Turnout		3,174	40.7
Liberal Democrats win (new seat)			

Godmanchester & Huntingdon South
Party	Candidate	Votes	%
Liberal Democrats	Graham Wilson *	1,194	52.3
Conservative	Bill Hensley	656	28.7
Labour	Samuel Sweek	282	12.4
UKIP	Dan Morris	152	6.7
Majority		538	23.6
Turnout		2,291	34.0
Liberal Democrats win (new seat)			

Huntingdon North & Hartford
Party	Candidate	Votes	%
Liberal Democrats	Michael Shellens *	882	35.0
Conservative	Emily Barley	838	33.3
Labour	Nik Johnson	532	21.1
UKIP	Peter Ashcroft *	265	10.5
Majority		44	1.7
Turnout		2,532	30.1
Liberal Democrats win (new seat)			

Huntingdon West
Party	Candidate	Votes	%
Independent	Tom Sanderson	1,018	48.6
Conservative	Peter Brown *	532	25.4
Liberal Democrats	Joe Jordan	299	14.3
Labour	Patrick Kadewere	247	11.8
Majority		486	23.2
Turnout		2,096	29.6
Independent win (new seat)			

Ramsey & Bury
Party	Candidate	Votes	%
Conservative	Adela Costello	1,296	45.1
UKIP	Peter Reeve *	1,152	40.1
Labour	Kevin Minnette	260	9.1
Liberal Democrats	Alex Wasyliw	163	5.7
Majority		144	5.0
Turnout		2,877	36.4
Conservative win (new seat)			

Sawtry & Stilton
Party	Candidate	Votes	%
Conservative	Simon Bywater *	2,022	68.8
Labour	Margaret Cochrane	405	13.8
UKIP	Roger Henson *	269	9.2
Liberal Democrats	Geoff Harvey	244	8.3
Majority		1,617	55.0
Turnout		2,953	31.9
Conservative win (new seat)			

Somersham & Earith
Party	Candidate	Votes	%	±%
Conservative	Steve Criswell *	1,862	68.2	+16.0
Liberal Democrats	Tony Jebson	393	14.4	+3.0
Labour	Iain Ramsbottom	299	10.9	+2.8
UKIP	Callum Duffy	178	6.5	−21.8
Majority		1,469	53.8	+29.9
Turnout		2,732	35.7	+1.4
Conservative hold		Swing	+6.5	

St Ives North & Wyton
Party	Candidate	Votes	%
Conservative	Ryan Fuller	1,223	54.2
Liberal Democrats	David Hodge	404	17.9
Labour	Sam Feeney	391	17.3
UKIP	Margaret King	238	10.6
Majority		819	36.3
Turnout		2,278	28.2
Conservative win (new seat)			

St Ives South & Needingworth
Party	Candidate	Votes	%
Conservative	Kevin Reynolds *	1,491	59.3
Labour	John Watson	537	21.3
Liberal Democrats	Lakkana Yalagala	488	19.4
Majority		954	37.9
Turnout		2,550	33.1
Conservative win (new seat)			

St Neots East & Gransden
Party	Candidate	Votes	%
Conservative	Julie Wisson	865	52.6
Liberal Democrats	James Catmur	375	22.8
St. Neots Ind.	James Corley	218	13.2
Labour	Stephen Hinchley	188	11.4
Majority		490	29.8
Turnout		1,651	33.6
Conservative win (new seat)			

St Neots Eynesbury
Party	Candidate	Votes	%
St. Neots Ind.	Simone Taylor *	818	43.4
Conservative	Robert Moores	649	34.5
Liberal Democrats	Claire Piper	228	12.1
Labour	Sam Wakeford	189	10.0
Majority		169	9.0
Turnout		1,889	23.9
St. Neots Ind. win (new seat)			

St Neots Priory Park & Little Paxton
Party	Candidate	Votes	%
Conservative	David Wells	1,069	42.9
Liberal Democrats	Carol McMahon	599	24.1
St. Neots Ind.	Paul Davies	565	22.7
Labour	Christine Green	255	10.3
Majority		470	18.9
Turnout		2,502	31.7
Conservative win (new seat)			

St Neots The Eatons
Party	Candidate	Votes	%
St. Neots Ind.	Derek Giles *	1,506	46.3
Conservative	Beth Hughes	893	27.4
Independent	Bob Farrer	388	11.9
Liberal Democrats	James Bartrick	250	7.7
Labour	Rob Gardiner	217	6.7
Majority		613	18.8
Turnout		3,268	34.3
St. Neots Ind. win (new seat)			

The Hemingfords & Fenstanton
Party	Candidate	Votes	%	±%
Conservative	Ian Bates *	1,766	62.2	+14.6
Liberal Democrats	David Priestman	785	27.6	+18.0
Labour	Robert Leach	289	10.2	+0.5
Majority		981	34.5	+20.1
Turnout		2,864	38.3	+6.0
Conservative hold		Swing	−1.7	

Warboys & The Stukeleys
Party	Candidate	Votes	%
Conservative	Terry Rogers	1,142	62.4
UKIP	Paul Bullen *	273	14.9
Liberal Democrats	Tony Hulme	248	13.6
Labour Co-op	Graeme Watkins	166	9.1
Majority		869	47.5
Turnout		1,842	32.4
Conservative win (new seat)			

Yaxley & Farcet
Party	Candidate	Votes	%
Conservative	Mac McGuire	1,118	52.4
Labour	Jonathan Orchard	558	26.2
UKIP	Paul Richardson	457	21.4
Majority		560	26.3
Turnout		2,152	25.7
Conservative win (new seat)			

=== South Cambridgeshire ===
==== Summary ====
South Cambridgeshire District Summary
Party	Seats	+/-	Votes	%	+/-
Conservative	9	▼1	22,066	40.1	+4.6
Liberal Democrats	6	▲1	21,975	40.0	+12.4
Labour	0	Steady	7,647	13.9	−1.5
Green	0	Steady	2,146	3.9	−1.2
Independent	0	▼1	786	1.4	−1.4
UKIP	0	Steady	357	0.7	−12.9
Total	15	▼1	54,977	100.0	

==== Division results ====
Bar Hill
Party	Candidate	Votes	%	±%
Conservative	Lynda Harford *	1,202	40.09	−5.3
Liberal Democrats	Mark Argent	836	27.89	+19.4
Labour	Stuart Hilpert	550	18.35	+4.7
Green	Teal Riley	252	8.41	−1.0
UKIP	Helena Green	158	5.27	−16.8
Majority		366	12.21	−11.2
Turnout		2,998	42.4	+7.4
Conservative hold		Swing	−12.4	

Cambourne
Party	Candidate	Votes	%
Conservative	Mark Howell	1,145	43.27
Liberal Democrats	Peter Hedges	721	27.25
Labour	Gavin Clayton	590	22.30
Green	Marcus Pitcaithly	190	7.18
Majority		424	16.02
Turnout		2,646	33.3
Conservative win (new seat)			

Cottenham & Willingham
Party	Candidate	Votes	%
Conservative	Timothy Wotherspoon	1,207	35.31
Liberal Democrats	Neil Gough	1,205	35.25
Labour	Alex Tiley	421	12.32
Independent	Mike Mason *	412	12.05
Green	Colin Coe	173	5.06
Majority		2	0.06
Turnout		3,418	42.1
Conservative win (new seat)			

Duxford
Party	Candidate	Votes	%	±%
Conservative	Peter Topping *	2,066	55.12	+12.4
Liberal Democrats	Peter McDonald	1,248	33.30	+4.3
Labour	Jackie Scott	286	7.6	−2.1
Green	Matthew Barton	148	3.95	N/A
Majority		818	21.8	+8.2
Turnout		3,768	46.3	+8.3
Conservative hold		Swing	+4.1	

Fulbourn
Party	Candidate	Votes	%	±%
Liberal Democrats	John Williams *	1,217	43.39	−1.5
Conservative	Alan Sharp	899	32.05	−0.2
Labour	Tim Andrews	548	19.54	+3.0
Green	Oliver Fisher	141	5.03	−1.4
Majority		318	11.3	−1.3
Turnout		2,823	39.9	+5.6
Liberal Democrats hold		Swing	−0.6	

Gamlingay
Party	Candidate	Votes	%	±%
Liberal Democrats	Sebastian Kindersley *	1,505	42.23	−7.5
Conservative	Heather Williams	1,448	40.63	+15.7
Independent	Alison Elcox	374	10.49	+10.5
Labour	John Goodall	237	6.7	−2.3
Majority		57	1.6	−23.2
Turnout		3,575	43.2	+5.7
Liberal Democrats hold		Swing	−11.6	

Hardwick
Party	Candidate	Votes	%	±%
Conservative	Lina Joseph	1,840	46.9	+5.2
Liberal Democrats	Philip Allen	1,369	34.9	−2.6
Labour	Norman Crowther	456	11.6	−9.2
Green	Anna Gomori-Woodcock	258	6.6	+6.6
Majority		471	12.0	+7.8
Turnout		3,948	45.7	+13.7
Conservative hold		Swing	+3.9	

Histon & Impington
Party	Candidate	Votes	%
Liberal Democrats	John Jenkins *	1,938	53.86
Conservative	Othman Cole	834	23.18
Labour	Beccy Talmy	602	16.73
Green	Darren Cotterell	224	6.2
Majority		1,104	30.7
Turnout		3,618	43.6
Liberal Democrats win (new seat)			

Linton
Party	Candidate	Votes	%	±%
Liberal Democrats	Henry Batchelor	1,957	47.60	+7.5
Conservative	John Bald	1,579	38.41	−1.8
Green	Paul Richardson	293	7.1	+7.1
Labour	Ernie Turkington	282	6.86	−1.8
Majority		378	9.2	+9.2
Turnout		4,131	48.4	+5.8
Liberal Democrats gain from Conservative		Swing	+4.6	

Longstanton, Northstowe & Over
Party	Candidate	Votes	%
Conservative	Peter Hudson *	1,112	45.91
Liberal Democrats	Sarah Cheung Johnson	965	39.84
Labour	Simon Down	226	9.3
Green	Sandra Archer	119	4.91
Majority		147	6.1
Turnout		2,433	40.8
Conservative win (new seat)			

Melbourn & Bassingbourn
Party	Candidate	Votes	%
Liberal Democrats	Susan van de Ven *	1,693	56.2
Conservative	Joshua Huntingfield	773	25.7
UKIP	Adrian Dent *	199	6.6
Green	Simon Saggers	174	5.8
Labour	Chris Coleridge	173	5.7
Majority		920	30.5
Turnout		3,017	38.8
Liberal Democrats win (new seat)			

Papworth & Swavesey
Party	Candidate	Votes	%	±%
Conservative	Mandy Smith *	1,495	56.0	+6.4
Liberal Democrats	Peter Sandford	660	24.7	+17.8
Labour	Darren Macey	305	11.4	−1.0
Green	Gaynor Clements	211	7.9	−2.5
Majority		835	31.3	+2.3
Turnout		2,683	36.9	+5.9
Conservative hold		Swing	−5.71	

Sawston & Shelford (2 seats)
Party	Candidate	Votes	%
Conservative	Kevin Cuffley	2,698	42.9
Conservative	Roger Hickford *	2,584	41.1
Liberal Democrats	Peter Fane	2,528	40.2
Liberal Democrats	Brian Milnes	2,427	38.6
Labour	Mike Nettleton	1,194	19.0
Labour	Sue Whitney	1,186	18.8
Majority		56	0.9
Turnout		6,325	42.4
Conservative win (new seat)			
Conservative win (new seat)			

Waterbeach
Party	Candidate	Votes	%	±%
Liberal Democrats	Anna Bradnam	1,706	46.4	+3.9
Conservative	George Walker	1,184	32.2	−4.6
Labour	Gareth Wright	591	16.1	+9.4
Green	Eleanor Crane	196	5.3	+1.1
Majority		522	14.2	+8.5
Turnout		3,697	43.6	+2.7
Liberal Democrats hold		Swing	+4.2	
