= 2010 Huntingdonshire District Council election =

2010 UK local government election

Map of the results of the 2010 Huntingdonshire District Council election. Conservatives in blue, Liberal Democrats in yellow and UK Independence Party in purple. Wards in dark grey were not contested in 2010.

The 2010 Huntingdonshire District Council election took place on 6 May 2010 to elect members of Huntingdonshire District Council in Cambridgeshire, England. One third of the council was up for election and the Conservative Party stayed in overall control of the council.

After the election, the composition of the council was:

- Conservative 37
- Liberal Democrats 12
- UK Independence Party 2
- Independent 1

== Background ==
After the last election in 2008 the Conservatives continued to run the council with 38 councillors, while the Liberal Democrats had 12 and there were 2 independents. However, in July 2009 the UK Independence Party won their first seat on the council after Peter Reeve won a by-election for Ramsey ward, taking the seat from the Liberal Democrats. He was then joined by the other Ramsey councillor, Andy Monk, who had been elected at another by-election in April 2009 as a Conservative, but defected to the UK Independence Party in January 2010.

Meanwhile, the Liberal Democrats gained a seat from the Conservatives in another by-election in Fenstanton in February 2010. These changes meant that going into the 2010 election there were 36 Conservative, 12 Liberal Democrat, 2 UK Independence Party and 2 independent councillors.

== Election result ==
The Conservatives increased their majority on the council by 1 to have a majority of 22 seats on the council.

Huntingdonshire local election result 2010
Party	Seats	Gains	Losses	Net gain/loss	Seats %	Votes %	Votes	+/−
Conservative	13	2	1	+1	76.5	47.6	27,102	-5.1%
Liberal Democrats	3	1	1	0	17.6	32.3	18,358	+2.4%
UKIP	1	0	0	0	5.9	8.7	4,941	+3.1%
Labour	0	0	0	0	0	10.1	5,744	+4.0%
Independent	0	0	1	-1	0	0.5	308	-4.7%
Green	0	0	0	0	0	0.5	288	-0.1%
Monster Raving Loony	0	0	0	0	0	0.3	143	+0.3%

== Ward results ==
Alconbury and The Stukeleys
Party	Candidate	Votes	%	±%
Conservative	Keith Baker	1,108	58.4	−9.9
Liberal Democrats	Ann Monk	621	32.7	+6.4
Labour	Marion Kadewere	168	8.9	+3.5
Majority		487	25.7	−16.4
Turnout		1,897	75.3	+26.8
Conservative hold		Swing		

Buckden
Party	Candidate	Votes	%	±%
Liberal Democrats	Terry Clough	1,249	63.4	+4.0
Conservative	Laine Kadic	633	32.1	−6.3
Labour	Sybil Tuckwood	87	4.4	+2.2
Majority		616	31.3	+10.3
Turnout		1,969	77.0	+24.1
Liberal Democrats hold		Swing		

Earith
Party	Candidate	Votes	%	±%
Conservative	Terry Rogers	1,890	53.6	−18.1
Liberal Democrats	Tony Hulme	980	27.8	+5.4
UKIP	Raymond Zetter	357	10.1	+10.1
Labour	Cindy Cochrane	296	8.4	+2.5
Majority		910	25.8	−23.5
Turnout		3,523	74.5	+39.6
Conservative hold		Swing		

Elton and Folksworth
Party	Candidate	Votes	%	±%
Conservative	Nick Guyatt	994	61.0	−22.4
Liberal Democrats	Roy Benford	322	19.8	+19.8
Labour	Mary Howell	166	10.2	−6.4
UKIP	Roger Henson	147	9.0	+9.0
Majority		672	41.3	−25.6
Turnout		1,629	75.7	+35.8
Conservative hold		Swing		

Godmanchester
Party	Candidate	Votes	%	±%
Conservative	Colin Hyams	1,697	50.4	+3.7
Liberal Democrats	Malcolm Cohen	1,388	41.3	−3.7
Labour	Ruth Pugh	279	8.3	+4.2
Majority		309	9.2	+7.5
Turnout		3,364	70.4	+29.5
Conservative hold		Swing		

Gransden and The Offords
Party	Candidate	Votes	%	±%
Conservative	Richard West	1,712	62.5	−13.2
Liberal Democrats	Anna Hayward	802	29.3	+5.0
Labour	Christine Ellarby	225	8.2	+8.2
Majority		910	33.2	−18.2
Turnout		2,739	76.7	+35.6
Conservative hold		Swing		

Huntingdon East
Party	Candidate	Votes	%	±%
Liberal Democrats	Stephen Greenall	2,075	46.2	−1.1
Conservative	Sid Akthar	1,766	39.3	+0.5
Labour	Patrick Kadewere	453	10.1	+4.2
Green	Jeff Knott	202	4.5	+2.1
Majority		309	6.9	−1.6
Turnout		4,496	64.8	+25.9
Liberal Democrats hold		Swing		

Huntingdon West
Party	Candidate	Votes	%	±%
Conservative	Stephen Cawley	1,439	47.8	−22.4
Liberal Democrats	Michael Burrell	911	30.3	+15.2
Labour	Ann Beevor	383	12.7	+4.6
UKIP	Ian Curtis	192	6.4	+6.4
Green	Karen How	86	2.9	−3.8
Majority		528	17.5	−37.6
Turnout		3,011	63.0	+30.8
Conservative hold		Swing		

Ramsey
Party	Candidate	Votes	%	±%
UKIP	Peter Reeve	1,937	45.1	+23.3
Conservative	Angela Curtis	1,563	36.4	−9.8
Liberal Democrats	Mel Allgood	553	12.9	−14.3
Labour	Susan Coomey	243	5.7	+0.9
Majority		374	8.7	
Turnout		4,296	66.1	+33.6
UKIP hold		Swing		

Sawtry
Party	Candidate	Votes	%	±%
Conservative	Darren Tysoe	1,641	46.9	+4.1
Liberal Democrats	David Cutter	1,223	35.0	+35.0
Labour	Valerie Brooker	323	9.2	+5.1
UKIP	Shirley Reeve	310	8.9	+8.9
Majority		418	12.0	
Turnout		3,497	70.5	+31.7
Conservative gain from Independent		Swing		

St Ives East
Party	Candidate	Votes	%	±%
Conservative	Deborah Reynolds	1,530	48.2	−7.0
Liberal Democrats	Robin Waters	923	29.1	+8.6
Labour	Angela Richards	374	11.8	+5.1
UKIP	Margaret King	347	10.9	−6.7
Majority		607	19.1	−15.6
Turnout		3,174	61.6	+30.3
Conservative hold		Swing		

St Ives South
Party	Candidate	Votes	%	±%
Conservative	Doug Dew	1,528	47.0	−18.8
Liberal Democrats	David Hodge	1,037	31.9	+6.1
Labour	Richard Allen	325	10.0	+1.7
UKIP	Michael Horwood	218	6.7	+6.7
Monster Raving Loony	Lord Toby Jug	143	4.4	+4.4
Majority		491	15.1	−24.9
Turnout		3,251	65.1	+25.1
Conservative hold		Swing		

St Neots Eynesbury
Party	Candidate	Votes	%	±%
Liberal Democrats	Steven Van De Kerkhove	2,007	44.1	+8.7
Conservative	Ian Gardener	1,632	35.8	−19.1
Labour	Francis O'Connor	539	11.8	+2.1
UKIP	Marian Appleton	375	8.2	+8.2
Majority		375	8.2	
Turnout		4,553	60.0	+34.5
Liberal Democrats gain from Conservative		Swing		

St Neots Priory Park
Party	Candidate	Votes	%	±%
Conservative	Barry Chapman	1,625	49.4	+3.0
Liberal Democrats	Bob Eaton	1,322	40.2	−7.2
Labour	Patricia Nicholls	341	10.4	+4.3
Majority		303	9.2	
Turnout		3,288	65.4	+30.3
Conservative gain from Liberal Democrats		Swing		

The Hemingfords
Party	Candidate	Votes	%	±%
Conservative	Christopher Stephens	2,122	57.2	−11.9
Liberal Democrats	Richard Oliver	986	26.6	+26.6
Independent	Brian Gilmour	308	8.3	−14.3
Labour	John Watson	297	8.0	−0.2
Majority		1,136	30.6	−15.9
Turnout		3,713	77.4	+33.6
Conservative hold		Swing		

Warboys and Bury
Party	Candidate	Votes	%	±%
Conservative	Peter Bucknell	1,746	52.0	+8.8
Liberal Democrats	Bob Johnson	906	27.0	−19.0
UKIP	Lisa Duffy	407	12.1	+4.5
Labour	Graeme Watkins	299	8.9	+5.7
Majority		840	25.0	
Turnout		3,358	69.4	+30.7
Conservative hold		Swing		

Yaxley and Farcet
Party	Candidate	Votes	%	±%
Conservative	Maddie Banerjee	2,476	48.3	−20.0
Liberal Democrats	Michael Black	1,053	20.5	+20.5
Labour	Margaret Cochrane	946	18.5	+3.9
UKIP	Robert Brown	651	12.7	−4.4
Majority		1,423	27.8	−23.4
Turnout		5,126	63.7	+35.2
Conservative hold		Swing		
