= Fenstanton =

Village in Cambridgeshire, England

Coordinates: 52.3°N 0.07°W

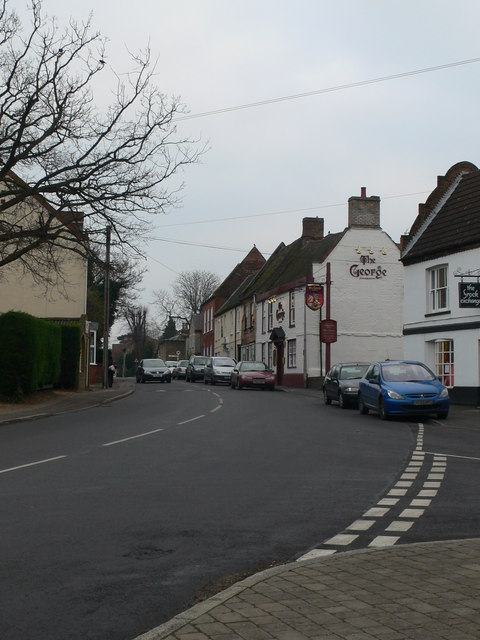
- Fenstanton High Street

- Location within Cambridgeshire
- Population: 2,868; 3,242. (2011)
- OS grid reference: TL318686
- District: Huntingdonshire
- Shire county: Cambridgeshire
- Region: East
- Country: England
- Sovereign state: United Kingdom
- Post town: HUNTINGDON
- Postcode district: PE28
- Dialling code: 01480
- UK Parliament: Huntingdon
- Website: https://www.fenstanton.org/

Fenstanton is a village and civil parish in Cambridgeshire, England, 2 miles (3 km) south of St Ives in Huntingdonshire, a non-metropolitan district of Cambridgeshire and historic county. Fenstanton lies on the south side of the River Ouse.

Known as Stantun in the 11th century, Staunton and Stanton Gisbrit de Gant in the 13th century, the name Fenstanton (and Fennystanton) appeared from the 14th century. The name "Fenstanton" means "fenland stone enclosure".

== History ==
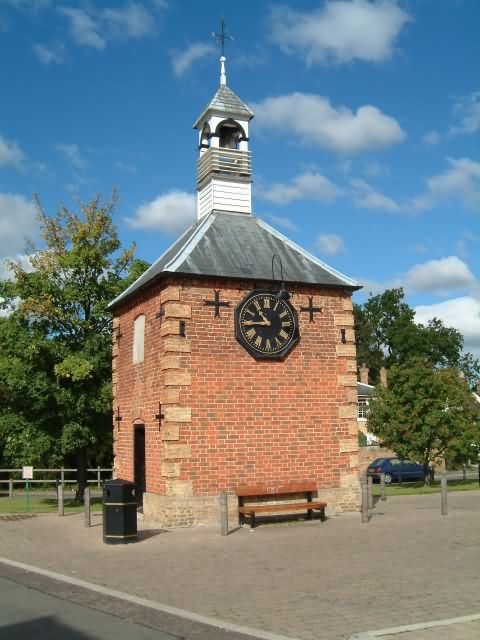
Clock tower/village lock-up

Lying on the Via Devana, the Roman road that linked the army camps at Godmanchester and Cambridge, Fenstanton was the site of a Roman villa, possibly designed to keep order after an attack on the forces of the IX Legion Hispana as they retreated from an ambush at Cambridge by Boudicca's tribesmen. The first evidence of a Roman crucifixion in the UK was discovered in a burial in Fenstanton in 2017, when a skeleton of a man was found with a nail through his heel. In 2021 the bones were unearthed.

The inhabitants of Fenstanton rose in support of Hereward the Wake after the Norman Conquest in 1066. From his stronghold on the Isle of Ely Hereward led resistance against the Normans, causing King William I to assemble a force in Cambridge to deal with the problem. Men were summoned from Huntingdon but they did not pass Fenstanton and escaped with their lives only by swimming across the river.

Fenstanton was listed in Domesday Book of 1086 in the Hundred of Toseland in Huntingdonshire; the name of the settlement was written as Stantone in Domesday Book. In 1086 there was just one manor at Fenstanton; the annual rent paid to the lord of the manor in 1066 had been £17 but had fallen to £16 in 1086, and the parish contained 33 households. By 1086 there was already a church and a priest at Fenstanton.

== Geography ==
The original Fenstanton bypass opened in early February 1965 as a single carriageway three-lane road built by Cementation Company. It was the first part of the busy A604 to be improved. It was further improved when the Godmanchester to Bar Hill section of the A604 was built by Sir Alfred McAlpine (Southern), opening in April 1981. The Bar Hill to Swavesey section had opened first, in early December 1980. It was the A14 from 1994 until 2022. The archaeological works undertaken as a result of the large road improvement scheme found Early Bronze Age burials and cremations at Fenstanton Gravels and give an insight into Bronze Age funerary practices.

== Government ==
As a civil parish, Fenstanton has a parish council consisting of thirteen councillors. The second tier of local government is Huntingdonshire District Council which is a non-metropolitan district of Cambridgeshire and has its headquarters in Huntingdon. Fenstanton is a district ward and is represented on the district council by one councillor. The highest tier of local government is Cambridgeshire County Council which has administration buildings in Alconbury. Fenstanton is part of the electoral division of The Hemingfords and Fen Stanton and is represented on the county council by one councillor.

Fenstanton was in the historic and administrative county of Huntingdonshire until 1965. From 1965, the village was part of the new administrative county of Huntingdon and Peterborough. Then in 1974, following the Local Government Act 1972, Fenstanton became a part of the county of Cambridgeshire.

At Westminster, Fenstanton is in the parliamentary constituency of Huntingdon, and elects one Member of Parliament by the first past the post system of election. From 2001 to 2024 the MP was Jonathan Djanogly of the Conservative Party. In 2024 Ben Obese-Jecty was elected as the new Conservative MP.

== Demography ==
=== Population ===
In the period 1801 to 1901 the population of Fenstanton was recorded every ten years by the UK census. During this time the population was in the range of 704 (the lowest was in 1801) and 1120 (the highest was in 1861).

From 1901, a census was taken every ten years with the exception of 1941 due to the Second World War.

Parish	1911	1921	1931	1951	1961	1971	1981	1991	2001	2011
Fenstanton	863	798	771	972	1061	1659	2480	2600	2868	3242

All population census figures from report Historic Census figures Cambridgeshire to 2011 by Cambridgeshire Insight.

In 2011, the parish covered an area of 2,553 acres (1,033 hectares) and so the population density for Fenstanton in 2011 was 812.7 persons per square mile (313.8 per square kilometre).

== Culture and community ==
The village supports two public houses: The Pipes and the Duchess. In 1851 eight pubs were recorded: The Bell, the Crown, the George, the King William IV, the Rose & Crown, the Royal Oak, the White Horse, the Woolpack and the Duchess.

There is a post office as well as a primary school with an attached pre-school, shared with neighbouring Hilton.

There is a convenience store called Ash's Shop, which won the Small Convenience Store of the Year award at the 2021 Convenience Awards

Fenstanton is the current operating base of Stagecoach in Huntingdonshire.

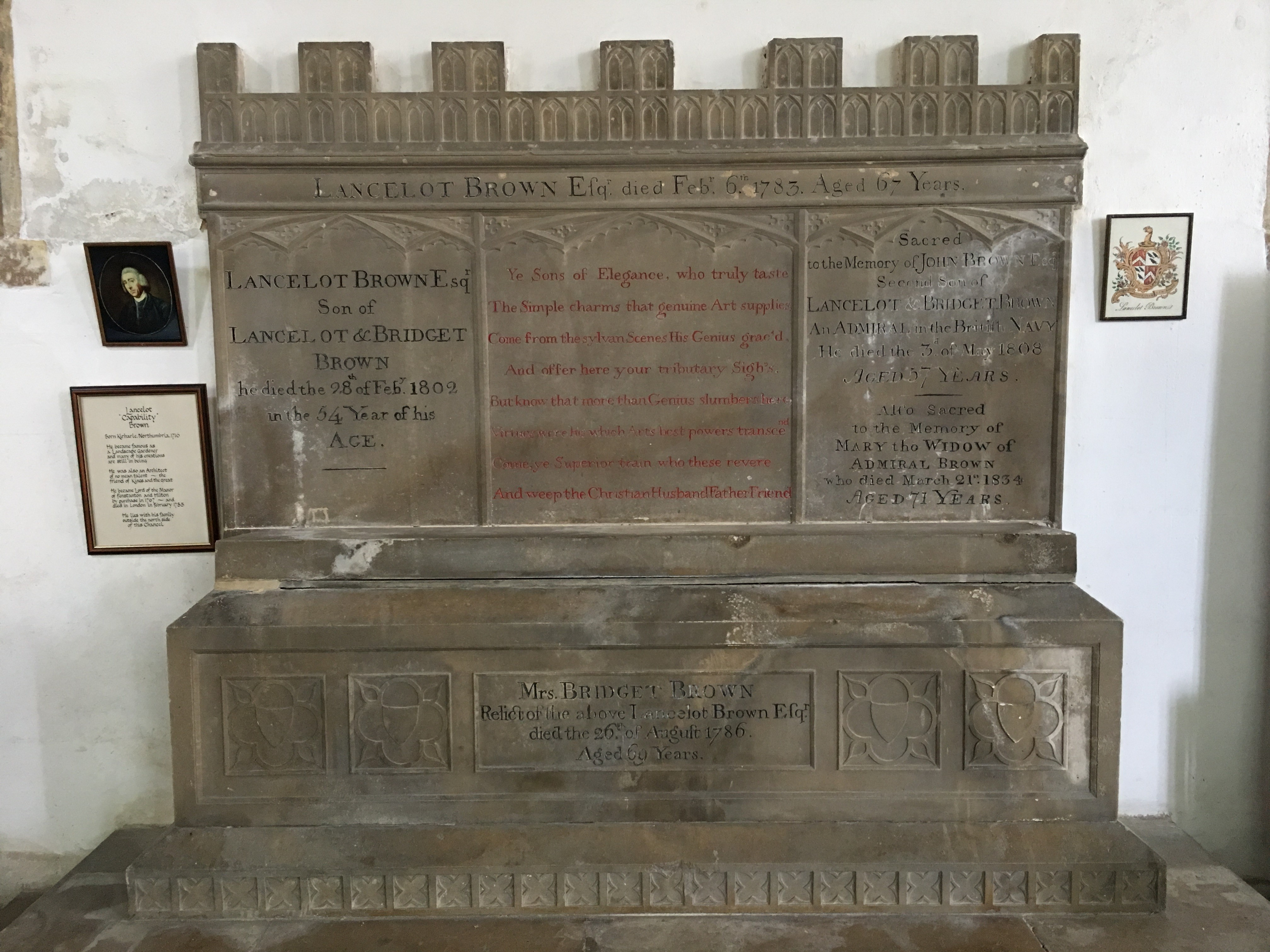
Memorial to the landscape gardener Capability Brown in the church of St Peter and St Paul, Fenstanton, Cambridgeshire. His name is along the top; his son is listed at left.

== Notable people ==
The village is the ancestral home of John Howland, one of the Pilgrim Fathers who arrived on the Mayflower in 1620 at Plymouth, Massachusetts.

In the 18th century Lancelot "Capability" Brown, the famous landscape gardener, bought the Lordship of the Manor of Fenstanton and Hilton from the Earl of Northampton. Brown and his wife, Bridget, are buried in the parish churchyard and the chancel has a memorial to them and two of their sons, John and his wife, Mary, and Lancelot Brown Junior with his wife, Frances, memorialised across the nave.

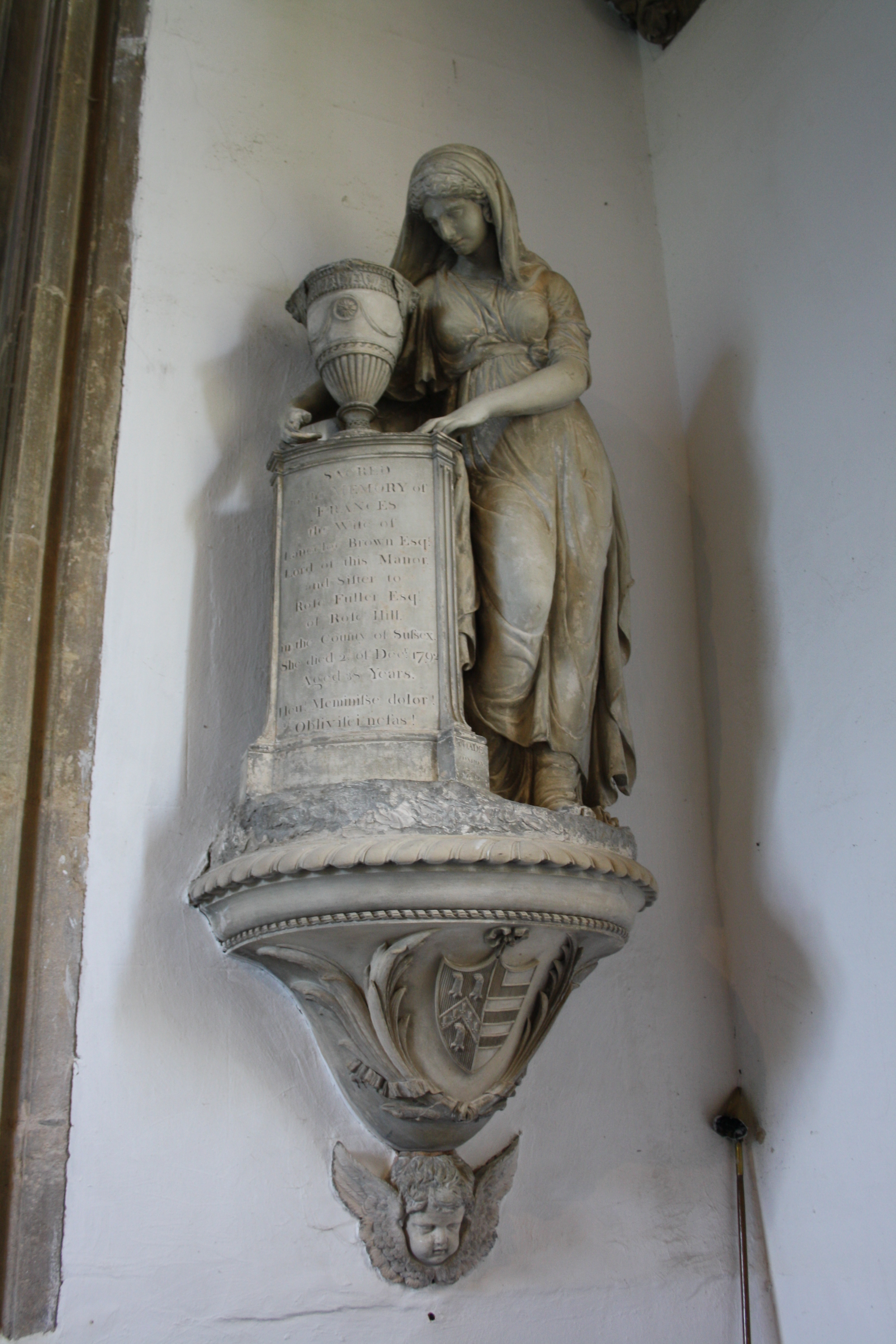
Memorial to Frances Brown, daughter-in-law of Lancelot "Capability" Brown, made from artificial Coade stone

Notable antiquarian M. R. James wrote a ghost story entitled "The Fenstanton Witch", which was not published until after his death. The story also mentions the village of Lolworth, which is a few miles away.

== Religious sites ==
The parish church of St Peter and St Paul dates from the 13th century, though a church on the site was listed in Domesday Book of 1086.

The octagonal spire on the west tower dates from the 14th century, and the church is noted for its chancel, built by 14th-century rector William de Longthorne. The east window, 17 feet in width, is impressive for a church of its size. The six bells date from the 17th and 18th century, the latest being hung in 1981, a gift from The Howland Society in America, descendants of the Mayflower Pilgrims mentioned above.

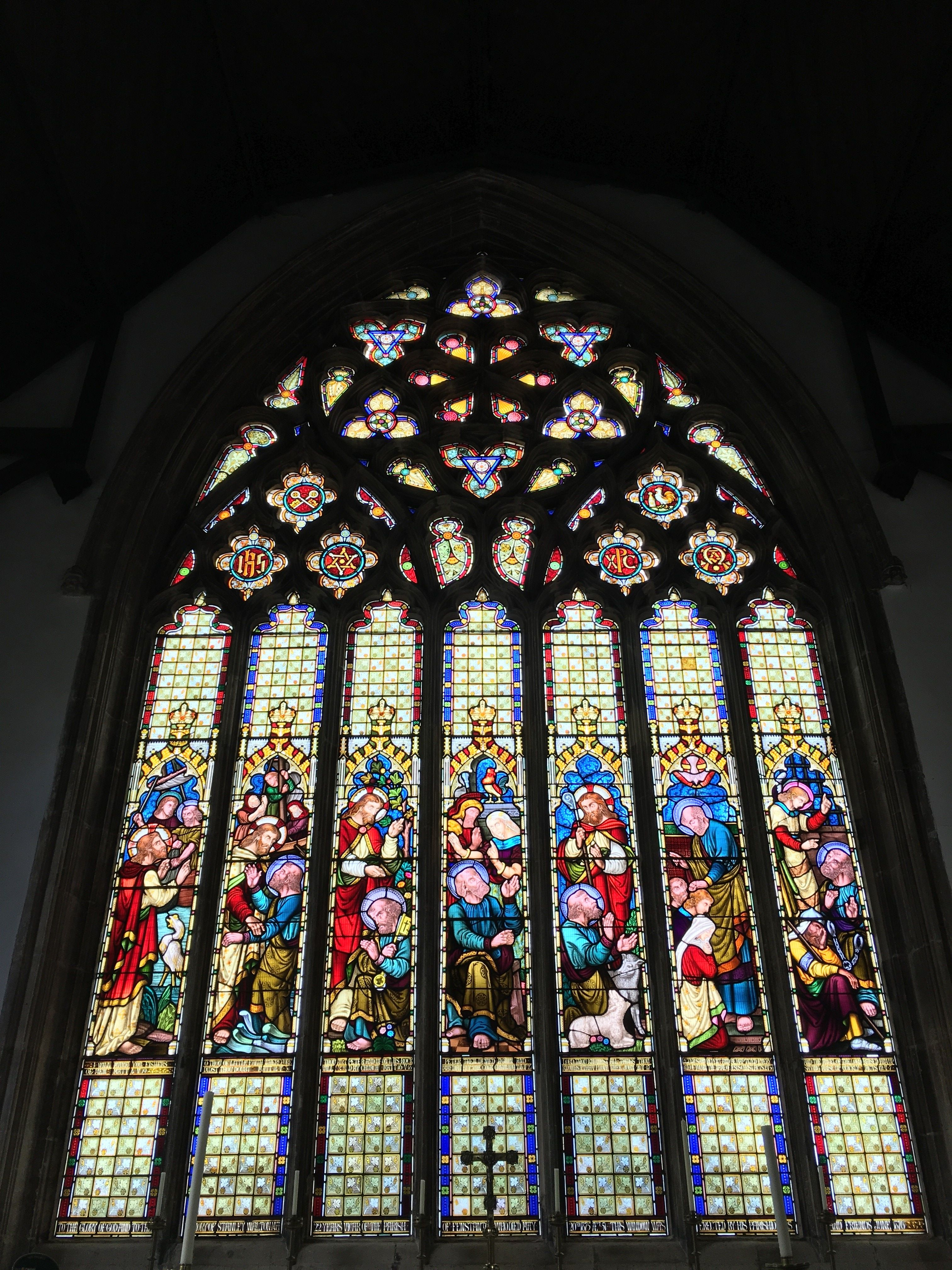
The east window of St Peter and St Paul

The village also has both a Baptist and a United Reformed Church.
