= Swavesey Priory =

Mediaeval monastic house in Swavesey, England

Coordinates: 52°18′20″N 0°00′10″E

Swavesey Priory was a medieval monastic house in the village of Swavesey, Cambridgeshire, England. A church existed in Swavesey at the time of the Norman Conquest, when Alan, Count of Richmond, granted it to the Benedictine Abbey of St Sergius and St Bacchus in Angers, France. The Abbey founded an alien priory in Swavesey by 1086. It ceased to function in 1539, during the dissolution of the monasteries. The site is now a scheduled monument.
