= Lolworth =

Village in Cambridgeshire, England

Coordinates: 52.259°N 0.00262°E

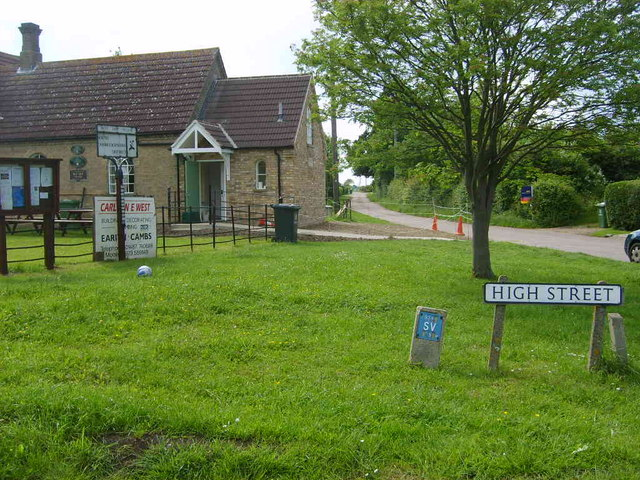
- Lolworth village hall

- Location within Cambridgeshire
- Population: 136; 155 (2011)
- OS grid reference: TL354632
- District: South Cambridgeshire
- Shire county: Cambridgeshire
- Region: East
- Country: England
- Sovereign state: United Kingdom
- Post town: CAMBRIDGE
- Postcode district: CB23
- Dialling code: 01954

Lolworth is a small village and civil parish in the district of South Cambridgeshire, in the county of Cambridgeshire, England, located approximately 8 miles (13 km) northwest of Cambridge city centre.

The Prime Meridian passes through the village, around just 50 metres (160 ft) to the west of the crossroads in the centre.

== History ==
Lolworth is a small village and parish, covering only 449 hectares (1,110 acres). It owes its position to the Via Devana, the Roman road running from Cambridge to Huntingdon that became a turnpike between 1772 and 1876.

In the early Middle Ages the village was well populated for its size, with 154 adults registered for the poll tax of 1377. However, the population declined sharply after that, perhaps due to a devastating fire caused by a thunderstorm of September 1393. By 1524 there were only 17 taxpayers, and the 17 families comprising 90 people listed in 1728 occupied only six buildings. The population reached a peak of 170 in 1871, and has been relatively steady at around 130 since 1961.

The celebrated 19th-century missionary Henry Martyn served in Lolworth, which was his first parish from 1803 to 1805 while he was a curate under Charles Simeon at Holy Trinity Church, Cambridge, before setting out for India and present-day Iran and Turkey.

Listed as Lollesworthe in 1034 and Lolesuuorde in the Domesday Book of 1086, the village's name means "Enclosure of a man called Loll".

== Church ==
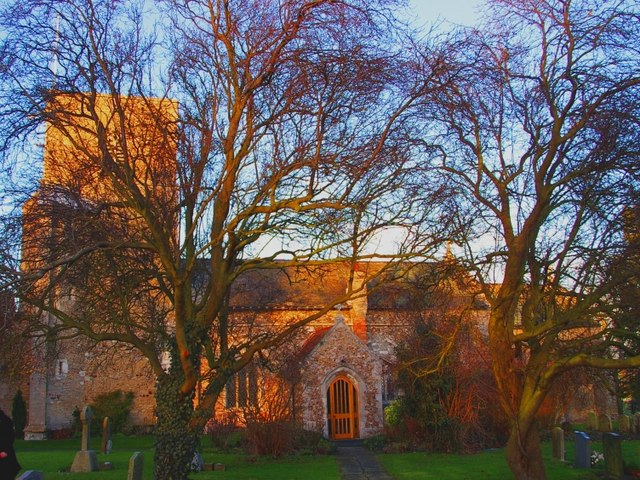
All Saints' Church

There has been a church on the site since at least the 13th century, but the present church probably dates from just prior to its rededication in 1406, with the tower added later. This leads to the theory that the great fire of 1393 destroyed the existing church, as little that pre-dates the fire survives. Dedicated to All Saints, the building comprises a chancel, a nave with south porch, and a three-storey west tower.

== Village life ==
The village is too small to warrant amenities other than its church. In 1960, a local resident, T. B. Robinson, bought the former school from the county council and gave it for use as a village hall, which was then named after him. Lolworth has no public house, but did have one alehouse, The Three Horseshoes, between the 1760s and 1798. It also had a small post office run from the front of a resident's house, but this closed in the early 21st century.

Lolworth borders Bar Hill to the south, which is accessible by a path through the field. To the north lies Swavesey, where most of the children go to their secondary school. Boxworth is to the west of the village and Childerley to the south.

== Transport ==
The village was previously only accessible via the A14 between Cambridge towards Huntingdon. However since the upgrade works to the A14 the village has become accessible from the single-carriageway A1307.

== In popular culture ==
Lolworth's church features in the 1990 short story "The Fenstanton Witch" by M. R. James.
