= Dry Drayton =

Village in Cambridgeshire, England

Coordinates: 52.23896°N 0.02145°E

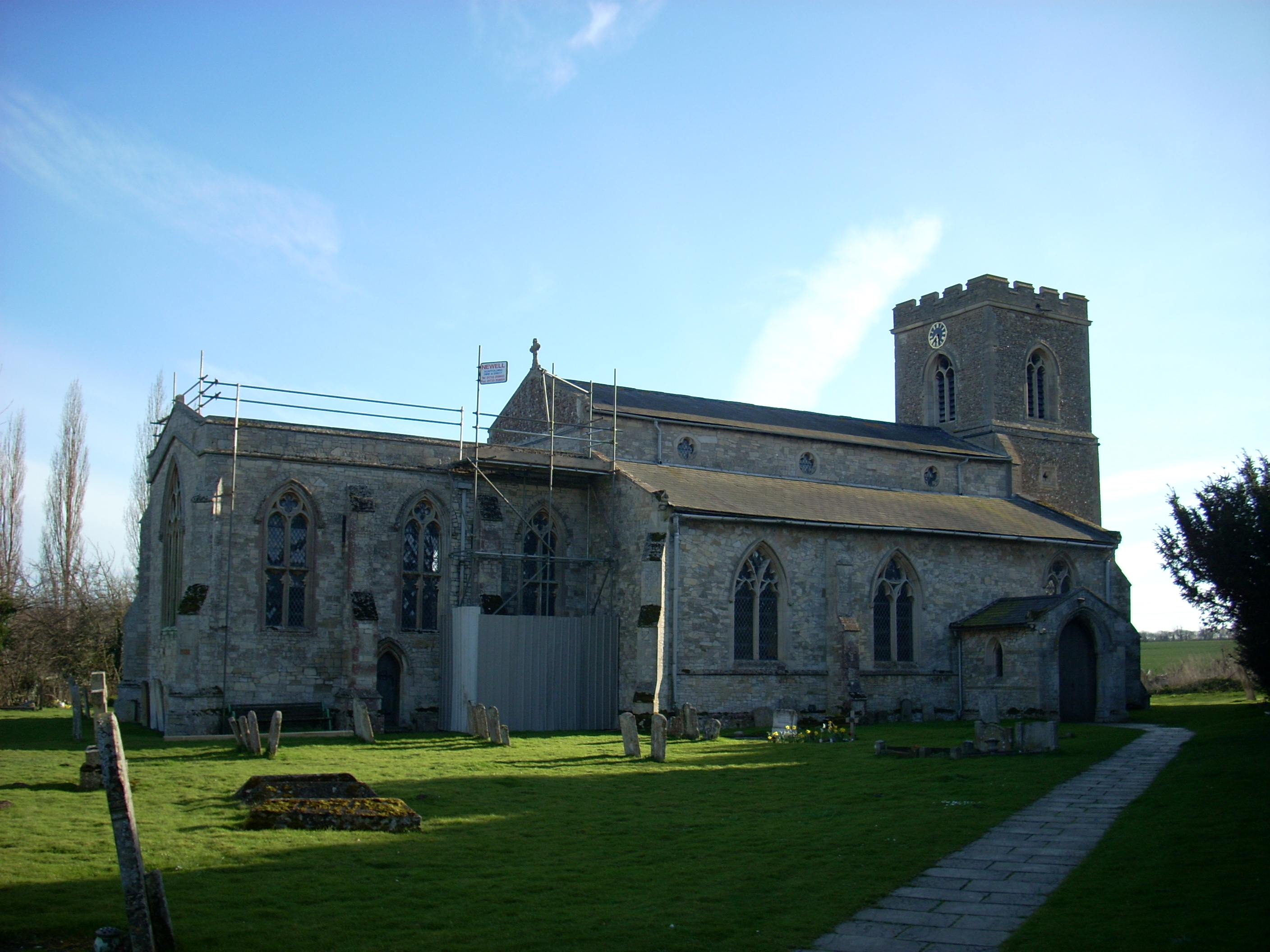
- Church of SS Peter and Paul

- Location within Cambridgeshire
- Population: 582; 643 (2011 Census)
- OS grid reference: TL381620
- District: South Cambridgeshire
- Shire county: Cambridgeshire
- Region: East
- Country: England
- Sovereign state: United Kingdom
- Post town: CAMBRIDGE
- Postcode district: CB23
- Dialling code: 01954
- Police: Cambridgeshire
- Fire: Cambridgeshire
- Ambulance: East of England
- UK Parliament: South Cambridgeshire
- Website: http://www.drydrayton.net

Dry Drayton is a village and civil parish about 5 miles (8 km) northwest of Cambridge in Cambridgeshire, England, listed as Draitone in the Domesday Book in 1086. It covers an area of 829 hectares (2,049 acres).

== History ==
The ancient parish of Dry Drayton formed between the Roman Via Devana (now the A14) to the north, and the Cambridge to St Neot's road to the south, covering an area of 2421 acres. In 1966 around 350 acres were removed from the north west of the parish to create the new civil parish of Bar Hill. Now completely cleared of ancient woodland, the village has been used for arable farming for centuries.

Listed as Draitone in the Domesday Book, the village became known as Dry Drayton by the start of the 13th century to distinguish it from Fen Drayton (5 miles to the north west) and the fact that it was susceptible to times of drought. The name "Drayton" means "farmstead where drays or sledges are used".

== Church ==
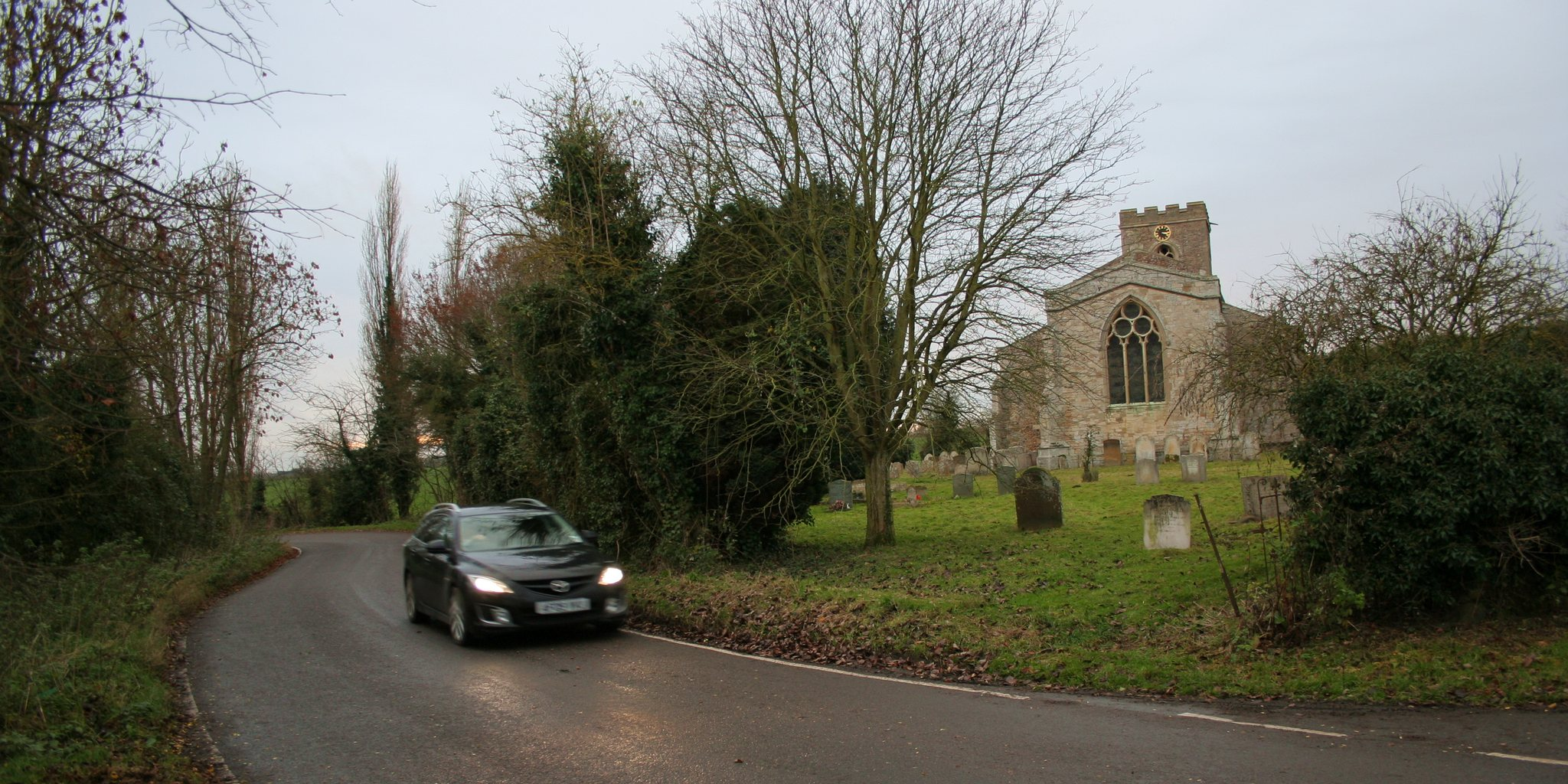
Dry Drayton church

The parish church in the village has been dedicated to St Peter and St Paul since the 15th century. The building dates from the 13th century, and consists of a chancel, an aisled and clerestoried nave with north porch, and a three-storey west tower. The tower is the oldest part of the present building and dates from the 13th century, as does the majority of the chancel and nave, though the church was restored in the 19th century. The plain octagonal font dates from the 13th century.

== Village life ==
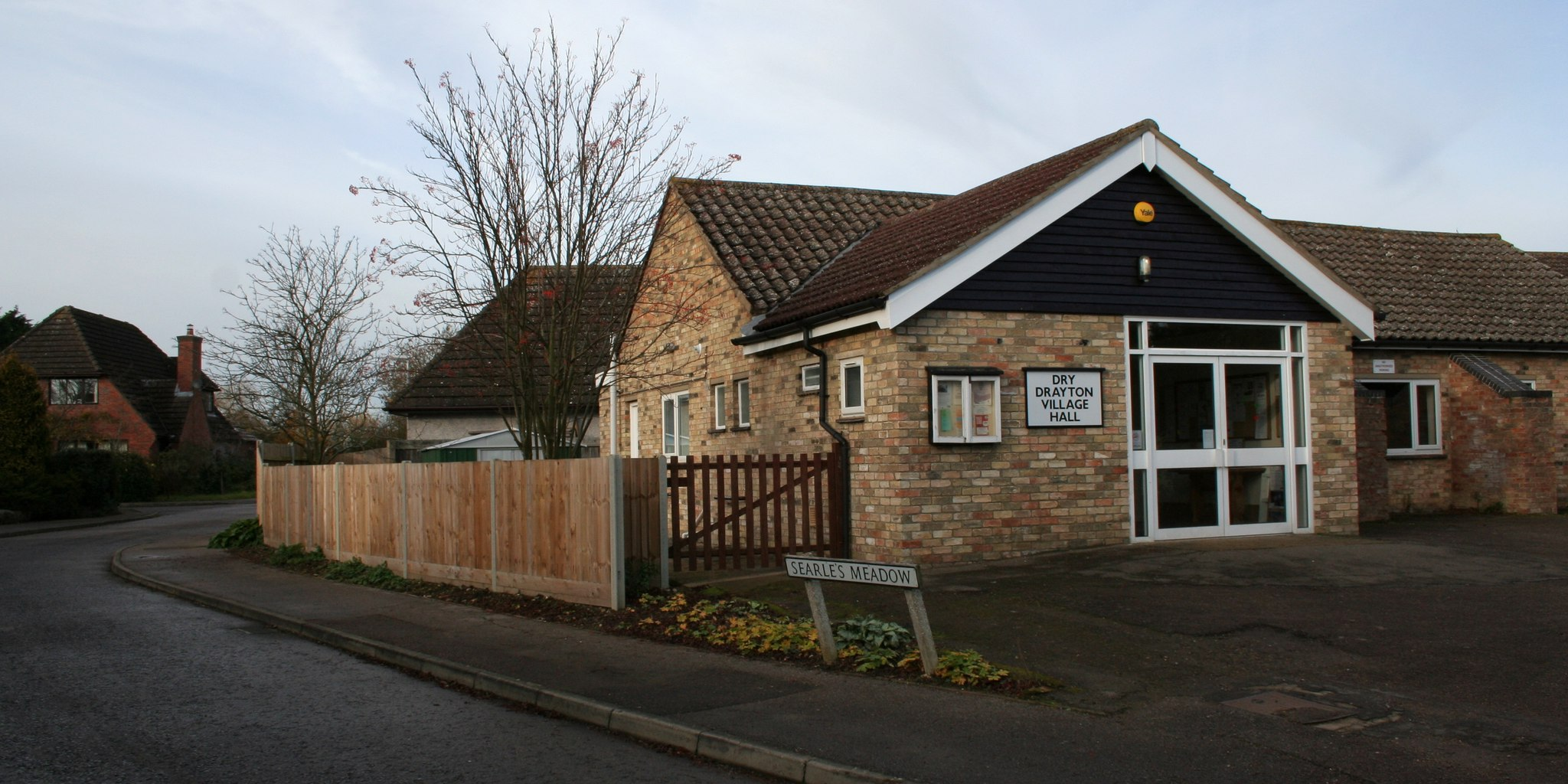
Dry Drayton village hall

Dry Drayton has an Anglican church, a Methodist church, a primary school and a cricket ground.

The village has one remaining public house, The Black Horse, that opened around 1780. Former pubs include the Three Horseshoes, that opened in the mid-18th century and closed in the mid-20th century. Away from the village was the Five Bells, that opened in the early 19th century where the Oakington road met the Huntingdon turnpike (now the A14). It became a farmhouse in the first decades of the 20th century.

The village High Street once was the main focus of the village but with expansion the focus has moved towards the area closer to the field called 'The Park', despite not being a play park or recreational area. Most of the village services and shops closed following the opening of the Tesco superstore in Bar Hill.

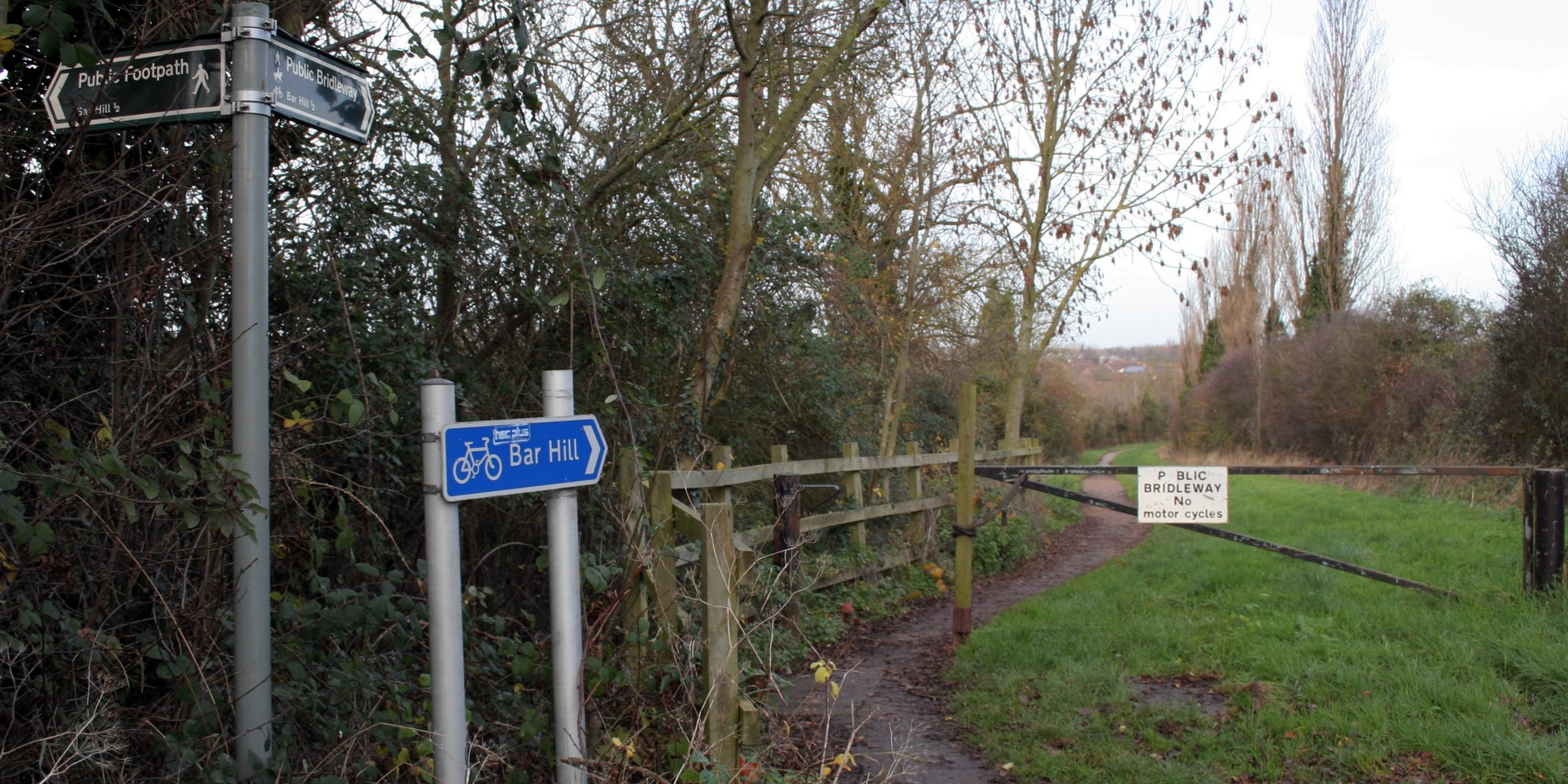
Dry Drayton entrance to The Drift

Dry Drayton is connected to Bar Hill by a cycle path and pedestrian path known as "The Drift". There is currently a campaign to improve the cycling facilities between Bar Hill, Dry Drayton, Madingley and Cambridge by providing an off-road cycle track. www.bhddmadcycle.com

Dry Drayton has two parts. Scotland Farm is a small industrial district, mainly owned by P.X Farms covering about half of the industrial part. The other half is slightly more commercial, having small family-owned businesses, and extracurricular clubs. The main part of Dry Drayton is residential, also owning a cricket club, called St. Giles Cricket Club, on Park Street, not to be confused with Chalfont St Giles, having a cricket club with the same name.

== Nearby villages ==
- Oakington to the northeast
- Hardwick to the south
- Madingley to the southeast
- Bar Hill to the north
