= The Fenstanton Witch =

- Short story by M. R. James
- Country: England
- Language: English
- Genre: Short story

Publication
- Published in: Ghosts & Scholars
- Media type: Print, magazine
- Publication date: 1990

"The Fenstanton Witch" is a short story by the English writer M. R. James. Believed to have been written in the 1920s, it was first published in the literary magazine Ghosts & Scholars in 1990. Set in Cambridgeshire in the early eighteenth century, the story concerns black magic. A radio play based on James' outline of the story, "Turn, Turn, Turn", aired on BBC Radio 4 in 1977.

== Plot summary ==
The story takes place one October during the 1702–1714 reign of Anne, Queen of Great Britain. (Note: S. T. Joshi notes that a reference to John Newborough being headmaster of Eton College would place the story somewhat earlier. Rosemary Pardoe notes various points that would imply the story takes place before or after Anne's reign.) at King's College, Cambridge. One afternoon, Senior Fellows Mr. Bates and Mr. Glynne discuss an event that recently took place at the nearby village of Fenstanton. An old woman, Mother Gibson, has died after being accused of being a witch and subjected to a ducking stool, and has been buried on the north side of Fenstanton's church. (Note: The north side of a church was "Traditionally the 'Devil's side' of the church, where evil-doers were buried".) Glynne recalls seeing Mother Gibson, who had eyes "as red as blood and the pupils like a goat's." The conversation is overheard by two other Fellows, Nicholas Hardman and Stephen Ashe, who quietly depart.

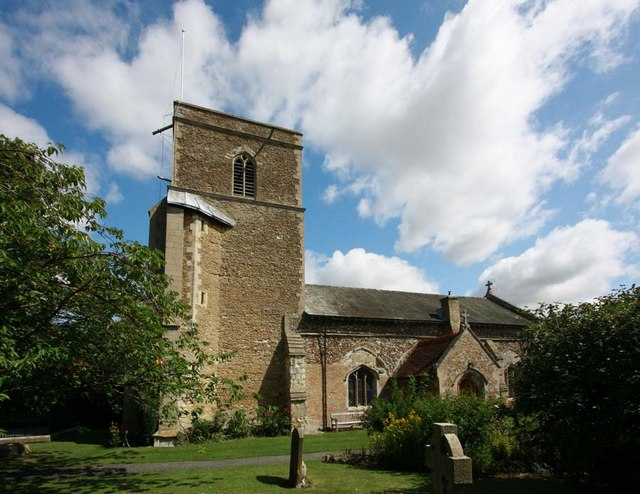
All Saints Church in Lolworth

That night, Ashe and Hardman leave King's College, telling the porter they will not be back till the next day, and take Huntingdon Road towards Fenstanton. After Ashe expresses fears about the "gentry", Hardman dismisses his concerns, saying "...do you think a circle is broken so easily? Have I nothing here that avails to make them give back?" and adding "But what we would have is not what they want. If we get the three locks of hair and the winding sheet, we are masters of the Elementals. The others want the soul."

As Ashe and Hardman approach Lolworth, they see that a night-time funeral is taking place. As they pass the church, a group of people emerge from the lane leading to the church, with seven people clustered around a captive. The captive man at the centre of the group appears terrified and hopeless; Ashe and Hardman cannot discern the faces of the captors. After the group has passed, Ashe and Hardman – knowing the mourners at the funeral would not have been able to see the procession – each think to themselves that "...it is not always well for those whose eyes are opened. It may happen to some to see the mountains full of bones and chariots of fire, but to others are shown very different sights from that."

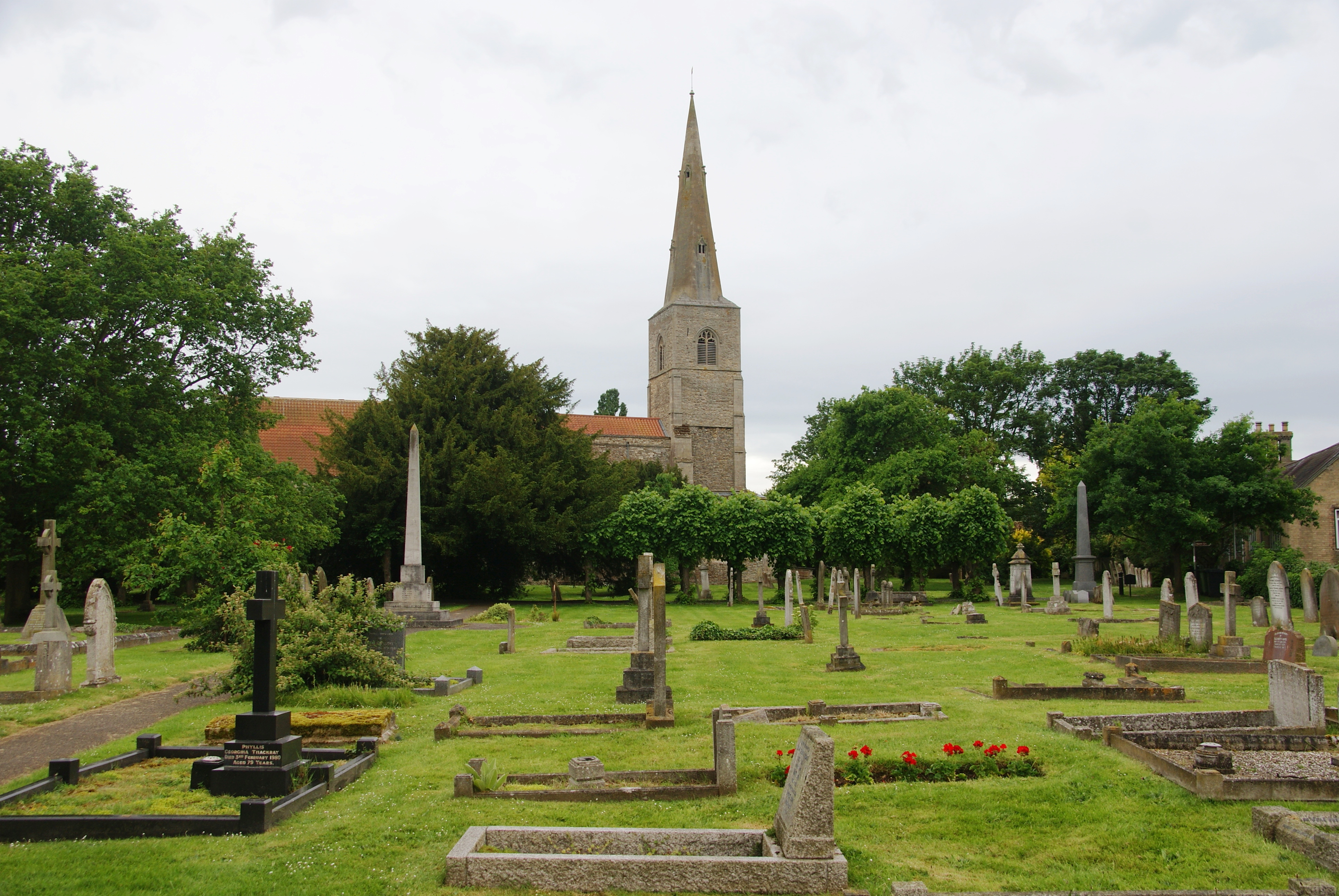
The churchyard of Fenstanton Parish Church

Arriving at Fenstanton churchyard, Ashe and Hardman "go through the sinister rites and ceremonies which were to safeguard them against those powers with whom they supposed themselves to be leagued, for they are treacherous allies". On the grass to the north side of the church, close to a newly dug grave, they draw two concentric circles, between which they draw planetary symbols and write Hebrew letters symbolising "names of angels and of the Great Power". The omniscient narrator discloses that Ashe and Hardman are "earnest and credulous students of art magic" who plans to speak words that will compel the corpse of Mother Gibson to rise from the grave and give them locks of her hair and part of her shroud, which they will then use as ingredients for spells to "command the forces of nature".

At midnight, the two men stand within the circles and Hardman begins reading a Latin conjuration. As Hardman begins to read Psalm 91, a figure resembling "an enormous bat, with folded wings and hints of head approaching the human form" and eyes like "dusky red fire" is seen perched on Mother Gibson's grave. After Ashe faints, the creature enters the circle – "not flinching for an instant at angelic names or planetary symbols" – and slashes Hardman's face with its talons.

The next morning, Ashe helps the blinded Hardman back to King's College. The two men "register a solemn abjuration of all unlawful acts in the practicing of which they had grievously transgressed", and the Senior Fellows and Provost agree to keep the matter a secret. Ashe and Hardman move to Willoughton, where Ashe cares for Hardman until dying 20 years later.

== Publication ==
"The Fenstanton Witch" was not published in James' lifetime. The date of authorship is unknown but is believed to be in the 1920s; the story outline is mentioned in James' 1929 essay "Stories I Have Tried to Write". The original manuscript was deposited in Cambridge University Library (reference. CUL Add.7484.1.27, 28b). In 1990 (54 years after James' death), it was transcribed by Rosemary Pardoe and Darroll Pardoe and published in issue 12 of Ghosts & Scholars. It has since been included in several collections and anthologies, including The Fenstanton Witch and Others in 1999. The original manuscript was untitled; the title "The Fenstanton Witch" was chosen by the Pardoes.

== Reception ==
S. T. Joshi describes "The Fenstanton Witch" as "a substantial work that richly evokes the early eighteenth-century ambience of Cambridge" but states "...its historical details are contradictory, and would probably have been corrected if [James] had polished the story." M. W. Rowe writes that the story combines "[James'] love of Oxbridge and the late seventeenth or early eighteenth century."

== Adaptations ==
On 3 March 1977, a radio play by Sheila Hodgson titled "Turn, Turn, Turn" – inspired by the outline of "The Fenstanton Witch" in James' 1929 essay "Stories I Have Tried to Write" and starring David March as M. R. James – aired on BBC Radio 4 as part of its Afternoon Theatre programme. Hodgson adapted the radio play into a short story titled "The Turning Point" which was published in Blackwood's Magazine in March 1978.
