= 2018 Huntingdonshire District Council election =

2018 UK local government election

- 3 May 2018

All 52 seats to Huntingdonshire District Council 27 seats needed for a majority

	First party	Second party	Third party
Party	Conservative	Liberal Democrats	St. Neots Ind.
Last election	34 seats	6 seats	4 seats
Seats before	34	6	3
Seats won	30	7	6
Seat change	▼5	▲1	▲2
Popular vote	21,315	9,268	2,515
Percentage	45.2%	19.7%	5.3%
	Fourth party	Fifth party	Sixth party
Party	Independent	Labour	UKIP
Last election	2 seats	2 seats	3 seats
Seats before	4	2	3
Seats won	5	4	0
Seat change	▲3	▲2	▼3
Popular vote	3,220	8,336	2,376
Percentage	6.8%	17.7%	5.0%
- Map of the results
Leader before election
Graham Bull
Conservative
Leader after election
Graham Bull
Conservative

The 2018 Huntingdonshire District Council election took place on 3 May 2018 to elect members of Huntingdonshire District Council in England. This was on the same day as other local elections.

== Previous composition ==
=== 2016 election ===
Party	Seats
Conservative	34
Liberal Democrats	6
St. Neots Ind.	4
UKIP	3
Labour	2
Independent	2
Ind. Conservative	1
Total	52

=== Composition of council seats before election ===
Party	Seats
Conservative	34
Liberal Democrat	6
HDC Independent Group	5
UKIP	3
Labour	2
Independent	2
Total	52

=== Changes between elections ===
In between the 2016 election and the 2018 election, the following council seats changed hands:

Division	Date	Previous Party	New Party	Cause	Resulting Council Composition						
Division	Date	Previous Party	New Party	Cause	Con	LDem	SNI	UKIP	Lab	Ind	IndC
Huntingdon West	Between May and October 2016	Conservative	Independent	Councillor quit party to sit as an independent member.	33	6	4	3	2	2	1
St Neots Priory Park	Between May and October 2016	Ind. Conservative	Independent	Councillor joins HDC Independent Group	33	6	4	3	2	3	0
St Neots Eaton Ford	4 May 2017	Conservative	St. Neots Ind.	Conservative incumbent resigned. St. Neots Independents won by-election.	32	6	5	3	2	3	0
St Neots Eynesbury	Between November 2017 and April 2018	St. Neots Ind.	Conservative	Sitting councillor joined Conservatives.	33	6	4	3	2	3	0
St Neots Eaton Ford	Between November 2017 and April 2018	St. Neots Ind.	Conservative	Sitting councillor joined Conservatives.	34	6	3	3	2	3	0

== Summary ==
=== Election result ===
2018 Huntingdonshire District Council election
Party	Candidates	Seats	Gains	Losses	Net gain/loss	Seats %	Votes %	Votes	+/−
Conservative	51	30	4	8	▼4	57.69	45.22	21,315	
Liberal Democrats	29	7	1	0	▲1	13.46	19.66	9,268	
St. Neots Ind.	6	6	2	0	▲2	11.54	5.34	2,515	
Independent	7	5	4	1	▲3	9.62	6.83	3,220	
Labour	39	4	2	0	▲2	7.69	17.69	8,336	
UKIP	15	0	0	3	▼3	–	5.04	2,376	
Green	1	0	0	0	Steady	–	0.21	100	
Total	148	52						47,130	

Popular vote
Conservative	45.23%
Liberal Democrats	19.66%
Labour	17.69%
Independent	6.83%
St. Neots Ind	5.34%
UKIP	5.04%
Green	0.21%

Council seats
Conservative	57.69%
Liberal Democrats	13.46%
Independent	11.54%
St. Neots Ind	9.62%
Labour	7.69%

=== Election of Group Leaders ===
Graham Bull (Warboys) was re-elected leader of the Conservative Group with Ryan Fuller (St Ives West) re-elected as the deputy leader, Barry Chapman (St Neots Priory Park and Little Paxton) was re-elected leader of the Independent Group with Tom Sanderson (The Stukeleys) re-elected as the deputy leader, Sarah Conboy (Godmanchester and Hemingford Abbots) was re-elected leader of the Lib Dem Group and Patrick Kadewere (Huntingdon North) was re-elected leader of the Labour Group with Nik Johnson (St Neots East) as the deputy leader.

Chapman was replaced Sanderson by November 2018 with Sally Smith (The Stukeleys) as his deputy.

=== Election of Leader of the Council ===
Graham Bull the leader of the conservative group was duly elected leader of the council and formed a conservative administration.

== Ward results ==
- "*": Incumbent Councilor
- "†": Former Councilor

=== Alconbury ===
Alconbury
Party	Candidate	Votes	%
Conservative	Jim White *	651	61.2
Liberal Democrats	Jonathan Young	213	20.0
Green	Tom MacLennan	100	9.4
Labour	David Brown	99	9.3
Majority		438	41.2
Turnout		1,065	36.7
Registered electors		2,906	
Conservative win (new seat)			

=== Brampton ===
Brampton (2)
Party	Candidate	Votes	%	±%
Liberal Democrats	Patricia Jordan *	987	52.5	
Liberal Democrats	John Morris *	975		
Conservative	Jane King	665	35.4	
Conservative	Bill Sinclair	582		
Labour	Rob Gardiner	227	12.1	
Majority		322	17.1	
Turnout		1,930	38.7	
Registered electors		4,994		
Liberal Democrats win (new boundaries)				
Liberal Democrats win (new boundaries)				

=== Buckden ===
Buckden
Party	Candidate	Votes	%	±%
Conservative	Hamish Masson	517	51.8	
Liberal Democrats	Peter Emeleus	481	48.2	
Majority		36	3.6	
Turnout		1,009	38.2	
Registered electors		2,641		
Conservative win (new boundaries)				

=== Fenstanton ===
Fenstanton
Party	Candidate	Votes	%	±%
Conservative	David Mead *	608	60.8	
Labour	Rob Leach	206	20.6	
Liberal Democrats	Colin Saunderson †	186	18.6	
Majority		402	40.2	
Turnout		1,010	34.6	
Registered electors		2,923		
Conservative win (new boundaries)				

=== Godmanchester and Hemingford Abbots ===
Godmanchester and Hemingford Abbots (3)
Party	Candidate	Votes	%
Liberal Democrats	Sarah Conboy *	1,396	51.9
Liberal Democrats	David Underwood *	1,150	
Liberal Democrats	Mike Grice	1,030	
Conservative	Sarah Smith	911	33.9
Conservative	Keith Stukins	654	
Conservative	Tom Young	627	
Labour	Samuel Sweek	383	14.2
Majority		485	18.0
Turnout		2,323	34.3
Registered electors		6,771	
Liberal Democrats win (new seat)			
Liberal Democrats win (new seat)			
Liberal Democrats win (new seat)			

=== Great Paxton ===
Great Paxton
Party	Candidate	Votes	%
Conservative	Richard West *	699	69.6
Labour	Matthew Machin	155	15.4
Liberal Democrats	Lesley Werb	150	14.9
Majority		544	54.2
Turnout		1,008	39.8
Registered electors		2,531	
Conservative win (new seat)			

=== Great Staughton ===
Great Staughton
Party	Candidate	Votes	%
Conservative	Darren Tysoe *	741	62.7
Liberal Democrats	Nick Farnden	440	37.3
Majority		301	25.4
Turnout		1,195	44.8
Registered electors		2,668	
Conservative win (new seat)			

=== Hemingford Grey and Houghton ===
Hemingford Grey and Houghton (2)
Party	Candidate	Votes	%
Conservative	Doug Dew *	1,011	61.0
Conservative	David Keane	902	
Liberal Democrats	David Priestman	382	23.0
Liberal Democrats	Sue Clark	342	
Labour	Kim Loader	265	16.0
Majority		629	37.9
Turnout		1,613	34.0
Registered electors		4,738	
Conservative win (new seat)			
Conservative win (new seat)			

=== Holywell-cum-Needingworth ===
Holywell-cum-Needingworth (2)
Party	Candidate	Votes	%
Conservative	Jon Neish	1,066	48.7
Conservative	Lewis Besley	1,008	
Liberal Democrats	Louise Reay	522	23.9
Labour	Richard Allen	398	18.2
Labour	Marie Baker	356	
UKIP	Jean Harlow	202	9.2
UKIP	Jules Grange	138	
Majority		544	24.9
Turnout		2,021	36.5
Registered electors		5,532	
Conservative win (new seat)			
Conservative win (new seat)			

=== Huntingdon East ===
Huntingdon East (2)
Party	Candidate	Votes	%	±%
Liberal Democrats	Mike Humphrey	896	47.1	
Liberal Democrats	Trish Shrapnel †	749		
Conservative	Jay Dyne	744	39.1	
Conservative	Tom Varghese	626		
Labour	Marion Kadewere	264	13.9	
Labour	Emily Jolley	256		
Majority		152	8.0	
Turnout		1,854	35.4	
Registered electors		5,245		
Liberal Democrats win (new boundaries)				
Liberal Democrats win (new boundaries)				

=== Huntingdon North ===
Huntingdon North (3)
Party	Candidate	Votes	%	±%
Labour	Patrick Kadewere *	1,011	43.2	
Labour	Sam Wakeford	923		
Labour	Anita Diaz	843		
Conservative	Peter Brown	723	30.9	
Conservative	Alan MacKender-Lawrence	665		
Conservative	Richard Valatka	574		
Liberal Democrats	Lakkana Yalagala	354	15.1	
UKIP	Peter Ashcroft	251	10.7	
UKIP	Derek Norman	221		
UKIP	Shirley Reeve	174		
Majority		288	12.3	
Turnout		2,151	25.7	
Registered electors		8,375		
Labour win (new boundaries)				
Labour win (new boundaries)				
Labour win (new boundaries)				

=== Kimbolton ===
Kimbolton
Party	Candidate	Votes	%
Conservative	Jonathan Gray *	953	86.2
Labour	Ann Beevor	153	13.8
Majority		800	72.4
Turnout		1,117	42.3
Registered electors		2,640	
Conservative win (new seat)			

=== Ramsey ===
Ramsey
Party	Candidate	Votes	%	±%
Conservative	Steve Corney	1,417	45.4	
Conservative	John Palmer *	1,367		
Conservative	Jeff Clarke	1,355		
UKIP	Peter Reeve *	1,005	32.2	
UKIP	Colin Stevens	543		
UKIP	Michael Mean	529		
Labour	Kevin Minnette	382	12.2	
Labour	Iain Ramsbottom	322		
Liberal Democrats	Dan Breen	320	10.2	
Labour	Kevin Goddard	297		
Majority		412	13.2	
Turnout		2,797	35.1	
Registered electors		7,961		
Conservative win (new boundaries)				
Conservative win (new boundaries)				
Conservative win (new boundaries)				

=== Sawtry ===
Sawtry
Party	Candidate	Votes	%	±%
Conservative	Simon Bywater	969	44.3	
Independent	Dick Tuplin *	707	32.4	
Independent	Delia Riddle	216	9.9	
Labour	Michael Burn	162	7.4	
Labour	John Palmer	143		
Liberal Democrats	Elke Smith	131	6.0	
Majority		262	12.0	
Turnout		1,487	30.4	
Registered electors		4,892		
Conservative win (new boundaries)				
Independent win (new boundaries)				

=== Somersham ===
Somersham
Party	Candidate	Votes	%	±%
Conservative	Steve Criswell *	558	58.6	
Labour	Alan Hunter	176	18.5	
Liberal Democrats	Tony Hulme	148	15.5	
UKIP	Dianna Skeggs	70	7.4	
Majority		382	40.1	
Turnout		956	32.2	
Registered electors		2,966		
Conservative win (new boundaries)				

=== St Ives East ===
St Ives East (2)
Party	Candidate	Votes	%	±%
Conservative	Richard Bellamy	766	45.8	
Conservative	Jason Ablewhite *	758		
Labour	Sam Feeney	492	29.4	
Liberal Democrats	Tony Jebson	414	24.8	
Majority		274	16.4	
Turnout		1,470	28.8	
Registered electors		5,101		
Conservative win (new boundaries)				
Conservative win (new boundaries)				

=== St Ives South ===
St Ives South (2)
Party	Candidate	Votes	%	±%
Conservative	John Davies *	1,041	44.5	
Conservative	Angie Dickinson *	946		
Labour	Paula Dean	761	32.6	
Liberal Democrats	Nicholas Wells	535	22.9	
Liberal Democrats	Malcolm Lynn	369		
Majority		280	12.0	
Turnout		2,178	37.6	
Registered electors		5,801		
Conservative win (new boundaries)				
Conservative win (new boundaries)				

=== St Ives West ===
St Ives West
Party	Candidate	Votes	%	±%
Conservative	Ryan Fuller *	461	58.0	
Labour	Mick White	199	25.0	
Liberal Democrats	Joe Jordan	135	17.0	
Majority		362	33.0	
Turnout		807	35.0	
Registered electors		2,307		
Conservative win (new boundaries)				

=== St Neots East ===
St Neots East (2)
Party	Candidate	Votes	%
Labour	Nik Johnson	345	40.4
Conservative	David Wells	273	32.0
Liberal Democrats	James Catmur	235	27.5
Conservative	Ian Gardener *	193	
Labour	Nigel Pauley	186	
Majority		72	8.4
Turnout		686	28.8
Registered electors		2,381	
Labour win (new seat)			
Conservative win (new seat)			

=== St Neots Eaton ===
St Neots Eaton
Party	Candidate	Votes	%
St. Neots Ind.	Derek Giles *	1,552	52.0
St. Neots Ind.	Sandra Giles *	1,449	
St. Neots Ind.	Colin Maslen	1,291	
Conservative	Charles Bober *	841	28.2
Conservative	Andy Jennings	746	
Conservative	James Corley *	662	
Labour	Celia Emery	367	12.3
Labour	David Cole	328	
Liberal Democrats	Nicholas Thompson	224	7.5
Majority		711	23.8
Turnout		2,681	
Registered electors		8,541	
St. Neots Ind. win (new seat)			
St. Neots Ind. win (new seat)			
St. Neots Ind. win (new seat)			

=== St Neots Eynesbury ===
St Neots Eynesbury (3)
Party	Candidate	Votes	%	±%
St. Neots Ind.	Justin Cooper-Marsh	963	39.9	
St. Neots Ind.	Doug Terry	854		
St. Neots Ind.	Barry Banks	765		
Conservative	Adrian Usher	700	29.0	
Conservative	Rob Moores	667		
Conservative	Karl Wainwright *	665		
Labour	Anthony McNeill	462	19.1	
Labour	Dan Ridge	399		
Liberal Democrats	Claire Piper	291	12.0	
Majority		263	10.9	
Turnout		2,157	23.7	
Registered electors		9,099		
St. Neots Ind. win (new boundaries)				
St. Neots Ind. win (new boundaries)				
St. Neots Ind. win (new boundaries)				

=== St Neots Priory Park and Little Paxton ===
St Neots Priory Park and Little Paxton (3)
Party	Candidate	Votes	%
Independent	Barry Chapman *	1,454	40.4
Conservative	Philip Gaskin	956	26.6
Conservative	Keith Prentice	875	
Liberal Democrats	Carol McMahon	681	18.9
Conservative	Laurence Swain *	642	
Liberal Democrats	James Bartrick	586	
Labour	Saul Jeavons	507	14.1
Labour	Colin Gunter	459	
Majority		498	13.8
Turnout		2,603	32.8
Registered electors		7,943	
Independent win (new seat)			
Conservative win (new seat)			
Conservative win (new seat)			

=== Stilton, Folksworth and Washingley ===
Stilton, Folksworth and Washingley (2)
Party	Candidate	Votes	%
Conservative	Tim Alban *	1,347	71.7
Conservative	Marge Beuttel	1,146	
Labour	Jonathan Orchard	342	18.2
Labour	Thelma Lomax	302	
UKIP	Roger Henson	189	10.1
UKIP	Maureen Henson	136	
Majority		1,005	53.5
Turnout		1,862	35.8
Registered electors		5,209	
Conservative win (new seat)			
Conservative win (new seat)			

=== The Stukeleys ===
The Stukeleys (3)
Party	Candidate	Votes	%
Independent	Tom Sanderson *	675	48.8
Independent	Sally Smith	505	
Independent	Shaun Burton	428	
Conservative	Martin Stephenson	356	25.7
Conservative	Stephen Cawley *	353	
Conservative	Daryl Brown *	317	
Liberal Democrats	Ethan Stone	147	10.6
Labour	Jane Hudson	138	10.0
UKIP	Paul Bullen	68	4.9
Majority		319	23.0
Turnout		1,117	33.9
Registered electors		3,293	
Independent win (new seat)			
Independent win (new seat)			
Independent win (new seat)			

=== Warboys ===
Warboys (2)
Party	Candidate	Votes	%
Conservative	Graham Bull *	1,031	64.7
Conservative	Jill Tavener *	1,020	
Labour	Angela Richards	329	20.7
Labour	David King	307	
UKIP	Robert Brown	233	14.6
UKIP	Sharna Peck	141	
Majority		702	44.1
Turnout		1,696	30.3
Registered electors		5,590	
Conservative win (new seat)			
Conservative win (new seat)			

=== Yaxley ===
Yaxley (3)
Party	Candidate	Votes	%
Conservative	Eric Butler *	1,310	51.1
Conservative	Kevin Gulson	1,194	
Conservative	Mac McGuire	926	
Labour	Graeme Watkins	513	20.0
Labour	Margaret Cochrane	511	
Labour	Roger Whiting	388	
Independent	Chelsea Meachen	384	15.0
UKIP	Paul Richardson	358	14.0
Majority		797	31.1
Turnout		2,158	25.6
Registered electors		8,441	
Conservative win (new seat)			
Conservative win (new seat)			
Conservative win (new seat)			

== By-elections ==
=== Godmanchester & Hemingford Abbots by-election ===
A by-election took place in Godmanchester and Hemingford Abbots on 1 August 2019 after the resignation of Liberal Democrat councillor David Underwood. The seat was held for the Liberal Democrats by Sarah Wilson.

Godmanchester & Hemingford Abbots by-election 1 August 2019
Party	Candidate	Votes	%	±%
Liberal Democrats	Sarah Wilson	929	48.2	–3.7
Conservative	Paula Sparling	666	34.5	+0.7
Independent	Nigel Pauley	333	17.3	New
Majority		263	13.6	–4.4
Turnout		1,936	27.9	–6.5
Registered electors		6,939		+168
Liberal Democrats hold		Swing	–2.2	

=== Alconbury by-election ===
A by-election took place in Alconbury on 12 December 2019 alongside the 2019 general election, following the resignation of Councillor Jim White. The seat was held for the Conservative Party by Ian Gardener.

Alconbury by-election 12 December 2019
Party	Candidate	Votes	%	±%
Conservative	Ian Gardener	1,255	56.7	–4.5
Liberal Democrats	Alastair Henderson-Begg	365	16.5	–3.5
Labour	Nicholas Sherratt	269	12.2	+2.8
Independent	Tom MacLennan	235	10.6	+1.2
Independent	Paul Bullen	89	3.9	New
Majority		860	39.9	–1.0
Turnout		2,233	77.9	+40.7
Registered electors		2,865		–41
Conservative hold		Swing	–0.5	

=== St Ives East by-election ===
A by-election took place in the St Ives East ward on 13 February 2020, after the resignation of Conservative Party Councillor and Cambridgeshire Police and Crime Commissioner Jason Ablewhite following his referral to the Independent Office for Police Conduct. The seat was held for the Conservative Party by Adam Roberts.

St Ives East by-election 13 February 2020
Party	Candidate	Votes	%	±%
Conservative	Adam Roberts	558	46.5	+0.7
Independent	Philip Pope	429	35.8	New
Liberal Democrats	Colin Saunderson †	109	9.1	–15.7
Labour	Barry O'Sullivan	103	8.6	–20.8
Majority		129	10.8	–5.6
Turnout		1,200	23.6	–5.2
Registered electors		5,074		–27
Conservative hold		Swing	–17.5	

=== Huntingdon North by-election ===
A by-election took place in the Huntingdon North ward on 6 May 2021 alongside the 2021 local elections. The seat was held for the Labour Party by Marion Kadewere.

Huntingdon North by-election 6 May 2021
Party	Candidate	Votes	%	±%
Labour	Marion Kadewere	902	38.5	–4.7
Conservative	Joanna Bac	799	34.1	+3.2
Liberal Democrats	Michael Shellens †	498	21.3	+6.1
UKIP	Peter Ashcroft	142	6.1	–4.7
Majority		103	4.4	–7.9
Total valid votes		2,341	27.6	–0.3
Rejected ballots		42	1.8	
Total ballots		2,383	28.1	
Registered electors		8,468		+93
Labour hold		Swing	–4.0	

=== St Ives South by-election ===
A by-election took place in the St Ives South ward on 6 May 2021 alongside the 2021 local elections, following the passing of Councillor John Davies. The seat was held for the Conservative Party by Rianna D'Souza.

St Ives South by-election 6 May 2021
Party	Candidate	Votes	%	±%
Conservative	Rianna D'Souza	970	43.0	–1.5
Liberal Democrats	Nicholas Wells	599	26.6	+3.7
Labour	Catherine Gleadow	441	19.5	–13.0
Green	John Parkin	246	10.9	New
Majority		371	16.4	+4.5
Total valid votes		2,256	37.1	–3.2
Rejected ballots		37	1.6	
Total ballots		2,293	37.7	
Registered electors		6,088		+287
Conservative hold		Swing	–2.6	

=== St Ives East by-election ===
A by-election took place in the St Ives East ward on 6 May 2021 alongside the 2021 local elections, following the resignation of Councillor Richard Bellamy. The seat was held for the Conservative Party by Craig Smith.

St Ives East by-election 6 May 2021
Party	Candidate	Votes	%	±%
Conservative	Craig Smith	824	54.9	+9.1
Labour	Angela Richards	374	24.9	–4.5
Green	Ann Barnes	302	20.1	New
Majority		450	30.0	+13.6
Turnout		1,520	29.8	–3.4
Registered electors		5,106		+5
Conservative hold		Swing	+6.8	

=== Warboys by-election ===
A by-election took place in the Warboys ward on 6 May 2021 alongside the 2021 local elections, following the passing of Councillor Jill Tavener. The seat was held for the Conservative Party by Michael Haines.

Warboys by-election 6 May 2021
Party	Candidate	Votes	%	±%
Conservative	Michael William Haines	1,235	62.7	+1.1
Liberal Democrats	Helen Kewley	382	19.4	New
Labour	Paul Joseph Williams	352	17.9	−43.0
Majority		853	43.3	−0.1
Turnout				
Registered electors				
Conservative hold		Swing		

=== St Neots East by-election ===
A by-election took place in the St Neots East ward on 8 July 2021, following the election of Dr Nik Johnson as Mayor of Cambridgeshire and Peterborough. The seat was won by Independent candidate Benjamin Pitt.

St Neots East by-election 8 July 2021
Party	Candidate	Votes	%	±%
St. Neots Ind.	Benjamin Pitt	249	42.5	New
Green	Lara Davenport-Ray	196	33.4	New
Liberal Democrats	Geoffrey Michael Seeff	68	11.6	−22.7
Conservative	Samuel D Collins	47	8.0	−20.2
Labour	Helen Mary Stroud	26	4.4	−46.0
Majority		53	9.1	
Turnout				
Registered electors				
St. Neots Ind. gain from Labour		Swing		

=== Huntingdon East by-election ===
Huntingdon East: 4 November 2021
Party	Candidate	Votes	%	±%
Liberal Democrats	Michael Shellens †	813	55.3	+8.3
Conservative	Jonas King	656	44.7	+5.6
Majority		157	10.6	
Turnout		1,476	27.8	
Registered electors				
Liberal Democrats hold		Swing	▲1.4	
