= Swavesey =

Village in Cambridgeshire, England

Coordinates: 52.2975°N 0.0°E

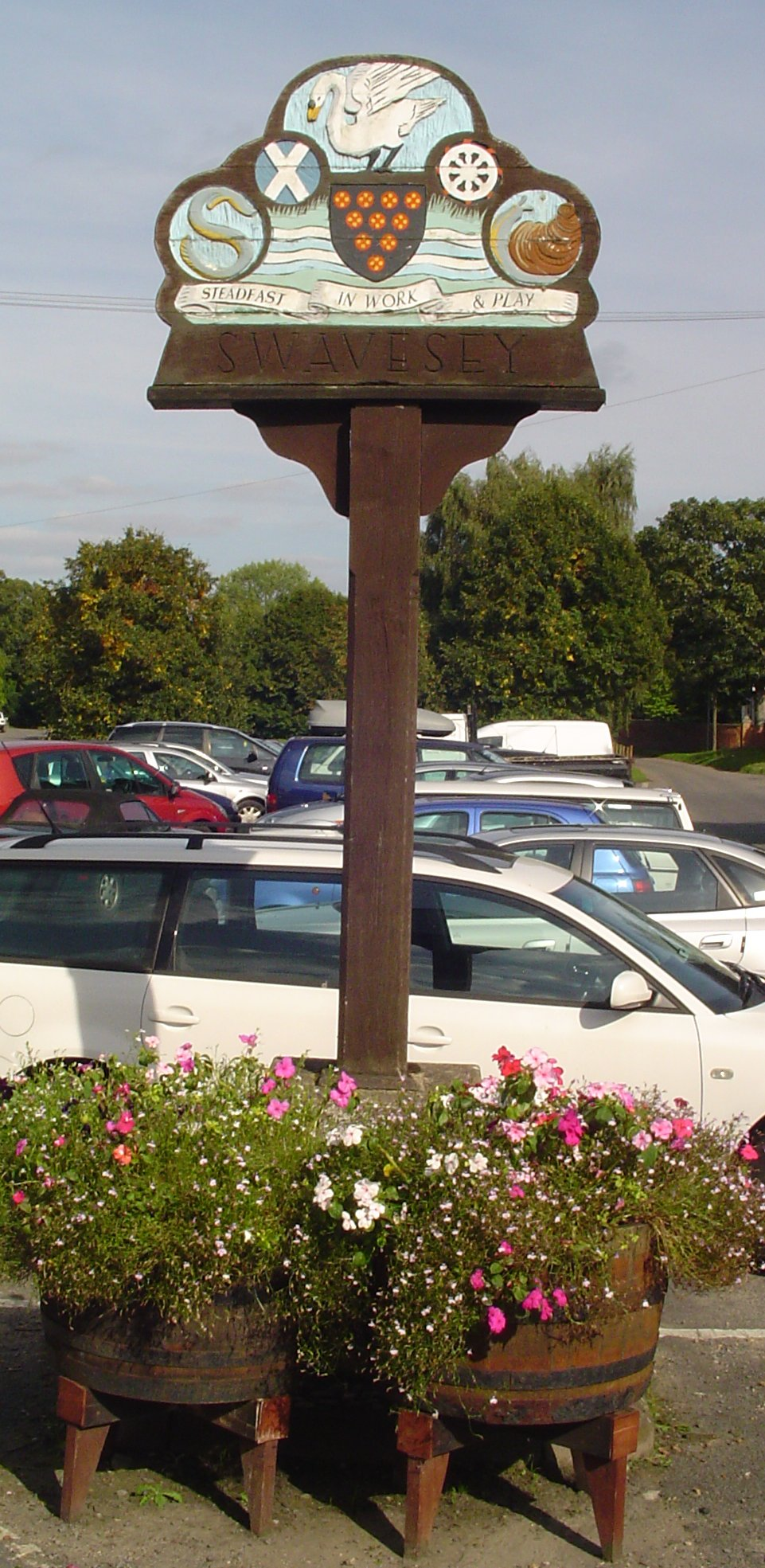
- Village sign

- Location within Cambridgeshire
- Population: 2,480 (2001 census); 2,463 (2011)
- OS grid reference: TL364684
- District: South Cambridgeshire
- Shire county: Cambridgeshire
- Region: East
- Country: England
- Sovereign state: United Kingdom
- Post town: CAMBRIDGE
- Postcode district: CB24
- Dialling code: 01954
- Police: Cambridgeshire
- Fire: Cambridgeshire
- Ambulance: East of England
- UK Parliament: South Cambridgeshire

Swavesey is a village lying on the Prime Meridian of the world in Cambridgeshire, England, with a population of 2,463. The village is situated 9 miles to the north west of Cambridge and 3 miles south east of St Ives.

Listed as Suauesye in the Domesday Book of 1086, the name Swavesey means "landing place (or island) of a man named Swaef".

== History ==
Swavesey, forming a historical parish of 3982 acres on the border with Huntingdonshire, lies on a narrow clay ridge rising to 18 metres above sea level at one time surrounded by fenland. The village was of importance during the early Middle Ages as the centre of a large 11th-century estate. A castle was built here in the late 11th or early 12th century, though is believed to have been derelict by 1200. Swavesey served as a port and subsequent market town and was fortified at the end of the 12th century.

An alien priory was founded in Swavesey shortly after the Norman Conquest, possibly replacing a Saxon minster.

Roman pottery has been found in the parish.

The village motto is "Steadfast in Work and Play".

== Church ==
There was already a church in Swavesey at the time of the Norman Conquest, possibly a minster, when Alan, Count of Richmond, granted it to the Abbey of St Sergius and St Bacchus in Angers, France. The Abbey founded an alien priory there by 1086, but Swavesey Priory was awarded to Alan la Zouche, lord of Swavesey manor, by the start of the 14th century.

The present parish church in Swavesey, dedicated to St Andrew since the 11th century, has a double aisle aspect to its nave. The east window in the Lady Chapel contains a 1967 Tree of Jesse by Francis Skeat. The present building has parts dating from the 11th century, but was substantially improved over the following four centuries.

A Unitarian chapel was built in 1831 on the corner of School Lane and High Street, and the congregation moved to a new Baptist chapel in 1869. The original Unitarian chapel was bought by a group of Methodists and served as their place of worship until it was converted into a bungalow in 1934.

Today, there are three places of worship in Swavesey: St Andrew's parish church in Station Road, the Strict and Particular Baptist Church in Middle Watch, and the Bethel Baptist Church, also in Middle Watch.

== Transport ==
The railway line from Cambridge to St Ives, which passed through Swavesey, was opened in 1847 and closed in 1970, but has reopened as the Cambridgeshire Guided Busway. The parish's north border is formed by the River Great Ouse, formerly an important transport link. The parish's south west border runs along the Via Devana, the old Roman road, that now forms the A14.

== Village life ==
Farming is the main industry in and around Swavesey, although most residents commute to work.

There were three pubs listed in the village in 1765, and eight by the early 19th century. By the late 19th century, this number had risen to 16, but had fallen back to eight by 1912, and only three by 1960. Since then the only public house in the village centre was the White Horse Inn, open since at least 1765, and adjacent to the village post office and shop, until it’s closure in 2026. Notable former pubs include the Rose and Crown, on the corner of Boxworth End and Rose and Crown Road, which was open by 1765 but closed in the 1880s. The Black Horse on the corner of High Street and Black Horse Lane served from around 1777 until 1910. The Swan, (later the Swan with Two Necks), on Station Road was open from around 1777 to 1917. The Blue Bell was active from the late 18th century until around the Second World War, and the George and Dragon also opened in the late 18th century and closed in the first years of the 20th century.

The village's post office opened in the 1850s. Swavesey has a village magazine called "The Meridian", and holds a biennial village festival. The MG Owners' Club has its UK headquarters just outside the village.

== Education ==
The village contains one primary school, Swavesey Primary School, which claims to be the only school in the United Kingdom to lie on the meridian. Swavesey Village College is a secondary school, which opened in 1958. The school provides secondary education for surrounding villages, including Over, Bar Hill, Longstanton, and Fenstanton, and uses a vertical tutor system. As with other village colleges, Swavesey's institution also provides adult education in the evenings and a myriad of extracurricular after-school clubs.
