= Bar Hill =

Village in Cambridgeshire, England

Coordinates: 52.25389°N 0.02278°E

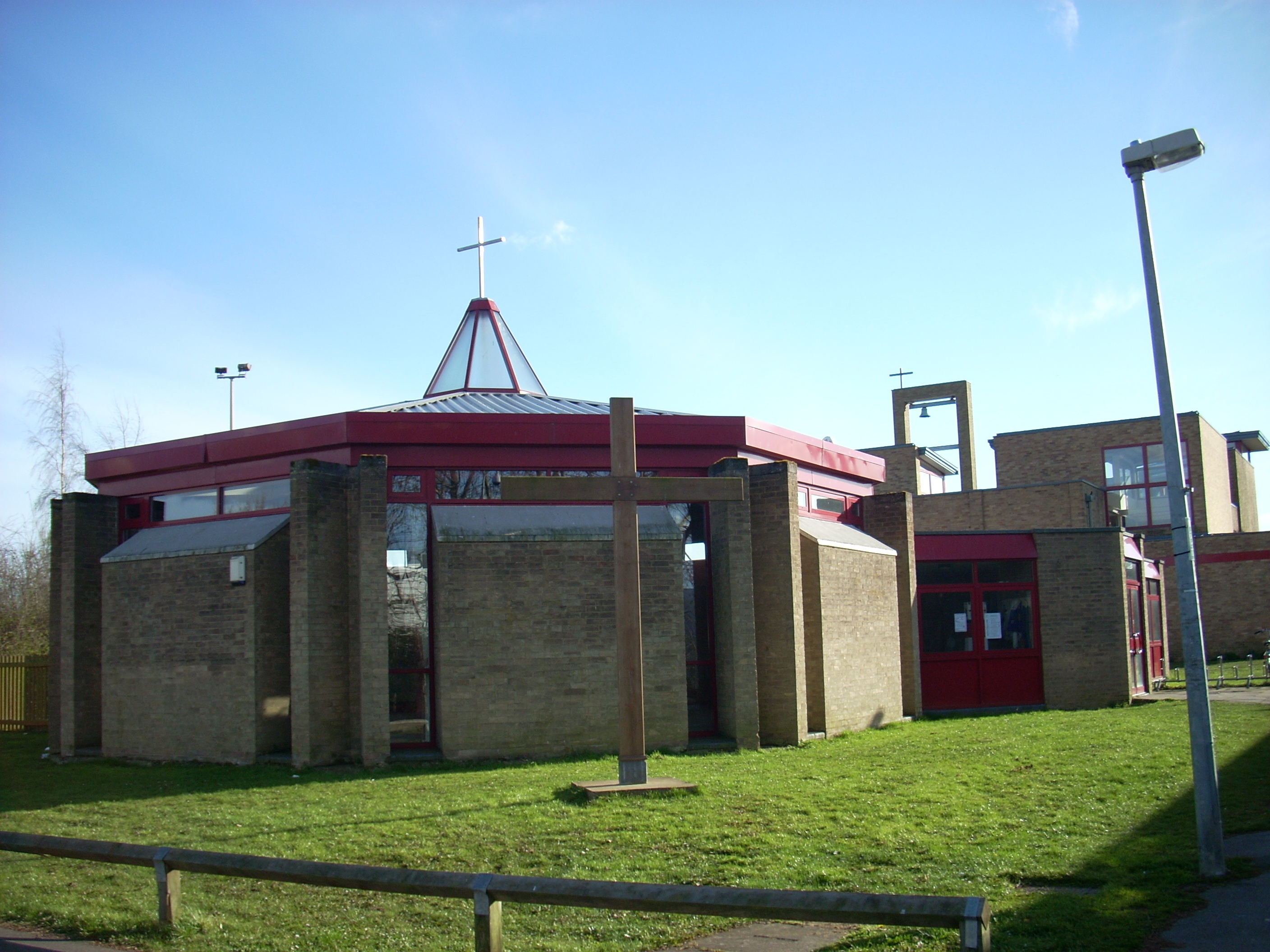
- Bar Hill Church and The Octagon in 2008

- Location within Cambridgeshire
- Population: 4,032 (2011 Census)
- OS grid reference: TL3863
- Civil parish: Bar Hill
- District: South Cambridgeshire
- Shire county: Cambridgeshire
- Region: East
- Country: England
- Sovereign state: United Kingdom
- Post town: CAMBRIDGE
- Postcode district: CB23
- Dialling code: 01954
- Police: Cambridgeshire
- Fire: Cambridgeshire
- Ambulance: East of England
- UK Parliament: St Neots and Mid Cambridgeshire

Bar Hill is a purpose-built village with a population of 4,000 about 4 miles (7 km) northwest of Cambridge, England on the A14 road, just east of the Prime Meridian.

== History ==
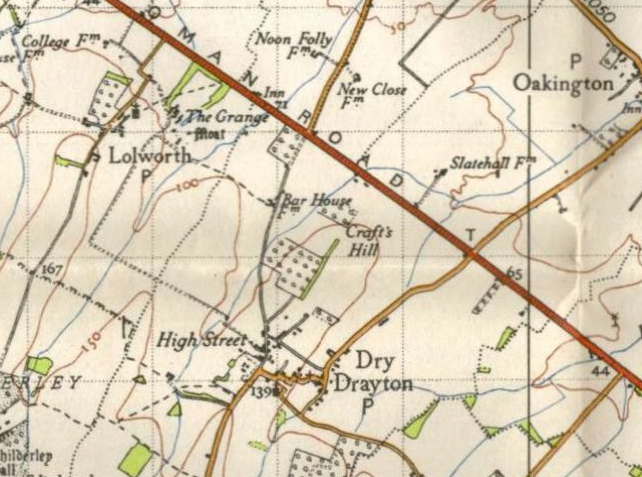
The site of Bar Hill in the late 1940s

Prior to the building of the Bar Hill settlement the area was occupied by Bar Farm, named after the toll bar that was in place along the Roman Road running immediately to the North of the site. The farm house and toll gate still remain in the village.

Planning for the village began in the late 1950s to alleviate the housing shortage in South Cambridgeshire. A 350-acre parcel of land was purchased from Chivers Ltd. in the parish of Dry Drayton in 1959, and a village was planned of a self-contained community of approximately 1,200 residences, all leasehold, located in closes on the interior of an outer ring road. In the face of opposition from nearby Cambridge City Council, the plan was approved in 1964, building work started in 1965, and the first residents arrived in May 1967. Cubitts, the original developer, sold the project to Trafalgar House in 1968 following slower than expected growth, and building work was paused for 18 months after only 180 houses had been completed. The same year a shopping mall of 14 shops, including a supermarket, was opened in the centre of the village, and a primary school was opened.

The village grew rapidly in the 1970s, including the completion of a pub, a church, and a hotel with its own golf course, and by 1975 there was a population of 1,673 in its 599 homes. The village's original supermarket closed in 1976 but was replaced in 1977 by a very large branch of Tesco, accompanied by an extensive car park. A village hall was completed in 1979, and expansion continued in the 1980s, with further transfer of land from Dry Drayton. In 1989 the final house of the original plan was completed, 23 years after the building had begun and 15 years after its planned completion. The population was at that time over 5,000.

On 8 August 2014 the village came to national prominence when over 100 millimetres (3.9 in) of rain fell in a period of approximately 30 minutes, causing many parts of the village to become flooded.

== Village life ==
The village has a shopping mall (with a large Tesco Extra supermarket as anchor store), library (in which a post office is also located), primary school, multi-denominational church (rebuilt in 1991) and a pub called The Fox. The village has 2 main playgrounds just off the Village Green with smaller equipment spread out throughout the village green spaces. There is an enclosed Astro football pitch and 2 tennis courts. A skate park was built in the village but was demolished as it became too expensive to keep up. However, a committee of residents has been established to explore the construction of a new facility. There is also a championship 18-hole golf course and hotel. The village also has two fields (one large field known to locals mostly as "The village green" and the smaller school playing field located near the farmhouse) which are used to host sporting events and council events such as the annual village fête.

Bar Hill was originally contained within a ring road when it was first developed, but with the expansion and development of the area, it began to spill out. For example the "Gleneagles" development overlooking the golf course.

The village has been supported by the Bar Hill Residents' Association since its inception in 1967 and has a long-running magazine (the Bar Hill News) which has been published eleven or twelve times a year since then.

In May 2021 a new charity, the Bar Hill Community Association, was established in the village the stated intention behind the charity is to support the village. The production of the Bar Hill News was transferred from the Residents Association to the Community Association once the setup was completed.

The history of the village was recorded by Roger Hall (the village historian) who published a book "Bar Hill - A Social History 1949 to 2001" in 2002. Following Hall's passing in April 2022, his extensive collection of documents and records was passed to the Bar Hill Community Association to manage.

In 2017, Bar Hill was one of many areas that benefitted by the A14 Cambridge to Huntingdon Improvement Scheme which was completed in 2020.

From 2023 to 2025, the Best Western Hotel, located in Bar Hill, was used by the Home Office to house a maximum of 272 asylum seekers.

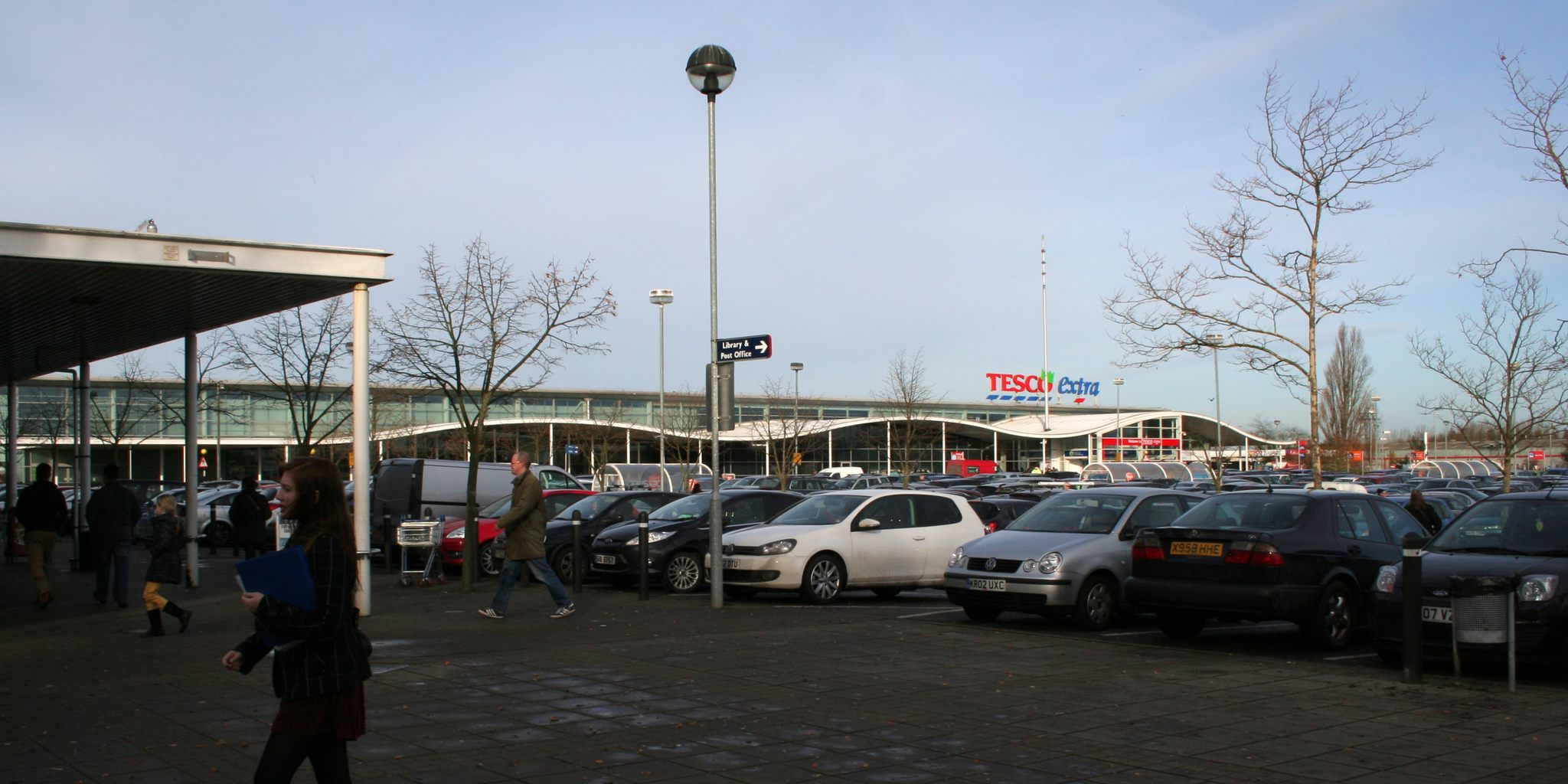
Tesco Extra

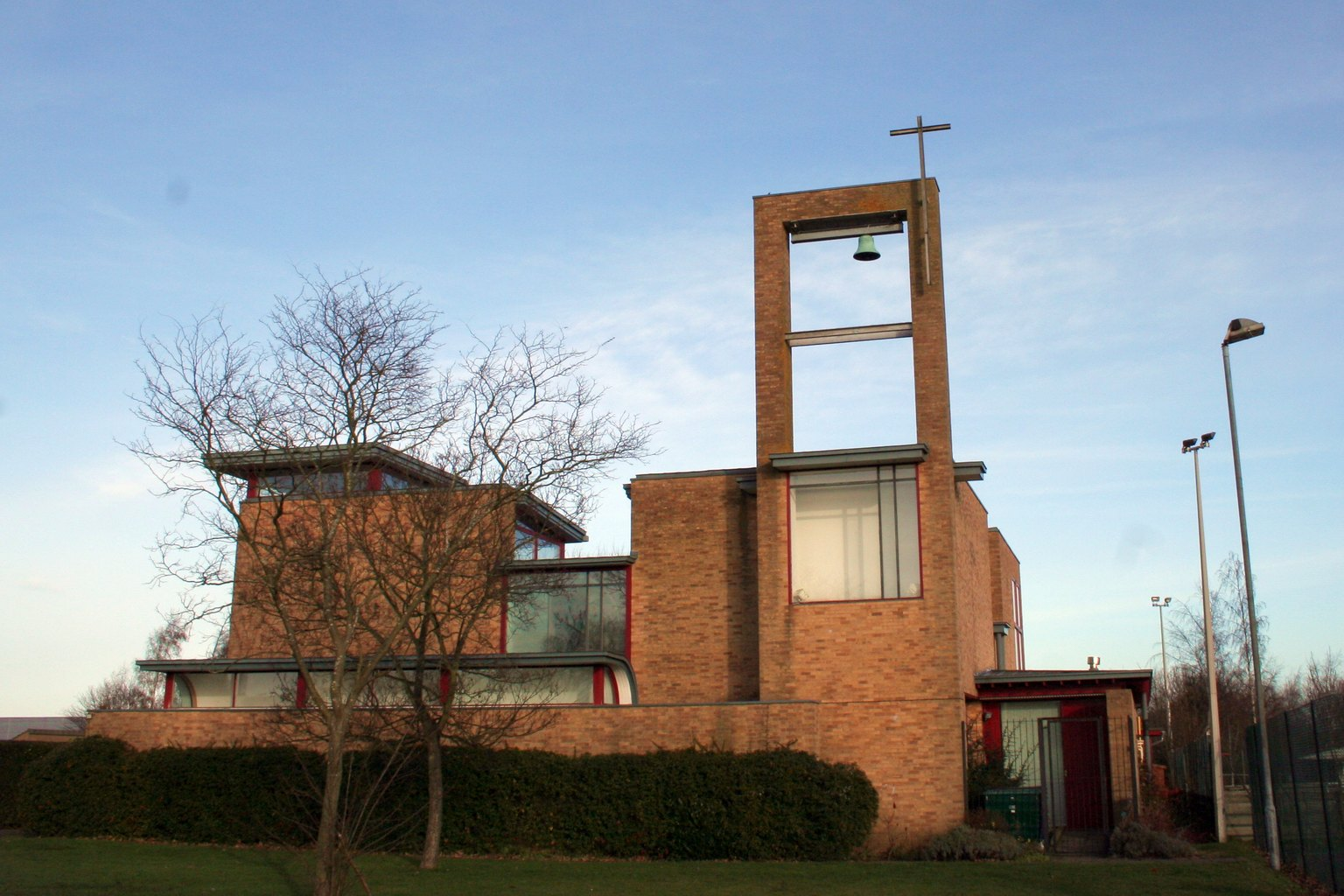
Church

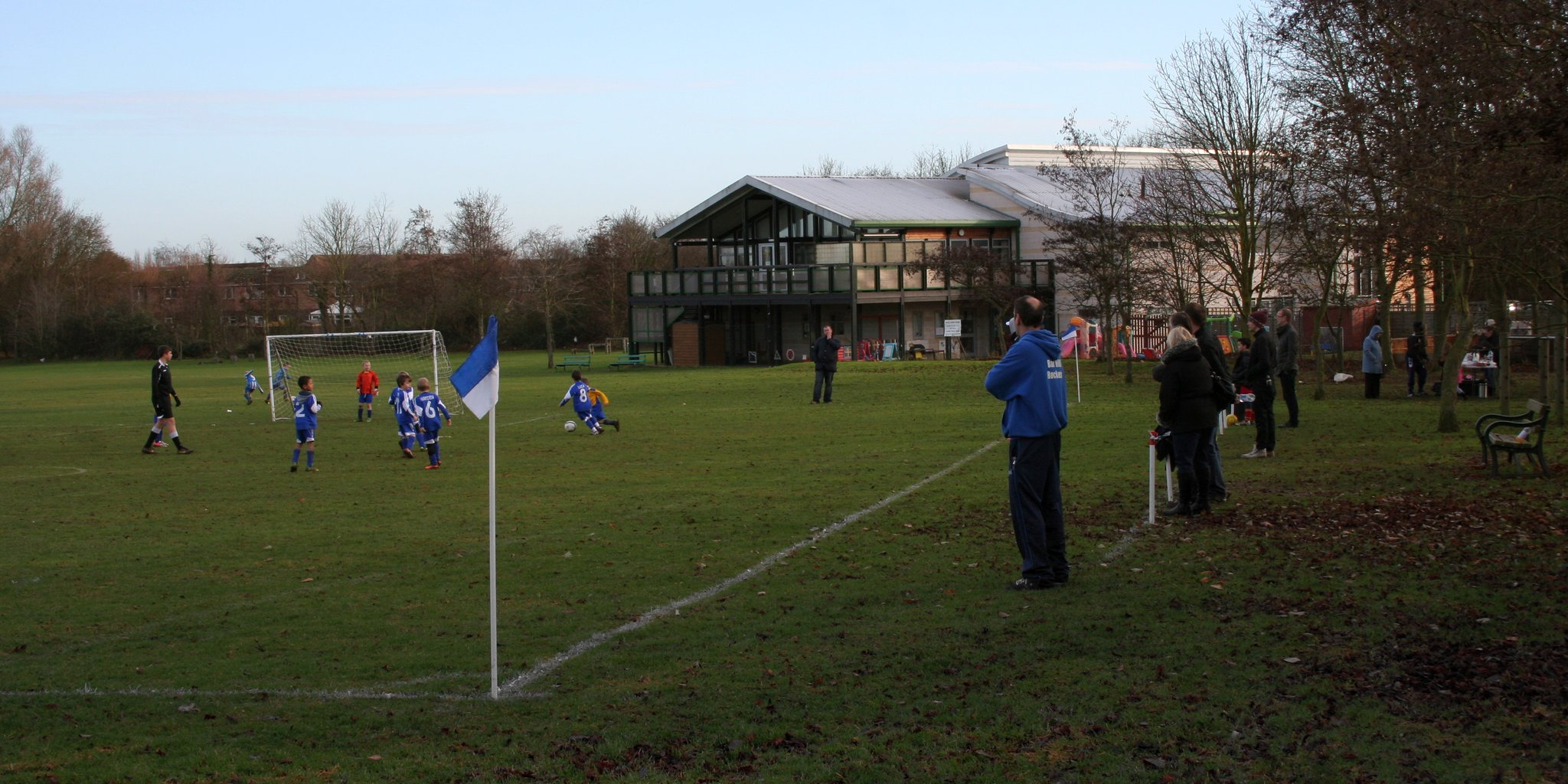
Village hall and field

== Transport ==
=== Road ===
The only road access to Bar Hill is via the B1050 at Junction 25 of the A14, where it also meets the A1307. Bar Hill is approximately 2 miles away from the northern terminus of the M11.

=== Cycling ===
Bar Hill has extensive cycling connections. It has a cycle path, The Drift, to Dry Drayton, and other Rights Of Way access to Lolworth and Longstanton. Cambridge and Swavesey are accessible by cycling via a cycle bridge which connects to paths alongside the A1307. Northstowe is accessible via a cycle path along the B1050 and Northstowe Road.

=== Public Transport ===
Bar Hill is connected to Cambridge City Centre, and Longstanton Park and Ride on the Cambridgeshire Guided Busway via the Citi 5 bus, operated by Stagecoach. The bus operates half-hourly on weekdays, and hourly on Sundays and Bank Holidays.

== See also ==
- Cambourne, another, later, planned village in South Cambridgeshire
- Northstowe, a new town in South Cambridgeshire close to Bar Hill
- Longstanton, a small village immediately to the North of Bar Hill (over the A14)
- Dry Drayton, the Parish from which the original land for Bar Hill was ceded on 1 April 1966
