= 2026 Exeter City Council election =

2026 English local government election

- 7 May 2026

14 out of 39 seats to Exeter City Council (including 1 by-election) 20 seats needed for a majority
	First party	Second party	Third party
Leader	Philip Bialyk	Diana Moore	Michael Mitchell
Party	Labour	Green	Liberal Democrats
Last election	24 seats, 38.1%	7 seats, 20.4%	4 seats, 10.3%
Seats before	22	7 (Note: Including the vacant seat in Heavitree last held by a Green.)	4
Seats won	4	6	2
Seats after	18	10	5
Seat change	▼4	▲3	▲1
Popular vote	9,917	14,667	5,245
Percentage	22.1%	32.7%	11.7%
Swing	▼16.0%	▲12.3%	▲1.4%
	Fourth party	Fifth party	Sixth party
Leader	None	Lucy Haigh/ Zoë Hughes (Note: Equity Independent group co-leaders.)	Peter Holland (retiring)
Party	Reform	Independent	Conservative
Last election	Did not stand	1 seat, 12.7%	3 seats, 18.5%
Seats before	2	2	2
Seats won	2	0	0
Seats after	3	2	1
Seat change	▲1	Steady	▼1
Popular vote	10,014	94	4,910
Percentage	22.3%	0.2%	10.9%
Swing	N/A	▼12.5%	▼7.6%
- Winner of each seat at the 2026 Exeter City Council election.
Leader before election
Philip Bialyk
Labour
Leader after election
Philip Bialyk
Labour
No overall control (Note: Labour minority)

The 2026 Exeter City Council election took place on 7 May 2026 to elect members of Exeter City Council in Devon, England. This was on the same day as other local elections.

Under current plans, the elections will be the last ever to the city council, as it is planned to be abolished in 2028 and replaced with a unitary authority. Elections will be held in 2027 to its replacement authority.

The elections were initially cancelled alongside others to 29 other authorities similarly planned to be replaced, however in February 2026 it was announced that the elections would go ahead as normal following filings by Reform UK for judicial review of the cancellation.

Prior to the election, the council was under Labour majority control. At this election, the council went under no overall control. Labour remained the largest party, but fell two seats short of an overall majority. They continued to run the council after the election as a minority administration.

== Summary ==
=== Council composition ===
After 2024 election		Before 2026 election	
Party	Seats	Party	Seats
Labour	24	Labour	22
Green	7	Green	6
Liberal Democrats	4	Liberal Democrats	4
Conservative	3	Conservative	2
Reform	0	Reform	2
Independent	1	Independent	2
Vacant	0	Vacant	1

Changes 2024–2026:

- January 2025: Zoë Hughes (Labour) leaves party to sit as an independent
- April 2025: Naima Allcock (Labour) and Joshua Ellis-Jones (Labour) resign – by-elections held May 2025
- May 2025: James Cookson (Labour) wins by-election; Tony Payne (Reform) gains by-election from Labour
- December 2025: Alison Sheridan (Conservative) joins Reform
- March 2026: Carol Bennett (Green, Heavitree) resigned

=== Election result ===
2026 Exeter City Council election
Party	This election				Full council			This election		
Party	Candidates	Seats	Net	Seats %	Other	Total	Total %	Votes	Votes %	+/−
Labour	{{{candidates}}}	4	▼4	28.6	14	18	46.2	9,917	22.1	-16.0
Green	{{{candidates}}}	6	▲3	42.9	4	10	25.6	14,667	32.7	+12.3
Liberal Democrats	{{{candidates}}}	2	▲1	14.3	3	5	12.8	5,245	11.7	+1.4
Reform	{{{candidates}}}	2	▲1	14.3	1	3	7.7	10,014	22.3	N/A
Independent	{{{candidates}}}	0	Steady	0.0	2	2	5.1	94	0.2	-12.5
Conservative	{{{candidates}}}	0	▼1	0.0	1	1	2.6	4,910	10.9	-7.6
TUSC	{{{candidates}}}	0	Steady	0.0	0	0	0	10	<0.1	N/A

== Incumbents ==
Ward	Incumbent councillor	Party	Re-standing
Alphington	Bob Foale	Labour	No
Duryard & St James	Kevin Mitchell	Liberal Democrats	Yes
Exwick	Paul Knott	Labour	Yes
Heavitree	Catherine Rees	Green	No
Mincinglake & Whipton	Tony Payne (Note: Elected at the 2025 by-election in Mincinglake & Whipton.)	Reform	Yes
Newton & St Leonard's	Matthew Vizard	Labour	Yes
Pennsylvania	Josie Parkhouse	Labour Co-op	No
Pinhoe	Duncan Wood	Labour Co-op	Yes
Priory	Marina Asvachin	Labour	Yes
St David's	Tess Read	Green	No
St Loyes	Peter Holland	Conservative	No
St Thomas	Laura Wright	Labour Co-op	Yes
Topsham	James Cookson (Note: Elected at the 2025 by-election in Topsham.)	Labour	Yes

== Ward results ==
=== Alphington ===
Alphington
Party	Candidate	Votes	%	±%
Labour Co-op	Lucy Findlay	976	31.7	–14.3
Reform	Jayden Palmer	856	27.8	N/A
Green	Greg Wotton	624	20.2	+6.9
Conservative	Kayleigh Luscombe	442	14.3	–13.7
Liberal Democrats	JJ Pickin	185	5.9	–1.1
Majority		120	3.9	–14.1
Turnout		3,101	47.5	+13.3
Registered electors		6,527		
Labour Co-op hold				

=== Duryard & St. James ===
Duryard & St. James
Party	Candidate	Votes	%	±%
Liberal Democrats	Kevin Mitchell*	983	40.3	–5.1
Green	Mithat Ishakoglu	751	30.8	+17.1
Reform	David Hodge	327	13.4	N/A
Labour	Jonathan Hawke	261	10.7	–20.8
Conservative	Sebastian Stanwell-Wise	117	4.8	–4.6
Majority		232	9.5	–4.4
Turnout		2,447	39.0	+11.8
Registered electors		6,271		
Liberal Democrats hold		Swing	▼11.1	

=== Exwick ===
Exwick
Party	Candidate	Votes	%	±%
Labour Co-op	Paul Knott*	1,054	34.5	−19.7
Reform	Lee Gillett	931	30.5	N/A
Green	Kalkidan Legesse	709	23.2	+11.0
Conservative	David Luscombe	205	6.7	−5.5
Liberal Democrats	Jamie Horner	149	4.9	−1.4
Majority		123	4.0	−29.3
Turnout		3,057	41.8	+13.3
Registered electors		7,321		
Labour Co-op hold				

=== Heavitree ===
Heavitree (2 seats due to by-election)
Party	Candidate	Votes	%	±%
Green	Stella Smith	1,889	53.1	+24.0
Green	Helen Terry	1,868	52.5	+23.4
Reform	Tina Beer	697	19.6	N/A
Reform	Lisa Norris	657	18.5	N/A
Labour	Rachel Sutton	523	14.7	–7.0
Labour	Dave Mutton	499	14.0	–7.7
Conservative	Katherine New	273	7.7	–3.2
Liberal Democrats	Philip Brock	243	6.8	+4.5
Liberal Democrats	Nigel Williams	201	5.6	+3.3
Conservative	Colin Trudgeon	173	4.9	–6.0
Independent	Jordan Newbery	94	2.6	N/A
Turnout		3,607	53.7	+4.9
Registered electors		6,715		
Green hold				
Green hold				

=== Mincinglake & Whipton ===
Mincinglake & Whipton
Party	Candidate	Votes	%	±%
Reform	Anthony Payne*	952	34.1	N/A
Green	Martin Ayres	812	29.1	+21.4
Labour Co-op	Steve Casemore	658	23.6	–14.9
Conservative	David Thompson	190	6.8	–6.5
Liberal Democrats	Michael Payne	178	6.4	+1.3
Majority		140	5.0	N/A
Turnout		2,799	43.5	+9.8
Registered electors		6,437		
Reform hold				

=== Newtown & St. Leonard's ===
Newtown & St. Leonard's
Party	Candidate	Votes	%	±%
Green	Bernadette Chelvanayagam	1,430	47.3	+0.3
Labour	Matthew Vizard*	839	27.7	–8.7
Reform	Jo Westlake	389	9.6	N/A
Conservative	Ruth Smith	220	7.3	–1.1
Liberal Democrats	Jonny Pye	146	4.8	+1.1
Majority		591	19.5	N/A
Turnout		3,033	46.1	+7.0
Registered electors		6,582		
Green gain from Labour		Swing	▲4.5	

=== Pennsylvania ===
Pennsylvania
Party	Candidate	Votes	%	±%
Green	Gill Baker	1,325	38.6	+7.8
Liberal Democrats	Will Aczel	628	18.3	+12.1
Reform	Michael Battershill	585	17.0	N/A
Labour Co-op	Paula Black	584	17.0	–21.8
Conservative	Rob Hannaford	303	8.8	–4.9
TUSC	Myles Hatcher	10	0.3	N/A
Majority		697	20.3	N/A
Turnout		3,445	48.4	+8.8
Registered electors		7,117		
Green gain from Labour Co-op		Swing	▼2.2	

=== Pinhoe ===
Pinhoe
Party	Candidate	Votes	%	±%
Labour Co-op	Duncan Wood*	1,160	33.8	–8.1
Reform	Ashton Messer	966	28.2	N/A
Conservative	Ian Baldwin	538	15.7	–8.1
Green	Mark Allen	518	15.1	+2.8
Liberal Democrats	Christine Campion	245	7.1	–1.9
Majority		194	5.7	–12.4
Turnout		3,437	42.3	+10.0
Registered electors		8,118		
Labour Co-op hold				

=== Priory ===
Priory
Party	Candidate	Votes	%	±%
Reform	Nicholas Williams	827	28.9	N/A
Labour	Marina Asvachin*	815	28.5	–13.4
Green	Jack Vickers	660	23.0	+12.0
Conservative	Rob Newby	363	12.7	–3.5
Liberal Democrats	Philip Thomas	199	6.9	–3.0
Majority		12	0.4	N/A
Turnout		2,873	43.8	+11.5
Registered electors		6,560		
Reform gain from Labour				

=== St. David's ===
St. David's
Party	Candidate	Votes	%	±%
Green	Brian Rappert	1,618	57.1	+6.1
Labour Co-op	Rose Lelliott	446	15.7	–18.0
Reform	Susan Clow	444	15.7	N/A
Conservative	Yasmine Al-Saket	168	5.9	–4.8
Liberal Democrats	Charles Curnock	159	5.6	+1.0
Majority		1,172	41.3	+24.0
Turnout		2,845	30.9	–2.4
Registered electors		7,014		
Green hold		Swing	▲12.1	

=== St. Loye's ===
St. Loye's
Party	Candidate	Votes	%	±%
Liberal Democrats	Paul Richards	817	25.6	+19.0
Reform	Christopher Owen	812	25.5	N/A
Conservative	Joan Collacott	808	25.3	−23.2
Green	Chloe Whipple	410	12.9	+4.5
Labour	Laila Jhaveri	342	10.7	−25.7
Majority		5	0.2	N/A
Turnout		3,192	46.0	+9.4
Registered electors		6,933		
Liberal Democrats gain from Conservative				

=== St. Thomas ===
St. Thomas
Party	Candidate	Votes	%	±%
Green	Jack Reed	1,354	37.0	+26.2
Liberal Democrats	Vanessa Newcombe	865	23.7	–4.2
Reform	Robert-James Cockburn	711	19.5	N/A
Labour Co-op	Laura Wright*	571	15.6	–22.7
Conservative	Caroline Stone	154	4.2	–1.9
Majority		489	13.4	N/A
Turnout		3,661	49.8	+11.7
Registered electors		7,347		
Green gain from Labour Co-op		Swing	▲15.2	

=== Topsham ===
Topsham
Party	Candidate	Votes	%	±%
Labour	James Cookson*	1,189	30.1	–15.0
Conservative	Cynthia Thompson	956	24.2	–12.6
Reform	Sue Davies	860	21.8	N/A
Green	Ann Keen	699	17.7	+6.9
Liberal Democrats	Tim Gainsford	247	6.2	–1.1
Majority		233	5.9	–2.4
Turnout		3,963	47.3	+10.0
Registered electors		8,372		
Labour hold		Swing	▼1.2	
