= 2025 Cambridgeshire and Peterborough mayoral election =

2025 English local election

- 1 May 2025
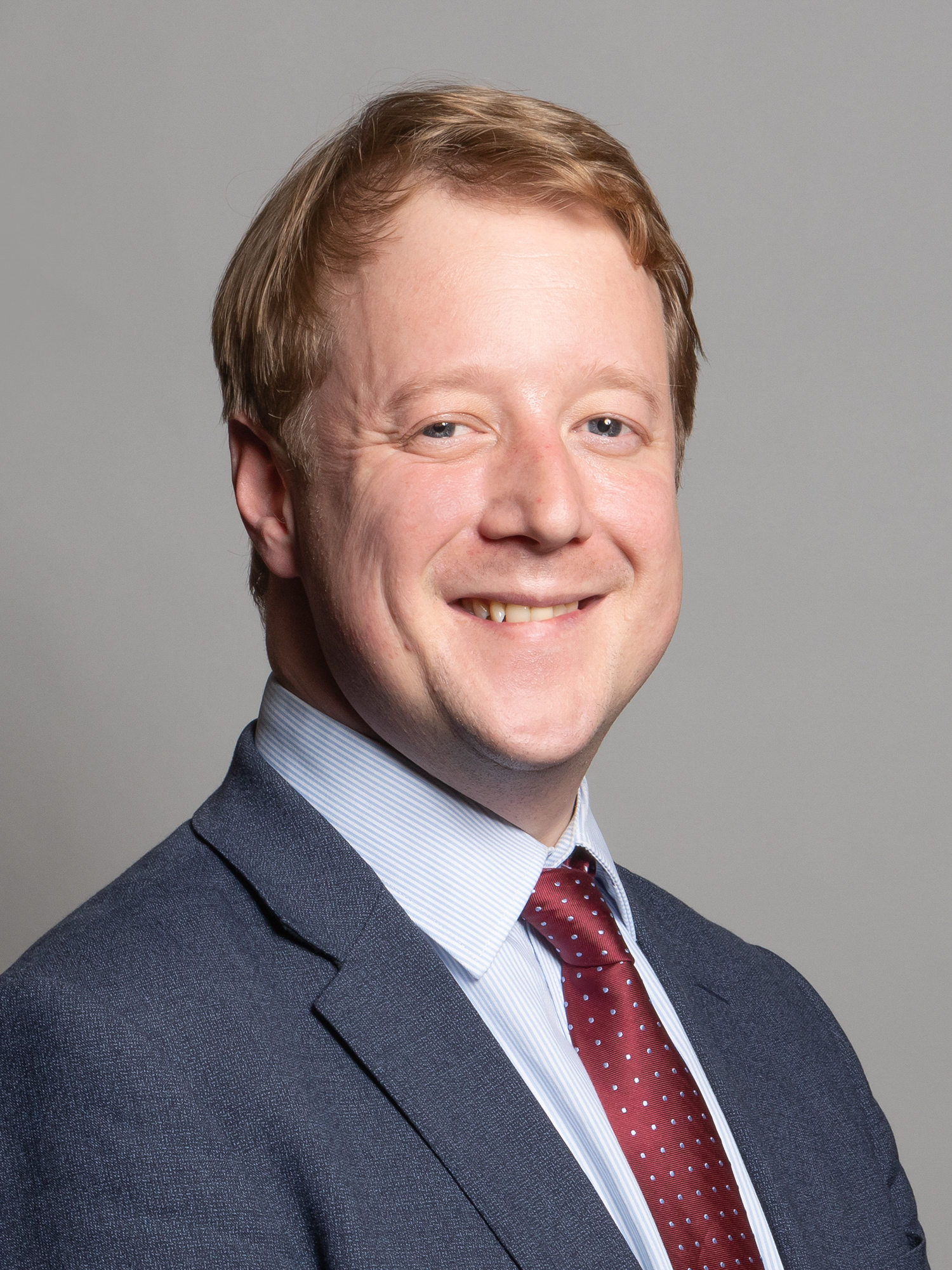
	Majority party	Minority party	Third party
Candidate	Paul Bristow	Ryan Coogan	Anna Smith
Party	Conservative	Reform	Labour Co-op
Popular vote	60,243	49,647	42,671
Percentage	28.4%	23.4%	20.1%
Swing	▼12.1pp	New party	▼12.7pp
	Fourth party	Fifth party
Candidate	Lorna Dupré	Bob Ensch
Party	Liberal Democrats	Green
Popular vote	41,611	18,255
Percentage	19.6%	8.6%
Swing	▼7.1pp	New party
- Results of the election by first placed candidate in each local authority
Mayor before election
Nik Johnson
Labour
Elected mayor
Paul Bristow
Conservative

The 2025 Cambridgeshire and Peterborough mayoral election took place on 1 May 2025 to elect the Mayor of Cambridgeshire and Peterborough. The Conservative candidate and former MP Paul Bristow won, gaining the seat from Labour. This was held on the same day as other local elections.

== Background ==
The mayor of Cambridgeshire and Peterborough serves as the directly elected leader of the Cambridgeshire and Peterborough Combined Authority. The mayor has power over investment directly to the combined authority from the government of £20 million a year for 30 years from 2017. The mayor does not incorporate the Cambridgeshire Police and Crime Commissioner into the post.

In the 2021 Cambridgeshire and Peterborough mayoral election, the Labour candidate Nik Johnson was elected with 32.8% of the vote in the first round and 51.3% of the second round vote. In early 2025, Johnson announced he would not be running for a second term.

== Electoral system ==
In 2017 and 2021, the Mayor was elected using a supplementary vote system, in which voters may express a first and second preference for candidates. The 2019–24 Conservative government abolished this system, meaning the 2025 election used first-past-the-post.

== Candidates ==
=== Confirmed ===
- Anna Smith (Labour)
- Paul Bristow (Conservative)
- Lorna Dupré (Liberal Democrats)
- Bob Ensch (Green Party)
- Ryan Coogan (Reform UK)

=== Declined ===
- Nik Johnson (Labour), incumbent Mayor of Cambridgeshire and Peterborough

== Results ==
=== Overall ===
2025 Cambridgeshire and Peterborough mayoral election
Party	Candidate	Votes	%	±%
Conservative	Paul Bristow	60,243	28.4	▼12.1
Reform	Ryan Coogan	49,647	23.4	N/A
Labour Co-op	Anna Smith	42,671	20.1	▼12.7
Liberal Democrats	Lorna Dupré	41,611	19.6	▼7.1
Green	Bob Ensch	18,255	8.6	N/A
Majority		10,596	5.0	–0.5
Rejected ballots		2,145		
Turnout		212,427	32.9	–4.1
Conservative gain from Labour		Swing	▼7.8	

=== By local authority ===
==== Cambridge ====
2025 Cambridgeshire and Peterborough mayoral election in Cambridge
Party	Candidate	Votes	%	±%
Labour	Anna Smith	13,382	40.3	−10.4
Liberal Democrats	Lorna Dupre	6,340	19.1	−14.0
Green	Bob Ensch	5,332	16.1	N/A
Conservative	Paul Bristow	5,042	15.2	−1.1
Reform	Ryan Coogan	3,122	9.4	N/A

==== East Cambridgeshire ====
2025 Cambridgeshire and Peterborough mayoral election in East Cambridgeshire
Party	Candidate	Votes	%	±%
Liberal Democrats	Lorna Dupre	7,473	31.8	−1.3
Reform	Ryan Coogan	5,924	25.2	N/A
Conservative	Paul Bristow	5,733	24.4	−19.9
Labour	Anna Smith	2,863	12.2	−10.4
Green	Bob Ensch	1,528	6.5	N/A

==== Fenland ====
2025 Cambridgeshire and Peterborough mayoral election in Fenland
Party	Candidate	Votes	%	±%
Reform	Ryan Coogan	9,246	40.5	N/A
Conservative	Paul Bristow	8,302	36.4	−28.8
Labour	Anna Smith	2,176	9.5	−13.6
Liberal Democrats	Lorna Dupre	2,050	9.0	−2.7
Green	Bob Ensch	1,063	4.7	N/A

==== Huntingdonshire ====
2025 Cambridgeshire and Peterborough mayoral election in Huntingdonshire
Party	Candidate	Votes	%	±%
Conservative	Paul Bristow	13,797	29.9	−17.4
Reform	Ryan Coogan	13,376	29.0	N/A
Liberal Democrats	Lorna Dupre	9,024	19.6	−0.3
Labour	Anna Smith	6,694	14.5	−18.3
Green	Bob Ensch	3,206	7.0	N/A

==== Peterborough ====
2025 Cambridgeshire and Peterborough mayoral election in Peterborough
Party	Candidate	Votes	%	±%
Conservative	Paul Bristow	15,769	41.3	−6.4
Reform	Ryan Coogan	9,221	24.2	N/A
Labour	Anna Smith	7,629	20.0	−20.1
Liberal Democrats	Lorna Dupre	2,907	7.6	−4.7
Green	Bob Ensch	2,649	6.9	N/A

==== South Cambridgeshire ====
2025 Cambridgeshire and Peterborough mayoral election in South Cambridgeshire
Party	Candidate	Votes	%	±%
Liberal Democrats	Lorna Dupre	13,817	28.4	−15.4
Conservative	Paul Bristow	11,600	23.9	−10.1
Labour	Anna Smith	9,927	20.4	−1.8
Reform	Ryan Coogan	8,758	18.0	N/A
Green	Bob Ensch	4,477	9.2	N/A

== Opinion polling ==
Dates conducted	Pollster	Client	Sample size	Bristow Con	Smith Lab	Dupré LD	Coogan Ref	Ensch Grn	Oth	Lead
1 May 2025	2025 mayoral election		–	28.4%	20.1%	19.6%	23.4%	8.6%	–	5.0
29–30 Apr	Find Out Now	N/A	900	32%	17%	19%	23%	9%	–	9
15–23 Apr	More in Common	The Observer	997	30%	23%	20%	18%	9%	–	7
9–23 Apr 2025	YouGov	N/A	1165	32%	19%	18%	20%	10%	–	12
6–10 Mar 2025	Labour Together (Note: Labour Together is not a BPC pollster.)	N/A	822	31%	27%	20%	13%	6%	3%	4
6 May 2021	2021 mayoral election (1st round)		–	40.5%	32.8%	26.7%	–	–	–	7.7

== See also ==
- Cambridgeshire County Council elections
