= 2025 Exeter City Council by-elections =

English local election

1 May 2025

2 out of 39 seats to Exeter City Council 20 seats needed for a majority

	First party	Second party	Third party
Leader	Philip Bialyk	Tony Payne	Michael Mitchell
Party	Labour	Reform	Liberal Democrats
Seats before	21	0	4
Seats won	1	1	0
Seats after	22	1	4
Seat change	▲1	▲1	Steady
Popular vote	1563	1549	496
Percentage	28.1%	27.8%	8.9%
Swing	▼10%	▲27.8%	▼1.4%
	Fourth party	Fifth party	Sixth party
Leader	Anne Jobson	Diana Moore
Party	Conservative	Green	Independent
Seats before	3	7	2
Seats won	0	0	0
Seats after	3	7	2
Seat change	Steady	Steady	Steady
Popular vote	1094	590	259
Percentage	19.7%	10.6%	4.7%
Swing	▲1.2%	▼9.8%	▼8%
- Winner of each seat at the 2025 Exeter City Council by-elections
Leader before election
Philip Bialyk
Labour
Leader after election
Philip Bialyk
Labour

The 2025 Exeter City Council by-elections took place on 1 May 2025 to elect members of vacant seats in Exeter City Council in Devon, England. This was on the same day as other local elections. There were 2 of 39 seats on the council up for election.

Labour and Reform gained seats.

== Summary ==
=== Election result ===
2025 Exeter City Council by-elections
Party	This election			Full council			This election		
Party	Seats	Net	Seats %	Other	Total	Total %	Votes	Votes %	+/−
Labour	1	▲1	50	21	22	56.4	1563	28.1	–10
Reform	1	▲1	50	0	1	2.6	1549	27.8	+27.8
Conservative	0	Steady	0	3	3	7.7	1094	19.7	+1.2
Green	0	Steady	0	7	7	17.9	590	20.4	–1.6
Liberal Democrats	0	Steady	0	4	4	10.3	496	8.9	–1.4
Independent	0	Steady	0	2	2	2.6	259	4.7	–8

== Ward results ==
The Statement of Persons Nominated, which details the candidates standing in each ward, was released by Exeter City Council following the close of nominations on 3 April 2025.

=== Mincinglake & Whipton ===
Mincinglake and Whipton
Party	Candidate	Votes	%	±%
Reform	Tony Payne	789	34.8	+34.8
Labour Co-op	Paula Black	630	27.8	−10.7
Independent	Angela Martin	259	11.4	N/A
Green	Martin Ayres	251	11.1	+3.4
Conservative	Ian Anthony Baldwin	189	8.3	−5.0
Liberal Democrats	Paul Richards	147	6.5	+1.4
Majority		159	7.0	
Turnout		2270	34.89	
Registered electors		6,505		
Reform gain from Labour		Swing		

=== Topsham ===
Topsham
Party	Candidate	Votes	%	±%
Labour	James Elie Cookson	933	28.3	−16.8
Conservative	Keith Andrew Sparkes	905	27.5	−9.3
Reform	Edward Clive Andrew Hill	760	23.1	+23.1
Liberal Democrats	Philip Alexander Thomas	349	10.6	+3.3
Green	Greg Wotton	339	10.3	−0.5
Majority		28	0.8	
Turnout		3293	39.86	
Registered electors		8,262		
Labour hold		Swing		
