= Projected National Share =

British political term

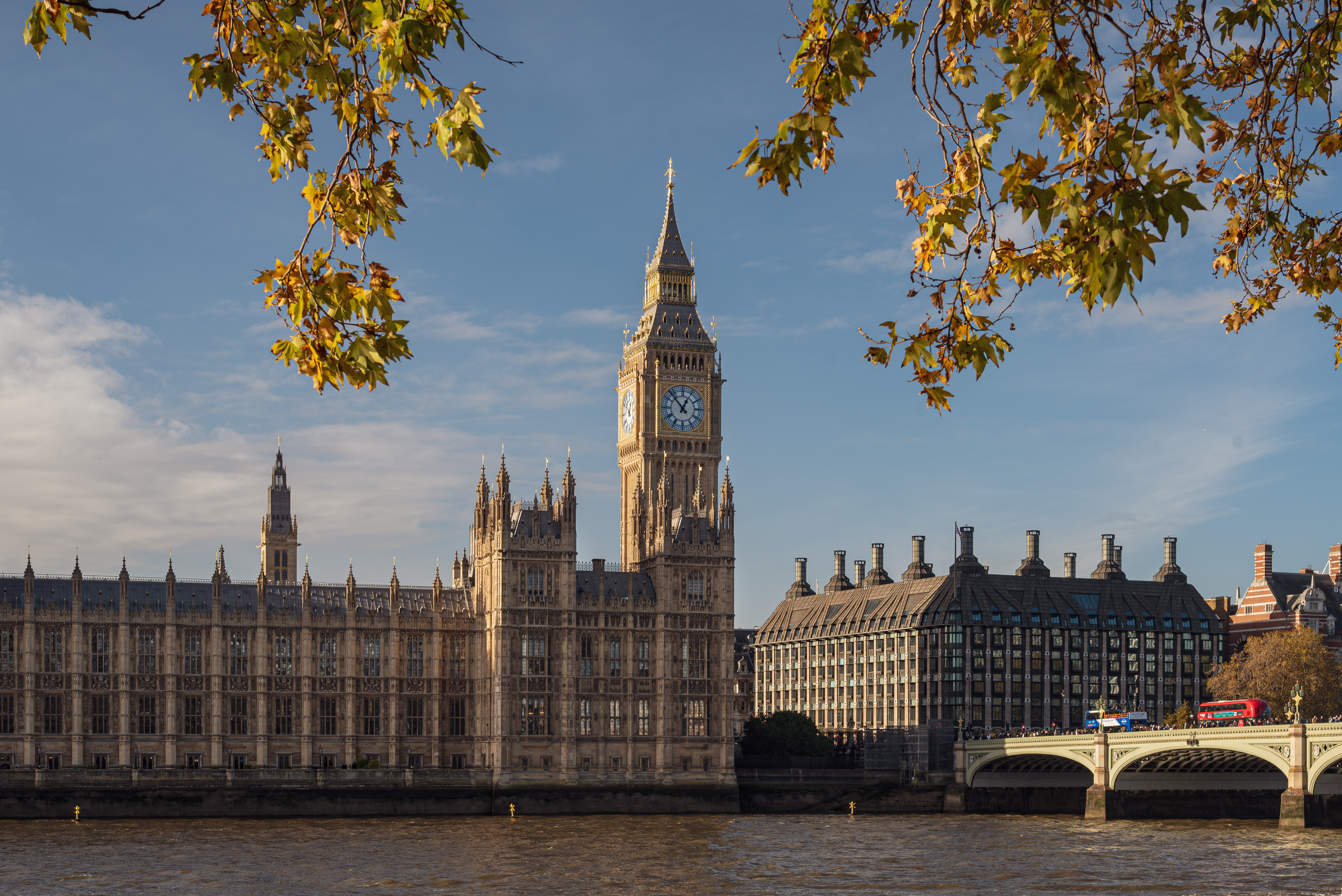
Projected National Share estimates the national share of the vote for each of the main political parties based on the voting patterns in any given local election (pictured Palace of Westminster).

Projected National Share (PNS) is a statistic used in British politics. It refers to the translation of local election results into an estimation of the national levels of support that each party would have received had the local elections been taking place across the whole country and with each of the significant political parties standing candidates everywhere. PNS shows which party has ‘won’ any given annual local election cycle (in terms of achieving the highest projected share of the national vote). It also enables psephologists and political commentators to compare the performances of the main political parties (by their projected national shares of the vote) across different years and different local election cycles. This is helpful and important, given that local elections take place in different parts of the country each year; in some years the bulk of the contests can be taking place in the ‘Tory shires’, whereas in other years the local contests can be taking place predominantly in cities and metropolitan areas that have traditionally favoured the Labour Party. The numbers give an impression of how the political parties would have fared if the entire country had been casting a local ballot. PNS can be calculated in different ways.

== History ==
BBC News has calculated PNS since 1982. They use key wards which are reflective of the country as a whole in order to calculate party share. Two academics at the University of Plymouth, Colin Rallings and Michael Thrasher, calculate National Equivalent share (NEV) using a different approach.

Author and peer Mark Pack maintains a historical record named LocalBase of both sets of results.

== By local election ==
Election	Lab	Con	Lib Dem	Ref (Note: UKIP from 2013–2017, also led by Nigel Farage until 2016.)	Grn	Other (Note: Independents, residents associations and minor parties (including Greens from 2015–2019, UKIP in 2012 and after 2017, and Reform UK in 2019).)	Ref.
2012	38	31	16	—N/a	—N/a	15	
2013	29	25	14	23	—N/a	9	
2014	31	29	13	17	—N/a	10	
2015	29	35	11	13	—N/a	12	
2016	31	30	15	12	—N/a	12	
2017	27	38	18	5	—N/a	12	
2018	35	35	16	—N/a	—N/a	14	
2019	28	28	19	—N/a	—N/a	25	
2021	29	36	17	—N/a	—N/a	12	
2022	35	30	19	—N/a	11	5	
2023	35	26	20	—N/a	12	7	
2024	34	25	17	2	13	9	
2025	20	15	17	30	11	7	
2026	17	17	16	26	18	6	
