= 2025 Wiltshire Council election =

2025 English local election

- 1 May 2025

All 98 seats to Wiltshire Council 50 seats needed for a majority
- Turnout: 35.03%
| | First party | Second party | Third party |
|---|---|---|---|
| | LD | Con | Ref |
| Leader | Ian Thorn | Richard Clewer | Ed Rimmer |
| Party | Liberal Democrats | Conservative | Reform |
| Leader's seat | Calne Central | Downton & Ebble Valley | Salisbury Bemerton Heath |
| Last election | 27 seats, 28.1% | 61 seats, 47.3% | did not stand |
| Seats before | 29 | 57 | 0 |
| Seats won | 43 | 37 | 10 |
| Seat change | ▲16 | ▼24 | ▲10 |
| Popular vote | 46,396 | 43,904 | 30,312 |
| Percentage | 33.9% | 32.1% | 22.2% |
| Swing | ▲5.8 pp | ▼15.2 pp | ▲22.2 pp |
| | Fourth party | Fifth party |
| | Ind | Lab |
| Leader | Ernie Clark | Ricky Rogers |
| Party | Independent | Labour |
| Leader's seat | Hilperton | Salisbury Fisherton & Bemerton Village |
| Last election | 7 seats, 8.7% | 3 seats, 7.7% |
| Seats before | 9 | 3 |
| Seats won | 7 | 1 |
| Seat change | Steady | ▼2 |
| Popular vote | 6,903 | 4,829 |
| Percentage | 5.1% | 3.5% |
| Swing | ▼3.6 pp | ▼4.2 pp |
- Map showing the composition of Wiltshire Council following the election. Yellow showing Liberal Democrats, Blue showing Conservative, Turquoise showing Reform UK, Red showing Labour, and Grey showing Independents.

- Council composition after the election.
Leader before election
Richard Clewer
Conservative
Leader after election
Ian Thorn
Liberal Democrat
No overall control

The 2025 Wiltshire Council election was held on 1 May 2025, electing members to Wiltshire Council in Wiltshire, England, one of the 2025 United Kingdom local elections. All 98 councillors, one from each division, were elected using the first-past-the-post voting system. Wiltshire was one of eight unitary authorities to hold elections in 2025, after the government delayed local elections in many other areas until 2026 as part of a plan to reorganise local government. The council had a Conservative majority prior to the election. The election saw the council go under no overall control with the Liberal Democrats becoming the largest party.

The Conservatives lost nearly a third of their seats and overall control of the council, bringing an end to 25 years of majority rule. The Liberal Democrats emerged as the largest party on the council for the first time since 1997. Reform UK also experienced a significant increase in representation, winning 10 seats, the party's first-ever seats in the county council's elections. Labour experienced a decline of more than half in their share of the total vote, retaining only a single seat on the council. At the subsequent annual council meeting on 20 May 2025, Liberal Democrat councillor Ian Thorn was appointed the new leader of the council, leading an administration based on a partnership between the Liberal Democrats and independents.

== Previous council composition ==
| After 2021 election | | Before 2025 election | |
| Party | Seats | Party | Seats |
|---|---|---|---|
| Conservative | 61 | Conservative | 57 |
| Liberal Democrats | 27 | Liberal Democrats | 29 |
| Labour | 3 | Labour | 3 |
| Independent | 7 | Independent | 9 |

== Results Summary ==
2025 Wiltshire Council election
| Party | Candidates | Seats | Gains | Losses | Net gain/loss | Seats % | Votes % | Votes | +/− |
|---|---|---|---|---|---|---|---|---|---|
| Liberal Democrats | 98 | 43 | 17 | 1 | +16 | 43.9 | 33.9 | 46,396 | ▲5.8 |
| Conservative | 98 | 37 | 0 | 24 | -24 | 37.8 | 32.1 | 43,904 | ▼15.2 |
| Reform | 98 | 10 | 10 | 0 | +10 | 10.2 | 22.2 | 30,312 | New |
| Independent | 19 | 7 | 2 | 2 | 0 | 7.1 | 5.1 | 6,903 | ▼3.6 |
| Labour | 45 | 1 | 0 | 2 | -2 | 1.0 | 3.5 | 4,829 (Note: Including 171 votes for Labour Co-op candidates) | ▼4.2 |
| Green | 44 | 0 | 0 | 0 | 0 | 0.0 | 3.1 | 4,228 | ▼5.0 |
| Heritage | 1 | 0 | 0 | 0 | 0 | 0.0 | <0.1 | 66 | New |
| Communist | 1 | 0 | 0 | 0 | 0 | 0.0 | <0.1 | 26 | New |

== Results by electoral divisions ==
The electoral division results listed below are based on the changes from the 2021 elections, not taking into account any party defections or by-elections.

Sitting councillors are marked with an asterisk (*).

=== Aldbourne and Ramsbury ===
Aldbourne and Ramsbury
| Party | Candidate | Votes | % | ±% |
|---|---|---|---|---|
| Conservative | James Sheppard* | 723 | 42.50 | –21.94 |
| Reform | Aurelia Stephenson | 410 | 24.10 | N/A |
| Liberal Democrats | Ben Jackson | 392 | 23.05 | +12.31 |
| Green | Charles O'Farrell | 176 | 10.35 | –4.71 |
| Majority | | 313 | 18.40 | –30.98 |
| Turnout | | 1,706 | 38.26 | –3.30 |
| Rejected ballots | | 5 | 0.29 | |
| Registered electors | | 4,459 | | |
| Conservative hold | | Swing | | |

=== Alderbury and Whiteparish ===
Alderbury and Whiteparish
| Party | Candidate | Votes | % | ±% |
|---|---|---|---|---|
| Conservative | Gregory Cooper | 774 | 44.92 | –14.68 |
| Reform | Phil Harris | 345 | 20.02 | N/A |
| Liberal Democrats | Ted Last | 254 | 14.74 | –0.80 |
| Green | Di Cross | 228 | 13.23 | –3.10 |
| Labour | Clive Bundy | 122 | 7.08 | –1.45 |
| Registered electors | | 4,630 | | |
| Majority | | 429 | 24.90 | –18.37 |
| Turnout | | 1,725 | 37.26 | –8.06 |
| Rejected ballots | | 2 | 0.12 | |
| Conservative hold | | Swing | | |

=== Amesbury East and Bulford ===
Amesbury East and Bulford
| Party | Candidate | Votes | % | ±% |
|---|---|---|---|---|
| Reform | Kevin Asplin | 470 | 47.72 | N/A |
| Conservative | Mark Verbinnen* | 316 | 32.08 | –35.82 |
| Liberal Democrats | Marcus Mann | 132 | 13.40 | +3.09 |
| Independent | Jacob Jaconiah | 68 | 6.90 | N/A |
| Majority | | 154 | 15.62 | N/A |
| Turnout | | 988 | 22.86 | –1.27 |
| Rejected ballots | | 3 | 0.30 | |
| Registered electors | | 4,322 | | |
| Reform gain from Conservative | | Swing | | |

=== Amesbury South ===
Amesbury South
| Party | Candidate | Votes | % | ±% |
|---|---|---|---|---|
| Liberal Democrats | Alan Hagger | 517 | 43.52 | +37.16 |
| Reform | Lee Sarjant | 330 | 27.78 | N/A |
| Conservative | Rob Yuill* | 291 | 24.49 | –40.48 |
| Labour | Colin Skelton | 50 | 4.21 | –17.61 |
| Majority | | 187 | 15.74 | N/A |
| Turnout | | 1,190 | 28.64 | –0.70 |
| Rejected ballots | | 2 | 0.17 | |
| Registered electors | | 4,155 | | |
| Liberal Democrats gain from Conservative | | Swing | | |

=== Amesbury West ===
Amesbury West
| Party | Candidate | Votes | % | ±% |
|---|---|---|---|---|
| Conservative | Monica Devendran* | 540 | 41.19 | –24.01 |
| Reform | Daniel King | 447 | 34.10 | N/A |
| Liberal Democrats | Barry Rhodes | 324 | 24.71 | +15.99 |
| Majority | | 93 | 7.09 | –42.57 |
| Turnout | | 1,318 | 30.66 | –0.15 |
| Rejected ballots | | 7 | 0.53 | |
| Registered electors | | 4,299 | | |
| Conservative hold | | Swing | | |

=== Avon Valley ===
Avon Valley
| Party | Candidate | Votes | % | ±% |
|---|---|---|---|---|
| Conservative | Ian Blair-Pilling* | 451 | 50.28 | –17.39 |
| Reform | Kyle Dickinson | 291 | 32.44 | N/A |
| Liberal Democrats | David Pike | 155 | 17.28 | +8.74 |
| Majority | | 160 | 17.84 | –35.06 |
| Turnout | | 901 | 21.73 | –5.87 |
| Rejected ballots | | 4 | 0.44 | |
| Registered electors | | 4,146 | | |
| Conservative hold | | Swing | | |

=== Bowerhill ===
Bowerhill
| Party | Candidate | Votes | % | ±% |
|---|---|---|---|---|
| Conservative | Nick Holder* | 543 | 45.21 | –30.74 |
| Reform | Richard Visick | 412 | 34.30 | N/A |
| Liberal Democrats | Joyce Griffin | 245 | 20.40 | –3.65 |
| Majority | | 131 | 10.92 | –21.66 |
| Turnout | | 1,204 | 34.51 | +1.93 |
| Rejected ballots | | 3 | 0.25 | |
| Registered electors | | 3,489 | | |
| Conservative hold | | Swing | | |

=== Box and Colerne ===
Box and Colerne
| Party | Candidate | Votes | % | ±% |
|---|---|---|---|---|
| Liberal Democrats | Phil Chamberlain | 869 | 51.63 | –13.93 |
| Conservative | Brian Burchfield | 550 | 32.68 | –1.76 |
| Reform | Philip Jones | 203 | 12.06 | N/A |
| Green | Adrian Wolstenholme | 61 | 3.62 | N/A |
| Majority | | 319 | 18.95 | –12.16 |
| Turnout | | 1,686 | 42.68 | –6.21 |
| Rejected ballots | | 3 | 0.18 | |
| Registered electors | | 3,950 | | |
| Liberal Democrats hold | | Swing | | |

=== Bradford-on-Avon North ===
Bradford-on-Avon North
| Party | Candidate | Votes | % | ±% |
|---|---|---|---|---|
| Liberal Democrats | Sam Blackwell | 1,057 | 58.89 | +10.65 |
| Reform | Ted Hawke | 235 | 13.09 | N/A |
| Conservative | Finley Kingston-Davies | 195 | 10.86 | –9.79 |
| Independent | Simon McNeill-Ritchie | 173 | 9.64 | –11.92 |
| Green | Anna Marie | 135 | 7.52 | –2.03 |
| Majority | | 822 | 45.79 | +19.11 |
| Turnout | | 1,804 | 44.46 | –8.47 |
| Rejected ballots | | 9 | 0.50 | |
| Registered electors | | 4,058 | | |
| Liberal Democrats hold | | Swing | | |

=== Bradford-on-Avon South ===
Bradford-on-Avon South
| Party | Candidate | Votes | % | ±% |
|---|---|---|---|---|
| Liberal Democrats | George Simmonds | 1,115 | 63.28 | –11.52 |
| Conservative | John Hargreaves | 271 | 15.38 | –9.82 |
| Reform | Jeremy Pugh | 217 | 12.32 | N/A |
| Green | Nicky Lambourne | 159 | 9.02 | N/A |
| Majority | | 844 | 47.90 | –1.70 |
| Turnout | | 1,770 | 42.39 | –9.75 |
| Rejected ballots | | 8 | 0.45 | |
| Registered electors | | 4,176 | | |
| Liberal Democrats hold | | Swing | | |

=== Brinkworth ===
Brinkworth
| Party | Candidate | Votes | % | ±% |
|---|---|---|---|---|
| Conservative | Elizabeth Threlfall* | 960 | 46.15 | –4.90 |
| Liberal Democrats | Chris Hurst | 870 | 41.83 | –3.68 |
| Reform | Peter Hansen | 230 | 11.06 | N/A |
| Labour | Philip Baffour | 20 | 0.96 | –2.48 |
| Majority | | 90 | 4.33 | –1.22 |
| Turnout | | 2,085 | 53.01 | –5.76 |
| Rejected ballots | | 5 | 0.24 | |
| Registered electors | | 3,933 | | |
| Conservative hold | | Swing | | |

=== Bromham, Rowde and Roundway ===
Bromham, Rowde and Roundway
| Party | Candidate | Votes | % | ±% |
|---|---|---|---|---|
| Conservative | Laura Mayes* | 983 | 60.68 | –3.35 |
| Reform | Kevin Chamberlain | 296 | 18.27 | N/A |
| Liberal Democrats | Adrienne Westbrook | 246 | 15.19 | –11.96 |
| Green | Georgina Cockburn | 95 | 5.86 | N/A |
| Majority | | 687 | 42.41 | +5.53 |
| Turnout | | 1,623 | 39.86 | –5.88 |
| Rejected ballots | | 3 | 0.18 | |
| Registered electors | | 4,072 | | |
| Conservative hold | | Swing | | |

=== By Brook ===
By Brook
| Party | Candidate | Votes | % | ±% |
|---|---|---|---|---|
| Liberal Democrats | Jon Atkey | 703 | 39.90 | +20.06 |
| Conservative | Nick Botterill* | 697 | 39.56 | –22.07 |
| Reform | Matthew Sheppard | 317 | 17.99 | N/A |
| Green | Martin Otto | 45 | 2.55 | –9.65 |
| Majority | | 6 | 0.34 | N/A |
| Turnout | | 1,765 | 49.30 | +6.35 |
| Rejected ballots | | 3 | 0.17 | |
| Registered electors | | 3,580 | | |
| Liberal Democrats gain from Conservative | | Swing | | |

=== Calne Central ===
Calne Central
| Party | Candidate | Votes | % | ±% |
|---|---|---|---|---|
| Liberal Democrats | Ian Thorn* | 595 | 42.74 | –11.40 |
| Reform | Violette Simpson | 465 | 33.41 | N/A |
| Conservative | Bobby Seymour | 254 | 18.25 | –14.81 |
| Labour | Celia Stevens | 78 | 5.60 | –2.18 |
| Majority | | 130 | 9.34 | –11.74 |
| Turnout | | 1,397 | 33.17 | –9.09 |
| Rejected ballots | | 5 | 0.36 | |
| Registered electors | | 4,212 | | |
| Liberal Democrats hold | | Swing | | |

=== Calne Chilvester and Abberd ===
Calne Chilvester and Abberd
| Party | Candidate | Votes | % | ±% |
|---|---|---|---|---|
| Reform | Augusta Urquhart-Nicholls | 407 | 37.79 | N/A |
| Liberal Democrats | Robert MacNaughton* | 398 | 36.95 | +9.76 |
| Conservative | Sarah-Jayne Puntis | 168 | 15.60 | –31.41 |
| Labour | John Boaler | 104 | 9.66 | –5.00 |
| Majority | | 9 | 0.84 | N/A |
| Turnout | | 1,080 | 27.21 | –4.69 |
| Rejected ballots | | 3 | 0.28 | |
| Registered electors | | 3,969 | | |
| Reform gain from Conservative | | Swing | | |

Note: Robert MacNaughton had previously gained the seat for the Liberal Democrats in a 2024 by-election.

=== Calne North ===
Calne North
| Party | Candidate | Votes | % | ±% |
|---|---|---|---|---|
| Reform | Mike Sankey* | 381 | 37.13 | N/A |
| Liberal Democrats | James Green | 342 | 33.33 | –1.60 |
| Conservative | Tom Rounds* | 197 | 19.20 | –24.24 |
| Labour | Jon Fisher | 106 | 10.33 | –5.78 |
| Majority | | 39 | 3.80 | N/A |
| Turnout | | 1,031 | 26.34 | –3.99 |
| Rejected ballots | | 5 | 0.48 | |
| Registered electors | | 3,914 | | |
| Reform gain from Conservative | | Swing | | |

=== Calne Rural ===
Calne Rural
| Party | Candidate | Votes | % | ±% |
|---|---|---|---|---|
| Conservative | Ashley O'Neill* | 820 | 47.07 | –13.49 |
| Reform | Paul Logan | 359 | 20.61 | N/A |
| Liberal Democrats | Steve Townsend | 339 | 19.46 | +5.02 |
| Labour | John Barnes | 224 | 12.86 | –0.78 |
| Majority | | 461 | 26.46 | –19.65 |
| Turnout | | 1,744 | 40.82 | –7.09 |
| Rejected ballots | | 2 | 0.11 | |
| Registered electors | | 4,272 | | |
| Conservative hold | | Swing | | |

=== Calne South ===
Calne South
| Party | Candidate | Votes | % | ±% |
|---|---|---|---|---|
| Liberal Democrats | Sam Pearce-Kearney* | 900 | 66.91 | +7.51 |
| Reform | Siggy Wilberg | 264 | 19.63 | N/A |
| Conservative | Rose Hoskins | 152 | 11.30 | –26.19 |
| Labour | Tara Fisher | 29 | 2.16 | –0.94 |
| Majority | | 636 | 47.29 | +25.38 |
| Turnout | | 1,348 | 37.57 | –7.93 |
| Rejected ballots | | 3 | 0.22 | |
| Registered electors | | 3,588 | | |
| Liberal Democrats hold | | Swing | | |

=== Chippenham Cepen Park and Derriads ===
Chippenham Cepen Park and Derriads
| Party | Candidate | Votes | % | ±% |
|---|---|---|---|---|
| Liberal Democrats | Eric Wakeman | 693 | 45.56 | +19.36 |
| Conservative | Nic Puntis* | 498 | 32.74 | –12.60 |
| Reform | Guy Thomas | 285 | 18.74 | N/A |
| Labour Co-op | Ian Flower | 45 | 2.96 | N/A |
| Majority | | 195 | 12.82 | N/A |
| Turnout | | 1,528 | 37.49 | –0.46 |
| Rejected ballots | | 7 | 0.46 | |
| Registered electors | | 4,076 | | |
| Liberal Democrats gain from Conservative | | Swing | | |

=== Chippenham Cepen Park and Hunters Moon ===
Chippenham Cepen Park and Hunters Moon
| Party | Candidate | Votes | % | ±% |
|---|---|---|---|---|
| Liberal Democrats | Matt Bragg | 646 | 43.15 | +19.93 |
| Conservative | Michael Owen | 468 | 31.26 | –21.58 |
| Reform | Allan Massie | 332 | 22.18 | N/A |
| Labour | Josh Morea | 51 | 3.41 | N/A |
| Majority | | 178 | 11.89 | N/A |
| Turnout | | 1,509 | 35.90 | –4.37 |
| Rejected ballots | | 12 | 0.80 | |
| Registered electors | | 4,203 | | |
| Liberal Democrats gain from Conservative | | Swing | | |

=== Chippenham Hardenhuish ===
Chippenham Hardenhuish
| Party | Candidate | Votes | % | ±% |
|---|---|---|---|---|
| Liberal Democrats | Kathryn MacDermid* | 675 | 55.24 | +3.73 |
| Conservative | Robert Giles | 249 | 20.38 | –8.59 |
| Reform | Peter Carr | 233 | 19.07 | N/A |
| Labour | Julie Lawrence | 65 | 5.32 | N/A |
| Majority | | 426 | 34.86 | +12.32 |
| Turnout | | 1,228 | 30.03 | –9.47 |
| Rejected ballots | | 6 | 0.49 | |
| Registered electors | | 4,089 | | |
| Liberal Democrats hold | | Swing | | |

=== Chippenham Hardens and Central ===
Chippenham Hardens and Central
| Party | Candidate | Votes | % | ±% |
|---|---|---|---|---|
| Liberal Democrats | Liz Alstrom* | 905 | 62.07 | +5.06 |
| Reform | Jeremy Young | 259 | 17.76 | N/A |
| Conservative | David Budd | 145 | 9.95 | –15.29 |
| Green | Ron Zahl | 71 | 4.87 | N/A |
| Independent | Ed Deedigan | 41 | 2.81 | N/A |
| Labour | Ruby Eggleton | 37 | 2.54 | N/A |
| Majority | | 646 | 44.31 | +12.54 |
| Turnout | | 1,465 | 35.93 | –5.78 |
| Rejected ballots | | 7 | 0.48 | |
| Registered electors | | 4,077 | | |
| Liberal Democrats hold | | Swing | | |

=== Chippenham Lowden and Rowden ===
Chippenham Lowden and Rowden
| Party | Candidate | Votes | % | ±% |
|---|---|---|---|---|
| Liberal Democrats | Ross Henning* | 441 | 42.20 | +2.24 |
| Independent | David Poole | 304 | 29.09 | –4.21 |
| Reform | Rob Kitchen | 144 | 13.78 | N/A |
| Conservative | Thomas Boden | 74 | 7.08 | –19.65 |
| Green | Thom MacCallum | 63 | 6.03 | N/A |
| Labour | Stephen Agar | 19 | 1.82 | N/A |
| Majority | | 137 | 13.11 | +6.44 |
| Turnout | | 1,052 | 36.41 | –6.92 |
| Rejected ballots | | 7 | 0.67 | |
| Registered electors | | 2,889 | | |
| Liberal Democrats hold | | Swing | | |

=== Chippenham Monkton ===
Chippenham Monkton
| Party | Candidate | Votes | % | ±% |
|---|---|---|---|---|
| Independent | Nick Murry* | 640 | 63.43 | –18.33 |
| Liberal Democrats | Chris Higman | 155 | 15.36 | N/A |
| Reform | Jodie Collier | 139 | 13.78 | N/A |
| Conservative | Tyler Scott | 75 | 7.43 | –8.89 |
| Majority | | 485 | 48.07 | –17.36 |
| Turnout | | 1,011 | 44.32 | –14.37 |
| Rejected ballots | | 2 | 0.20 | |
| Registered electors | | 2,281 | | |
| Independent hold | | Swing | | |

=== Chippenham Pewsham ===
Chippenham Pewsham
| Party | Candidate | Votes | % | ±% |
|---|---|---|---|---|
| Liberal Democrats | Clare Cape* | 753 | 54.29 | –1.72 |
| Reform | Andrew Shewring | 392 | 28.26 | N/A |
| Conservative | Luke Dawson | 206 | 14.85 | –20.43 |
| Labour | Tim Gilmore | 36 | 2.60 | N/A |
| Majority | | 361 | 26.03 | |
| Turnout | | 1,396 | 36.85 | –0.32 |
| Rejected ballots | | 9 | 0.64 | |
| Registered electors | | 3,788 | | |
| Liberal Democrats hold | | Swing | | |

=== Chippenham Sheldon ===
Chippenham Sheldon
| Party | Candidate | Votes | % | ±% |
|---|---|---|---|---|
| Liberal Democrats | Adrian Foster* | 351 | 30.13 | –4.76 |
| Reform | Mike Walker | 279 | 23.95 | N/A |
| Green | Declan Baseley | 260 | 22.32 | N/A |
| Conservative | Patrick Cousins | 222 | 19.06 | –10.35 |
| Labour | Tom Tiner | 53 | 4.55 | N/A |
| Majority | | 72 | 6.18 | +0.70 |
| Turnout | | 1,169 | 28.89 | –1.91 |
| Rejected ballots | | 4 | 0.34 | |
| Registered electors | | 4,047 | | |
| Liberal Democrats hold | | Swing | | |

=== Corsham Ladbrook ===
Corsham Ladbrook
| Party | Candidate | Votes | % | ±% |
|---|---|---|---|---|
| Liberal Democrats | Ruth Hopkinson* | 844 | 57.65 | –1.98 |
| Reform | Michael Coats | 322 | 21.99 | N/A |
| Conservative | Richard Harker | 176 | 12.02 | –19.80 |
| Labour | Steve Abbott | 122 | 8.33 | N/A |
| Majority | | 522 | 35.66 | +7.85 |
| Turnout | | 1,466 | 34.95 | –8.96 |
| Rejected ballots | | 2 | 0.14 | |
| Registered electors | | 4,195 | | |
| Liberal Democrats hold | | Swing | | |

=== Corsham Pickwick ===
Corsham Pickwick
| Party | Candidate | Votes | % | ±% |
|---|---|---|---|---|
| Liberal Democrats | Helen Belcher* | 906 | 61.67 | +10.63 |
| Reform | Julian Mitchell | 370 | 25.19 | N/A |
| Conservative | Jackie Simms | 193 | 13.14 | –25.96 |
| Majority | | 536 | 36.49 | +24.55 |
| Turnout | | 1,470 | 35.56 | –6.97 |
| Rejected ballots | | 1 | 0.07 | |
| Registered electors | | 4,134 | | |
| Liberal Democrats hold | | Swing | | |

=== Corsham Without ===
Corsham Without
| Party | Candidate | Votes | % | ±% |
|---|---|---|---|---|
| Liberal Democrats | Peter Wragg | 861 | 55.05 | +7.87 |
| Conservative | Annabelle Sanderson | 415 | 26.53 | –16.15 |
| Reform | Jerry Johnson-Wright | 288 | 18.41 | N/A |
| Majority | | 446 | 28.52 | +24.03 |
| Turnout | | 1,571 | 40.49 | –4.32 |
| Rejected ballots | | 7 | 0.45 | |
| Registered electors | | 3,880 | | |
| Liberal Democrats hold | | Swing | | |

=== Cricklade and Latton ===
Cricklade and Latton
| Party | Candidate | Votes | % | ±% |
|---|---|---|---|---|
| Liberal Democrats | Nick Dye* | 923 | 63.26 | +1.11 |
| Reform | Nigel Darvill | 305 | 20.90 | N/A |
| Conservative | Jack Davies | 231 | 15.83 | –22.02 |
| Majority | | 618 | 42.36 | +18.07 |
| Turnout | | 1,460 | 35.96 | –16.53 |
| Rejected ballots | | 1 | 0.07 | |
| Registered electors | | 4,060 | | |
| Liberal Democrats hold | | Swing | | |

Note: Nick Dye had previously held the seat for the Liberal Democrats in a 2024 by-election.

=== Devizes East ===
Devizes East
| Party | Candidate | Votes | % | ±% |
|---|---|---|---|---|
| Liberal Democrats | Taylor Wright | 526 | 35.76 | +13.68 |
| Conservative | Richard Oliver | 429 | 29.16 | –21.72 |
| Reform | Chris Plumb | 385 | 26.17 | N/A |
| Labour | Bill Wescott | 68 | 4.62 | –12.10 |
| Green | Samantha Drury Shore | 63 | 4.28 | –6.04 |
| Majority | | 97 | 6.59 | N/A |
| Turnout | | 1,476 | 34.54 | –1.81 |
| Rejected ballots | | 5 | 0.34 | |
| Registered electors | | 4,273 | | |
| Liberal Democrats gain from Conservative | | Swing | | |

=== Devizes North ===
Devizes North
| Party | Candidate | Votes | % | ±% |
|---|---|---|---|---|
| Liberal Democrats | Ben Reed | 443 | 34.42 | +25.34 |
| Conservative | Iain Wallis* | 368 | 28.59 | –13.97 |
| Reform | Nigel Bowler | 220 | 17.09 | N/A |
| Independent | Ian Hopkins | 200 | 15.54 | –6.96 |
| Green | Margaret Green | 56 | 4.35 | –7.78 |
| Majority | | 75 | 5.83 | N/A |
| Turnout | | 1,292 | 37.06 | –2.65 |
| Rejected ballots | | 5 | 0.39 | |
| Registered electors | | 3,486 | | |
| Liberal Democrats gain from Conservative | | Swing | | |

=== Devizes Rural West ===
Devizes Rural West
| Party | Candidate | Votes | % | ±% |
|---|---|---|---|---|
| Conservative | Tamara Reay* | 772 | 51.47 | –9.04 |
| Liberal Democrats | Mary Finch | 400 | 26.67 | N/A |
| Reform | Martin Catton | 328 | 21.87 | N/A |
| Majority | | 372 | 24.80 | –3.89 |
| Turnout | | 1,505 | 41.48 | –8.79 |
| Rejected ballots | | 5 | 0.33 | |
| Registered electors | | 3,628 | | |
| Conservative hold | | Swing | | |

=== Devizes South ===
Devizes South
| Party | Candidate | Votes | % | ±% |
|---|---|---|---|---|
| Conservative | Maria Hoult | 621 | 38.03 | –13.40 |
| Liberal Democrats | Declan Boore | 611 | 37.42 | +19.69 |
| Reform | Benjamin Parker | 276 | 16.90 | N/A |
| Labour | Cat Brown | 125 | 7.65 | –12.36 |
| Majority | | 10 | 0.61 | –30.81 |
| Turnout | | 1,635 | 42.67 | –2.70 |
| Rejected ballots | | 2 | 0.12 | |
| Registered electors | | 3,832 | | |
| Conservative hold | | Swing | | |

=== Downton and Ebble Valley ===
Downton and Ebble Valley
| Party | Candidate | Votes | % | ±% |
|---|---|---|---|---|
| Conservative | Richard Clewer* | 709 | 50.25 | –9.87 |
| Reform | Edward Kirk* | 320 | 22.68 | N/A |
| Liberal Democrats | Jonathan Cullis | 175 | 12.40 | +1.33 |
| Labour | Finn Anderson | 131 | 9.28 | –5.64 |
| Green | Andrew Mintram | 76 | 5.39 | –8.49 |
| Majority | | 389 | 27.57 | –17.63 |
| Turnout | | 1,411 | 35.94 | –5.59 |
| Rejected ballots | | 0 | 0.00 | |
| Registered electors | | 3,926 | | |
| Conservative hold | | Swing | | |

=== Durrington ===
Durrington
| Party | Candidate | Votes | % | ±% |
|---|---|---|---|---|
| Independent | Graham Wright* | 1,094 | 77.64 | –10.49 |
| Reform | Sarah Turner | 212 | 15.05 | N/A |
| Conservative | Lisa Brindley | 82 | 5.82 | –6.05 |
| Liberal Democrats | Nathan Keates | 21 | 1.49 | N/A |
| Majority | | 882 | 62.60 | –13.67 |
| Turnout | | 1,412 | 39.36 | –2.39 |
| Rejected ballots | | 3 | 0.21 | |
| Registered electors | | 3,587 | | |
| Independent hold | | Swing | | |

=== Ethandune ===
Ethandune
| Party | Candidate | Votes | % | ±% |
|---|---|---|---|---|
| Conservative | Mike Phillips | 553 | 39.44 | –27.16 |
| Liberal Democrats | Zeb Mackintosh | 466 | 33.24 | +20.50 |
| Reform | Asela Bandara | 383 | 27.32 | N/A |
| Majority | | 87 | 6.21 | –13.77 |
| Turnout | | 1,409 | 35.60 | –8.09 |
| Rejected ballots | | 7 | 0.50 | |
| Registered electors | | 3,958 | | |
| Conservative hold | | Swing | | |

=== Fovant and Chalke Valley ===
Fovant and Chalke Valley
| Party | Candidate | Votes | % | ±% |
|---|---|---|---|---|
| Conservative | Nabil Najjar* | 820 | 55.37 | –9.46 |
| Reform | Nigel Knowles | 360 | 24.31 | N/A |
| Liberal Democrats | Christine Stanway | 301 | 20.32 | +4.48 |
| Majority | | 460 | 31.06 | –14.44 |
| Turnout | | 1,483 | 40.99 | –4.00 |
| Rejected ballots | | 2 | 0.13 | |
| Registered electors | | 3,618 | | |
| Conservative hold | | Swing | | |

=== Hilperton ===
Hilperton
| Party | Candidate | Votes | % | ±% |
|---|---|---|---|---|
| Independent | Ernie Clark* | 961 | 70.71 | –7.28 |
| Conservative | Emily Denyer | 240 | 17.66 | +5.11 |
| Reform | Jaye Mason | 85 | 6.25 | N/A |
| Liberal Democrats | Colin Budd | 73 | 5.37 | N/A |
| Majority | | 721 | 53.05 | –12.59 |
| Turnout | | 1,365 | 38.75 | –5.91 |
| Rejected ballots | | 6 | 0.44 | |
| Registered electors | | 3,523 | | |
| Independent hold | | Swing | | |

=== Holt ===
Holt
| Party | Candidate | Votes | % | ±% |
|---|---|---|---|---|
| Liberal Democrats | Trevor Carbin* | 835 | 61.31 | +2.12 |
| Labour | Martha Anachury | 293 | 21.51 | N/A |
| Conservative | Kelly Holder | 168 | 12.33 | –19.97 |
| Reform | Belinda Jeng | 66 | 4.85 | N/A |
| Majority | | 542 | 39.79 | +12.90 |
| Turnout | | 1,365 | 36.54 | –9.91 |
| Rejected ballots | | 3 | 0.22 | |
| Registered electors | | 3,736 | | |
| Liberal Democrats hold | | Swing | | |

=== Kington ===
Kington
| Party | Candidate | Votes | % | ±% |
|---|---|---|---|---|
| Conservative | Howard Greenman* | 896 | 48.94 | –12.57 |
| Liberal Democrats | Ros Edwards | 563 | 30.75 | +15.49 |
| Reform | James Salkeld | 346 | 18.90 | N/A |
| Communist | Alex Hall | 26 | 1.42 | N/A |
| Majority | | 333 | 18.19 | –28.06 |
| Turnout | | 1,836 | 44.50 | –2.57 |
| Rejected ballots | | 5 | 0.27 | |
| Registered electors | | 4,126 | | |
| Conservative hold | | Swing | | |

=== Laverstock ===
Laverstock
| Party | Candidate | Votes | % | ±% |
|---|---|---|---|---|
| Liberal Democrats | Nick Baker | 863 | 44.67 | +39.55 |
| Conservative | Laura Jones | 694 | 35.92 | –1.92 |
| Reform | Tony Morland | 228 | 11.80 | N/A |
| Labour | Sheena King | 102 | 5.28 | –36.85 |
| Green | Hannah Mintram | 45 | 2.33 | –1.62 |
| Majority | | 169 | 8.75 | N/A |
| Turnout | | 1,937 | 43.51 | –3.92 |
| Rejected ballots | | 5 | 0.26 | |
| Registered electors | | 4,452 | | |
| Liberal Democrats gain from Labour | | Swing | | |

=== Ludgershall North and Rural ===
Ludgershall North and Rural
| Party | Candidate | Votes | % | ±% |
|---|---|---|---|---|
| Conservative | Christopher Williams* | 527 | 46.47 | –22.84 |
| Reform | Dean Roberts | 395 | 34.83 | N/A |
| Liberal Democrats | Malcolm Hewson | 212 | 18.69 | +3.51 |
| Majority | | 132 | 11.64 | –42.16 |
| Turnout | | 1,138 | 29.21 | –5.09 |
| Rejected ballots | | 4 | 0.35 | |
| Registered electors | | 3,896 | | |
| Conservative hold | | Swing | | |

=== Lyneham ===
Lyneham
| Party | Candidate | Votes | % | ±% |
|---|---|---|---|---|
| Conservative | Allison Bucknell* | 817 | 56.11 | –23.30 |
| Reform | Alan Bryant | 362 | 24.86 | N/A |
| Liberal Democrats | John Fairhurst | 170 | 11.68 | N/A |
| Labour | Sue Pitman | 62 | 4.26 | N/A |
| Green | Rachel Desborough | 45 | 3.09 | –9.74 |
| Majority | | 455 | 31.25 | –35.33 |
| Turnout | | 1,460 | 34.85 | –4.07 |
| Rejected ballots | | 4 | 0.27 | |
| Registered electors | | 4,189 | | |
| Conservative hold | | Swing | | |

=== Malmesbury ===
Malmesbury
| Party | Candidate | Votes | % | ±% |
|---|---|---|---|---|
| Liberal Democrats | Gavin Grant* | 1,000 | 62.34 | +5.11 |
| Reform | Richard Jones | 309 | 19.26 | N/A |
| Conservative | Ian Adkins | 150 | 9.35 | –21.83 |
| Green | Mike Elam | 143 | 8.92 | N/A |
| Majority | | 691 | 43.13 | +17.08 |
| Turnout | | 1,609 | 36.71 | –7.17 |
| Rejected ballots | | 5 | 0.31 | |
| Registered electors | | 4,383 | | |
| Liberal Democrats hold | | Swing | | |

=== Marlborough East ===
Marlborough East
| Party | Candidate | Votes | % | ±% |
|---|---|---|---|---|
| Liberal Democrats | Kymee Cleasby | 605 | 45.59 | +21.11 |
| Conservative | Caroline Thomas* | 487 | 36.70 | –17.08 |
| Reform | Nicholas Goldson | 235 | 17.71 | N/A |
| Majority | | 118 | 8.89 | N/A |
| Turnout | | 1,333 | 32.66 | –4.99 |
| Rejected ballots | | 6 | 0.45 | |
| Registered electors | | 4,081 | | |
| Liberal Democrats gain from Conservative | | Swing | | |

=== Marlborough West ===
Marlborough West
| Party | Candidate | Votes | % | ±% |
|---|---|---|---|---|
| Conservative | Jane Davies* | 770 | 49.04 | –14.13 |
| Liberal Democrats | Parvis Jamieson | 446 | 28.41 | +10.76 |
| Reform | Neil Baldock | 238 | 15.16 | N/A |
| Labour | Oliver Lang | 116 | 7.39 | –2.06 |
| Majority | | 324 | 20.64 | –24.88 |
| Turnout | | 1,571 | 35.37 | –7.48 |
| Rejected ballots | | 1 | 0.06 | |
| Registered electors | | 4,442 | | |
| Conservative hold | | Swing | | |

=== Melksham East ===
Melksham East
| Party | Candidate | Votes | % | ±% |
|---|---|---|---|---|
| Liberal Democrats | Charlie Stokes* | 383 | 39.90 | +15.59 |
| Reform | Angela Wallace | 262 | 27.29 | N/A |
| Conservative | Gillian Elson | 206 | 21.46 | –15.76 |
| Independent | Gary Fossey | 109 | 11.35 | N/A |
| Majority | | 121 | 12.60 | N/A |
| Turnout | | 964 | 23.35 | –3.18 |
| Rejected ballots | | 4 | 0.41 | |
| Registered electors | | 4,129 | | |
| Liberal Democrats gain from Conservative | | Swing | | |

=== Melksham Forest ===
Melksham Forest
| Party | Candidate | Votes | % | ±% |
|---|---|---|---|---|
| Liberal Democrats | Jennie Westbrook | 457 | 42.31 | +11.56 |
| Reform | Tracey Toomey | 332 | 30.74 | N/A |
| Conservative | Jack Oatley* | 218 | 20.19 | –8.86 |
| Green | Rachel Edwards | 73 | 6.76 | N/A |
| Majority | | 125 | 11.57 | N/A |
| Turnout | | 1,081 | 27.63 | –5.59 |
| Rejected ballots | | 1 | 0.09 | |
| Registered electors | | 3,912 | | |
| Liberal Democrats gain from Independent | | Swing | | |

=== Melksham South ===
Melksham South
| Party | Candidate | Votes | % | ±% |
|---|---|---|---|---|
| Independent | Jon Hubbard* | 362 | 28.75 | –20.08 |
| Conservative | Simon Crundell | 339 | 26.93 | –4.34 |
| Reform | Roderick Eaton | 331 | 26.29 | N/A |
| Liberal Democrats | Jenny Crossley | 172 | 13.66 | +1.05 |
| Green | Steve Petty | 55 | 4.37 | –2.92 |
| Majority | | 23 | 1.83 | –15.74 |
| Turnout | | 1,260 | 32.69 | –3.45 |
| Rejected ballots | | 1 | 0.08 | |
| Registered electors | | 3,854 | | |
| Independent hold | | Swing | | |

=== Melksham Without North and Shurnhold ===
Melksham Without North and Shurnhold
| Party | Candidate | Votes | % | ±% |
|---|---|---|---|---|
| Conservative | Phil Alford* | 645 | 49.81 | –14.45 |
| Liberal Democrats | Pat Aves | 388 | 29.96 | +10.97 |
| Reform | David Hathway | 262 | 20.23 | N/A |
| Majority | | 257 | 19.85 | –25.42 |
| Turnout | | 1,297 | 35.65 | –2.78 |
| Rejected ballots | | 2 | 0.15 | |
| Registered electors | | 3,638 | | |
| Conservative hold | | Swing | | |

=== Melksham Without West and Rural ===
Melksham Without West and Rural
| Party | Candidate | Votes | % | ±% |
|---|---|---|---|---|
| Liberal Democrats | Andrew Griffin | 567 | 36.18 | +18.23 |
| Conservative | Jonathon Seed* | 561 | 35.80 | –20.18 |
| Reform | Jon Leach | 357 | 22.78 | N/A |
| Green | Suzi Shingler | 82 | 5.23 | –9.96 |
| Majority | | 6 | 0.38 | N/A |
| Turnout | | 1,570 | 41.25 | –3.96 |
| Rejected ballots | | 3 | 0.19 | |
| Registered electors | | 3,806 | | |
| Liberal Democrats gain from Conservative | | Swing | | |

=== Mere ===
Mere
| Party | Candidate | Votes | % | ±% |
|---|---|---|---|---|
| Independent | George Jeans* | 1,101 | 64.27 | –8.44 |
| Reform | David Cordey | 237 | 13.84 | N/A |
| Conservative | Alex Channer | 184 | 10.74 | –2.58 |
| Green | John Jordan | 152 | 8.87 | +4.56 |
| Liberal Democrats | Victoria Charleston | 39 | 2.28 | N/A |
| Majority | | 864 | 50.44 | –8.94 |
| Turnout | | 1,718 | 46.50 | –4.97 |
| Rejected ballots | | 5 | 0.29 | |
| Registered electors | | 3,695 | | |
| Independent hold | | Swing | | |

=== Minety ===
Minety
| Party | Candidate | Votes | % | ±% |
|---|---|---|---|---|
| Conservative | Chuck Berry* | 664 | 41.45 | –25.42 |
| Liberal Democrats | Nichola Clifton | 598 | 37.33 | +24.91 |
| Reform | Victoria Carter | 293 | 18.29 | N/A |
| Green | Arthur McAuley | 47 | 2.93 | –7.29 |
| Majority | | 66 | 4.12 | –50.33 |
| Turnout | | 1,602 | 40.74 | –6.49 |
| Rejected ballots | | 0 | 0.00 | |
| Registered electors | | 3,932 | | |
| Conservative hold | | Swing | | |

=== Nadder Valley ===
Nadder Valley
| Party | Candidate | Votes | % | ±% |
|---|---|---|---|---|
| Conservative | Bridget Wayman* | 732 | 51.59 | –13.69 |
| Reform | Stephen Talbot | 303 | 21.35 | N/A |
| Liberal Democrats | Jill Caudle | 288 | 20.30 | +4.74 |
| Green | Cindy Moxham | 96 | 6.77 | –12.40 |
| Majority | | 429 | 30.23 | –14.32 |
| Turnout | | 1,422 | 39.01 | –5.54 |
| Rejected ballots | | 3 | 0.21 | |
| Registered electors | | 3,645 | | |
| Conservative hold | | Swing | | |

=== Old Sarum and Lower Bourne Valley ===
Old Sarum and Lower Bourne Valley
| Party | Candidate | Votes | % | ±% |
|---|---|---|---|---|
| Conservative | Lainey Barker | 505 | 33.18 | –14.30 |
| Reform | Steve Hastings | 487 | 32.00 | N/A |
| Labour | Sony Assuon | 248 | 16.29 | –15.91 |
| Liberal Democrats | Kevin Flynn | 220 | 14.45 | +3.97 |
| Green | Jacqui Bobby | 62 | 4.07 | –5.77 |
| Majority | | 18 | 1.18 | –14.09 |
| Turnout | | 1,523 | 30.76 | –5.39 |
| Rejected ballots | | 1 | 0.07 | |
| Registered electors | | 4,951 | | |
| Conservative hold | | Swing | | |

=== Pewsey ===
Pewsey
| Party | Candidate | Votes | % | ±% |
|---|---|---|---|---|
| Conservative | Jeremy Kunkler* | 805 | 54.54 | –4.70 |
| Reform | Keith Davis | 278 | 18.83 | N/A |
| Liberal Democrats | Dan Ahern | 163 | 11.04 | +6.92 |
| Green | Kate Silvester | 157 | 10.64 | +5.00 |
| Labour | Alfred Game | 73 | 4.95 | –11.15 |
| Majority | | 527 | 35.70 | –7.44 |
| Turnout | | 1,478 | 37.95 | –9.23 |
| Rejected ballots | | 2 | 0.14 | |
| Registered electors | | 3,895 | | |
| Conservative hold | | Swing | | |

=== Pewsey Vale East ===
Pewsey Vale East
| Party | Candidate | Votes | % | ±% |
|---|---|---|---|---|
| Conservative | Stuart Wheeler* | 768 | 52.60 | –13.76 |
| Reform | Christopher Garman | 293 | 20.07 | N/A |
| Liberal Democrats | Scarlet Bodman | 198 | 13.56 | –2.52 |
| Green | Christopher Larkin | 118 | 8.08 | –9.48 |
| Labour | Dulcie Nyberg | 83 | 5.68 | N/A |
| Majority | | 475 | 32.53 | –16.27 |
| Turnout | | 1,463 | 33.81 | –6.51 |
| Rejected ballots | | 3 | 0.21 | |
| Registered electors | | 4,327 | | |
| Conservative hold | | Swing | | |

=== Pewsey Vale West ===
Pewsey Vale West
| Party | Candidate | Votes | % | ±% |
|---|---|---|---|---|
| Conservative | Paul Oatway* | 897 | 57.32 | –10.83 |
| Reform | Ian Jack | 337 | 21.53 | N/A |
| Liberal Democrats | Nicola Middleton | 331 | 21.15 | +8.07 |
| Majority | | 560 | 35.78 | –13.59 |
| Turnout | | 1,570 | 38.32 | –3.27 |
| Rejected ballots | | 5 | 0.32 | |
| Registered electors | | 4,097 | | |
| Conservative hold | | Swing | | |

=== Purton ===
Purton
| Party | Candidate | Votes | % | ±% |
|---|---|---|---|---|
| Conservative | Jacqui Lay* | 723 | 48.95 | –19.96 |
| Liberal Democrats | Dawn Pursall | 477 | 32.30 | +18.04 |
| Reform | Michael Tenerife | 277 | 18.75 | N/A |
| Majority | | 246 | 16.66 | –37.99 |
| Turnout | | 1,482 | 29.27 | –3.06 |
| Rejected ballots | | 5 | 0.34 | |
| Registered electors | | 5,063 | | |
| Conservative hold | | Swing | | |

=== Redlynch and Landford ===
Redlynch and Landford
| Party | Candidate | Votes | % | ±% |
|---|---|---|---|---|
| Conservative | Zoë Clewer* | 846 | 58.06 | +0.04 |
| Liberal Democrats | Martin Rosell | 267 | 18.33 | +1.12 |
| Reform | Peter Harrison | 257 | 17.64 | N/A |
| Green | Keith Slater | 87 | 5.97 | –8.61 |
| Majority | | 579 | 39.74 | –1.07 |
| Turnout | | 1,463 | 39.80 | –6.30 |
| Rejected ballots | | 6 | 0.41 | |
| Registered electors | | 3,676 | | |
| Conservative hold | | Swing | | |

=== Royal Wootton Bassett East ===
Royal Wootton Bassett East
| Party | Candidate | Votes | % | ±% |
|---|---|---|---|---|
| Liberal Democrats | Andrew Matthews | 544 | 36.73 | +14.57 |
| Conservative | Alison Broome | 530 | 35.79 | –28.33 |
| Reform | Denese Brooke-Harte | 344 | 23.23 | N/A |
| Labour | Adam Parfitt | 63 | 4.25 | –3.72 |
| Majority | | 14 | 0.95 | N/A |
| Turnout | | 1,488 | 38.71 | –2.59 |
| Rejected ballots | | 7 | 0.47 | |
| Registered electors | | 3,844 | | |
| Liberal Democrats gain from Conservative | | Swing | | |

=== Royal Wootton Bassett North ===
Royal Wootton Bassett North
| Party | Candidate | Votes | % | ±% |
|---|---|---|---|---|
| Liberal Democrats | Lianna Konig | 515 | 39.16 | +2.18 |
| Conservative | Mary Champion* | 372 | 28.29 | –20.97 |
| Reform | Janet Riches | 343 | 26.08 | N/A |
| Labour | Ron Bardwell | 57 | 4.33 | –4.18 |
| Green | Tony Clark | 28 | 2.13 | –3.12 |
| Majority | | 143 | 10.87 | N/A |
| Turnout | | 1,321 | 31.52 | –5.71 |
| Rejected ballots | | 6 | 0.45 | |
| Registered electors | | 4,191 | | |
| Liberal Democrats gain from Conservative | | Swing | | |

=== Royal Wootton Bassett South and West ===
Royal Wootton Bassett South and West
| Party | Candidate | Votes | % | ±% |
|---|---|---|---|---|
| Liberal Democrats | Martin Denz | 711 | 43.49 | –3.65 |
| Conservative | Tom McInerney | 519 | 31.74 | –13.13 |
| Reform | Kris Barlow | 329 | 20.12 | N/A |
| Labour | Heather Reilly-Edwards | 76 | 4.65 | –3.34 |
| Majority | | 192 | 11.74 | +9.43 |
| Turnout | | 1,641 | 36.03 | –8.89 |
| Rejected ballots | | 6 | 0.37 | |
| Registered electors | | 4,555 | | |
| Liberal Democrats hold | | Swing | | |

=== Salisbury Bemerton Heath ===
Salisbury Bemerton Heath
| Party | Candidate | Votes | % | ±% |
|---|---|---|---|---|
| Reform | Ed Rimmer | 269 | 34.66 | N/A |
| Liberal Democrats | Richard Johnson | 219 | 28.22 | +16.90 |
| Labour | Caroline Corbin* | 190 | 24.48 | –23.74 |
| Conservative | Jonathan Price | 76 | 9.79 | –26.25 |
| Green | Safia Wyles | 22 | 2.84 | –1.59 |
| Majority | | 50 | 6.44 | N/A |
| Turnout | | 784 | 21.00 | –7.28 |
| Rejected ballots | | 8 | 1.02 | |
| Registered electors | | 3,733 | | |
| Reform gain from Labour | | Swing | | |

=== Salisbury Fisherton and Bemerton Village ===
Salisbury Fisherton and Bemerton Village
| Party | Candidate | Votes | % | ±% |
|---|---|---|---|---|
| Labour | Ricky Rogers* | 378 | 29.21 | –9.15 |
| Conservative | Mary Douglas | 361 | 27.90 | –6.36 |
| Reform | James Harvey | 312 | 24.11 | N/A |
| Green | Alex Raws | 124 | 9.58 | –7.18 |
| Liberal Democrats | Samuel Foster | 119 | 9.20 | +2.37 |
| Majority | | 17 | 1.31 | –2.79 |
| Turnout | | 1,302 | 30.68 | –8.07 |
| Rejected ballots | | 8 | 0.61 | |
| Registered electors | | 4,244 | | |
| Labour hold | | Swing | | |

=== Salisbury Harnham East ===
Salisbury Harnham East
| Party | Candidate | Votes | % | ±% |
|---|---|---|---|---|
| Conservative | Sven Hocking* | 538 | 36.35 | –2.19 |
| Liberal Democrats | Mac Brown | 414 | 27.97 | +5.10 |
| Labour | Ian Tomes | 235 | 15.88 | –8.85 |
| Reform | Mandy Cowley | 216 | 14.59 | N/A |
| Green | Rick Page | 77 | 5.20 | –8.66 |
| Majority | | 124 | 8.38 | –5.42 |
| Turnout | | 1,488 | 38.27 | –7.56 |
| Rejected ballots | | 8 | 0.54 | |
| Registered electors | | 3,888 | | |
| Conservative hold | | Swing | | |

=== Salisbury Harnham West ===
Salisbury Harnham West
| Party | Candidate | Votes | % | ±% |
|---|---|---|---|---|
| Liberal Democrats | Brian Dalton* | 722 | 52.51 | +8.09 |
| Conservative | Andrew Suddards | 346 | 25.16 | –4.86 |
| Reform | Frances Howard | 211 | 15.35 | N/A |
| Labour | Gillian Tunney | 96 | 6.98 | +0.77 |
| Majority | | 376 | 27.35 | +12.94 |
| Turnout | | 1,388 | 39.66 | –10.79 |
| Rejected ballots | | 13 | 0.94 | |
| Registered electors | | 3,500 | | |
| Liberal Democrats hold | | Swing | | |

=== Salisbury Milford ===
Salisbury Milford
| Party | Candidate | Votes | % | ±% |
|---|---|---|---|---|
| Liberal Democrats | Alan Bayliss | 657 | 43.86 | +15.78 |
| Conservative | Mel Green | 359 | 23.97 | –17.01 |
| Reform | Simon Lever | 271 | 18.09 | N/A |
| Labour | Patricia Podger | 130 | 8.68 | –8.73 |
| Green | Stephen Hackett | 81 | 5.41 | –8.12 |
| Majority | | 298 | 19.89 | N/A |
| Turnout | | 1,505 | 35.17 | –6.26 |
| Rejected ballots | | 7 | 0.47 | |
| Registered electors | | 4,279 | | |
| Liberal Democrats gain from Conservative | | Swing | | |

=== Salisbury St Edmund's ===
Salisbury St Edmund's
| Party | Candidate | Votes | % | ±% |
|---|---|---|---|---|
| Liberal Democrats | Paul Sample* | 750 | 52.56 | –0.96 |
| Conservative | Robert Richards | 213 | 14.93 | –10.92 |
| Reform | James McEwan | 200 | 14.02 | N/A |
| Labour | Bob Gann | 162 | 11.35 | +2.44 |
| Green | Kester Clark | 102 | 7.15 | –4.57 |
| Majority | | 537 | 37.63 | +9.96 |
| Turnout | | 1,439 | 34.36 | –18.82 |
| Rejected ballots | | 12 | 0.83 | |
| Registered electors | | 4,188 | | |
| Liberal Democrats hold | | Swing | | |

=== Salisbury St Francis and Stratford ===
Salisbury St Francis and Stratford
| Party | Candidate | Votes | % | ±% |
|---|---|---|---|---|
| Independent | John Wells | 487 | 27.44 | N/A |
| Conservative | Mark McClelland* | 371 | 20.90 | –22.63 |
| Independent | Atiqul Hoque | 332 | 18.70 | N/A |
| Liberal Democrats | Robin Jackson | 328 | 18.48 | +2.35 |
| Reform | Lynda Gale | 205 | 11.55 | N/A |
| Green | Jason Tipler | 52 | 2.93 | –10.31 |
| Majority | | 116 | 6.54 | N/A |
| Turnout | | 1,796 | 44.77 | –5.15 |
| Rejected ballots | | 21 | 1.17 | |
| Registered electors | | 4,012 | | |
| Independent gain from Conservative | | Swing | | |

=== Salisbury St Paul's ===
Salisbury St Paul's
| Party | Candidate | Votes | % | ±% |
|---|---|---|---|---|
| Conservative | Chris Taylor | 482 | 37.25 | +4.99 |
| Liberal Democrats | Sam Charleston* | 404 | 31.22 | +1.20 |
| Reform | Larry Pender | 194 | 14.99 | N/A |
| Labour | Lindsey Bellringer | 151 | 11.67 | –10.16 |
| Green | Andrew Mallory | 63 | 4.87 | –11.02 |
| Majority | | 78 | 6.03 | +3.79 |
| Turnout | | 1,299 | 32.55 | –4.55 |
| Rejected ballots | | 5 | 0.38 | |
| Registered electors | | 3,991 | | |
| Conservative hold | | Swing | | |

Note: Sam Charleston had previously gained the seat for the Liberal Democrats in a 2022 by-election.

=== Sherston ===
Sherston
| Party | Candidate | Votes | % | ±% |
|---|---|---|---|---|
| Liberal Democrats | Martin Smith* | 954 | 51.21 | +1.94 |
| Conservative | Sue Godwin | 562 | 30.17 | –14.37 |
| Reform | Rosie Clark | 310 | 16.64 | N/A |
| Labour | Jackie Muggleton | 37 | 1.99 | –4.20 |
| Majority | | 392 | 21.04 | +16.11 |
| Turnout | | 1,865 | 43.10 | –7.19 |
| Rejected ballots | | 2 | 0.11 | |
| Registered electors | | 4,327 | | |
| Liberal Democrats hold | | Swing | | |

=== Southwick ===
Southwick
| Party | Candidate | Votes | % | ±% |
|---|---|---|---|---|
| Reform | Chris Brautigam | 445 | 38.40 | N/A |
| Conservative | Daniel Butler | 421 | 36.32 | –35.99 |
| Liberal Democrats | Darren Vine | 293 | 25.28 | +11.15 |
| Majority | | 24 | 2.07 | N/A |
| Turnout | | 1,161 | 34.24 | –9.02 |
| Rejected ballots | | 2 | 0.17 | |
| Registered electors | | 3,391 | | |
| Reform gain from Conservative | | Swing | | |

=== The Lavingtons ===
The Lavingtons
| Party | Candidate | Votes | % | ±% |
|---|---|---|---|---|
| Conservative | Dominic Muns* | 798 | 48.25 | –11.70 |
| Liberal Democrats | Alex Rose | 478 | 28.90 | +16.61 |
| Reform | Teresa Hathway | 239 | 14.45 | N/A |
| Green | Catherine Read | 139 | 8.40 | –12.11 |
| Majority | | 320 | 19.35 | –19.69 |
| Turnout | | 1,655 | 44.68 | +0.86 |
| Rejected ballots | | 1 | 0.06 | |
| Registered electors | | 3,704 | | |
| Conservative hold | | Swing | | |

=== Tidworth East and Ludgershall South ===
Tidworth East and Ludgershall South
| Party | Candidate | Votes | % | ±% |
|---|---|---|---|---|
| Reform | Dave Lumsden | 377 | 50.13 | N/A |
| Conservative | Anthony Pickernell* | 238 | 31.65 | –38.07 |
| Liberal Democrats | Josh Charles | 80 | 10.64 | N/A |
| Green | Teresa Thornton | 57 | 7.58 | –4.10 |
| Majority | | 139 | 18.48 | N/A |
| Turnout | | 752 | 17.65 | –1.70 |
| Rejected ballots | | 0 | 0.00 | |
| Registered electors | | 4,260 | | |
| Reform gain from Conservative | | Swing | | |

=== Tidworth North and West ===
Tidworth North and West
| Party | Candidate | Votes | % | ±% |
|---|---|---|---|---|
| Reform | Keith Allen | 292 | 46.72 | N/A |
| Conservative | Johnny Hathaway-White | 154 | 24.64 | –53.42 |
| Independent | Brian Pratt | 111 | 17.76 | N/A |
| Liberal Democrats | Liz Cook | 64 | 10.24 | N/A |
| Independent | Andy Edwards | 4 | 0.64 | N/A |
| Majority | | 138 | 22.08 | N/A |
| Turnout | | 626 | 16.31 | –1.93 |
| Rejected ballots | | 1 | 0.16 | |
| Registered electors | | 3,838 | | |
| Reform gain from Conservative | | Swing | | |

=== Till Valley ===
Till Valley
| Party | Candidate | Votes | % | ±% |
|---|---|---|---|---|
| Conservative | Kevin Daley* | 609 | 42.53 | –15.27 |
| Reform | Lawrence Bryant | 400 | 27.93 | N/A |
| Liberal Democrats | Louise Barltrop | 357 | 24.93 | –5.30 |
| Heritage | Jake Williams | 66 | 4.61 | N/A |
| Majority | | 209 | 14.59 | –12.97 |
| Turnout | | 1,441 | 35.55 | –8.59 |
| Rejected ballots | | 9 | 0.62 | |
| Registered electors | | 4,054 | | |
| Conservative hold | | Swing | | |

=== Tisbury ===
Tisbury
| Party | Candidate | Votes | % | ±% |
|---|---|---|---|---|
| Liberal Democrats | Gerry Murray | 802 | 58.37 | +10.77 |
| Reform | Stephen Miles | 302 | 21.98 | N/A |
| Conservative | Haj Muntz | 270 | 19.65 | –14.14 |
| Majority | | 500 | 36.39 | –9.17 |
| Turnout | | 1,379 | 38.29 | –7.27 |
| Rejected ballots | | 5 | 0.36 | |
| Registered electors | | 3,601 | | |
| Liberal Democrats hold | | Swing | | |

=== Trowbridge Adcroft ===
Trowbridge Adcroft
| Party | Candidate | Votes | % | ±% |
|---|---|---|---|---|
| Liberal Democrats | Eunja Palmen | 499 | 37.24 | –0.07 |
| Reform | Teresa Hall | 420 | 31.34 | N/A |
| Conservative | Jusna Dunlop | 338 | 25.22 | –23.66 |
| Labour | Jacqueline Harding | 83 | 6.19 | –2.90 |
| Majority | | 79 | 5.90 | N/A |
| Turnout | | 1,352 | 32.52 | –3.12 |
| Rejected ballots | | 12 | 0.89 | |
| Registered electors | | 4,157 | | |
| Liberal Democrats gain from Conservative | | Swing | | |

=== Trowbridge Central ===
Trowbridge Central
| Party | Candidate | Votes | % | ±% |
|---|---|---|---|---|
| Liberal Democrats | Stewart Palmen* | 556 | 42.25 | +1.39 |
| Reform | Sebastian Chambers | 343 | 26.06 | N/A |
| Labour | Michael Dooley | 171 | 12.99 | –6.63 |
| Conservative | Matthew Cox | 147 | 11.17 | –18.05 |
| Green | Claire Murphy | 99 | 7.52 | –2.78 |
| Majority | | 213 | 16.19 | +4.55 |
| Turnout | | 1,324 | 27.81 | –3.96 |
| Rejected ballots | | 8 | 0.60 | |
| Registered electors | | 4,761 | | |
| Liberal Democrats hold | | Swing | | |

=== Trowbridge Drynham ===
Trowbridge Drynham
| Party | Candidate | Votes | % | ±% |
|---|---|---|---|---|
| Liberal Democrats | Denise Bates | 491 | 44.27 | +0.04 |
| Reform | Louis Eyers | 319 | 28.76 | N/A |
| Conservative | Stewart Benford | 248 | 22.36 | –28.37 |
| Labour | Alexandros Douvos | 51 | 4.60 | N/A |
| Majority | | 172 | 15.51 | N/A |
| Turnout | | 1,113 | 31.43 | |
| Rejected ballots | | 4 | 0.36 | |
| Registered electors | | 3,541 | | |
| Liberal Democrats gain from Conservative | | Swing | | |

=== Trowbridge Grove ===
Trowbridge Grove
| Party | Candidate | Votes | % | ±% |
|---|---|---|---|---|
| Liberal Democrats | Julie Vine | 485 | 38.49 | –3.17 |
| Reform | Katie Bastable | 306 | 24.29 | N/A |
| Conservative | David Halik | 269 | 21.35 | –17.76 |
| Labour Co-op | Emily Pomroy-Smith | 126 | 10.00 | –3.11 |
| Independent | James Ward | 74 | 5.87 | N/A |
| Majority | | 179 | 14.21 | +11.66 |
| Turnout | | 1,265 | 31.27 | –3.43 |
| Rejected ballots | | 5 | 0.40 | |
| Registered electors | | 4,045 | | |
| Liberal Democrats hold | | Swing | | |

=== Trowbridge Lambrok ===
Trowbridge Lambrok
| Party | Candidate | Votes | % | ±% |
|---|---|---|---|---|
| Liberal Democrats | Jo Trigg* | 855 | 63.29 | +0.74 |
| Reform | Mike Dew | 350 | 25.91 | N/A |
| Conservative | Em Underwood | 146 | 10.81 | –20.60 |
| Majority | | 505 | 37.38 | +6.24 |
| Turnout | | 1,353 | 33.57 | –3.32 |
| Rejected ballots | | 2 | 0.15 | |
| Registered electors | | 4,030 | | |
| Liberal Democrats hold | | Swing | | |

=== Trowbridge Park ===
Trowbridge Park
| Party | Candidate | Votes | % | ±% |
|---|---|---|---|---|
| Reform | Chris Vaughan | 350 | 33.11 | N/A |
| Conservative | Daniel Cave* | 335 | 31.69 | –22.51 |
| Liberal Democrats | David Cavill | 296 | 28.00 | +1.16 |
| Labour | Ben Morris | 77 | 7.28 | –3.79 |
| Majority | | 15 | 1.42 | N/A |
| Turnout | | 1,061 | 35.52 | +2.05 |
| Rejected ballots | | 4 | 0.38 | |
| Registered electors | | 2,987 | | |
| Reform gain from Conservative | | Swing | | |

=== Trowbridge Paxcroft ===
Trowbridge Paxcroft
| Party | Candidate | Votes | % | ±% |
|---|---|---|---|---|
| Liberal Democrats | Mel Jacob* | 554 | 44.21 | –9.68 |
| Reform | Lydia Wills | 378 | 30.17 | N/A |
| Conservative | Ashley Hutchinson | 241 | 19.23 | –26.88 |
| Green | Tom Culshaw | 80 | 6.38 | N/A |
| Majority | | 176 | 14.05 | +6.27 |
| Turnout | | 1,261 | 30.18 | –3.89 |
| Rejected ballots | | 8 | 0.63 | |
| Registered electors | | 4,178 | | |
| Liberal Democrats hold | | Swing | | |

=== Urchfont and Bishops Cannings ===
Urchfont and Bishops Cannings
| Party | Candidate | Votes | % | ±% |
|---|---|---|---|---|
| Conservative | Philip Whitehead* | 636 | 43.74 | –11.60 |
| Liberal Democrats | Alan Rankin | 420 | 28.89 | +0.82 |
| Reform | Michelle Turner | 398 | 27.37 | N/A |
| Majority | | 216 | 14.86 | –12.41 |
| Turnout | | 1,458 | 37.70 | –3.47 |
| Rejected ballots | | 4 | 0.27 | |
| Registered electors | | 3,867 | | |
| Conservative hold | | Swing | | |

=== Warminster Broadway ===
Warminster Broadway
| Party | Candidate | Votes | % | ±% |
|---|---|---|---|---|
| Conservative | Barry Pirie | 534 | 40.15 | –12.27 |
| Reform | Garry Irvin | 382 | 28.72 | N/A |
| Liberal Democrats | Martin Papworth | 316 | 23.76 | +12.37 |
| Green | Portia Williams | 98 | 7.37 | –5.33 |
| Majority | | 152 | 11.43 | –17.52 |
| Turnout | | 1,330 | 32.84 | –1.48 |
| Rejected ballots | | 0 | 0.00 | |
| Registered electors | | 4,050 | | |
| Conservative hold | | Swing | | |

=== Warminster East ===
Warminster East
| Party | Candidate | Votes | % | ±% |
|---|---|---|---|---|
| Conservative | Andrew Davis* | 458 | 33.31 | –11.71 |
| Reform | Aaron Scott | 412 | 29.96 | N/A |
| Independent | Paul MacDonald | 276 | 20.07 | –19.08 |
| Liberal Democrats | William Hawkins | 156 | 11.35 | +5.96 |
| Green | John Mellor | 73 | 5.31 | –5.13 |
| Majority | | 46 | 3.35 | –2.52 |
| Turnout | | 1,377 | 32.14 | –3.23 |
| Rejected ballots | | 2 | 0.15 | |
| Registered electors | | 4,284 | | |
| Conservative hold | | Swing | | |

=== Warminster North and Rural ===
Warminster North and Rural
| Party | Candidate | Votes | % | ±% |
|---|---|---|---|---|
| Conservative | Bill Parks* | 732 | 53.01 | –16.73 |
| Reform | Ray Andrews | 354 | 25.63 | N/A |
| Liberal Democrats | John Marsden | 295 | 21.36 | –8.90 |
| Majority | | 378 | 27.37 | –12.10 |
| Turnout | | 1,383 | 31.70 | –1.36 |
| Rejected ballots | | 2 | 0.14 | |
| Registered electors | | 4,363 | | |
| Conservative hold | | Swing | | |

=== Warminster West ===
Warminster West
| Party | Candidate | Votes | % | ±% |
|---|---|---|---|---|
| Independent | Russell Hawker | 295 | 29.35 | N/A |
| Reform | Freddie Merrett | 293 | 29.15 | N/A |
| Conservative | Pip Ridout* | 274 | 27.26 | –33.47 |
| Liberal Democrats | Andrew Bryant | 143 | 14.23 | –0.47 |
| Majority | | 2 | 0.20 | N/A |
| Turnout | | 1,007 | 28.85 | –1.43 |
| Rejected ballots | | 2 | 0.20 | |
| Registered electors | | 3,491 | | |
| Independent gain from Conservative | | Swing | | |

=== Westbury East ===
Westbury East
| Party | Candidate | Votes | % | ±% |
|---|---|---|---|---|
| Liberal Democrats | Gordon King* | 672 | 54.59 | –8.27 |
| Reform | Jim Quinn | 336 | 27.29 | N/A |
| Conservative | Marek Grzegorczyk | 155 | 12.59 | –16.69 |
| Green | Sarah Wiseman | 68 | 5.52 | N/A |
| Majority | | 336 | 27.29 | –6.29 |
| Turnout | | 1,232 | 29.44 | –12.19 |
| Rejected ballots | | 1 | 0.08 | |
| Registered electors | | 4,185 | | |
| Liberal Democrats hold | | Swing | | |

=== Westbury North ===
Westbury North
| Party | Candidate | Votes | % | ±% |
|---|---|---|---|---|
| Reform | Boaz Barry | 445 | 43.80 | N/A |
| Liberal Democrats | Carole King* | 389 | 38.29 | –21.51 |
| Conservative | Lewis Wakeford | 104 | 10.24 | –18.06 |
| Labour | Michael Sutton | 78 | 7.68 | N/A |
| Majority | | 56 | 5.51 | N/A |
| Turnout | | 1,018 | 27.23 | –0.69 |
| Rejected ballots | | 2 | 0.20 | |
| Registered electors | | 3,739 | | |
| Reform gain from Liberal Democrats | | Swing | | |

=== Westbury West ===
Westbury West
| Party | Candidate | Votes | % | ±% |
|---|---|---|---|---|
| Reform | Robert Smith | 377 | 37.29 | N/A |
| Independent | Matthew Dean* | 271 | 26.81 | –25.22 |
| Labour | Jane Russ | 139 | 13.75 | –0.16 |
| Liberal Democrats | Stephen Cooper | 113 | 11.18 | +1.15 |
| Conservative | Benjamin Owen | 111 | 10.98 | –13.05 |
| Majority | | 106 | 10.48 | N/A |
| Turnout | | 1,012 | 22.67 | –5.37 |
| Rejected ballots | | 1 | 0.10 | |
| Registered electors | | 4,464 | | |
| Reform gain from Independent | | Swing | | |

=== Wilton ===
Wilton
| Party | Candidate | Votes | % | ±% |
|---|---|---|---|---|
| Conservative | Pauline Church* | 549 | 40.46 | –12.60 |
| Liberal Democrats | Peter Edge | 536 | 39.50 | +4.60 |
| Reform | Bev Hastings | 205 | 15.11 | N/A |
| Labour | Terry Hudson | 67 | 4.94 | –0.87 |
| Majority | | 13 | 0.96 | –17.20 |
| Turnout | | 1,359 | 36.54 | –6.92 |
| Rejected ballots | | 2 | 0.15 | |
| Registered electors | | 3,719 | | |
| Conservative hold | | Swing | | |

=== Winsley and Westwood ===
Winsley and Westwood
| Party | Candidate | Votes | % | ±% |
|---|---|---|---|---|
| Liberal Democrats | Nigel White | 852 | 47.20 | +1.12 |
| Conservative | Clive Hilton | 556 | 30.80 | –23.12 |
| Reform | Ursula Dyer | 247 | 13.68 | N/A |
| Green | Sarah Kearney | 150 | 8.31 | N/A |
| Majority | | 296 | 16.40 | N/A |
| Turnout | | 1,808 | 45.68 | –10.71 |
| Rejected ballots | | 3 | 0.17 | |
| Registered electors | | 3,958 | | |
| Liberal Democrats gain from Conservative | | Swing | | |

=== Winterslow and Upper Bourne Valley ===
Winterslow and Upper Bourne Valley
| Party | Candidate | Votes | % | ±% |
|---|---|---|---|---|
| Conservative | Rich Rogers* | 982 | 58.21 | +13.42 |
| Reform | Matthew Newman | 342 | 20.27 | N/A |
| Liberal Democrats | Geoffrey Searle | 262 | 15.53 | +9.52 |
| Green | Benny de Garis | 101 | 5.99 | +0.94 |
| Majority | | 640 | 37.94 | +30.74 |
| Turnout | | 1,688 | 40.16 | –13.69 |
| Rejected ballots | | 1 | 0.06 | |
| Registered electors | | 4,203 | | |
| Conservative hold | | Swing | | |

=== Wylye Valley ===
Wylye Valley
| Party | Candidate | Votes | % | ±% |
|---|---|---|---|---|
| Conservative | Christopher Newbury* | 837 | 54.10 | –12.16 |
| Reform | Nick Bowes | 315 | 20.36 | N/A |
| Liberal Democrats | Lesley Bennett | 231 | 14.93 | –1.18 |
| Green | Michal Jirku | 164 | 10.60 | –7.03 |
| Majority | | 522 | 33.74 | –14.89 |
| Turnout | | 1,550 | 40.88 | –5.75 |
| Rejected ballots | | 3 | 0.19 | |
| Registered electors | | 3,792 | | |
| Conservative hold | | Swing | | |

== Changes 2025–2029 ==
- January 2026: Russell Hawker, elected as an independent councillor for Warminster West, joined the Conservatives.
- August 2026: Ricky Rogers, elected as a Labour councillor for Salisbury Fisherton and Bemerton Village, was expelled from the Labour Party after forming a council group with independent councillor John Wells.

=== By-elections ===
==== Salisbury Milford ====
Liberal Democrat councillor Alan Bayliss resigned from the council, citing personal reasons. A by-election to fill the vacancy took place on 15 October 2026.

Salisbury Milford by-election, 15 October 2026
| Party | Candidate | Votes | % | ±% |
|---|---|---|---|---|
| Liberal Democrats | Mac Brown | 759 | 45.6 | +1.8 |
| Conservative | Laura Jones | 605 | 36.4 | +12.4 |
| Reform | Simon Lever | 189 | 11.4 | −6.7 |
| Labour | Sony Assuon | 110 | 6.6 | −2.1 |
| Majority | | 154 | 9.3 | −10.6 |
| Rejected ballots | | 10 | | |
| Turnout | | 1,673 | 40.3 | +5.2 |
| Registered electors | | 4,149 | | |
| Liberal Democrats hold | | Swing | ▼5.3 | |

== See also ==
- Wiltshire Council elections
