= 2025 United Kingdom local elections =

- 1 May 2025

1,641 council seats in England 23 county, unitary, and metropolitan councils in England 6 directly elected mayors in England 2 sui generis authorities in England
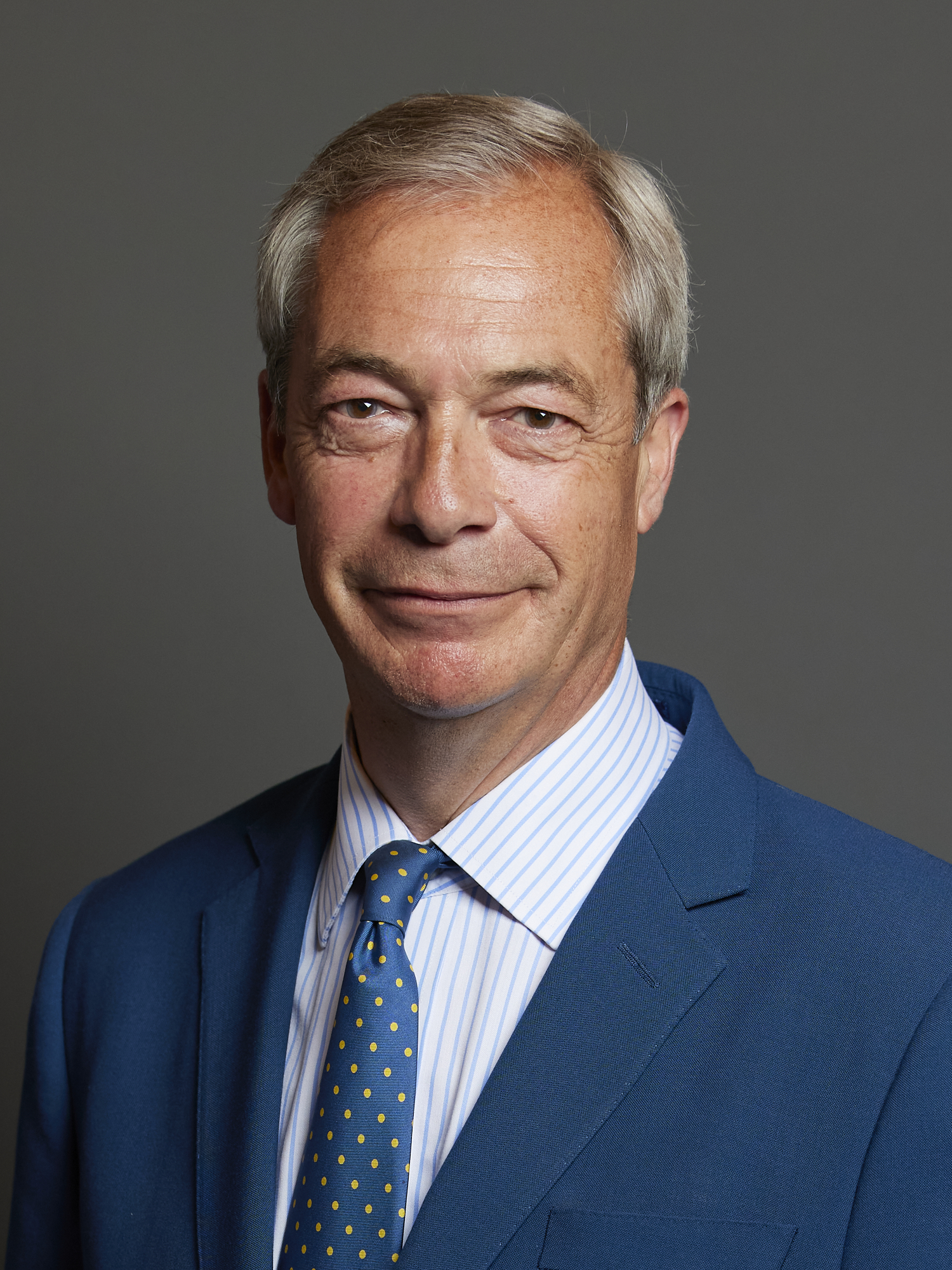

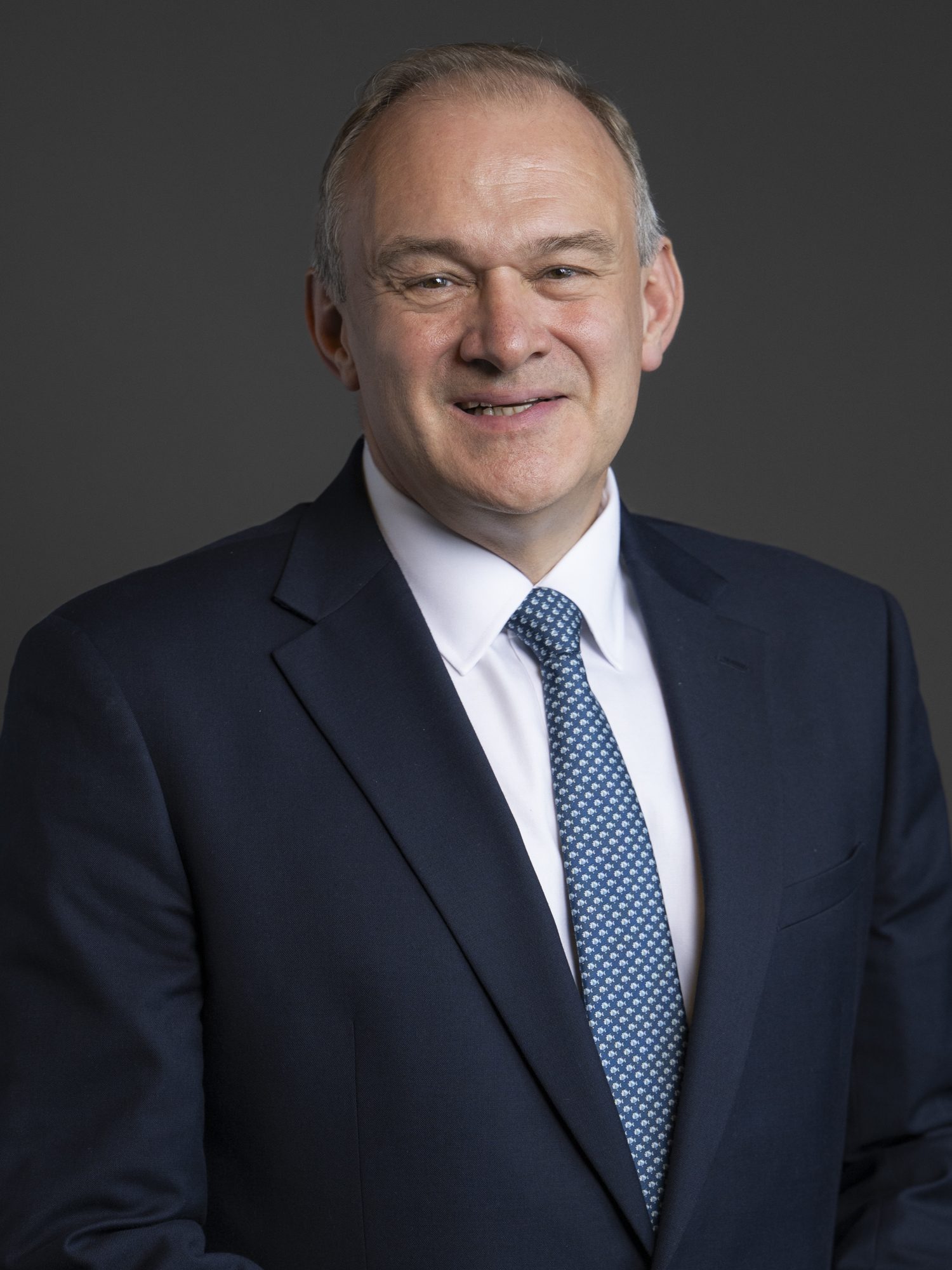

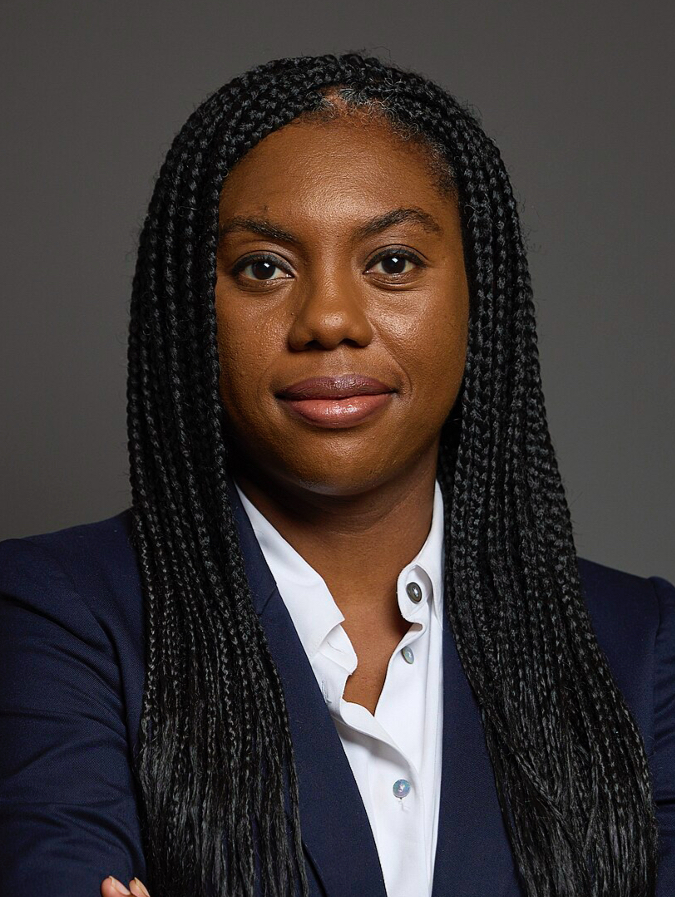

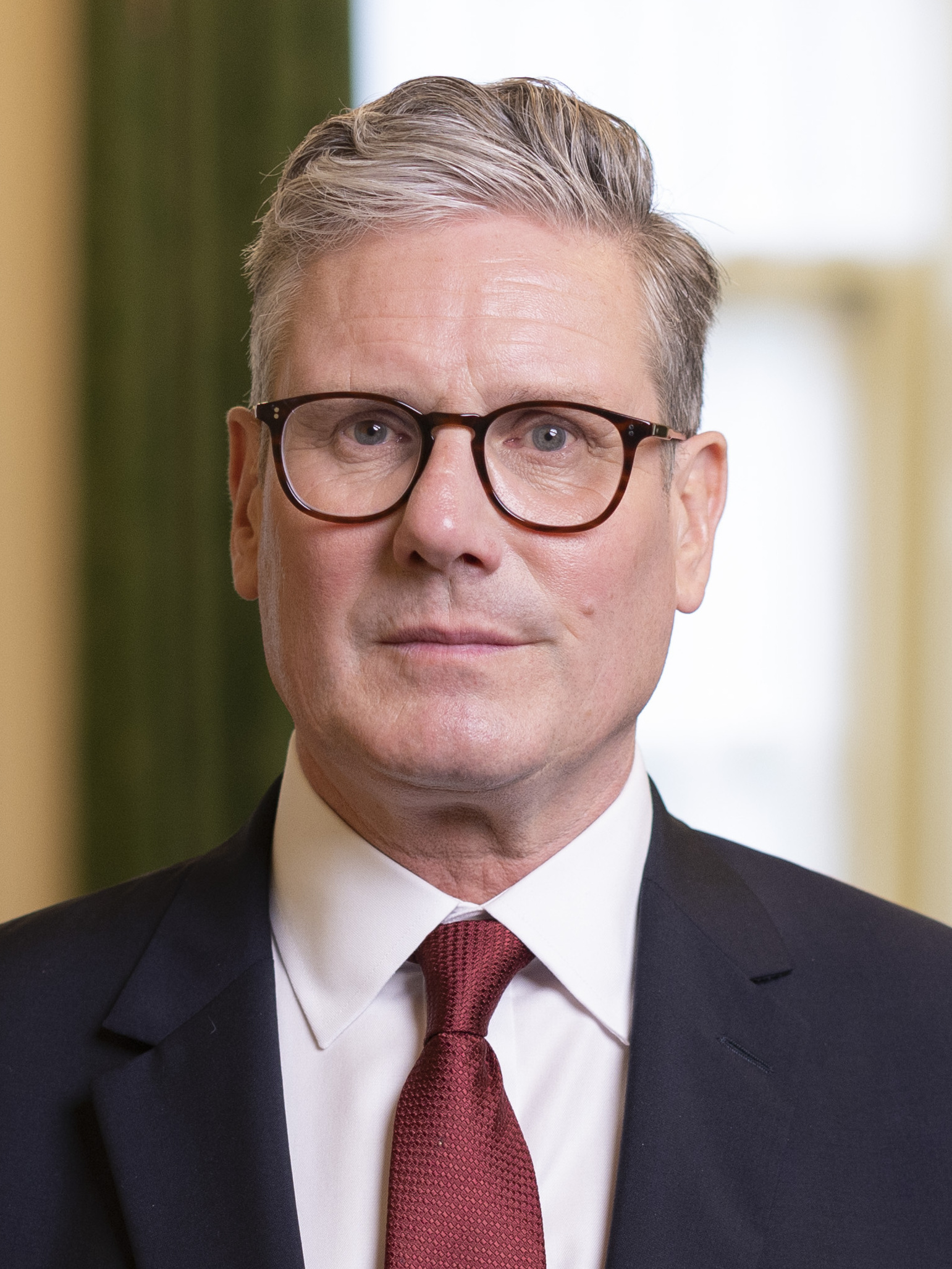

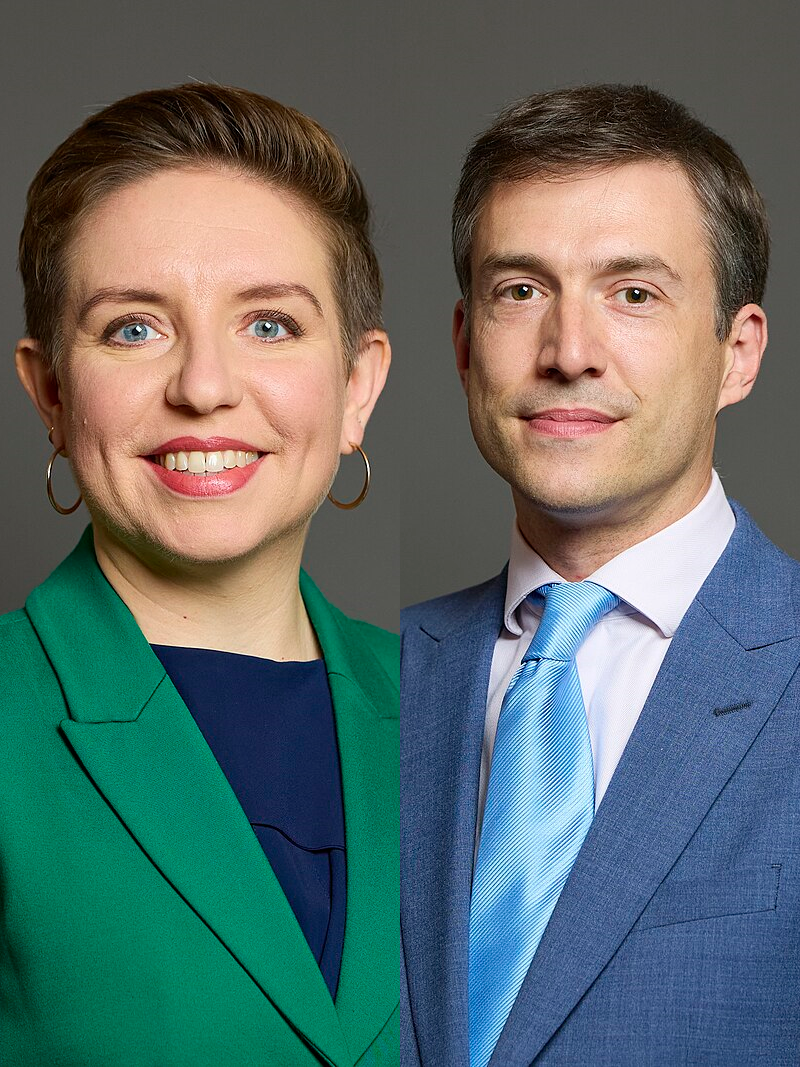
	First party	Second party	Third party
Leader	Nigel Farage	Ed Davey	Kemi Badenoch
Party	Reform	Liberal Democrats	Conservative
Leader since	3 June 2024	27 August 2020	2 November 2024
Seats before	128 seats 0 councils	3,009 seats 37 councils	5,034 seats 49 councils
Projected vote share (Note: All vote shares are projected national vote shares calculated by the BBC.)	30% ▲28 pp	17%	15% ▼10 pp
Seats won (2025)	677; 10 councils	370; 3 councils	319; 0 councils
Councillors (after)	804; 10 councils	3,197; 40 councils	4,403; 33 councils
Net change (notional)	▲677 ▲10 councils	▲163 ▲3 councils	▼674 ▼16 councils
	Fourth party	Fifth party
Leader	Keir Starmer	Carla Denyer and Adrian Ramsay
Party	Labour	Green
Leader since	4 April 2020	1 October 2021
Seats before	6,322 seats 154 councils	850 seats 1 council
Projected vote share	20% ▼14 pp	11% ▼2 pp
Seats won (2025)	98; 0 councils	79; 0 councils
Councillors (after)	6,124; 154 councils	895; 1 council
Net change (notional)	▼187 ▼1 council	▲44; 0 councils

Reform UK	Liberal Democrats	Labour
Conservative	No overall control

Local elections in the United Kingdom were held on 1 May 2025 for 1,641 English council seats in 24 local authorities. All seats on 14 county councils and eight unitary authorities in the United Kingdom were up for election. They were the first local elections to follow the 2024 general election. Most of these seats were last contested at the 2021 local elections. No local elections were held in the rest of the United Kingdom, with none held in Scotland, Wales or Northern Ireland.

There were also six mayoral elections, including the inaugural election for the mayor of Greater Lincolnshire, and the inaugural election for the mayor of Hull and East Yorkshire. The 2025 Runcorn and Helsby by-election was also held on 1 May. In addition, elections for the Council of the Isles of Scilly were held. The City of London Corporation held elections on 19 and 20 March.

The BBC described the elections as a "sweeping victory" for Reform UK: the party won 677 seats, increasing their total councillor number to 804. Reform thus held overall control in 10 local authorities. The governing Labour Party and opposition Conservative Party lost councillors ending with 6,177 and 4,403 councillors and overall control of 107 (-1) and 33 (-16) councils respectively. This was the first time that Labour finished fourth in a local election; it was the first set of elections under the premiership of Keir Starmer. There were gains for the Liberal Democrats who took overall control of three new councils (up to 37) and won more seats (370 new councillors to end with 3,197) than the Conservatives for the second local election in a row.

Some elections originally scheduled for 2025 have been delayed by up to a year while reorganisation takes place. The government announced that elections to nine councils would not take place in 2025 to allow restructuring, with elections to reformed or newly created replacement authorities taking place in 2026.

== Background ==
=== Significance of these elections ===
These elections were the first local elections to follow the general election held on 4 July 2024 which resulted in a landslide victory for the Labour Party. The combined vote share for Labour and the Conservatives reached a record low, with smaller parties doing well. Labour returned to being the largest party in Scotland and remained so in Wales. The election was noted as the most disproportionate in modern British history (i.e. Labour won 63% of seats with 34% of the vote), mainly as a result of the first-past-the-post voting system.

Keir Starmer won a landslide victory at the general election and became prime minister, but with the smallest share of the electoral vote of any majority government since record-keeping of the popular vote began in 1830. By the end of 2024, opinion polling for the Labour Party and Starmer's personal approval ratings had dropped significantly following several controversies including those regarding the abolition of Winter Fuel Payments and alleged trading of gifts for political influence, as well as a series of far-right anti-immigration riots fuelled by the perception that his government mishandled its response to the 2024 Southport stabbings, protests by farmers over a proposed new inheritance tax on their farms, and continued government support for Israel in the Gaza war. These controversies culminated in an online petition in November 2024 calling for an early general election reaching over 2 million signatures within 2 days.

On 2 November 2024, Kemi Badenoch won the 2024 Conservative leadership election to succeed Rishi Sunak as leader of the opposition. In a December 2024 interview, Badenoch said the public "kicked out" the Conservative Party because it was not trusted and did not deliver; she dismissed concerns that her approach of not having specific policy positions would leave a vacuum that could be filled by Reform UK; and she acknowledged the 2025 local elections would be difficult for her party. Nigel Farage's party Reform UK placed third in the share of the vote in the 2024 election and had MPs elected to the Commons for the first time. Farage and his party Reform UK did well in opinion polls at the expense of both Labour and the Conservatives.

Following the publication of the English Devolution White Paper on 16 December 2024, which set out the Labour government's plans for local government reorganisation, some of the elections scheduled for May 2025 will be delayed by up to a year while reorganisation takes place. County councils and unitary authorities had until 10 January 2025 to request to join the Government's Devolution Priority Programme and ask the Government to cancel or postpone their regularly scheduled elections. At least 13 of the 21 county councils asked the government to delay their elections. On 5 February 2025, the government announced that elections to nine councils (seven county councils and two unitary authorities) would not take place in 2025 to allow restructuring to take place, with elections to reformed or newly created replacement authorities taking place in 2026.

These were the third set of local elections held under the Elections Act 2022, a controversial voter identification law that requires voters to show photo ID when attending a polling station. This act also meant that the elections for directly-elected mayors would use the first-past-the-post voting system rather than the previously used supplementary vote system.

== Campaign ==
Map of councils with elections (excluding combined authority mayors) County Cancelled Unitary Sui generis (Note: City of London Corporation and Isles of Scilly Council) Metropolitan borough None

Aggregate seats contested by party
Party	Seats
Reform UK	1,624 / 1,641 (99%)
Conservative	1,595 / 1,641 (97%)
Labour	1,536 / 1,641 (94%)
Liberal Democrats	1,395 / 1,641 (85%)
Green	1,202 / 1,641 (73%)

=== Liberal Democrats ===
Ed Davey launched the Liberal Democrats' campaign on 17 March in Great Missenden. On 20 March the party's spring conference began in Harrogate.

Davey said he wanted to replace the Conservatives as the "party of Middle England".

=== Conservative ===
Kemi Badenoch launched the Conservative Party's campaign on 20 March at an event in Buckinghamshire. She warned activists of an "extremely difficult" challenge, and promised to bring "lower taxes and better services."

Badenoch suggested that Conservative Party councillors could form coalitions with Reform UK councillors, but Farage turned this suggestion down.

=== Reform UK ===
Nigel Farage launched the Reform UK campaign at an event on 28 March at Arena Birmingham. Reform contested nearly all the council seats and the six mayoral elections.

=== Labour ===
Prime Minister Keir Starmer launched the Labour Party campaign on 3 April at an event in Derbyshire.

=== Green ===
Carla Denyer launched the Green Party campaign on 8 April in Warwickshire.

== Results ==
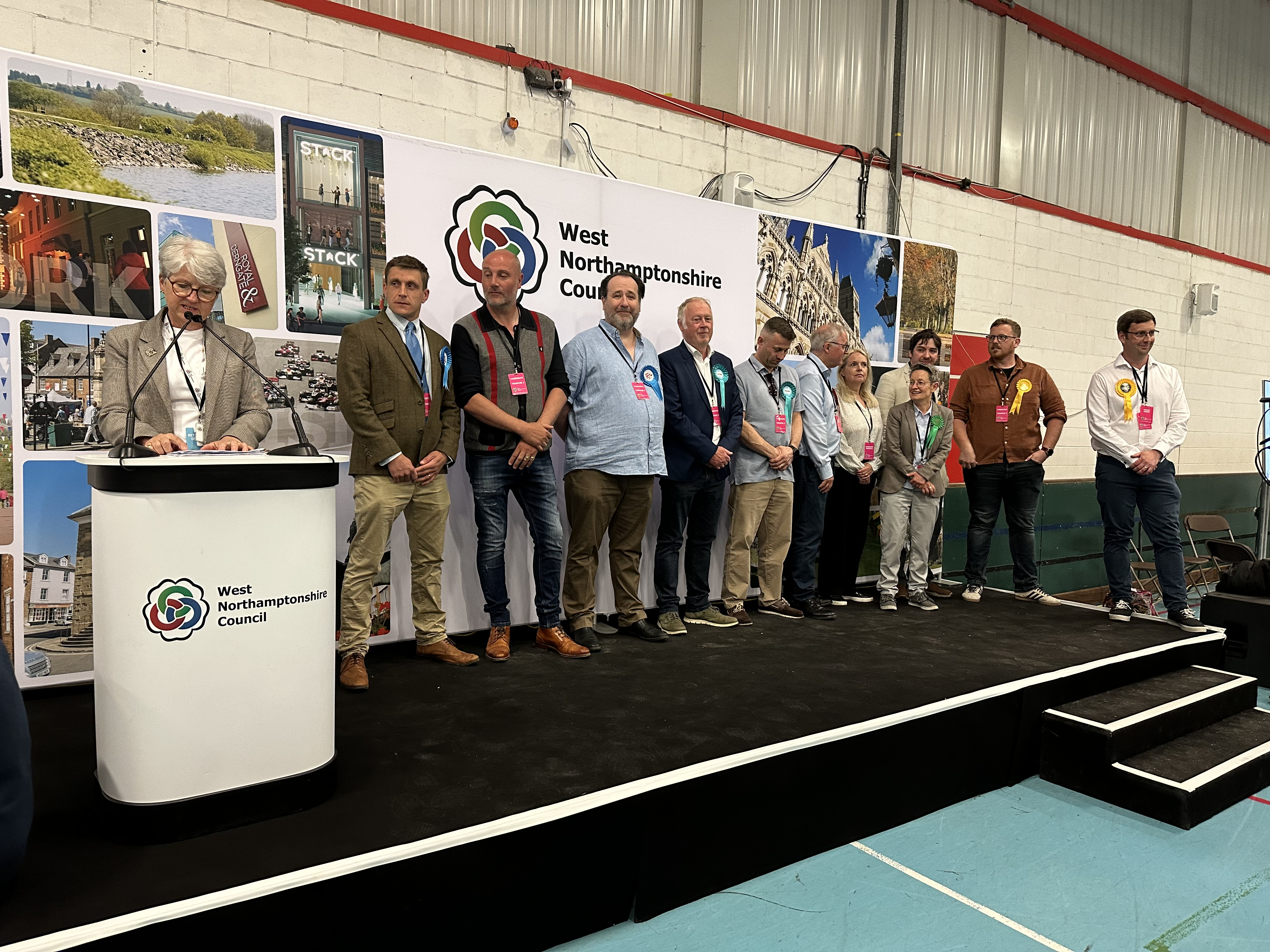
Declaration of the results of Towcester ward in West Northamptonshire, the final result of the 2025 local elections

=== Overall ===
The table below shows the results of these elections, along with the overall number of councillors in Great Britain for each party following the elections.

Party	Councillors			Councils		
Party	Won	After	+/− (Note: Because the number of council seats shifts every year due to boundary changes and local government reorganisation, changes are notional changes calculated by the BBC.)	Won	After	+/−
Reform	677	804	▲677	10	10	▲10
Liberal Democrats	370	3,197	▲163	3	40	▲3
Conservative	319	4,403	▼674	0	33	▼16
Labour	98	6,124	▼187	0	107	▼1
Green	79	895	▲44	0	1	Steady
SNP	—N/a (Note: There were no local elections in Scotland in 2025.)	418	Steady	—N/a	1	Steady
Plaid Cymru	—N/a (Note: There were no local elections in Wales in 2025.)	201	Steady	—N/a	3	Steady
Independent	94	2,546	▼23	0	11	Steady
No overall control	—N/a			10	162	▲4
Total	1,635	18,596	—	23	368	—

=== County councils ===
There are 21 county councils in England. All of them hold whole-council elections on a four-year cycle that includes 2025. However, 7 county councils (Norfolk, Suffolk, Essex, Surrey, East Sussex, West Sussex and Hampshire) had their elections postponed due to local government reorganisation. A total of 16 county councils applied for their elections to be postponed, though 9 (Derbyshire, Devon, Gloucestershire, Kent, Leicestershire, Lincolnshire, Oxfordshire, Warwickshire and Worcestershire) had this request rejected and their elections went ahead as planned, as these places were not part of the Devolution Priority Programme.

Council	Seats	Party control		Details
Council	Seats	Previous	Result	Details
Cambridgeshire	61	No overall control (Lib Dem–Lab–Ind coalition)	Liberal Democrats	Details
Derbyshire (Note: New electoral boundaries)	64	Conservative	Reform	Details
Devon	60	Conservative	No overall control (Lib Dem–Green coalition)	Details
Gloucestershire	55	Conservative	No overall control (Lib Dem minority)	Details
Hertfordshire	78	Conservative	No overall control (Lib Dem minority)	Details
Kent	81	Conservative	Reform	Details
Lancashire	84	Conservative	Reform	Details
Leicestershire	55	Conservative	No overall control (Reform UK minority)	Details
Lincolnshire	70	Conservative	Reform	Details
Nottinghamshire	66	Conservative	Reform	Details
Oxfordshire	69	No overall control (Lib Dem–Lab–Grn coalition)	Liberal Democrats	Details
Staffordshire	62	Conservative	Reform	Details
Warwickshire	57	Conservative	No overall control (Reform UK minority)	Details
Worcestershire	57	Conservative	No overall control (Reform UK minority)	Details

=== Metropolitan boroughs ===
Most metropolitan boroughs are elected by thirds across three years, with a fourth fallow year, which fell in 2025. However, City of Doncaster Council has been elected as a whole every four years from 2017, to coincide with the election of the Mayor of Doncaster.

Council	Seats	Party control		Details
Council	Seats	Previous	Result	Details
Doncaster	55	Labour	Reform	Details

=== Unitary authorities ===
There are 62 unitary authorities, which are single-tier local authorities. Ten of them were due to hold whole-council elections on a four-year cycle that includes 2025. However, Isle of Wight and Thurrock had their elections cancelled due to local government reorganisation. Owing to boundary changes, several authorities saw a significant reduction in the number of councillors elected: Buckinghamshire reduced from 147 to 97, Durham went from 126 to 98 and West Northamptonshire elected 76 instead of 93.

Council	Seats	Party control		Details
Council	Seats	Previous	Result	Details
Buckinghamshire	97	Conservative	No overall control (Con minority)	Details
Cornwall	87	Conservative	No overall control (Lib Dem–Ind coalition)	Details
County Durham	98	No overall control (Lib Dem–Con–Ind–North East Party coalition)	Reform	Details
North Northamptonshire	68	Conservative	Reform	Details
Northumberland	69	Conservative	No overall control (Con minority)	Details
Shropshire	74	Conservative	Liberal Democrats	Details
West Northamptonshire	76	Conservative	Reform	Details
Wiltshire	98	Conservative	No overall control (Lib Dem–Ind coalition)	Details

=== Combined authority mayors ===
Combined authority	Mayor before	Mayor after	Details
Cambridgeshire and Peterborough	Nik Johnson (Labour)	Paul Bristow (Conservative) gain	Details
West of England	Dan Norris (Independent, elected as Labour)	Helen Godwin (Labour) hold	Details
Greater Lincolnshire	None, inaugural election	Andrea Jenkyns (Reform UK) new	Details
Hull and East Yorkshire	None, inaugural election	Luke Campbell (Reform UK) new	Details

=== Single-authority mayors ===
Local Authority	Previous Mayor	Mayor-elect	Details
Doncaster	Ros Jones (Labour)	Ros Jones (Labour) hold	Details
North Tyneside	Norma Redfearn (Labour)	Karen Clark (Labour) hold	Details

=== City of London Corporation ===
The City of London Corporation held its elections on 20 March.

Council	Seats	Party control		Details
Council	Seats	Previous	Result	Details
City of London	100	Independent	Independent	Details

=== Isles of Scilly ===
Fifteen of the sixteen seats on the Isles of Scilly were returned uncontested at the close of nominations, with only the island of St Martin's holding a poll on 1 May.

Council	Seats	Party control		Details
Council	Seats	Previous	Result	Details
Isles of Scilly	16	Independent	Independent	Details

=== Elections delayed to 2026 ===
These elections were originally scheduled to be held in 2025, but on 5 February 2025 it was announced that they would be delayed by a year to 2026 to allow for reorganisation of local government structure. The relevant legislation had to pass the House of Lords, where some peers tried to prevent this happening. A fatal motion, tabled by Liberal Democrat peer Baroness Pinnock, which would have prevented the postponement, was defeated by 63 votes to 163.

Council	Seats	Party control
East Sussex	50	No overall control
Essex	78	Conservative
Hampshire	78	Conservative
Norfolk	84	Conservative
Surrey	81	Conservative
Suffolk	70	Conservative
West Sussex	70	Conservative
Isle of Wight	39	No overall control
Thurrock	49	Labour

== Maps ==
- Reform UK
- Liberal Democrats
- Labour Party
- Conservative Party
- Green Party
- Independent

=== County councils ===
Cambridgeshire

Derbyshire

Devon

Gloucestershire

Hertfordshire

Kent

Lancashire

Leicestershire

Lincolnshire

Nottinghamshire

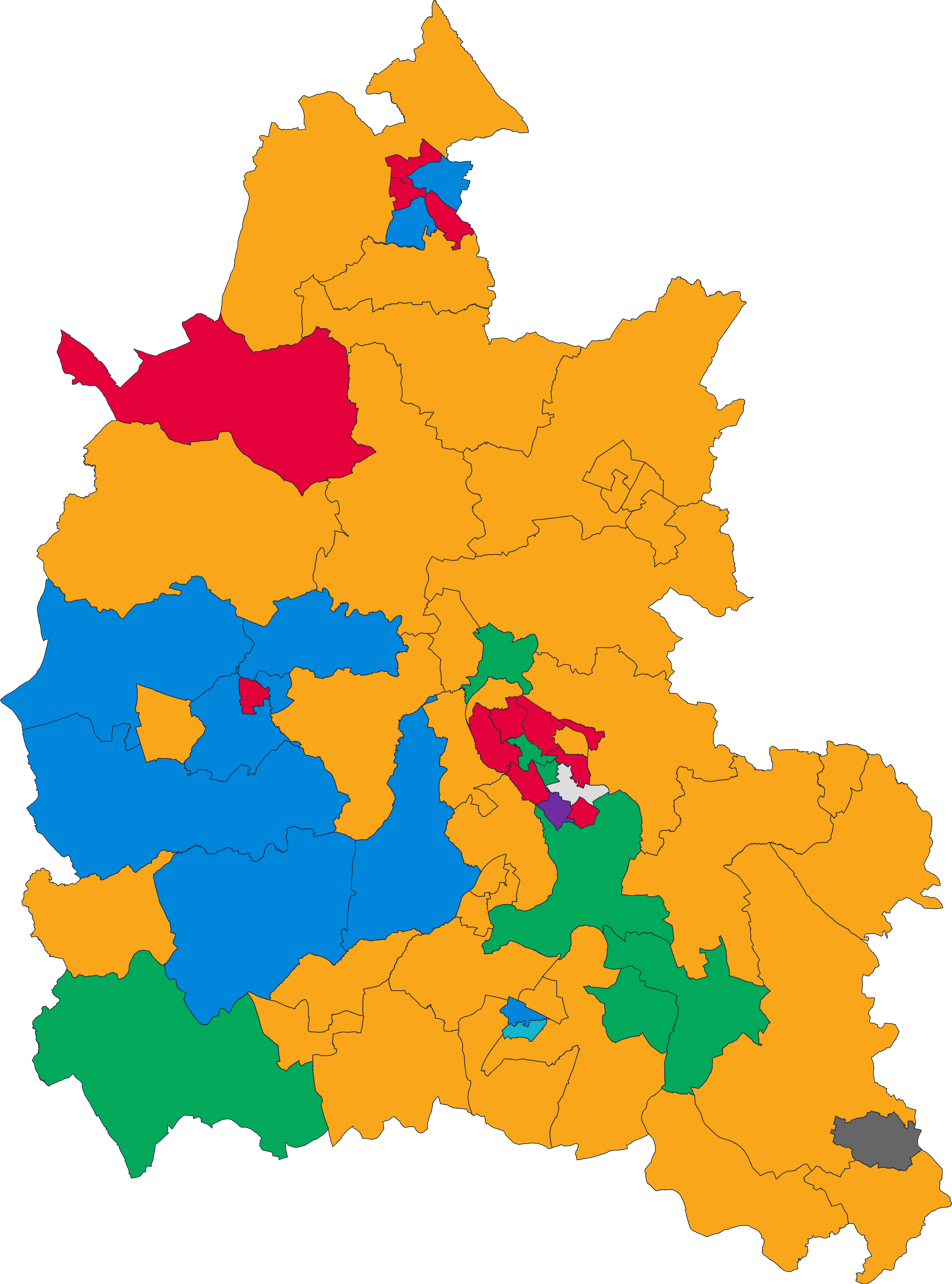
Oxfordshire

Staffordshire

Warwickshire

Worcestershire

=== Unitary authorities ===
Buckinghamshire

Cornwall

County Durham

North Northamptonshire

Northumberland

Shropshire

West Northamptonshire

Wiltshire

=== Metropolitan boroughs ===
Doncaster

== Analysis ==
The elections saw Reform UK win 804 seats and take control of 10 local authorities. The Green Party won 895 seats and control of 1 council. The governing Labour Party and opposition Conservative Party won 6,177 seats and 4,403 seats and overall control of 107 (-1) and 33 (-16) councils respectively. There were gains for the Liberal Democrats, who gained overall (majority) control in Cambridgeshire, Shropshire and Oxfordshire and won 3,197 seats and 40 councils overall. At 30%, Reform's projected national vote share was higher than UKIP's 23% at the 2013 local elections, representing the first set of local elections since PNS began to be calculated where neither the Conservative nor Labour parties received the highest vote share.

The result of the 2025 Runcorn and Helsby by-election, took place on the same day. Former shadow chancellor John McDonnell argued that recent government cuts had made voters feel that the party had turned its back on them. Richard Burgon, Labour MP for Leeds East, called the result "entirely avoidable". Starmer acknowledged that the result was disappointing but defended his government's decisions. Farage described the result as a "very big moment" for his party. He also attributed Labour's defeat to a loss of confidence in Starmer's governance, especially voter frustration on immigration.

Projected proportion of aggregate votes
Party	BBC			Sky News	
Party		Diff. from			Diff. from
Party		2024	2021		2024
Reform	30%	▲28pp	N/A (Note: Reform UK and the Green Party were counted as 'others' in former local election Projected National Shares.)	32%	N/A
Labour	20%	▼14pp	▼9pp	19%	▼16pp
Liberal Democrats	17%	Steady	Steady	16%	Steady
Conservative	15%	▼10pp	▼21pp	18%	▼8pp
Green	11%	▼2pp	N/A	7%	N/A
Others	7%	▼2pp	N/A	8%	N/A

== Opinion polls ==
=== Voting intention ===
Date(s) conducted	Pollster	Client	Sample size	Area	Con	Lab	LD	Grn	Ref	Others
17 – 24 Apr 2025	More In Common	Channel 4	977	GB	25%	18%	17%	8%	26%	6%

=== Seat projections ===
Date(s) conducted	Pollster	Client	Sample size	Area	Con	Lab	LD	Grn	Ref	Others
Results					319	98	370	79	677	94
1 – 10 Mar 2025	Electoral Calculus	The Daily Telegraph	5,421	GB	548	252	270	27	474	77
6 May 2021	2021 local elections		–	–	974	307	230	38	0	101

Lord Haywood, a Conservative peer and political pollster, predicted that the Conservative Party could lose between 475 and 525 councillors in the local elections. He also suggested that the results would not be particularly positive for the Labour Party, forecasting little change in its overall number of councillors. Haywood projected that Reform UK could gain between 400 and 450 seats. He further indicated that Labour could be at risk of losing control of Doncaster Council to Reform UK and might lose nearly all of its seats on either Oxfordshire or Cambridgeshire councils.

On the day of the election, prior to the close of polls, the New Statesman published a forecast from Britain Elects showing an expected result of the Conservatives on 483 seats, Labour on 334, the Liberal Democrats on 314, Reform on 311, Green on 56, and the remaining 109 for other parties.

== See also ==
- 2025 Runcorn and Helsby by-election (1 May)
- 2025 Manx local elections (24 April)
