= Emneth railway station =

Former railway station in Norfolk, England

Emneth
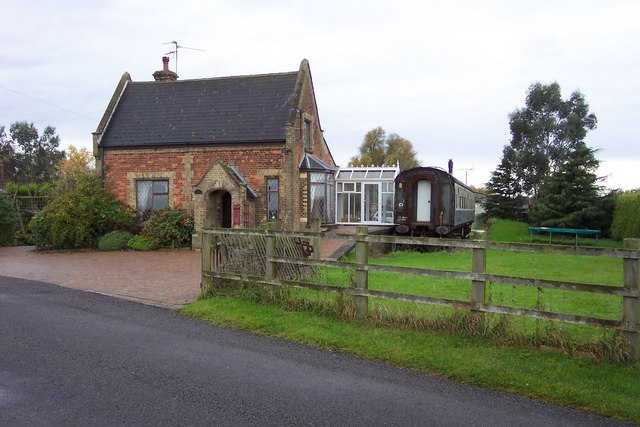
- Former station building in 2006.

General information
- Location: Emneth Hungate, King's Lynn and West Norfolk; England
- Coordinates: 52.6592°N 0.2166°E
- Grid reference: TF500091
- Platforms: 2

Other information
- Status: Disused

History
- Pre-grouping: East Anglian Railway; Great Eastern Railway
- Post-grouping: London and North Eastern Railway; Eastern Region of British Railways

Key dates
- 1 March 1848: Opened
- 9 September 1968: Closed
Location

Emneth was a railway station, near Wisbech, which served the village of Emneth, Norfolk. The station was opened in 1848 as an extension of the East Anglian Railway's line from Magdalen Road station (now known as Watlington) to Wisbech East. In 1872 Elizabeth Pearce, twelve year-old daughter of a nearby crossing keeper, drowned in the 'Tea-water pit'. The station's location, like that of the neighbouring Middle Drove station, was fairly rural and the line eventually closed in 1968. In October 1942, a hoard of Roman silver coins together with fragments of an urn in which they were stored was found near the station. Emneth's station building survived closure, and has since been converted into a private residence.

Preceding station	Disused railways	Following station
Walsoken	British Rail; Eastern Region; Wisbech Line	Smeeth Road
