= Smeeth Road railway station =

Former railway station in Norfolk, England

Smeeth Road
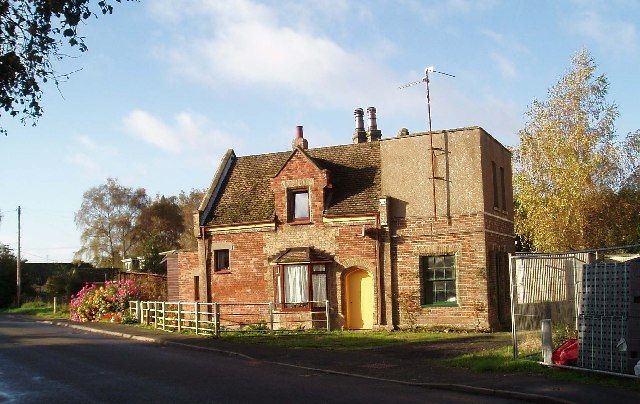
- Former station building in 2005.

General information
- Location: Marshland St James nr Wisbech, King's Lynn and West Norfolk; England
- Coordinates: 52.661041°N 0.24995°E
- Grid reference: TF521094
- Platforms: 1

Other information
- Status: Disused

History
- Pre-grouping: East Anglian Railway; Great Eastern Railway
- Post-grouping: London and North Eastern Railway; Eastern Region of British Railways

Key dates
- 1 March 1848: Opened
- 9 September 1968: Closed
Location

Smeeth Road was a railway station serving the villages of Emneth Hungate, Marshland St James and St John Fen's End, all east of Wisbech in Norfolk, England. The station was opened in 1848 as an extension of the East Anglian Railway's line from Magdalen Road station (now known as Watlington) to Wisbech East. The station's location, like that of the neighbouring Middle Drove station, was fairly rural and the line eventually closed in 1968, Smeeth Road's station building survived closure and has since been converted into a private residence.

The old signal box which sat adjacent to the station remained intact until it was dismantled in 2005 and replaced with a private home. The new signal box retains some original features and designs of the old one. The old platform to the station which is largely intact marks the boundary line between both the station and the signal box.

The old goods shed which sat behind the station was converted into 6 flats (St James Court). This also retains some of the original features including part of the original platform.

In the early 1960s the stationmaster was Ralph Pleasence, brother of the English actor Donald Pleasence.

Preceding station	Disused railways	Following station
Emneth	British Rail; Eastern Region; Wisbech Line	Middle Drove
