= March Elm Road railway station =

Proposed railway station in Cambridgeshire, England

Coordinates: 52.6048°N 0.1144°E

March Elm Road railway station is a proposed station in March, Cambridgeshire, which if successful, the Bramley Line will make as the southern terminus next to Elm Road Crossing. It was part of a branch of the Great Eastern Railway which ran from March to Watlington. The line closed to passengers in 1968, but a recent idea by the Wisbech and March Bramley Line to restore the line between Wisbech and March may see trains return to route in some form. However, the organisation would need to raise £10,000 to acquire the lease of the line and then set about repairing it to the required railways inspectorate standard. Additional funds to build this and other stations would then need to be raised by the small number of volunteers. No detailed costings for the additional work are available.

Elm Road has never had a station before, and this would be the southern terminus to begin with. It is the intention in years to come, to try to get Heritage services into the disused platforms at March Station. At present no business case has been made public to suggest that there is a demand for a heritage railway in this area, nor have any concrete proposals or costings been drawn up to substantiate this scheme.

Preceding station	Heritage railways	Following station
Proposed railways
March Terminus	Bramley Line	Coldham towards Wisbech
