= Emneth =

Village in Norfolk, England

Coordinates: 52.64257°N 0.20913°E

Emneth Primary
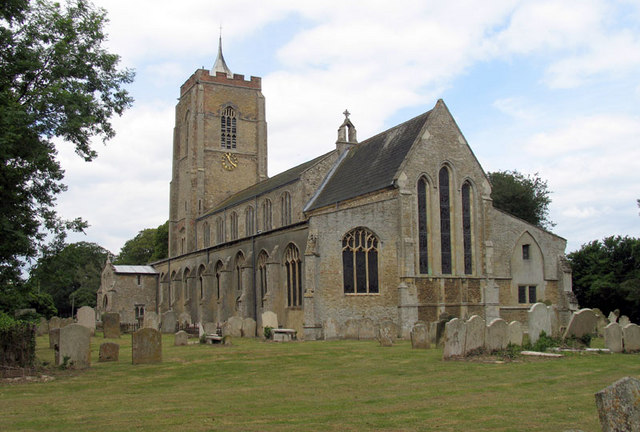
- St. Edmund's Church

- Location within Norfolk
- Area: 4.55 sq mi (11.8 km^{2})
- Population: 2,879 (2021 census)
  - Density: 633/sq mi (244/km^{2})
- OS grid reference: TF5103
  - London: 99.6 miles (160.3 km)
- Civil parish: Emneth
- District: King's Lynn and West Norfolk
- Shire county: Norfolk
- Region: East
- Country: England
- Sovereign state: United Kingdom
- Post town: WISBECH
- Postcode district: PE14
- Dialling code: 01945
- Police: Norfolk
- Fire: Norfolk
- Ambulance: East of England
- UK Parliament: South West Norfolk

Emneth is a village and civil parish in the English county of Norfolk.

Emneth is located 2.9 miles (4.7 km) south-east of Wisbech and 46 miles (74 km) west of Norwich, close to the course of the River Nene.

== History ==
Emneth's name is of Anglo-Saxon origin and derives from the Old English for Eana's meeting place or meadow.

Emneth is not featured in the Domesday Book of 1086, probably because in the late-Eleventh Century this area of Norfolk was still flooded.

Emneth was the site of Hagbeach Hall, a medieval manor house demolished in 1887.

Emneth Railway Station opened in 1848 as a stop on the Bramley Line between Watlington and Peterborough railway station. The station closed in 1968 as a result of the Beeching cuts, however, the railway infrastructure still remains as a private residence. Today, the nearest railway station is at Downham Market for the Fen Line between King's Lynn and Peterborough.

== Geography ==
According to the 2021 census, Emneth has a population of 2,879 people which shows an increase from the 2,617 people listed in the 2011 census. The parish of Emneth also includes the smaller hamlets of Emneth Hungate and Holly End.

Emneth is bisected by the A47, between Birmingham and Lowestoft, and is close to the course of the River Nene.

== St Edmund's Church ==
Emneth's parish church is dedicated to Saint Edmund and dates from the Fifteenth Century. St. Edmund's is located within the village on Church Road and has been Grade I listed since 1951.

St Edmund's has good examples of Eighteenth-Century stained glass installed by Clayton and Bell and William Wailes. One of the stained-glass roundels in the church depicts Thomas the Tank Engine, in commemoration of its creator, Rev. W. V. Awdry, who served as Vicar of Emneth from 1953 to 1965. St Edmund's also has a good example of a bell-cote with six bells, and Angels and the Apostles carved into the tie-beams and hammerbeams.

== Notable residents ==
- Reverend W. V. Awdry OBE – (1911–1997) clergyman and author of Thomas the Tank Engine, Vicar of Emneth.
- Tony Martin – (1944–2025) farmer, lived in Emneth.

== Governance ==
Emneth is part of the electoral ward of Emneth & Outwell for local elections and is part of the district of King's Lynn and West Norfolk

The village's national constituency is South West Norfolk which has been represented by Labour's Terry Jermy MP since 2024.

== War Memorial ==
Emneth War Memorial is a stone column topped with a small Celtic cross in St. Edmund's Churchyard, which was unveiled on 16 May 1920. The memorial lists the following names for the First World War:

Rank	Name	Unit	Date of death	Burial/Commemoration
Capt.	John A. Markham (Note: Capt. Markham was killed by a sniper's bullet near Armentieres, according to sources he was extremely popular with the men under his command who felt his loss keenly.)	1st Bn., East Yorkshire Regiment	7 May 1915	Strand Military Cemetery
2Lt.	Leonard W. Brooks	No. 2 Squadron RFC	6 Jul. 1917	Bully-Grenay Cemetery
Sgt.	Frederick Neal	1st Bn., Suffolk Regiment	18 Feb. 1915	Menin Gate
Sgt.	Frederick Day	2nd Bn., Suffolk Regt.	24 Sep. 1916	West Walton Cemetery
A/Sgt.	John H. Claxton	1st Bn., Norfolk Regiment	14 Mar. 1915	Menin Gate
Cpl.	Robert Lines	Royal Field Artillery	10 Apr. 1916	Beauval Cemetery
LCpl.	Archibald B. Crofts	2nd Bn., King's Royal Rifle Corps	30 Nov. 1916	All Saints' Churchyard
LCpl.	Ernest A. Edwards	2/4th Bn., Lincolnshire Regiment	8 Jun. 1917	Thiepval Memorial
LCpl.	Reginald V. Green (Note: LCpl. Green was sent home wounded in March 1918 and subsequently succumbed to his wounds.)	1st Bn., Middlesex Regiment	19 Jun. 1918	St. Edmund's Churchyard
Dvr.	John Chase	72nd Bde., Royal Field Artillery	27 Sep. 1918	Mœuvres Cemetery
Pte.	George Laws	1st Bn., Bedfordshire Regiment	22 Aug. 1918	Gommecourt Cemetery
Pte.	Len Brown (Note: Pte. Brown was drowned whilst bathing in a pond.)	1st Bn., Cambridgeshire Regiment	22 Aug. 1917	Locre Hospice Cemetery
Pte.	Oliver Hunter	1st Bn., Cambridgeshire Regt.	22 Mar. 1918	Pozières Memorial
Pte.	Arthur Roper	1st Bn., Cambridgeshire Regt.	2 Jun. 1915	Erquinghem-Lys Cemetery
Pte.	Ernest Killingsworth	4/1st Bn., Cambridgeshire Regt.	2 May 1919	St. Edmund's Churchyard
Pte.	George W. Hurst	8th Bn., East Surrey Regiment	26 Feb. 1919	St. Edmund's Churchyard
Pte.	Harry Glover	4th Bn., Grenadier Guards	25 Sep. 1916	Thiepval Memorial
Pte.	Stanley H. C. Lines	2nd Bn., Hampshire Regiment	28 Apr. 1917	Étaples Military Cemetery
Pte.	Thomas Sharp	Labour Corps	24 Nov. 1918	St. Edmund's Churchyard
Pte.	Samuel F. Balderson	7th Bn., Lincolnshire Regiment	3 Jul. 1916	Thiepval Memorial
Pte.	Frank Moyses	3rd Bn., Machine Gun Corps	31 Aug. 1918	Mory Abbey Cemetery
Pte.	Samuel Stokes	25th Bn., M.G.C.	29 Aug. 1917	Wimereux Cemetery
Pte.	Charles W. Brewington	16th Bn., Middlesex Regiment	17 Apr. 1917	Arras Memorial
Pte.	William Hanslip	9th Bn., Norfolk Regiment	18 Oct. 1916	Thiepval Memorial
Pte.	Arthur Hurst	5th Bn., Northamptonshire Regt.	19 Sep. 1918	Vis-en-Artois Memorial
Pte.	William B. Smith MM (Note: Pte. Smith was an adjutant to an officer and was killed by artillery-fire whilst accompanying said officer around frontline trenches.)	2nd Bn., Suffolk Regiment	19 Jul. 1916	Montauban Cemetery
Pte.	William Jackson	5th Bn., Suffolk Regt.	2 Nov. 1917	Menin Gate

The following additions were made following the Second World War:

Rank	Name	Unit	Date of death	Burial/Commemoration
Capt.	Harold M. R. Norton	Glider Pilot Regiment	24 Mar. 1945	Reichswald Forest Cemetery
FO	Arthur R. Ludlow	No. 44 Squadron RAF	18 Jul. 1943	Runnymede Memorial
Sgt.	Neville W. Carlile	No. 82 Squadron RAF	13 Jun. 1940	Harlingen General Cemetery
LCpl.	Walter H. White	Corps of Military Police	5 Apr. 1944	All Saints' Churchyard
Acw.	Vera M. Matthews	Women's Auxiliary Air Force	28 Dec. 1944	St. Edmund's Churchyard
Dvr.	Joseph L. Mason	Royal Army Medical Corps	1 Sep. 1944	Cassino Memorial
Dvr.	Frank Farrow	Royal Army Service Corps	28 Sep. 1944	Gradara War Cemetery
Gnr.	Robert Bruce	55 Anti-Tank Regt., Royal Artillery	17 Jul. 1944	Saint-Manvieu War Cemetery
Pte.	Charles H. Baxter	2nd Bn., Cambridgeshire Regiment	24 Jan. 1942	Kranji War Memorial
Pte.	Leslie Wabe	7th Bn., Cheshire Regiment	18 Jan. 1944	Minturno War Cemetery
Pte.	Richard R. Neal	6th Bn., Royal Norfolk Regiment	29 Sep. 1943	Kanchanaburi War Cemetery
Pte.	Percy I. White	2nd Bn., Suffolk Regiment	19 Jan. 1944	Chittagong War Cemetery

== Gallery ==
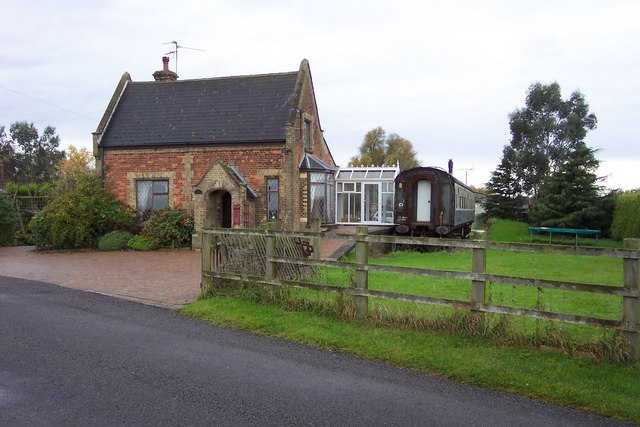
The old station house, now a private house

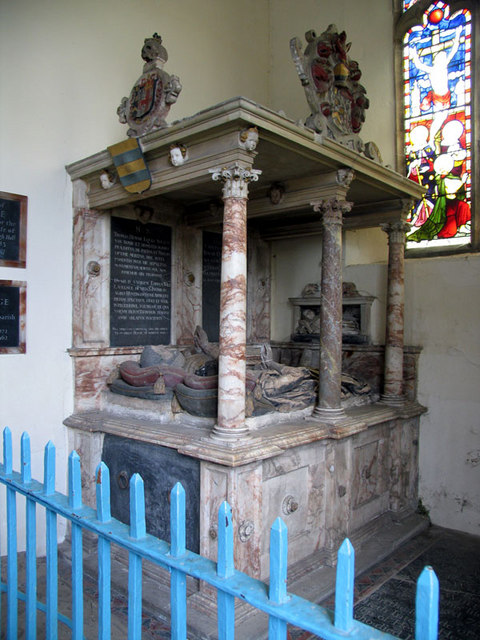
Tomb Chest of Sir Thomas Hewar, by Nicholas Stone
