= Coldham railway station =

Former railway station in Cambridgeshire, England

Coordinates: 52.6048°N 0.1144°E

Coldham

General information
- Location: Fenland; England
- Platforms: 2

Other information
- Status: Disused

History
- Original company: Eastern Counties Railway
- Pre-grouping: Great Eastern Railway
- Post-grouping: London and North Eastern Railway; Eastern Region of British Railways

Key dates
- 1847: Opened
- 7 March 1966: Closed
Location

Coldham railway station was a station in Coldham, Cambridgeshire. It was on the branch of the Great Eastern Railway which ran from March to Watlington, Norfolk. The station opened in 1847, and in 1894 a porter was killed in an accident there.

The station closed in 1966, the line closed for passengers in 1968 and for freight in 2000. Nothing remains of the former station, with the exception of the former toilet block, which is concealed by undergrowth which has built up since the station closed.

A plan by the Bramley Line to restore the line between Wisbech and March may see trains return to Coldham in some form.

Disused railways
March	British Rail; Eastern Region; Wisbech Line	Wisbech East
Preceding station	Heritage railways	Following station
Proposed railways
March Elm Road towards March	Bramley Line	Waldersea towards Wisbech
