= Wisbech North railway station =

Former railway station in Cambridgeshire, England

Coordinates: 52.6694°N 0.1499°E

Wisbech North
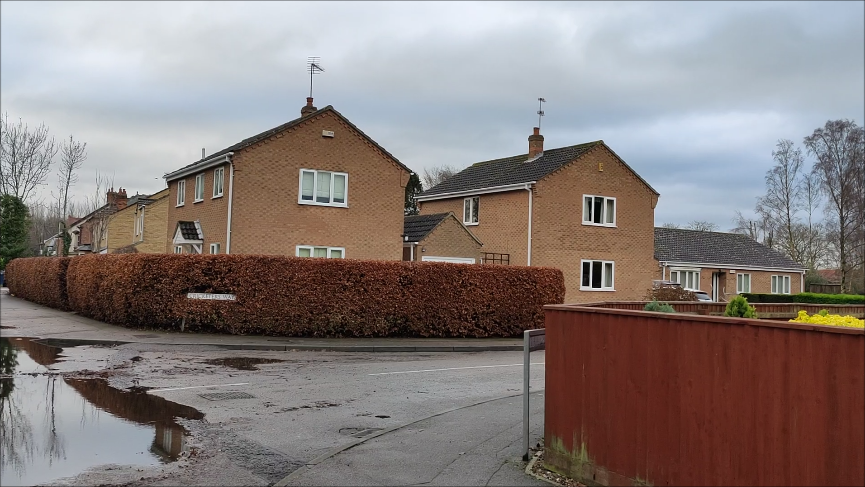
- Site of Wisbech North station in 2022

General information
- Location: Wisbech, Cambridgeshire; England
- Platforms: 2

Other information
- Status: Disused

History
- Original company: Peterborough, Wisbeach and Sutton Railway
- Pre-grouping: Midland and Great Northern Joint Railway
- Post-grouping: Midland and Great Northern Joint Railway

Key dates
- 1 Aug 1866: Opened as Wisbeach
- 4 May 1877: Renamed; Wisbech
- 27 Sep 1948: Renamed; Wisbech North
- 2 Mar 1959: Closed for passengers
- 28 December 1964: closed for freight
Location

Wisbech North railway station was a station serving the town of Wisbech, Cambridgeshire. It was part of the Midland and Great Northern Joint Railway and was one of two stations serving the town. The other was Wisbech East on the line from March to Watlington also known as the Bramley Line. Wisbech North station was located just off Harecroft Road near a small housing estate called "Cricketers Way".

Preceding station	Disused railways	Following station
Wisbech St Mary	Midland and Great Northern; Peterborough Line	Ferry

== History ==
Located on Harecroft Road, it was on the line between Sutton Bridge and Peterborough which was closed in 1959 by British Railways.

== See also ==
Wisbech East railway station
