= Middle Drove railway station =

Former railway station in Norfolk, England

Middle Drove
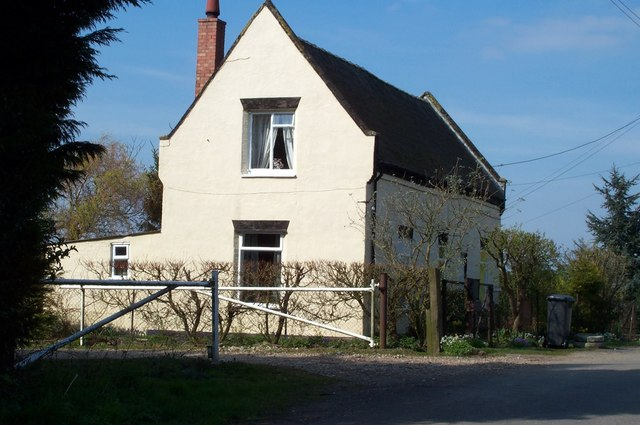
- Former station building in 2001.

General information
- Location: Marshland St James, King's Lynn and West Norfolk; England
- Coordinates: 52.6638°N 0.2885°E
- Grid reference: TF547098
- Platforms: 2

Other information
- Status: Disused

History
- Original company: East Anglian Railways
- Pre-grouping: Great Eastern Railway
- Post-grouping: London and North Eastern Railway; Eastern Region of British Railways

Key dates
- 1 March 1848: Opened
- 9 September 1968: Closed
Location

Middle Drove was a railway station which served the nearby village of Tilney Fen End (situated 1 mile (1.6 km) to the north northeast) near Downham Market in Norfolk, England. The station was opened in 1848 as an extension of the East Anglian Railways' line from Magdalen Road station (now known as Watlington) to Wisbech East. The station's location, like that of the neighbouring Smeeth Road station, was fairly rural and the line eventually closed in 1968. Middle Drove's station building survived closure and has since been converted into a private residence.

In October 2022, demolition work was carried out to remove the platform, waiting room and station canopy. The station house remains, but an application for planning permission has been submitted for its demolition and replacement.

In May 2024, the station house was demolished and a new property is now being built on the site.

Preceding station	Disused railways	Following station
Smeeth Road	British Rail; Eastern Region; Wisbech Line	Magdalen Gate
