= Emneth Hungate =

Coordinates: 52.645258°N 0.239951°E

- Location within Norfolk
- District: Kings Lynn and West Norfolk
- Shire county: Norfolk
- Region: East
- Country: England
- Sovereign state: United Kingdom
- Post town: WISBECH
- Postcode district: PE14
- Dialling code: 01945
- UK Parliament: South West Norfolk

Emneth Hungate is a small settlement near the village of Emneth in Norfolk, England, near the border with Cambridgeshire. It once had its own railway station on the now-closed line between Watlington and Wisbech.

== Notable residents ==
- Tony Martin (1944–2025), farmer convicted of murder after killing a burglar at his farm in 1999.
