= Walsoken railway station =

Former railway station in Norfolk, England

Walsoken

General information
- Location: Walsoken, Norfolk; England
- Coordinates: 52.6577°N 0.1754°E
- Grid reference: TF472088

Other information
- Status: Disused

History
- Original company: Eastern Counties Railway

Key dates
- 1 Mar 1848: Opened
- Aug 1851: Closed
Location

Walsoken railway station was located on the line between Wisbech East and Emneth. It served the village and parish of Walsoken in Norfolk, England, and closed in 1851. Today there is no trace of the station or the railway as the site has been redeveloped with housing.

Preceding station	Disused railways	Following station
Wisbech East	Eastern Counties Railway; Wisbech branch	Emneth
