= Whittlesea railway station =

Railway station in Cambridgeshire, England

Whittlesea
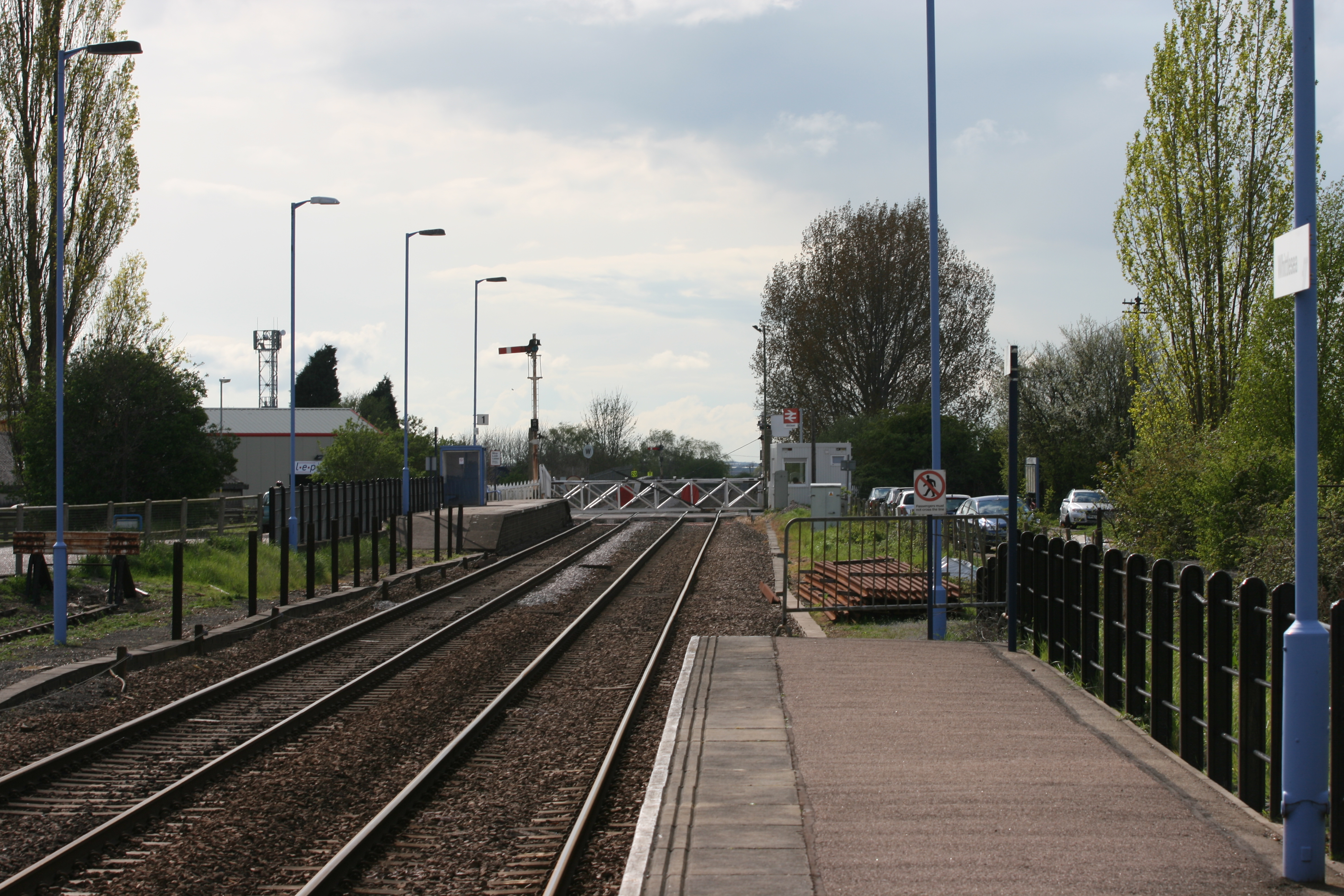
- Looking west from platform 2 towards platform 1 and the level crossing

General information
- Location: Whittlesey, Fenland; England
- Coordinates: 52.5493°N 0.1184°W
- Grid reference: TL277963
- Manager: Greater Anglia
- Platforms: 2

Other information
- Station code: WLE
- Classification: DfT category F2

Passengers
- 2021/22: ▲26,436
- 2022/23: ▲33,738
- 2023/24: ▲43,364
- 2024/25: ▲51,194
- 2025/26: ▲59,150
Location
Notes
- Passenger statistics from the Office of Rail and Road

Whittlesea Railway Station is situated in the market town of Whittlesey, in Cambridgeshire, and is located on the Hereward Line, which runs between Ely and Peterborough. It was opened on 2 June 1845 by the Eastern Counties Railway as a part of a project to connect Ely and Peterborough by rail. Its name preserves the historic spelling of the town. Whittlesea Station originally consisted of two station buildings, one being on each platform, alongside a manually operated level crossing, although both of the buildings were later demolished.

It is located in between March and Peterborough stations, 94 miles 60 chains (152.5 km) away from London Liverpool Street via Ely.

== History ==
All of the original station buildings have long since been demolished, and only the two staggered platforms remain. Unlike most level crossings, the gates at Whittlesea station are still opened and closed manually by a member of railway staff, who is based in the adjacent Crossing Keeper's Hut. Two ticket machines can be found at Whittlesea Station, one of them being located on Platform 1, and the other being located next to the path on the way to Platform 2, near the Crossing Keeper's Hut

On 14 September 1968, Flying Scotsman stopped at the station twice to have its tenders refilled with water. The locomotive was chartering The Chesterfield Flyer from Ipswich to Chesterfield, via Norwich.

Volunteer Station Adopters come and maintain the station in their spare time, as Whittlesea has no employed members of staff.

== Station Updates ==
Updates to the station were announced on the 20th of May 2025 as a part of the plan drawn up by the local council and Hereward Community Rail Partnership. In early 2026, after several surveys were conducted by commuters and locals, it was announced that Whittlesea Station would be updated with longer platforms, an improved car park, and a pedestrian footbridge.

== Services ==
Greater Anglia provides the primary service at Whittlesea. There is one train every two hours each way, including Sundays, between Peterborough and Ipswich; there are occasional extensions to Colchester.

CrossCountry operates three trains per day Monday-Saturday between Birmingham and Cambridge, of which two are extended beyond Cambridge to Stansted Airport.

East Midlands Railway runs a single morning service to Liverpool Lime Street Monday-Saturday only.

Preceding station	National Rail	Following station
March	Abellio Greater Anglia Ipswich–Peterborough	Peterborough
March	CrossCountry Birmingham–Stansted Airport Limited service	Peterborough
March	East Midlands Railway Liverpool–Norwich Limited service	Peterborough
Historical railways
Eastrea Line open, station closed	Great Eastern Railway Ely–Peterborough line	Peterborough East Line open, station closed
