= Magdalen Gate railway station =

Former railway station in Norfolk, England

Coordinates: 52.6683°N 0.3525°E

Magdalen Gate

General information
- Location: Wiggenhall St Mary Magdalen, King's Lynn and West Norfolk; England

Other information
- Status: Disused

History
- Original company: East Anglian Railways
- Pre-grouping: Great Eastern Railway

Key dates
- 1 Mar 1848: Opened
- 1 Aug 1866: Closed
Location

Magdalen Gate railway station was located on the line between Middle Drove and Watlington. It served the parish of Wiggenhall St Mary Magdalen, and closed in 1866. Nothing remains of the station.

Preceding station	Disused railways	Following station
Middle Drove	British Rail; Eastern Region; Wisbech Line	Watlington
