= Eastrea railway station =

Former railway station in Cambridgeshire, England

Coordinates: 52.5509°N 0.0849°W

Eastrea

General information
- Location: Eastrea, Fenland; England
- Grid reference: TL298965
- Platforms: 2

Other information
- Status: Disused

History
- Pre-grouping: Great Eastern Railway

Key dates
- 2 June 1845: Opened
- 1866: Closed
Location

Eastrea railway station was a station serving the village of Eastrea, Cambridgeshire on the Great Eastern Railway's line from Ely to Peterborough. The station was situated at the level crossing on the road leading south from the village towards Benwick. 2 miles (3.2 km) east of the station was Three Horseshoes junction from where the Benwick goods railway headed south to Benwick.

== Summary of services ==
| Preceding station | Historical railways | Following station |
|---|---|---|
| Whittlesea | Great Eastern Railway; Peterborough to Ely | March |

== Sample train timetable for February 1863 ==
The table below shows the train departures from Eastrea on weekdays in February 1863. There was no Sunday service. Eastrea was a request stop. Passengers wishing to alight had to inform the guard at the previous station and those wishing to join had to signal to the driver as the train approached.

| Departure | Going to | Calling at | Arrival | Operator |
|---|---|---|---|---|
| 07.22 | Ely | March, Stonea, Manea, Black Bank, Chittisham, Ely | 08.25 | GER |
| 09.55; Sat only | Peterborough East | Whittlesea, Peterborough East | 10.15 | GER |
| 11.57 | Peterborough East | Whittlesea, Peterborough East | 12.20 | GER |
| 15.15 | Cambridge | March, Stonea, Manea, Black Bank, Ely, Waterbeach, Cambridge | 16.45 | GER |
| 17.00 | Ely | March, Stonea, Manea, Black Bank, Chittisham, Ely | 17.58 | GER |
| 19.20 | Peterborough East | Whittlesea, Peterborough East | 19.40 | GER |
