= Eastrea =

Village in Cambridgeshire, England

Coordinates: 52.556°N 0.089°W

- Location within Cambridgeshire
- OS grid reference: TL 29492 97237
- Civil parish: Whittlesey
- District: Fenland
- Shire county: Cambridgeshire
- Region: East
- Country: England
- Sovereign state: United Kingdom
- Post town: PETERBOROUGH
- Postcode district: PE7
- Dialling code: 01733
- Police: Cambridgeshire
- Fire: Cambridgeshire
- Ambulance: East of England

Eastrea is a village in Cambridgeshire, located on the A605 between Whittlesey and Coates. The site has been inhabited since Roman times. The population is included in the civil parish of Whittlesey.

== History ==
There was once a church in the village, lost in the 18th century, as well as a chapel which still stands today, albeit converted for commercial use. The first official wedding there took place on 27 September 1927. The village also had a railway station (Eastrea railway station) from 1845 until 1866, as well as a shop which closed in the 1980s.

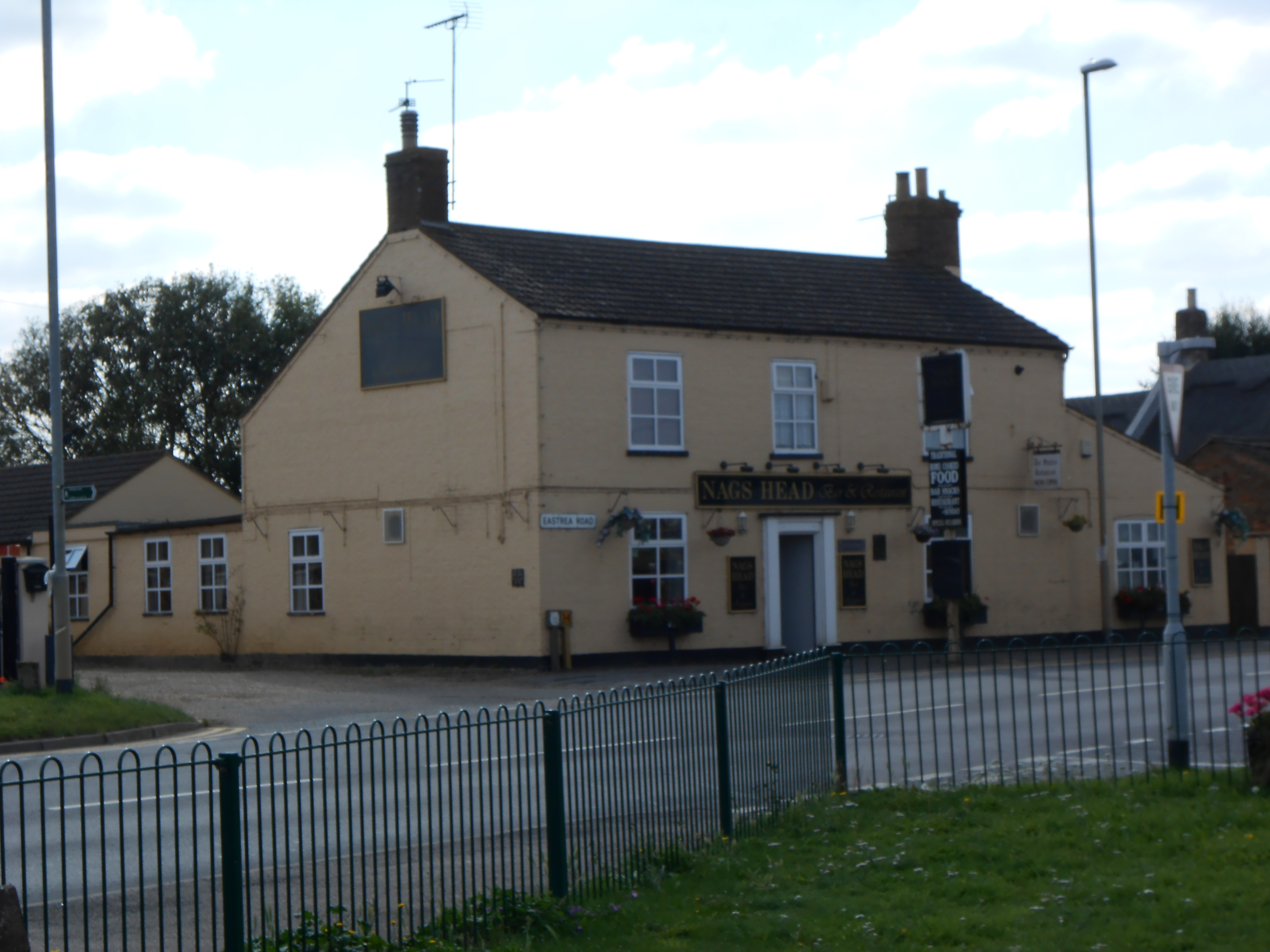
The Nag's Head viewed from the Green in 2014

Eastrea was formerly the home of two public houses, The Windmill and The Nags Head. The Windmill was demolished in the mid 20th century and it was hoped that the site would be used for a new village hall; such plans never came to fruition. In 2010 the owners of The Nag's Head sought planning approval to convert the pub into houses, citing a significant downturn in business as the main reason for doing so. However, Fenland District Council refused permission, stating that 'financial loss is no reason to allow the conversion of a pub', which was described as 'the beating heart of the community' by locals and regulars. Now to Nags Head has been converted into a new local convenience shop.

== Village Hall ==
Since the 1940s, residents have been fighting for permission to build a village hall. A number of possible locations have been suggested over the years, and permission was granted in the 1960s for a hall on the former site of The Windmill pub, but no work was completed before the permission expired. In the 1990s an area of land off Thornham Way was offered, but once again no work was done quickly enough, and the land is now public open space. The present site was provided by Fenland District Council in 2004, on the basis that 14 new homes also would be constructed alongside the village hall. Planning permission was given in 2009. Work began in 2010 but was halted when an archeological dig revealed a human skeleton, believed to be around 2000 years old.

Surveying work and the test digging was completed in 2011, and construction work began in earnest the following summer. In September 2012 work began on the framework of the building, and it was due to be completed in May 2013. The total budget cost was over £800,000. In July 2013, Prince Richard, Duke of Gloucester opened the new hall, called the Eastrea Centre, in Coates Road.

== See also ==
- List of places in Cambridgeshire
