= Beauval Communal Cemetery =

Cemetery located in the Somme region of France

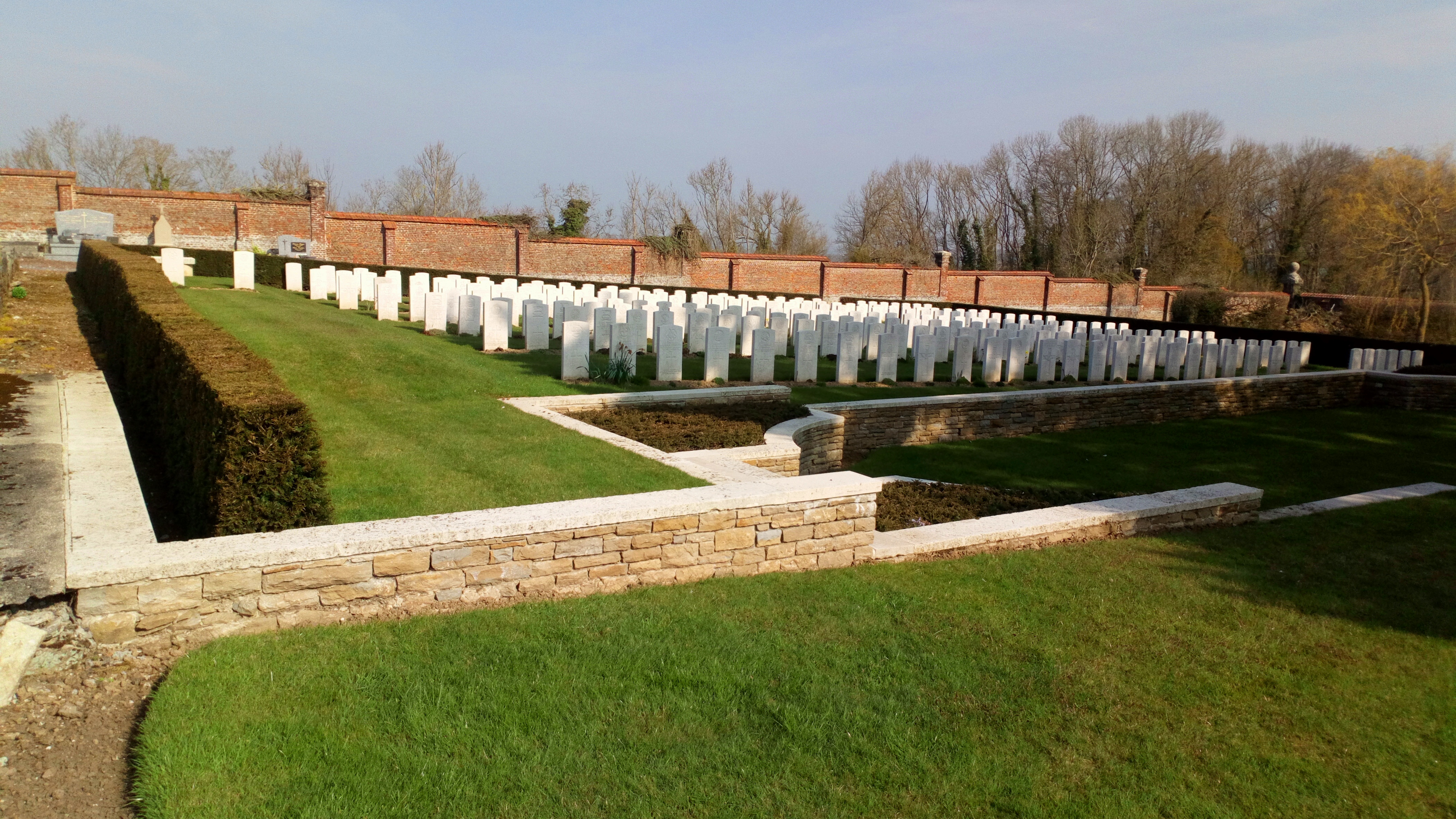

Details
- Established: 1915
- Location: Beauval, Somme, France
- Country: British and Commonwealth
- Coordinates: 50.11155°N 2.32927°E
- Type: Military
- No. of graves: 250 total, 249 identified
- Website: cwgc.org
- Find a Grave: Beauval Communal Cemetery

The Beauval Communal Cemetery is a cemetery located in the Somme region of France commemorating British and Commonwealth soldiers who fought in the Battle of the Somme in World War I. The cemetery contains casualties processed through the Allied 4th and 47th Casualty Clearing Stations in the village of Beauval in the First World War and a small number of casualties from the Second World War.

== Location ==
The cemetery is located on the by-road Rue de l'Eglise, which is located in the northern end of Beauval approximately 24 kilometers north of the town of Amiens and 6 kilometers south of the town of Doullens.

== Establishment of the Cemetery ==
=== History ===
The 4th Casualty Clearing Station began and used the cemetery from June 1915 to October 1916 while stationed at Beauval. From October to December 1916, the cemetery was used by the 47th Casualty Clearing Station. A small number of burials were created in the cemetery as late as March 1918. After the end of World War I, graves from Lucheux Military Cemetery were moved to rows A through G of Beauval Communal Cemetery. A Cross of Sacrifice is located in front of the main cemetery gate. The cemetery was designed by G. H. Goldsmith.

=== Statistics ===
There are of total of 248 World War I burials in the cemetery, all of which are identified. There is also 1 burial from World War II in the cemetery, and one undescribed burial from an unknown source, for a total of 250 burials.

Identified Burials by Nationality
War	Nationality	Number of Burials
World War I	United Kingdom	235
World War I	Australia	8
World War I	Canada	5
World War I	New Zealand	1
World War II	Canada	1
