= March railway station =

Railway station in Cambridgeshire, England

March
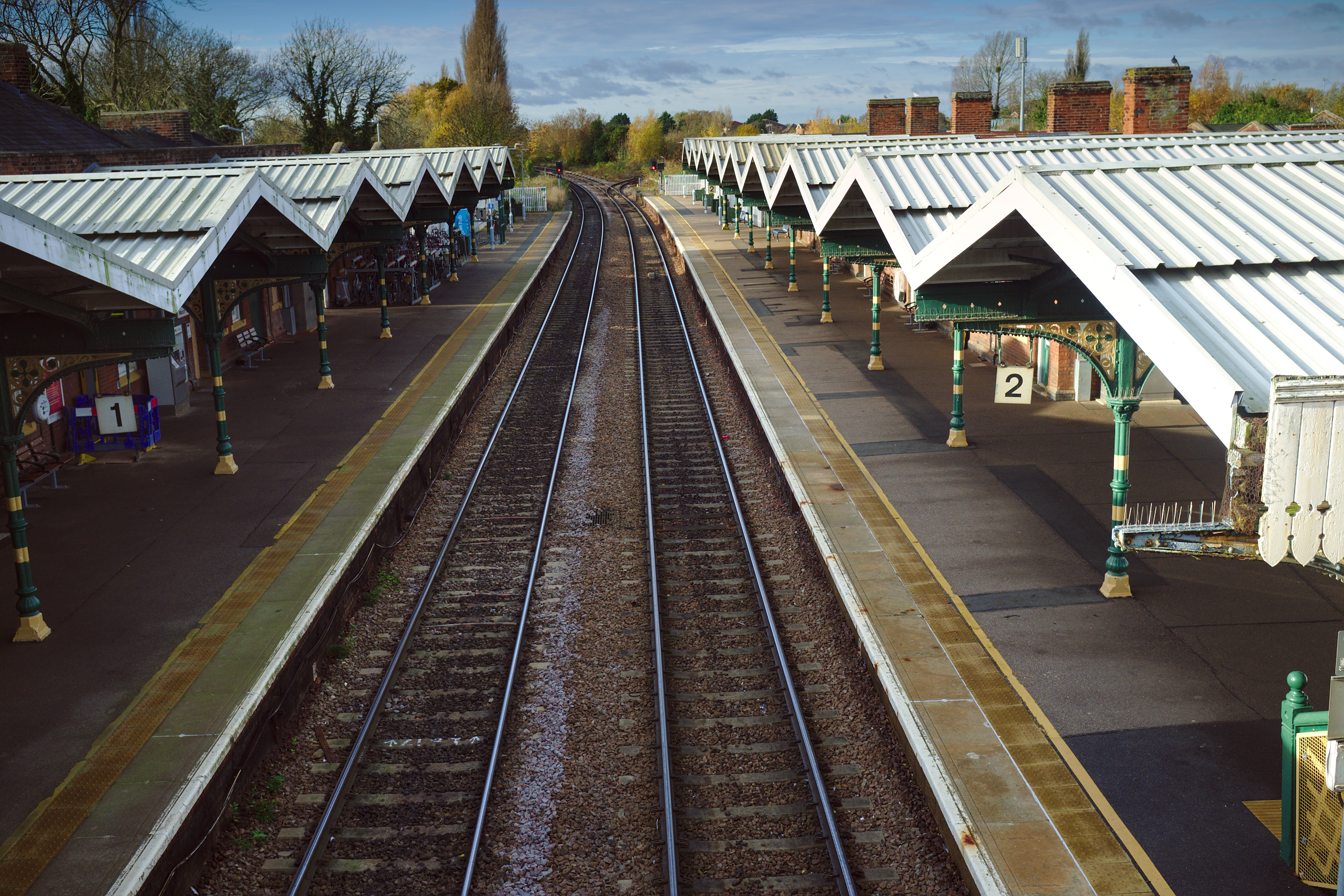

General information
- Location: March, Fenland; England
- Coordinates: 52.5605°N 0.0905°E
- Grid reference: TL418978
- Manager: Greater Anglia
- Platforms: 2

Other information
- Station code: MCH
- Classification: DfT category E

Passengers
- 2021/22: ▲0.252 million
- 2022/23: ▲0.305 million
- 2023/24: ▲0.341 million
- 2024/25: ▲0.374 million
- 2025/26: ▼0.371 million
Location
Notes
- Passenger statistics from the Office of Rail and Road

March railway station is a railway station on the Ely–Peterborough line in the east of England and serves the market town of March, Cambridgeshire, England. It is 85 miles 76 chains (138.3 km) measured from London Liverpool Street via Ely and is situated between Manea and Whittlesea stations.

== History ==
The station frontage, seen in June 2010

The station, which was opened in 1847, was once a major junction with a number of lines radiating from the town.

The station has been the scene of a number of accidents including a double train crash in 1896.

The station has since reduced in importance, with several lines being dismantled or mothballed. The regional route between Ely and Peterborough still runs through the station and an increasing number of freight trains pass through.

The station originally had seven platforms; however, two of these are now filled-in bay platforms and the track has been removed from a further west-facing bay on the southern side of the station. There are now just two operational platforms, although track has been re-laid on two disused platforms on the northern side of the station and it is anticipated that these may be used should proposals to re-open the line to Wisbech come to fruition. The nearby Whitemoor marshalling yard returned to use in 2004, having been disused since the early 1990s.

In 2021, a Victorian ledger dating back to April 1885 was found after it fell from the loft of the station when contractors were removing rotten wood work. The ledger is planned to go on display at the station.

In March 2022, the station car park was resurfaced and repainted.

=== Spalding, St Ives and Wisbech branches ===
March was once a junction for lines to Spalding (opened in 1867 by the Great Northern Railway and subsequently vested jointly with the Great Eastern Railway in 1879), St Ives (opened in 1848) and Watlington via Wisbech. The Spalding line was closed by British Rail in November 1982 and was completely lifted a few years later. The St Ives branch was closed completely in March 1967 as a result of the Beeching cuts, whilst the Wisbech line (known as the Bramley Line) closed to all traffic in 2000 having lost its regular passenger services (through to Kings Lynn) in September 1968. The trackwork however remains intact and there are proposals to reopen the line as a heritage line run and maintained by enthusiasts.

== Services ==
CrossCountry operates an hourly service eastbound to Cambridge and Stansted Airport. Westbound services travel towards Peterborough, Leicester and Birmingham New Street.

Greater Anglia operates one train every two hours in each direction between Ipswich and Peterborough.

An hourly East Midlands Railway service between Norwich and Liverpool Lime Street normally runs through without stopping, though a few morning and evening peak trains do call.

Preceding station	National Rail	Following station
Whittlesea	Greater Anglia Ipswich–Peterborough	Manea
Peterborough	CrossCountry Birmingham–Stansted Airport	Ely
Whittlesea (Limited service)	CrossCountry Birmingham–Stansted Airport	Manea (Limited service)
Peterborough	East Midlands Railway Liverpool–Norwich (Limited service)	Ely
Whittlesea (Limited service)	East Midlands Railway Liverpool–Norwich (Limited service)	Ely
Preceding station	Heritage railways	Following station
Proposed railways
Terminus	Bramley Line	March Elm Road towards Wisbech
Historical railways
Eastrea; Line open, station closed	Great Eastern Railway; Peterborough to Ely	Stonea; Line open, station closed
Disused railways
Terminus	British Rail; Eastern Region; Wisbech Line	Coldham; Line and station closed
Guyhirne; Line and station closed	Great Northern and Great Eastern Joint Railway; Doncaster to March	Terminus
Terminus	Great Northern and Great Eastern Joint Railway; March to St Ives	Wimblington; Line and station closed
