= Wisbech East railway station =

Former railway station in Cambridgeshire, England

Wisbech East
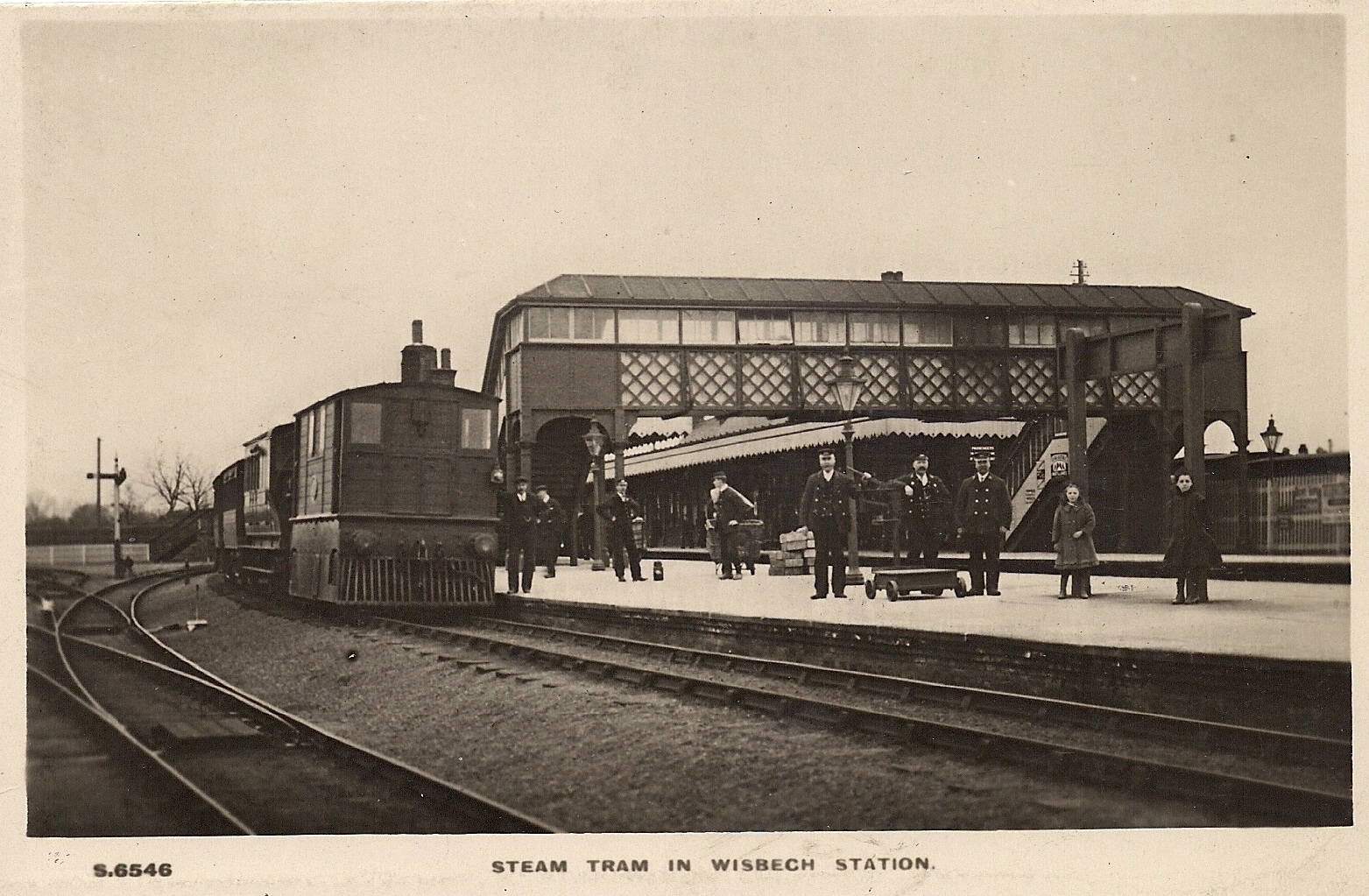

General information
- Location: Wisbech, Fenland; England
- Coordinates: 52.6585°N 0.1590°E
- Grid reference: TF462088
- Platforms: 3

Other information
- Status: Disused

History
- Original company: Eastern Counties Railway
- Pre-grouping: Great Eastern Railway
- Post-grouping: London and North Eastern Railway; Eastern Region of British Railways

Key dates
- 1 March 1848: Opened as Wisbeach
- 4 May 1877: Renamed Wisbech
- 27 September 1948: Renamed Wisbech East
- 9 September 1968: Closed
Location

Wisbech East was a railway station in Wisbech, Cambridgeshire. It was opened in 1848 and became part of the Great Eastern Railway network, providing connections to March, Watlington and St Ives, as well as Upwell via the Wisbech and Upwell Tramway. The station closed in 1968 and no trace of it remains today. A freight-only line remains extant as far as a factory based in the station's former goods yard, and a heritage railway based in March is aiming to reinstate services to Wisbech and construct a new station as near as possible to Newbridge Lane crossing.

In June 2009 the Association of Train Operating Companies published a report indicating that the reopening of the line to Wisbech and construction of a new station could be viable, in that the ratio of business, economic and social benefits to costs would be just over £1m.

== History ==
=== Opening ===
It was the Eastern Counties Railway which first reached Wisbech from the south in May 1847 with the opening of a line from St Ives via March; a temporary wooden station named Wisbeach was built on the site of the future Wisbech goods yard (at grid reference TF458093). The East Anglian Railways made its way from the east to Wisbech the following year with a line from Magdalen Road station; their station - on the site of the future Wisbech East station - was also a temporary structure named Wisbeach. A short curve joined the two lines.

The two stations remained in use until at least 1851 when a lease was agreed between the two companies giving the operation of the East Anglian Railways to the Eastern Counties, the agreement taking effect at the beginning of 1852. In 1862, the Great Eastern Railway (GER) acquired the line and subsequently closed the Eastern Counties' Wisbeach station to passenger traffic the following year. A line from the station to the harbour was laid in 1863.

=== Wisbech and Upwell Tramway ===
It is not thought that the East Anglian Railways provided any accommodation at their primitive wooden station, but this was to change in August 1883 with the opening of the first section of the Wisbech and Upwell Tramway. New sidings and a brick engine shed were constructed for the trams that were to work the new route from Wisbeach station (renamed Wisbech in 1877), leaving the wooden passenger station to look decidedly out-of-place. After pressure from Wisbech Borough Council for new facilities, the railway company finally issued a call for tenders in 1887 and accepted the offer of Harold Arnold & Son of Doncaster to build a station for £4,367.

A new brick engine shed was also provided, with a 42 ft turntable, on a goods spur; initially it had only a single road to accommodate a trio of engines, but a second was added in 1893 to handle the station's growing traffic in perishables. This went out of use in the 1910s, with only the turntable remaining by 1925 when the London and North Eastern Railway had taken over responsibility for the line. Activities at Wisbech was by that time principally concerned with the tramway. Tramway services departed from a specially-low platform at Wisbech.

=== Decline and closure ===
The ABC Railway Guide for April 1956 shows a service of six trains a day from London Liverpool Street between Monday and Friday, with an extra train on Wednesdays; seven trains called on Saturdays and three on Sundays. The journey time was around 4 hours and the fare was £1–9s–6d return for 3rd class travel.

The tramway to Upwell was closed in 1966 (passenger services had been withdrawn in 1927), with the line from March to Magdalen Road via Wisbech following in September 1968. The section east of Wisbech was subsequently dismantled, but the rest of the route remained open for freight traffic (from March Whitemoor Junction) to Wisbech East goods yard.in order to serve the Spillers (later Nestle Purina) pet food factory, Metal Box (later Carnaud Metal Box, now Crown Cork) can factory and a coal depot. The line was singled in 1972 with the lifting of the down line.

Disused railways
Coldham; Line and station closed	British Rail; Eastern Region; Bramley Line	Walsoken; Line and station closed
Terminus	Wisbech & Upwell; Tramway	Elmbridge; Line and station closed
Preceding station	Heritage railways	Following station
Proposed railways
Waldersea towards March	Bramley Line	Terminus

== Present day ==
Nothing remains of Wisbech East, the station site having been entirely redeveloped and replaced by the Octavia Hill Centre for people who are disabled. The Centre was itself subsequently demolished and replaced by housing.

The old Wisbech East goods yard was acquired by Spillers from Railtrack in 1995 and was last used in 2000; most of the yard now forms part of the factory and its car park. The last pet food train called in Summer 2000, although the freight-branch remains in place and runs as far as Weasenham Lane in Wisbech where the former level crossing was tarmaced over in 2005.

== Possible restoration ==
In 2003, the Bramley Line group was formed to investigate the possibility of reinstating the line from Wisbech to a new temporary station named "March Elm Road". The group propose to construct a new Wisbech East station. Alternative proposals have also been put forward by the local council and the Association of Train Operating Companies. In February 2017, plans to restore the route using 'ultra cheap' no frills trains were proposed by building a branch line to Wisbech.

== See also ==
- Wisbech North railway station
