= Eastern Counties Railway =

Former English railway company

Overview
- Locale: East Anglia, East London
- Dates of operation: 1839–1862
- Successor: Great Eastern Railway

Technical
- Track gauge: 4 ft 8 1/2 in (1,435 mm) standard gauge (1844–1862)
- Previous gauge: 5 ft (1,524 mm) (1839–1844)

The Eastern Counties Railway (ECR) was an English railway company incorporated in 1836 intended to link London with Ipswich via Colchester, and then extend to Norwich and Yarmouth.

Construction began in 1837 on the first 9 miles (14 km) at the London end. Construction was beset by engineering and other problems, leading to severe financial difficulties. As a result, the project was truncated at Colchester in 1843 but through a series of acquisitions (including the Eastern Union Railway who completed the link between Colchester and Norwich) and opening of other lines, the ECR became the largest of the East Anglian railways.

In 1862 ECR was merged with a number of other companies to form the Great Eastern Railway.

== Opening ==
In 1835, a surveyor called Henry Sayer presented a plan for a new railway from London to York via Cambridge to London solicitors Dimes & Boyman. Together with John Clinton Robertson who was to become the first secretary of the ECR and engineers John Braithwaite it was concluded that this scheme was too optimistic and a scheme from London to Norwich via Colchester and Ipswich would be more viable.

Eastern Counties Railway Act 1836
- Act of Parliament
- Parliament of the United Kingdom
- Long title: An Act for making a Railway from London to Norwich and Yarmouth, by Romford, Chelmsford, Colchester, and Ipswich, to be called "The Eastern Counties Railway."
- Citation: 6 & 7 Will. 4. c. cvi

Dates
- Royal assent: 4 July 1836

Other legislation
- Amended by: Eastern Counties Railway Act 1838

Text of statute as originally enacted

Eastern Counties Railway Act 1838
- Act of Parliament
- Parliament of the United Kingdom
- Long title: An Act to amend and enlarge the Powers and Provisions of the Act relating to the Eastern Counties Railway.
- Citation: 1 & 2 Vict. c.lxxxi

Dates
- Royal assent: 27 July 1838

Other legislation
- Amends: Eastern Counties Railway Act 1836

Text of statute as originally enacted

A tour of the key towns on the route followed where considerable opposition from landowners, from sections of the press and members of the public was encountered. Despite this the prospectus of the Grand Eastern Counties Railway was first prepared in 1834 by John Braithwaite. The bill was introduced into the House of Commons on 19 February 1836, and after a stormy passage (two rival schemes had also surfaced in the interim as well as continuing opposition from land owners), it was authorised by an act of Parliament, the Eastern Counties Railway Act 1836 (6 & 7 Will. 4. c. cvi) on 4 July 1836.

Construction of the line began in late March 1837 and progress east of Stratford was relatively easy as the land was largely arable. Indeed, a good number of windmills had to be demolished in order to get the railway built. West of Stratford the line had to cross the unstable Bow Marshes and after that, the built-up nature of the area meant that the railway had to be built on expensive viaducts.

The two-track railway opened on 20 June 1839 from a temporary terminus at Devonshire Street in Mile End, Middlesex, as far as Romford in Essex. On opening day, two trains topped and tailed by locomotives proceeded along the line watched by crowds of people. Guests of the company enjoyed a sumptuous banquet at Romford enlivened by the sound of cannon and the band of the Coldstream Guards. The strain of building the initial line and continuing disputes with landowners continued to take its toll on the company's finances. ECR backers in Norfolk and Suffolk were demanding work start in their area and the company was forced to go to Parliament to increase its capital, although this move was rejected. Later in 1839 shareholders decided a call for £3 per share should be made (in effect an additional payment by them) although this was reduced to £2 per share in January 1840 which released enough money for the ECR to continue construction.

On 1 July 1840, the ECR opened an extension at the London end to its permanent terminus at Shoreditch (renamed Bishopsgate in 1846) and at the country end to Brentwood. The line between Stratford and Shoreditch was, from 15 September 1840, used by trains of the Northern and Eastern Railway (N&ER) whose line to Broxbourne opened, although at first the N&ER trains were not permitted to call at Stratford.

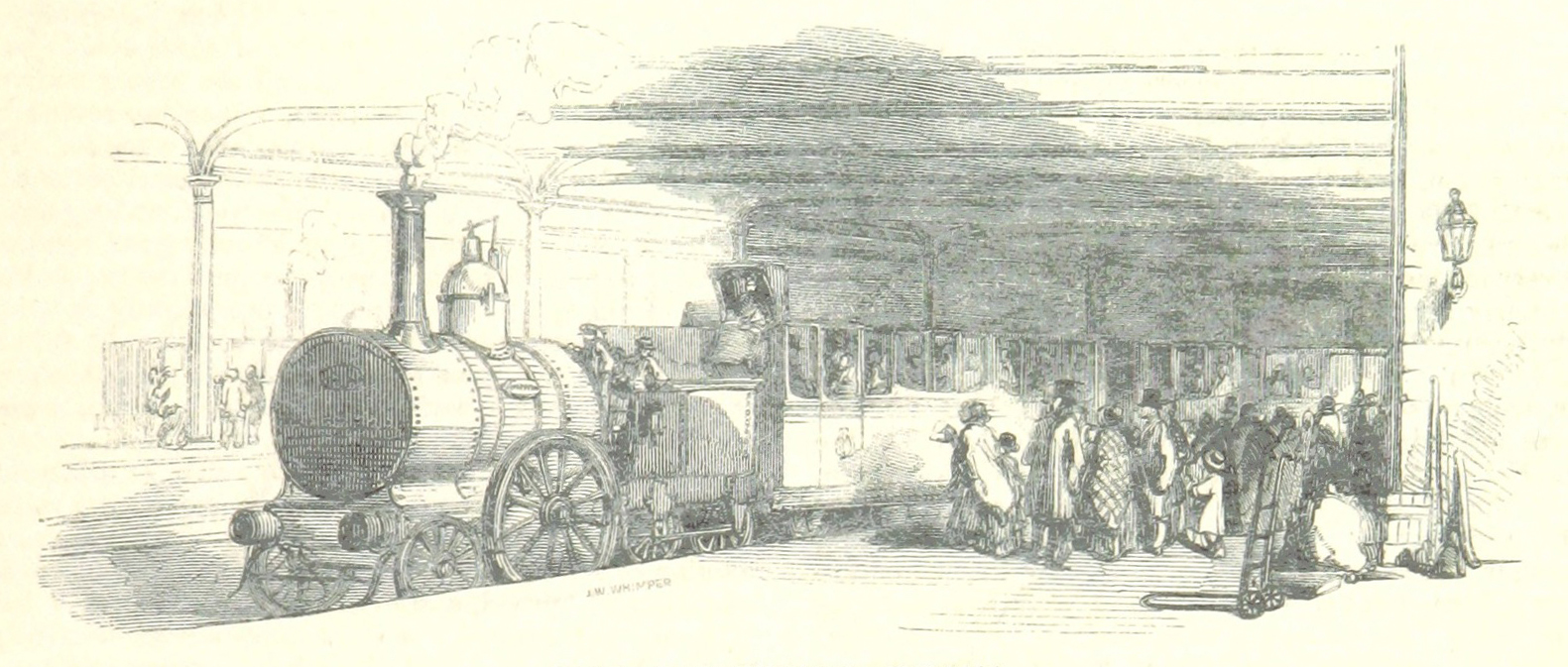
Eastern Counties Railway train, probably at Bishopsgate c. 1851

By 1840, it was clear that additional money would be required to complete the ECR line to Colchester. This stretch included 64 bridges or viaducts in addition to numerous culverts, embankments and cuttings. A successful application for more capital was made to Parliament and work continued. The winter of 1841 proved very wet and delayed work even further.

Finally on 25 February 1843, a special inspection train left Shoreditch for Colchester. However, the train was stopped at Brentwood as a timber viaduct at Mountnessing had subsided and it was unsafe to continue. On 7 March 1843, goods trains started operation followed by the commencement of passenger services on 29 March.

The costs were as follows:

Item	Cost
Construction	£1,631,330
Rolling stock	£97,000
Land, compensation, solicitors and surveyors fees.	£370,550

The line ran to Colchester, a distance of 51 miles (82 km) to Shoreditch station; the route is now part of the Great Eastern Main Line.

== Development ==
In 1843, the ECR directors were approached with a proposal to build a line from Stratford to the River Thames with the intention of sending out agricultural produce by rail with coal forming the bulk of the traffic the other way. A bill came before Parliament sponsored by the Eastern Counties, Stratford and Thames Junction Railway Company and it was the ECR that built the line through to North Woolwich opening on 14 June 1847.

As mentioned, the N&ER had built a line from Stratford – Broxbourne and shared the ECR Shoreditch terminus. This railway had extended to Bishop's Stortford in 1842 and Hertford East in 1843 and was in the process of extending its line towards Cambridge. Following on from negotiations in 1843, the ECR took over operation of the N&ER from 1 January 1844 paying rent and dividing the profits until this railway was finally acquired by the Great Eastern Railway in 1902.

Eastern Counties Railway Company (Ely, Brandon and Peterborough Extension) Act 1844
- Act of Parliament
- Parliament of the United Kingdom
- Long title: An Act to enable the Eastern Counties Railway Company to make a Railway from the Northern and Eastern Railway at Newport, by Cambridge to Ely, and from thence Eastward to Brandon, and Westward to Peterborough.
- Citation: 7 & 8 Vict. c. lxii

Dates
- Royal assent: 4 July 1844

Following the acquisition of the N&ER the ECR concentrated on building the line towards Newport (Essex) and on 4 July 1844, Parliament passed the Eastern Counties Railway Company (Ely, Brandon and Peterborough Extension) Act 1844 (7 & 8 Vict. c. lxii) authorising the ECR to extend to Cambridge and Brandon in Norfolk where an end on connection with the Norfolk Railway would offer a through route to Norwich. This route opened on 29 July 1845.

In 1845, the ECR was surveying towards Ardleigh with the intention of extending to Harwich although this scheme failed to get parliamentary backing.

Late in 1845, George Hudson was invited by the ECR shareholders to become chairman and an upswing in the lines finances resulted. Hudson then proposed various schemes designed to take the ECR towards York and Lincoln joining up with his North Midland Railway at South Milford. One scheme that came to fruition was the line from Peterborough via March to Ely which opened on 14 January 1847. Increasing passenger numbers at Bishopsgate (renamed from Shoreditch in 1846) saw that station extended in the same year.

The refusal of the ECR to extend northwards towards Ipswich led to the formation of the Eastern Union Railway, who opened their line between Colchester and Ipswich in 1846.

Cambridge and Huntingdon Railway Act 1845
- Act of Parliament
- Parliament of the United Kingdom
- Long title: An Act for enabling the Eastern Counties Railway Company to make a Railway from Cambridge to Huntingdon.
- Citation: 8 & 9 Vict. c. cci

Dates
- Royal assent: 8 August 1845

Other legislation
- Repealed by: Great Eastern Railway Act 1862

Status: Repealed

Text of statute as originally enacted

Eastern Counties Railway Act 1847
- Act of Parliament
- Parliament of the United Kingdom
- Long title: An Act to enable the Eastern Counties Railway Company to enlarge their London and Stratford Stations; and to amend some of the Provisions of the Acts relating to the Eastern Counties Railway Company.
- Citation: 10 & 11 Vict. c. clvii

Dates
- Royal assent: 9 July 1847

Text of statute as originally enacted

Eastern Counties (Cambridge to Bedford Railway) Act 1847
- Act of Parliament
- Parliament of the United Kingdom
- Long title: An Act to enable the Eastern Counties Railway Company to make a Railway from the Eastern Counties Railway near Cambridge to the Bedford and Bletchley Railway at or near Bedford, with Branches.
- Citation: 10 & 11 Vict. c. clviii

Dates
- Royal assent: 9 July 1847

Other legislation
- Repealed by: Great Eastern Railway Act 1862

Status: Repealed

Text of statute as originally enacted

Eastern Counties (Wisbech to Spalding) Railway Act 1847
- Act of Parliament
- Parliament of the United Kingdom
- Long title: An Act to enable the Eastern Counties Railway Company to make a Railway from Wisbech to Spalding.
- Citation: 10 & 11 Vict. c. ccxxxv

Dates
- Royal assent: 22 July 1847

Other legislation
- Repealed by: Great Eastern Railway Act 1862

Status: Repealed

Text of statute as originally enacted

Other ECR openings in 1847 included to Wisbech East on 3 May and on 17 August, Cambridge to St Ives where a junction with the East Anglian Railways' (EAR) St Ives to Huntingdon line was created. In fact the ECR operated the St Ives to Huntingdon line on behalf of the EAR, but it proved so unprofitable that they threatened to withdraw from the arrangement in October 1849. In the end operation by the ECR restarted with them paying the EAR 25 shillings per day to do so.

The financial depression of 1847–48 saw the ECR rein back some of its ambitions although the loop line from St Ives to March was opened on 1 February 1848 and the ECR took over the working of the Norfolk Railway on 2 May which extended the ECR empire to Fakenham, Lowestoft and Great Yarmouth. Construction also started on a branch to Maldon East in March 1847 and the first goods trains ran in August 1848 followed by the opening to passenger trains on 2 October of the same year.

By 1849, things were going poorly for ECR chairman George Hudson, and following his non-attendance at the AGM the shareholders, who had received a very small dividend, set up a committee to look into his financial management of the company.

A short branch to Enfield was opened on 1 March 1849. This linked to Angel Road station (then called Edmonton). Later the same month the Dereham to Fakenham line, the building of which had been started by the Norfolk Railway, was opened by the ECR on 20 March 1849.

The ECR did not enjoy good relations with the London and Blackwall Railway (L&BR). They had built the London and Blackwall Extension Railway from Stepney East which was supposed to have a junction with the ECR at Bow Junction. This was not connected and an ill-served interchange station called Victoria Park & Bow lasted until 1850. Both the L&BR and the ECR had been promoting railways to Tilbury and it was in September 1851 that the L&BR directors asked George Parker Bidder to approach the ECR with regard to a joint bill.

There were no additions to the ECR network in 1850, and in 1851 a short branch from what is now Shepreth Branch Junction near Shelford to Shepreth was built. Back in 1848 Parliament granted authority to the Royston and Hitchin Railway to extend their line from Royston. Although Cambridge was its goal, Parliament sanctioned only an extension as far as Shepreth (as the Eastern Counties Railway had opposed the extension to Cambridge). The line was completed in 1851 and initially the Great Northern Railway (GNR), who had leased the Royston and Hitchin Railway in the interim, ran a connecting horse-drawn omnibus service. This proved unsuccessful so the new line and the line to Hitchin were leased to the Eastern Counties Railway for 14 years, with a connection at Shepreth to enable the ECR to run trains from Cambridge to Hitchin.

In 1852, the ECR took over operation of the East Anglian Railways (EAR). The company's property had been taken over by the receiver in June 1850 and the EAR was leased to the GNR. The GNR had running powers over the ECR line between Peterborough, March and Wisbech (opened 1847). Unfortunately, they had not applied for running rights over the line that linked the ECR and EAR stations at Wisbech and the ECR refused access so that the passengers had to change stations by omnibus. However, shareholder opposition within the GNR and EAR were the real reason why the GNR withdrew from the arrangement allowing the ECR to take over operation of the EAR.

In 1853, the Eastern Union Railway (EUR) was in serious financial trouble having built lines to Norwich, Bury St Edmunds (as the Ipswich and Bury Railway), Sudbury and had a branch to Harwich under construction. Negotiations began between the EUR and ECR and on 1 January 1854 the ECR took over the working of the EUR although this was not formally ratified until the Eastern Counties and the Norfolk and Eastern Union, the East Anglian, and the Newmarket Railways Act 1854 (17 & 18 Vict. c. ccxx) of 7 August 1854. The two companies did not formally merge until they amalgamated with other railways to form the Great Eastern Railway in 1862.

The Harwich branch whilst built by the EUR was opened by the ECR, the following week on 15 August.

The ECR also took over the Newmarket Railway in 1854 which linked Cambridge with Ipswich Bury St Edmunds.

In 1854, the ECR/L&BR owned London Tilbury and Southend Railway started operating over the Forest Gate Junction to Bow Junction and onto Fenchurch Street. Early trains split at Stratford with a portion of the train to Bishopsgate station. A third line between Stratford and Bow Junction was built to help accommodate this traffic and ECR services had running rights into Fenchurch Street via the London and Blackwall Railway extension route.

A line was also provided linking Victoria Park station on the North London Railway with Stratford Low Level and Stratford Market stations which was primarily for goods traffic. The Loughton branch of the ECR was opened on 22 August 1856 with a junction just north of Stratford on the Cambridge line.

In 1859, the East Suffolk Railway (ESR) finished building a series of lines in Suffolk and south east Norfolk. These were all taken over by the ECR on opening day 1 June 1859. The ECR line from Ipswich (East Suffolk Junction) to Woodbridge (at the south end of the ESR) also opened on this day giving a through route between Ipswich, Lowestoft and Great Yarmouth (South Town).

The final railway opened by the ECR before the incorporation of the Great Eastern Railway (GER) in 1862 took place on 12 April 1860, when the Leiston branch in East Suffolk was extended to Aldeburgh.

== Operations ==
=== Accidents and incidents ===
- In September 1840, a train was in a rear-end collision with a passenger train at Old Ford, Middlesex. One person was killed.
- On 8 May 1846, Elizabeth Ingham was killed whilst operating at Little Thetford Crossing. Her 3-year-old had followed onto the tracks and into the path of an oncoming train. She successfully rushed to save her child, but was hit by the train and killed instantly.
- In November 1846, an Inquest was held at the New Inn, Roydon, yesterday week, (Note: 'Yesterday week' means the same day as yesterday in the previous week, that is eight days ago.) on the body of Elizabeth Coleman, aged eleven years, who was killed upon the above line. The deceased was, it appeared, endeavouring to cross the line at a point near the Roydon station where the Lockroad crosses the line on a level, when she was struck by the buffer of a Cambridge train, and killed upon the spot. The jury returned a verdict of "Accidental death". The inquest would have taken place on Wednesday, 25 November 1846
- In September 1853, a freight train came to a halt near Brandon, Suffolk, due to a defect on the locomotive. The driver of a second freight train ignored a red signal and consequently his train was in a rear-end collision with the first. Time interval working was in force.
- On 20 February 1860, a passenger train derailed at Tottenham, Middlesex, when a tyre broke on the locomotive hauling it. Seven people were killed.

=== Engine sheds and works ===
The first engine shed was located at Whalebone Lane, Chadwell Heath opening in 1839 with the railway. Following the extension of the ECR to Brentwood in 1840, a "railway factory" at Romford (between the current stations of Chadwell Heath and Gidea Park (on the east side of the line) was built being fully operational by 1842. The most significant task the factory undertook was the gauge conversion of the ECR stock in 1844.

As the ECR, grew it became apparent that a new site would be needed and land was acquired at Stratford between the ECR Colchester line and the N&ER line to Cambridge. The N&ER had already established an engine shed at this location when their line to Broxbourne had opened in 1840.

At this stage, Stratford was a largely rural location with plenty of land being available and in connection with this move the ECR built 300 new houses for the work force.

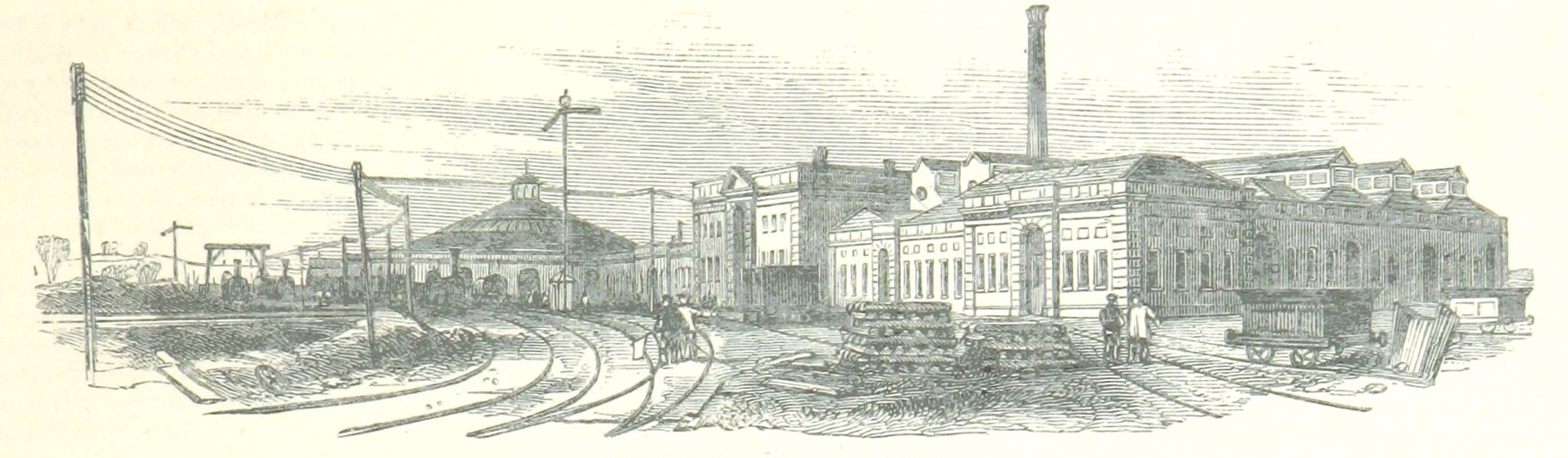
Stratford Works

Stratford engine shed and Stratford Works initially shared this site and it was not until the 1860s that the GER moved the engine sheds to the other side of the Cambridge line.

Various other engine sheds grew up around the expanding ECR network either being constructed by the ECR or the railways it took over; for example Ipswich engine shed which was built by the Eastern Union Railway.

=== Locomotives ===
==== Early Eastern Counties locomotives ====
In order to build the line, the ECR purchased four 0-4-0 locomotives for hauling ballast. These were delivered in late 1838 and named Suffolk, Norfolk, Essex and Middlesex. These and the next six engines ordered were built by Braithwaite, Milner and Co. Six 2-2-0 locomotives (original numbers 1 to 6) were the first ECR passenger engines and had a poor reputation with regard to derailments. Braithwaite, Milner and Co supplied another similar locomotive in 1839 which was number 7. Two 0-4-0 goods engines (8 and 9) were also ordered from Braithwaite, Milner and Co in 1840 lasting until 1849 when they were sold.

In 1841, Lancashire firm Jones, Turner and Evans supplied four 2-2-0 locomotives (Nos 12 to 15) which lasted until 1850. Later the same year Burys supplied two 0-4-2 passenger locomotives (Nos 10 and 11) to the ECR.

Numbers 16 and 17 were 2-2-0 passenger singles ordered from Bury and Co and were in service in early 1842. Later in 1842 the ECR board ordered eight more Bury singles (Nos 18 to 26). Some of these engines survived until 1859–60. These were all the locomotives purchased before the acquisition of the Northern and Eastern Railway in 1844 and the gauge conversion of late 1844 when many of these engines were converted to UK standard gauge at the Romford factory.

==== Locomotive fleet as at 1856 ====
As described above, the ECR grew up in piecemeal fashion at times ordering its own locomotives, and then acquiring other companies' locomotives when the firms were taken over. This makes the history quite complex and the table below is an overview of the company's locomotives in 1856.

Running number	Builder	Number in class	Notes
1–3	Wilson & Co	3	Small tank engines purchased from contractor Samuel Morton Peto
4–6	Longridge	3	built 1851–52 J V Gooch 2-2-2WT A Class
7–12	ECR	5	built 1853–54 J V Gooch 2-2-2WT B Class
13–16	Sharp & Co	4	ex Eastern Union Railway Nos 27, 29, 30 and 31 respectively 2-2-2WT built 1846–47
17	Kitson & Co	1	ex Eastern Union Railway No 28 Ariel's Girdle 2-2-0WT
18–19	Wilson & Co	2	Rebuilt by ECR to 2-4-0ST for shunting at Bishopsgate Goods Depot
20–25	ECR	6	built 1852 J V Gooch 2-2-2WT A Class. No 20 was the first locomotive built at Stratford Works
26	Longridge	1	Former Northern and Eastern Railway single — 2-2-2 built 1840.
27	ECR	1	New Gooch designed C Class 2-2-2 introduced in October 1856.
28–30	Stephenson/Longridge	3	Former Northern and Eastern Railway singles — 2-2-2 built 1840. The previous number 27 (in this particular numbering scheme) was also one of these locomotives.
31–36	Gilkes	6	Ex Newmarket Railway 2-4-0s built 1848 added to stock 1851.
37–41	Wilson & Co	4	Originally part of a cancelled order for the East Lancashire Railway. built 1846 2-4-0 ?
42	Tayleur & Co	1	Ex Norfolk Railway no 13
43–44	Jones & Potts	2	built 1845 2-2-2
45–48	Stephenson	4	ex Norfolk Railway nos 4, 6, 7, 8.
51–67	Stothert & Slaughter	17	51–60 built 1845, 61–67 built 1846–47. Two of the earlier examples were involved in derailments, forcing later modifications. Built for the opening of the ECR's Brandon extension and used on passenger trains. Despite the inauspicious start, the locomotives lasted until the 1870s and several were based at Cambridge engine shed.
68–77	Stephenson	10	built 1846–47 2-4-0 goods engines. Nos 98–102 were part of same order.
78–81	Jones & Potts	6	2-4-0 Goods engines built 1846–47 – Nos 182–187 were part of the same order (originally numbered 82–87).
82–87	Stephenson	5	Built 1847–48 2-4-0.
88–93, 96–97	Jones & Potts	8	Note non sequential numbers being withdrawn at this time. Built 1846–47 2-2-2-0.
94	ECR	1	A Gooch C class 2-2-2 under construction at Stratford
95	Stephenson	1	Ex Midland Railway no 70 purchased 1847
98–102	Stephenson	5	built 1846 4-2-0 passenger engines but all rebuilt as 2-2-2 by 1852
103–107	Wilson & Co	5	103–105 built 1847, 106 and 107 built 1848 Jenny Lind type engines.
108–117	Sharp & Co	10	Former East Anglian Railways locomotives built 1846.
118–119	Wilson & Co?	2	4-2-0 built 1846
120	Hawthorn	1	Built 1843 but to ECR 1845. Little known about this engine apart from it was ordered by George Hudson.
122–123	Bury & Co	2	4-2-0 built 1846
124	Jones & Potts	1	Ex Norfolk Railway no 12 – possibly rebuilt as a 2-4-0.
125–128	Bury & Co	3	One not in service? Further 4-2-0 types built 1846?
129	Stephenson	10	Former ECR ballast engine built 1838 rebuilt as 0-4-0T.
130–139	Stephenson	10	Ex Norfolk Railway 0-6-0 built 1846–47 — rebuilt by Sinclair 1861.
141–144	Tayleur & Co	4	ex Norfolk Railway nos. 10, 11, 14, 15. 0-6-0?
145–146	Longridge	2	built 1846 as 0-4-2 but rebuilt by Kitsons as 2-4-0 in 1849.
147–149	Kitson & Co	3	built 1846–47 0-6-0
151–152	Jones & Potts	1	built 1846 0-6-0. Rebuilt 1849 Tayleur & Co. Goods engines for Brandon extension
154	Stephenson	1	built 1847 0-6-0 Goods engine
155–161	Stothert & Slaughter	7	built 1846–47 0-6-0 goods engines
162–164	Sharp Brothers	3	Two were former East Anglian Railways 0-4-2 goods locomotives.
163–168	Stothert & Slaughter	6	built 1847–48 0-6-0 goods engines
170–171	Jones & Potts	2	2-4-0 built 1846. Goods engines for the Brandon extension.
172–181	Tayleur & Co	10	Built 1847 2-4-0.The reference leads to a drawing of these locomotives.
182–187	Jones & Potts	4	See Nos. 78–81 — these built 1847–48
184–187	Tayleur & Co	2	Being introduced
188	Bury & Co	1	Bury type 0-4-2 goods locomotive.
189–192	Stephenson	4	0-4-2? goods locomotives. 189 built in 1847, 190–192 built in 1849 and fitted with solid wrought iron wheels.
193–200	Wilson & Co	8	2-4-0 Goods engines 193–195 built 1847. 196–200 built 1849
201–204	Jones & Potts	4	Originally built as 2-2-2 locomotives and nicknamed Jumpers because of their propensity to derail. 201–203 were rebuilt as 2-4-0 goods engines by Gooch c. 1852. 204 was an identical locomotive but former Norfolk Railway No 12
205–213	Stothert & Slaughter	9	ex Eastern Union Railway Nos. 7, 8 (2-2-2) 9, 10 (0-4-2) 19–21 (2-2-2) and 22–26 (0-4-2) respectively built 1846–48
214–219	Canada Works	6	J V Gooch C Class 2-2-2 Built 1855–56 — ordered at same time as 274–279 and known as Butterflies.
220–223	Tayleur & Co	4	Ex Norfolk Railway Nos 16–19.
224–227	Stephenson	4	Ex Norfolk Railway Nos 20–23.
228, 231, 232	Tayleur & Co	3	Ex Norfolk Railway Nos 25, 28 and 29.
233–237	Wilson & Co	4	Gooch 1854–55 rebuilds of ECR Cramptons as 0-6-0 goods engines. Nicknamed floating batteries.
238–243	Sharp Brothers	6	Further orders of the Butterflies (see nos 214–219 above). These and nos 244–249 were ordered at the same time and delivered during 1855. The tenders were built at Stratford Works.
244–249	Kitson & Co	6	See above
250–259	ECR	10	built 1854–55 J V Gooch 2-2-2WT A Class for operation on the LTSR.
260–270	Sharp Brothers	11	ex Eastern Union Railway Nos. 1–6, 14–19 respectively 2-2-2 built 1846–47
271–273	Hawthorn	3	ex Eastern Union Railway Nos. 11, 12, 13 respectively 2-2-2 built 1846–47
274–279	Canada Works	6	Express 2-2-2 locomotives delivered in 1856.
280–283	ECR	3	further Gooch designed 2-2-2 express locomotives delivered in 1856–57

==== Robert Sinclair ====
Robert Sinclair took over as Locomotive Superintendent after Gooch’s departure. In 1858, he designed a small class of 2-4-0 (known as Z class) built by Rothwell and Co. These were locomotives numbered 301 to 306.

As can be seen from the table above, he inherited a mixed bag of locomotives and set out on a road of standardisation. Perhaps the best example of this was his Y class 2-4-0 introduced in 1859, which when finished (in Great Eastern days and after Sinclair had departed the company) numbered 110 locomotives. Although the general design was the same the locomotives were built by a number of different companies including Kitsons, Vulcan and in 1865 (in GER days) the French railway firm Schneider at cie.

The ECR sent the first Y class No 327 (an example built by Stephenson) to the 1862 International Exhibition where it caught the eye of the Egyptian government who ordered 11 similar locomotives.

Sinclair’s only other design (for the ECR) was the five strong X class 2-4-0WT introduced in 1862 and built at Stratford Works. Numbered 120 to 124 (noting the similarly numbered locomotives in the above table had been renumbered or withdrawn) these were deployed on the line to North Woolwich.

=== Carriages ===
The Railway Act 1844 laid down standards for third-class carriages. Facilities were very spartan with wooden benches seating 46 passengers who could access the three compartments through three doors. The middle compartment seated 18 passengers whilst the end compartments seated 14 each.

It is known that carriages were built at Stratford Works and Fairfield Works in Bow.

An ECR first class carriage has survived and is part of the UK national collection.

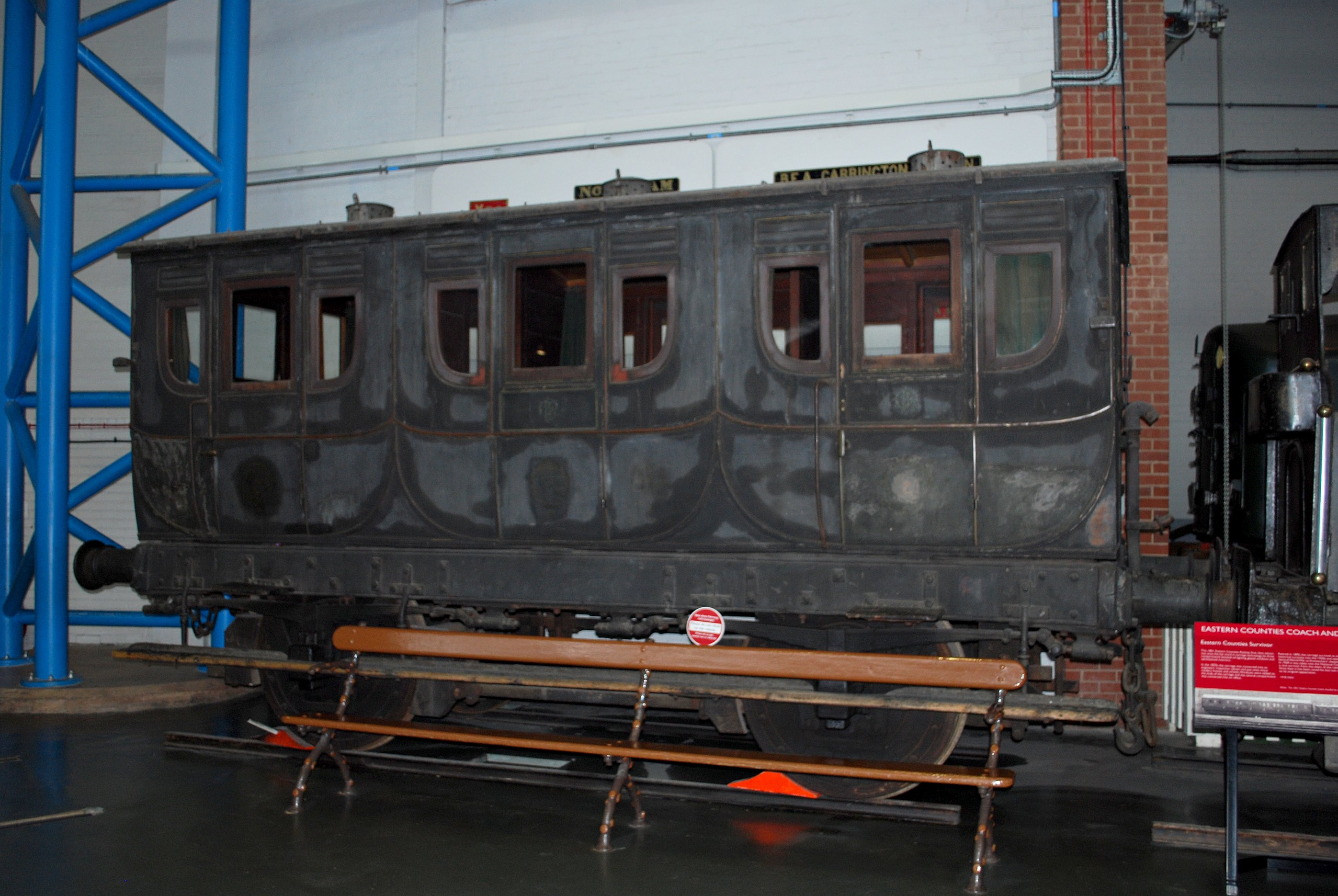
Eastern Counties Railway 1st Class carriage

=== Goods traffic ===
Goods traffic on the ECR was largely agricultural in nature. The table below shows a breakdown of the traffic carried week ending 6 May 1849.

Type	Amount
Cattle	1,537
Sheep	3,540
Pigs	254
Grain	17,431 sacks
Flour	6,874 sacks
Wool	65 tons
Fresh meat	209 tons
Poultry	51 tons
Fresh fish	219 tons
Fruit and vegetables	274 tons
Ale	246 tons
Wine and spirits	80 tons
Milk	20,672 quarts
Bread	63 quatern (4 lb) loaves
General merchandise	2,433 tons

=== Innovations ===
==== Use of steam excavating machine ====
Railways in the UK were generally built by pick, shovel and large numbers of railway navvies. Engineer John Braithwaite deployed the first steam excavating machine used on a UK railway at Brentwood (exact date unknown but working in 1843).

==== Two wheel pony truck ====
The ECR was the first railway company to use a two-wheel pony truck, in 1859, using the design of American inventor Levi Bissell. This innovation was patented in the USA on 2 November 1858 and on 1 December 1858 in Great Britain. In the summer of 1859 the ECR fitted the truck to locomotive 248, a Kitsons built 2-4-0 of 1855, and it was reported that the ride of the locomotive was improved and wheel flange wear noticeably reduced.

==== An early steam coach ====
In 1849 the ECR introduced a steam rail motor called Enfield which worked on the Enfield Branch Line. This locomotive was a 2-2-0 locomotive and 36-seat four-compartment coach on one frame and was built by William Bridges Adams in 1849 at Fairfield Works, Bow. It proved reasonably successful and in fact not long after delivery covered the 126-mile (203 km) route from Bishopsgate to Norwich via Cambridge in a creditable (for the time) 3 hours 35 minutes.

Enfield was later converted to a 2-2-2T locomotive as the difficulty of a combined locomotive/carriage (presumably too long for early turntables?) became apparent.

=== Track gauge ===
At the time of the railway's construction, there was no legislation dictating the choice of gauge. The ECR directors favoured the Great Western Railway's broad gauge of 7 ft (2,134 mm) but, mainly on the grounds of cost, construction engineer John Braithwaite recommended a gauge of 5 ft (1,524 mm). The N&ER, which was planning to use the ECR between Stratford and Bishopsgate, was forced to adopt the same gauge.

With the extension of the ECR in the early 1840s, it became apparent that 4 ft 8 1/2 in (1,435 mm) standard gauge was a better choice, and in September and October 1844 gauge conversion was carried out, along with the N&ER, which had merged with the ECR on 1 January 1844.

== People ==
=== Railway organisation (1830s and 1840s) ===
The directors were responsible for appointing staff whilst a finance committee decided the wages. The engineer was responsible for rolling stock and permanent way whilst the traffic manager dealt with operations. Stations were run by a police sergeant who had ticket clerks under them and they reported to a number of inspectors and an overall manager. Other policemen were responsible for the operation of points and signals as well as more familiar duties. Conductors were in charge of trains assisted by guards and a small number of porters.

=== Locomotive superintendents ===
- John Hunter 1846–1850
- John Viret Gooch 1850–1856 was dismissed for financial irregularities (details on that entry).
- Robert Sinclair 1856–1863 was the first Locomotive Superintendent of the Great Eastern Railway.

=== Chairmen ===
- William Tite the architect, was the first chairman.
- 1836–1845 Henry Bosanquet – a director of the Westminster Bank
- 1845–1849 George Hudson

Hudson was appointed chairman of the ailing Eastern Counties Railway in 1845 and one of his first actions was to appoint David Waddington as his vice chairman. Hudson was interested in the ECR as he felt it offered an opportunity for an alternative route from York to London although the truth was the ECR had an appalling reputation for time keeping and safety at this time; Hudson immediately ordered the payment of a generous dividend for the shareholders.

Later investigation showed that whilst Hudson decided the levels of dividends to be paid to shareholders it was Waddington's job to doctor the traffic accounts to make it appear legally earned. Waddington also siphoned off £8,000 of the ECR's money into a parliamentary slush fund which strained relations between Hudson and Waddington.

Hudson cut costs in a similar way on the North Midland Railway and an accident at Romford on 18 July 1846 led the satirical magazine Punch to petition Hudson to the effect that:

"by reason of the misconduct, negligence and insobriety of drivers and sundry stokers, engineers, policemen, and others, your Majesty's subjects, various and several collisions, explosions and oversettings are continually taking place on the railways, your Majesty's dominion".

- 1849–1850 Edward Ladd Betts – rail contractor and business partner of Samuel Morton Peto.
- 1851–1856 David Waddington – Waddington had been vice-chairman under the Hudson regime and was dismissed after investigation of financial irregularities along with Gooch.
- 1856–1862 Horatio Love – Love was the first chairman of the Great Eastern Railway between 1862 and 1863.

== Woolwich Ferry ==
Following the opening of the line to North Woolwich the ECR ordered two ferries called Essex and Kent from Blyth & Co of Barking. The two wooden paddle steamers weighed 65 tons (gross), 78.5 ft (23.9 m) long, 14.9 ft (4.5 m) beam and 7.3 ft (2.2 m) depth. The cost for each boat was £3,250.

Between June and August 1854, 113,315 passengers used the ferry, whilst a year later this had risen to 141,025. In 1856 the two ferries were overhauled at Blyth & Co and continued in use on the ferry for a number of years after the 1862 merger with the Great Eastern.

== Merger into the Great Eastern Railway ==
Between 1851 and 1854 the ECR had under the chairmanship of David Waddington negotiated arrangements to work most of the other railways in East Anglia resulting in a network of lines totalling 565 miles (909 km). Whilst Parliament favoured competition it was also aware that the ECR was constantly at war with its neighbours and whilst these working arrangements were approved there was a condition that a bill for full amalgamation was to be presented to Parliament by 1861.

Waddington departed under a cloud in 1856 and was replaced by Horatio Love. By 1860 many shareholders were unhappy, listing several grievances they saw as getting in the way of their dividend payments. These included continual conflict over the working of other lines, suspicion and distrust of the joint committee, inadequate services to and from London, ongoing litigation and legal costs and a lack of progress on amalgamation.

By February 1862 the bill had its second reading and was then followed by a lengthy committee process where various parties petitioned against the bill. On 7 August 1862 the bill passed and the Great Eastern Railway was formed by the amalgamation of the Eastern Counties Railway and a number of smaller railways.
