= Wisbech and March line =

Disused railway in East Anglia, England

Coordinates: 52.613°N 0.152°E

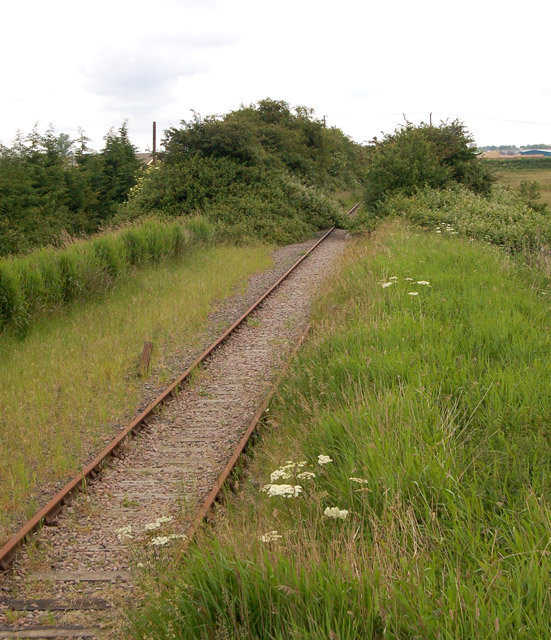
- Track south of Wisbech, June 2009

Overview
- Status: Disused, under consideration for partial re-opening
- Owner: Network Rail
- Locale: England
- Termini: March; Wisbech East

Service
- Type: Rail proposal
- System: National Rail

History
- Opened: 1847
- Closed: 1968 (to passengers); 2000 (to freight)

Technical
- Track gauge: 4 ft 8 1/2 in (1,435 mm)

The Wisbech and March line is a disused railway line between March and Wisbech in Cambridgeshire, England. A number of proposals are currently being investigated relating to the possible restoration of passenger services along the route.

== History ==
Wisbech, St. Ives and Cambridge Junction Railway Act 1846
- Act of Parliament
- Parliament of the United Kingdom
- Long title: An Act for making Railways from Wisbech to Saint Ives and to Fenny-Drayton, to be called "The Wisbech, Saint Ives, and Cambridge Junction Railway."
- Citation: 9 & 10 Vict. c. ccclvi

Dates
- Royal assent: 7 August 1846

Other legislation
- Repealed by: Great Eastern Railway Act 1862

Status: Repealed

Text of statute as originally enacted

The passing of the Wisbech, St. Ives and Cambridge Junction Railway Act 1846 (9 & 10 Vict. c. ccclvi) authorised the construction of two lines from March railway station: a 7.8-mile (12.6 km) line to the Market town and Port of Wisbech which was reached by an almost straight north-easterly route across The Fens and a line south to the market town of St Ives. The double-track line to Wisbech was the first to open on 3 May 1847 followed by the St Ives line nine months later. Before the line was completed the Wisbech, March, and St Ives Railway (as the company had renamed itself) was taken over by the Eastern Counties Railway; which would itself become part the Great Eastern Railway in 1862. Wisbech was served by a station constructed in the town centre and named "Wisbeach", with Coldham the only other station between Wisbech and March.

A second line reached Wisbech in March 1848 with the opening of a single-track 9.5-mile (15.3 km) line constructed by the East Anglian Railways from Watlington Junction. Although a connection for freight was made between the two lines, passengers initially had to walk from one station to the other to make a through journey, until the Eastern Counties Railway took over the East Anglian Railways in 1852. Both stations continued to exist until 1863 when the Great Eastern Railway consolidated all passenger services at the through station, with the original terminus station becoming a goods station for freight.

The through station was renamed Wisbech East after nationalisation of the railways to distinguish it from another Wisbech station which had been opened by the Midland and Great Northern Joint Railway on the northern side of the river in 1866, that was given the name Wisbech North (closed to passengers in 1959).

Although not recommended for closure in the Beeching Report of 1963, the series of lines around Wisbech were gradually closed from the 1960s onwards. Coldham station was closed in 1966, followed by the station at Wisbech and the line from Wisbech to Watlington in September 1968. The line between March and Wisbech remained open for freight traffic until Summer 2000, carrying steel coil for the Metal Box factory, and occasional parcels, coal and pet food trains from Nestle Purina, but was singled in March 1972 with the lifting of the down rails.

Wisbech was left with no passenger service since 1968, and no railway connection at all since 2000.

== State of the route ==
Wisbech East Station was lost to redevelopment following closure in 1968 and the station site was obliterated by a housing development in 2001.

The track now ends at Weasenham Lane crossing following the tarmacing over of the rails from the level crossing in 2005. Beyond this point, the old Wisbech East Goods Yard (acquired by Nestle Purina from Railtrack in 1995) was last used in 2000. Three years after the last pet food train from Wisbech, the remaining three sidings were lifted. Most of the yard area now forms the factory and car park extension.

The single track, owned by Network Rail, is still connected to the National Rail network via Whitemoor Junction near March but locked off. New signalling was installed at the junction during late 2007 for the benefit of outward-bound engineering trains from the re-opened Whitemoor Yard, once the second-biggest freight yard in Europe during World War II and now a stabling point for engineering trains. The railway's infrastructure, including the level crossings, remains largely in place.

East of the former Wisbech East station site the trackbed has been built over meaning it would not be possible to reopen a through-line from March to Watlington without major demolition.

== Early restoration discussions ==
Plans to open the line as a passenger service have been discussed for many years. In 1974, "WAMRAC" (the Wisbech And March Railway Action Committee) was formed with the intention of reopening the Wisbech line to passenger traffic. The committee never achieved this goal, although on 1 July 1984 and the Railway Development Society (RDS, which now campaigns as Railfuture), the WAMRAC organised the last passenger train from Wisbech. This was a special train consisting of a Class 47 loco and ten British Rail Mk2 coaches, which ran from Wisbech to York and Scarborough.

Cambridgeshire County Council considered re-opening the line between March and Wisbech to passengers in 1990, however a quote from British Rail of £1.36 million for the upgrading of the then operational freight line, coupled to an annual £200,000 operating charge, meant that this proposal was dropped.

== Bramley Line Heritage Railway Trust proposal ==
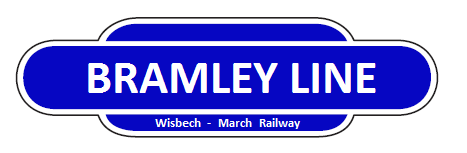
Logo of the Bramley Line project

The Wisbech March Railway Group was formed on 22 October 2003 by Wisbech businessman Peter Downs following an initiative he had raised at meetings of the local Chamber of Commerce. In response to a question as to how more visitors could be attracted to The Fens and Wisbech in particular, he suggested reinstating the railway line. Downs began making enquiries within the railway industry as to the future plans for the disused line which had seen its last freight service in 2000. An article was published in the local press to drum up support and a meeting was held which elected Downs as chairman. The railway's name was chosen and formally adopted at the meeting, after the large quantity of Bramley apples that used to be carried by rail from the area.

In December 2007 Fenland District Council refused the Bramley Line's application for £20,000 funding on the basis that the project had "no business basis" and "no practical outcome". The Council advised the group to prepare another business plan and offered to help it secure alternative funding.

The Bramley Line obtained a licence from Network Rail which permits them to clear vegetation but not to undertake track maintenance. The Track Clearance Team commenced at Coldham in July 2006 and continued until November 2014, working back towards Wisbech. The team also replaced and painted fencing at various sites and an isolated siding was laid at Waldersea, with a site office being provided to serve as the group's headquarters. The Group were working to raise the money to pay Network Rail's legal fees to obtain a lease on the line for the purposes of restoring it for tourist trains.

In February 2005 the Bramley Line Group purchased five Class 488 coaches, comprising a rake of four Standard class and one Club Class vehicles. A public appeal raised £2,500 to move the coaches to March but, following vandalism, it was decided in November 2007 that the coaches should be sold; being purchased by a New Zealand-based railway in May 2008. Bramley Line also acquired the former Smeeth Road signal box, complete with lever frame. Since closure the box had been used as a hairdressers and was complete and in good order. It was removed to a site in Wisbech, where it was stored, but not restored.

In November 2014 the project ceased work, and declined an offer of heritage rolling stock, while the future of the route is decided.

In May 2016 a working party of volunteers worked on track-laying around the proposed Waldersea station and depot.

== ATOC proposal ==
In June 2009, the Association of Train Operating Companies (ATOC) petitioned in its report Connecting Communities: Expanding Access to the Rail Network for the line to be restored as part of the national rail network as part of plans for 14 extra lines and about 40 new stations. This £12 million proposal would see hourly trains running on the existing single line between Wisbech, March and Peterborough and could be linked with Cross Country's proposed extension of Birmingham – Leicester service to Peterborough. It would serve a population of Wisbech of 26,500 and a wider station catchment area of 50,000 including villages and towns such as Long Sutton in the area between the Spalding-Peterborough line and the King's Lynn lines. A new station at Wisbech and a possible additional park and ride adjacent to the A47 would be built. The ATOC report was based on a detailed, professional, market study for reinstated railways with the aim of improving economic regeneration. The ATOC report has the active support of the Liberal Democrats, Railfuture and is being followed up by the local Conservative council.

Having reviewed the ATOC proposals the Wisbech to March Bramley Line published its position statement, with its main points being:-

1. The service proposed by ATOC is between Wisbech and Peterborough via March for which they believe an adequate express bus services already exists.
2. The capital costs to reinstate a full national rail service are at least £12m and probably more, with, for example, the Stirling to Alloa line re-instatement costing over £65 million.
3. The report in respect of the March – Wisbech line contains only an option for review not a proposal for the restoration of a service.
4. Network Rail has confirmed to the Bramley Line that the establishment of a community heritage service would not be a barrier to network services returning to the line in the future.
5. Community heritage railways require significantly less capital costs to re-establish services and lower operating costs.

A statement made by Conservative councillor Simon King, Fenland District Council's then the chairman of Overview and Scrutiny Committee, indicated that the Council "are very pleased ATOC has raised the idea of re-opening the line" and stated that, "anything Fenland District Council can do to support it we will do because it is really important for the development of the area". In November 2009 Councillor King declared his interest as a board member of the Bramleyline group in a Fenland District Council meeting. The news of the ATOC proposal was also welcomed by Wisbech's Conservative Mayor, and Conservative Cllr Kit Owen, Fenland's portfolio holder for Open for Business.

== Cambridgeshire County Council proposal ==
In 2012, Cambridgeshire County Council requested a three-phase study from Atkins into the reopening of the line for public transport. The first part, detailing "potential revenue and patronage that may arise from reintroducing passenger services on the line, with an assessment of the operational costs", was published in early 2013. It concluded that a light rail scheme could generate a £15.5m operating surplus between 2014 and 2029.

The report considers restoring the line for heavy rail, light rail and heritage railway operation, but notes that "few if any heritage railways in the UK operate a commuter service throughout the year".

== Railfuture ==
Campaigning group Railfuture have made an uncosted proposal that that line should be restored as a commuter route, providing an hourly service to Cambridge, with a maximum suggested journey time of 35 minutes. They compare their case for restoring the service to the completed Stirling-Alloa-Kincardine rail link.

In March 2014 the route was declared by Stephen Hammond, the transport minister, to be a "strategic priority". The project cost was considered to be between £35 and £52 million but the route was still felt to have the potential to be profitable, with up to 78,000 people expected to make the journey from Wisbech to Peterborough. In February 2015 David Cameron stated that he intended to "have a proper look at Wisbech to March line and to see whether this can work. Infrastructure is a big part of our plan for the east of England."

== No-frill train trials ==
In February 2017, it was announced that no-frills trains would be trialled on Britain's railways with proposals including the Wisbech Line.

== Campaign for Better Transport Expanding Railway Report ==
This line has been identified by Campaign for a Better Transport as a priority 1 candidate for reopening.

== Proposed reopening ==
At a meeting in July 2020 Cambridgeshire and Peterborough Combined Authority voted to recommend plans for a service of two trains an hour between Wisbech, March, Ely, and Cambridge, and in March 2021 authorised £300,000 to prepare a detailed business case for Network Rail. If successful, it was suggested that works could be undertaken between 2024 and 2027, following works in development to improve capacity around Ely, with services beginning in 2028. A journey from Wisbech to Cambridge would take about 45 minutes.

In a review response in 2022, Network Rail identified a number of areas which it said needed deeper consideration before proposals could be assessed further. In particular it highlighted that any Wisbech–Cambridge service plans would rely on train paths being available through Ely, without the proposals having considered whether this could be achieved.

According to Network Rail even if its current proposals to increase capacity through the junctions at Ely gain government funding, which could increase the number of through trains from 6.5 to 11 per hour, all of this additional capacity would already be required for other services. Furthermore, according to Network Rail, even were it possible to create further train paths beyond this, the proposed 2 tph Wisbech–Cambridge service would be "in direct competition with other proposals for paths through Ely", suggesting that potential competitors for paths might include additional Cambridge–Norwich services extending new East West Rail services to Cambridge from Oxford; additional passenger services from the West Midlands to Cambridge, Stansted, or Norwich; and additional freight services, especially between the West Midlands and Felixstowe. Pro-rail advocacy group Railfuture has questioned whether 11 tph would be sufficient to reliably assure even the limited growth in freight traffic Network Rail says it is trying to achieve, given that a long slow freight train can need two train-path slots. Instead it suggests Network Rail should be more ambitious, arguing for a grade-separated flyover that would make trains between the West Midlands and Ipswich or Felixstowe independent of trains between Cambridge and Kings Lynn or Norwich. This it says could achieve 14 tph, with the possibility to increase this to 18 tph.

Network Rail's review of responses to its Ely capacity consultation was expected later in 2023. In the meantime Cambridgeshire and Peterborough Combined Authority have issued a new consultation, asking whether a shuttle or light-rail service between Wisbech and March should also be considered, as an alternative or interim measure.
