= Watlington, Norfolk =

Village in Norfolk, England

Coordinates: 52.67342°N 0.39309°E

Watlington
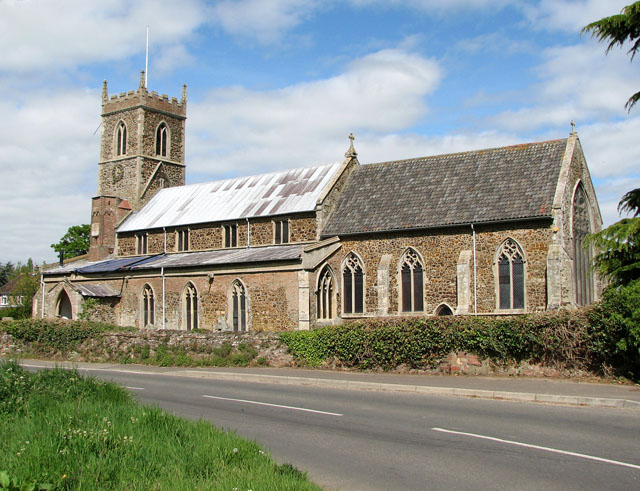
- St Peter and Paul Church, Watlington

- Location within Norfolk
- Area: 6.93 km^{2} (2.68 sq mi)
- Population: 2,455 (2011 Census)
  - Density: 354/km^{2} (920/sq mi)
- OS grid reference: TF619111
- Civil parish: Watlington
- District: King's Lynn and West Norfolk
- Shire county: Norfolk
- Region: East
- Country: England
- Sovereign state: United Kingdom
- Post town: KING'S LYNN
- Postcode district: PE33
- Dialling code: 01553
- Police: Norfolk
- Fire: Norfolk
- Ambulance: East of England

Watlington is a village, civil parish and electoral ward in the English county of Norfolk. It covers an area of 6.93 km^{2} (2.68 sq mi) and had a population of 2,031 in 852 households at the 2001 census, the population increasing to 2,455 at the 2011 Census. It is in the district of King's Lynn and West Norfolk.

The villages name means 'farm/settlement of Hwaetel's/Wacol's people' or perhaps, 'farm/settlement at Wateling (= Wattle/thatching place)'.

It is situated some 1.2 mi (1.9 km) from the east bank of the River Great Ouse, 7.5 mi (12.1 km) south of the town of King's Lynn and 37 mi (60 km) west of the city of Norwich.

The village is directly served by Watlington railway station (on the Fen Line between Cambridge and King's Lynn) which is situated 0.62 mi (1.00 km) from the centre of the village. Amenities in the village include a public house, Post Office and medical centre with pharmacy. There is also a sports and social club, village hall and church to the north east of the village.

A small nature reserve named 'Watatunga' opened to visitors in July 2020, offering guided buggy tours amongst '170 acres of woodland, grassland and lakes'. This occupies a vast area directly situated between Watlington and the nearby A10 trunk road.

== Gallery ==
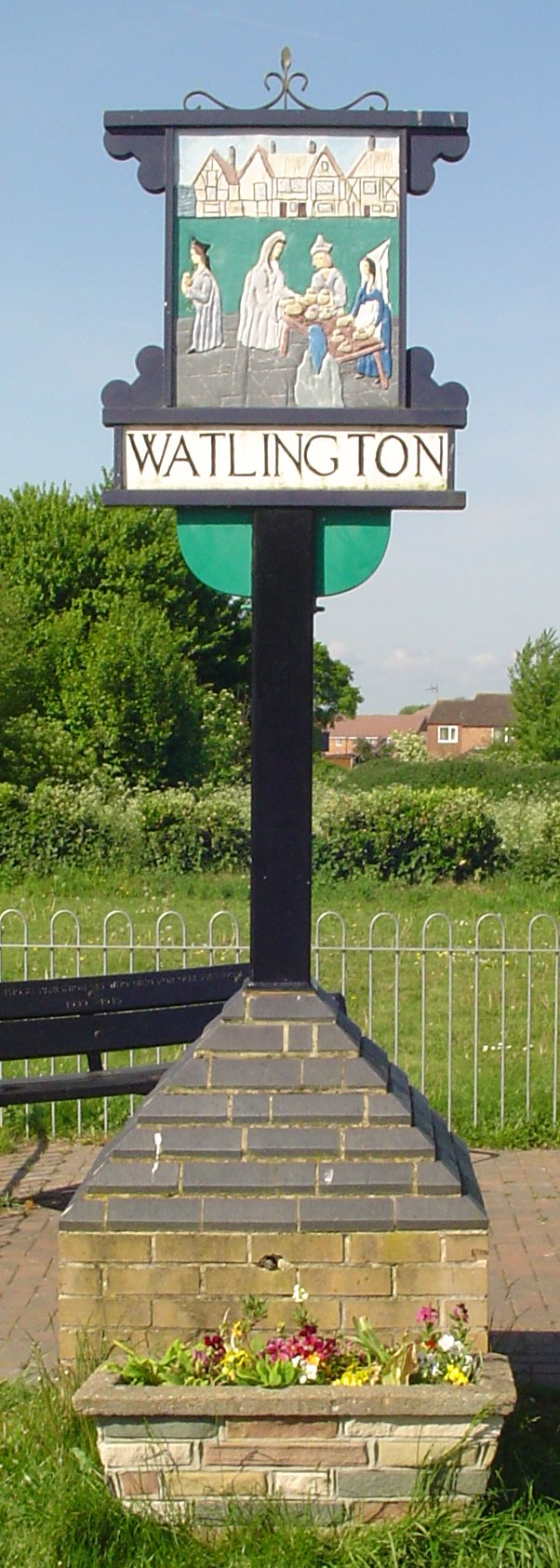
Watlington's village sign.

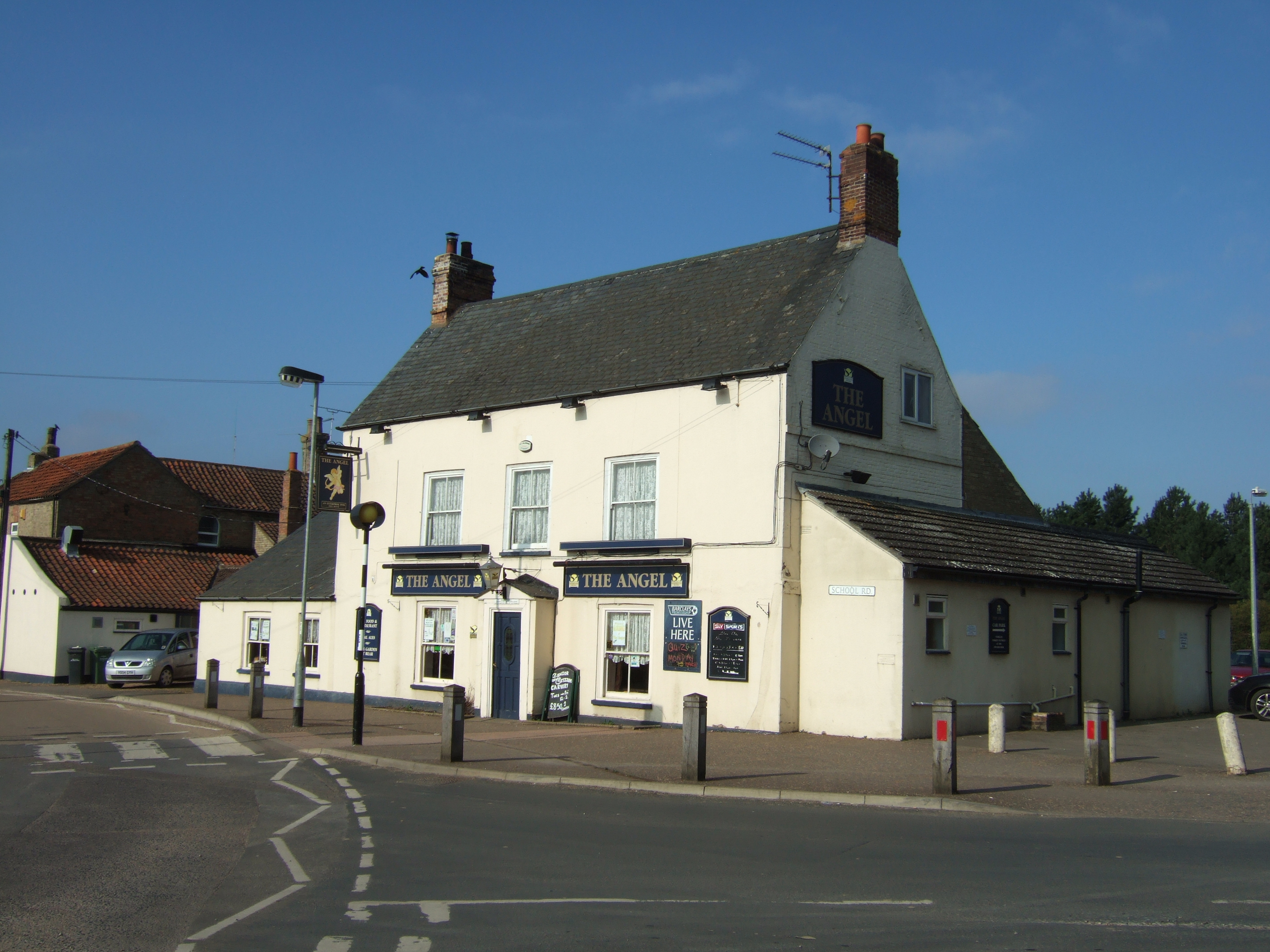
The Angel pub

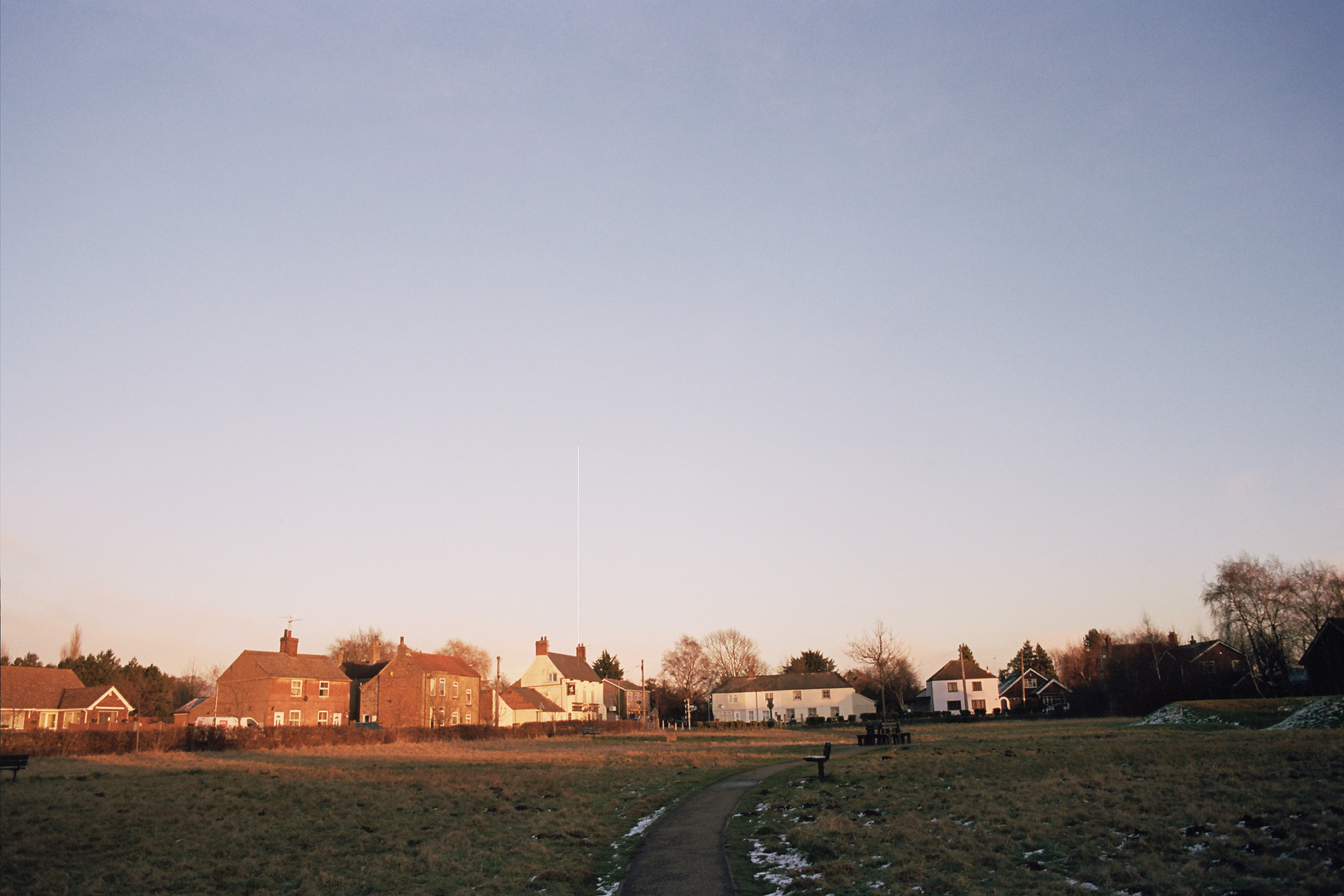
Millennium Green (also known as Angel Field)

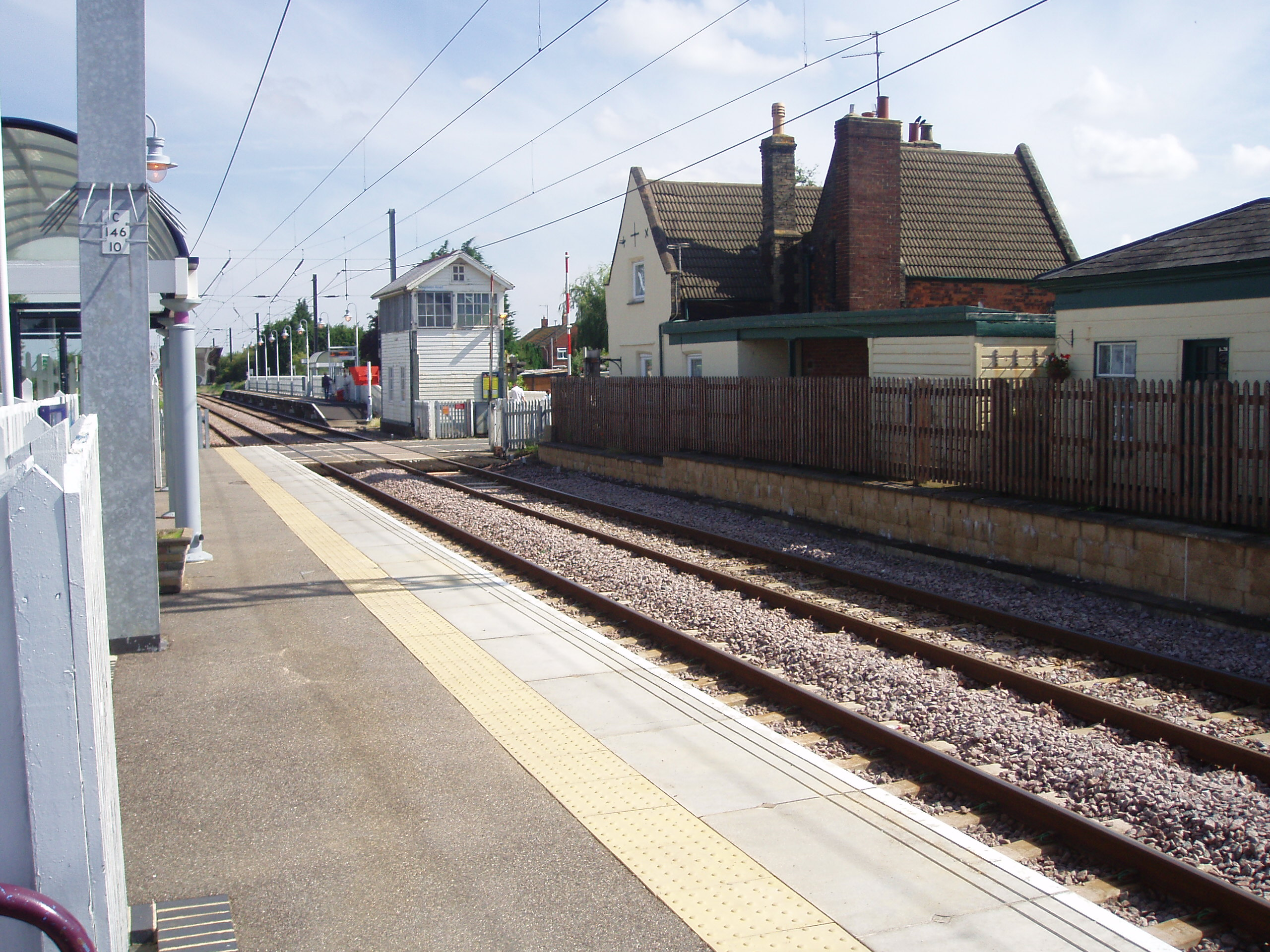
Watlington railway station in 2005.
