= Watlington railway station =

Railway station in Norfolk, England

Coordinates: 52.67273°N 0.38270°E

Watlington
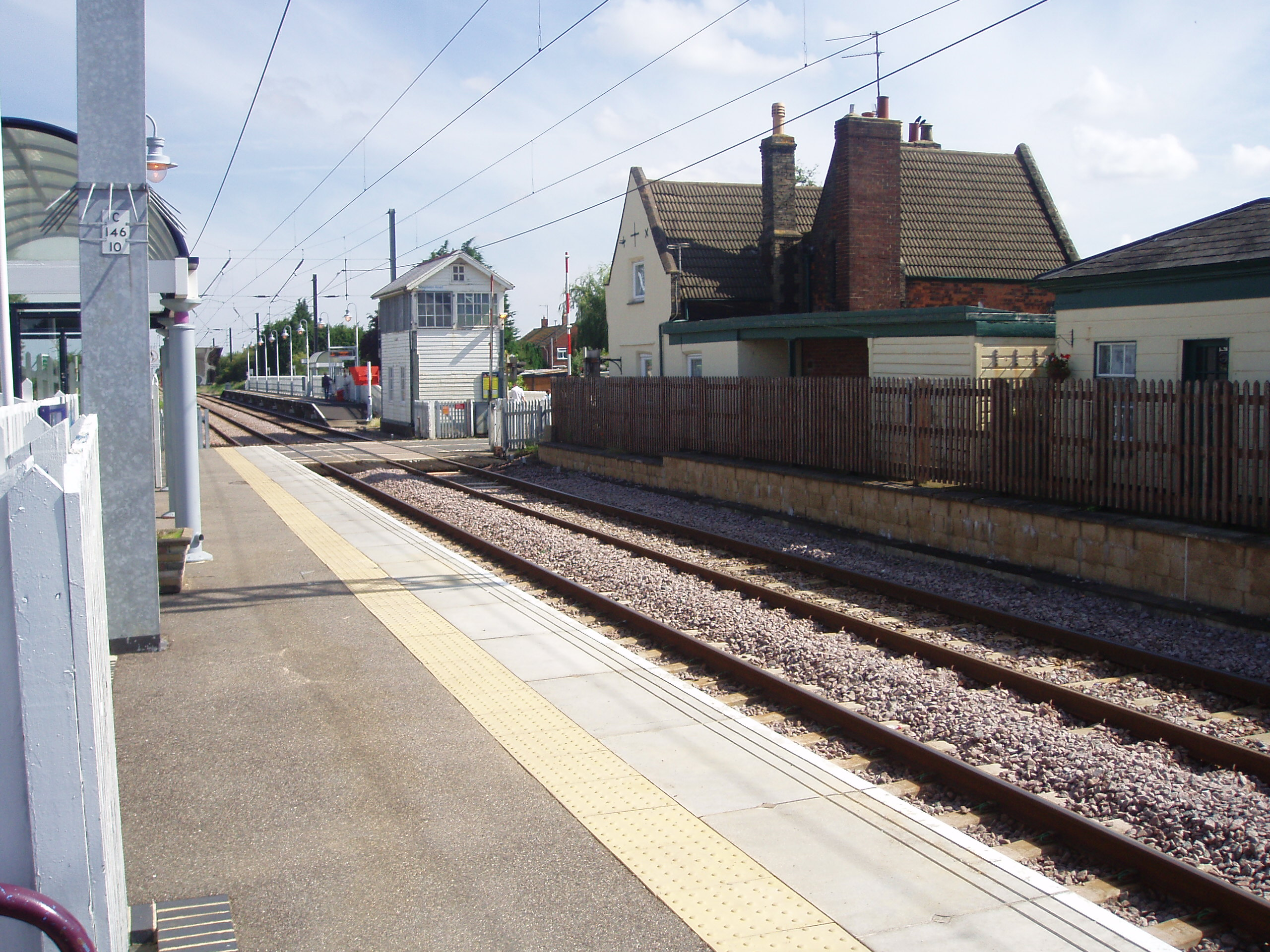
- Watlington railway station in 2005

General information
- Location: Watlington, King's Lynn and West Norfolk; England
- Grid reference: TF612110
- Owner: Network Rail
- Manager: Great Northern
- Platforms: 2

Other information
- Station code: WTG
- Classification: DfT category E

Key dates
- 27 October 1846: Opened as Watlington
- 1 June 1875: Renamed Magdalen Road
- 9 September 1968: Closed
- 5 May 1975: Reopened
- 3 October 1989: Renamed Watlington

Passengers
- 2020–21: ▼39,078
- 2021–22: ▲0.106 million
- 2022–23: ▲0.108 million
- 2023–24: ▲0.119 million
- 2024–25: ▲0.134 million
Location
Notes
- Passenger statistics from the Office of Rail and Road

Watlington railway station (formerly known as Magdalen Road) is on the Fen line in the east of England, serving the village of Watlington, Norfolk. It is 90 miles 70 chains (146.2 km) measured from London Liverpool Street and is situated between Downham Market and King's Lynn stations. The station and all trains calling are operated by Great Northern.

== History ==
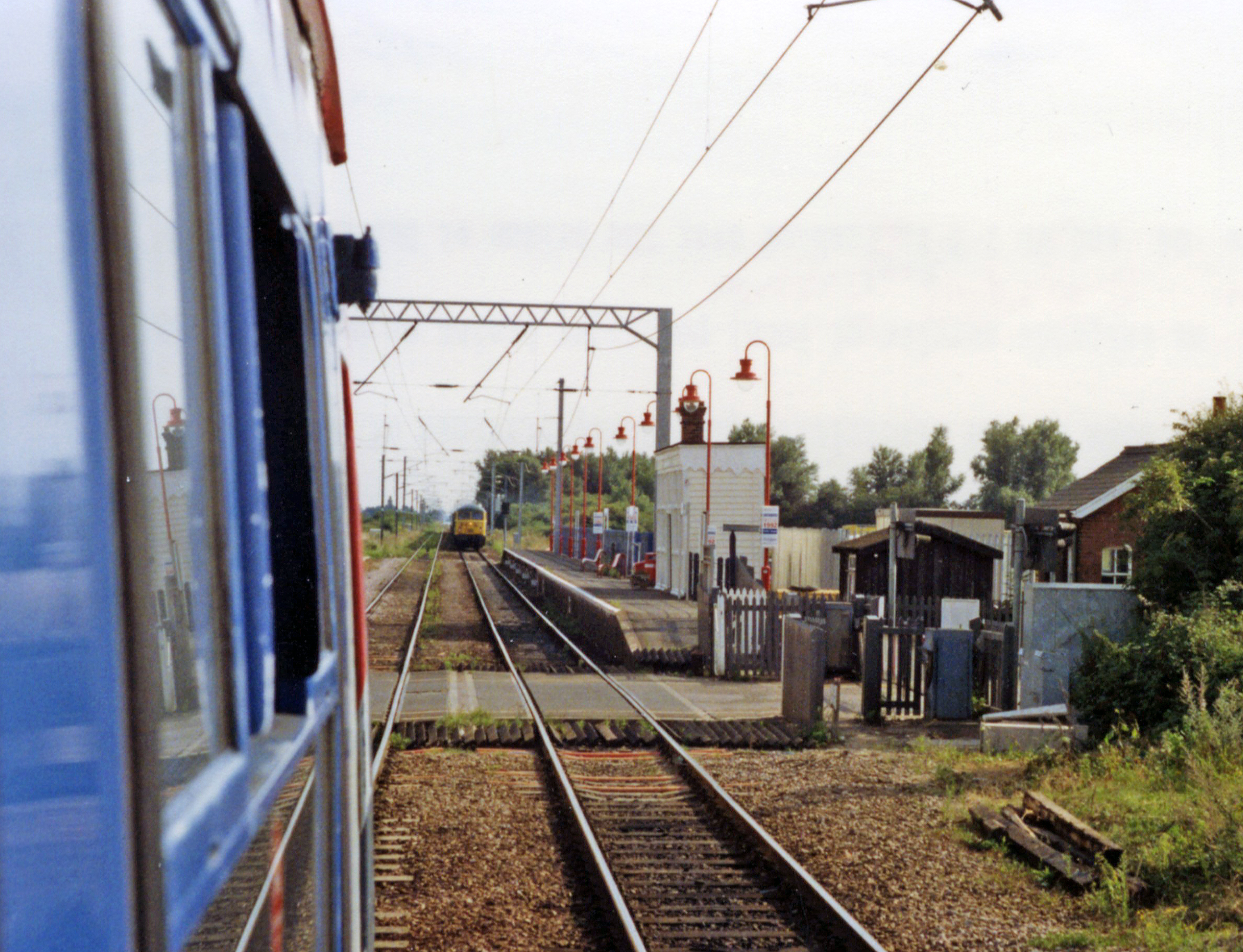
The King's Lynn-bound platform seen from a southbound train in 1992

The Bill for the Lynn and Ely Railway received Royal Assent on 30 June 1845. Work started on the line in 1846 and the line and its stations were opened on 27 October 1846. Watlington station opened with the line and was, as it is now, situated South of Lynn station (now King's Lynn). The line ran from Ely to Downham, the eventual destination being Ely.

Watlington station, from 1847 part of the East Anglian Railway, became part of the Great Eastern Railway in 1862, and was renamed Magdalen Road from 1 June 1875 (a name which, perhaps, better reflects its lonely rural location in the middle of the flatlands of the East Anglian Fens). From 1848 onwards, Watlington was a junction, as a line once branched off from there to Wisbech. The branch, along with Magdalen Road station, was closed in 1968.

Due to local efforts, however, Magdalen Road station was reopened in 1975, and in 1989 returned to its original title of Watlington. KL Magazine records the efforts of local residents to prepare for the reopening:

However, the dedicated pressure group were determined, and made it their mission to raise the money and restore their station to its former glory. Kate and Joyce busied themselves with fundraising activities, organising two dances and three tombolas and gathering donations with the help of their neighbour Johnny Lemon.

Parties of villagers cleared brambles from the platforms, cut back bushes, and repainted the waiting room.

Their labours were assisted by a strong sense of community (and beer provided by Dr Lacey) and the experience brought the whole village closer together. All the hard work proved to be worth it when, in November 1974, British Rail announced to delighted locals that the station would reopen the following spring.

‘’It really was a village effort,’’ Kate remembers. ‘‘It took a lot of perseverance, but together we made it happen.’’

As of 2025, the signalbox still carries the former name of Magdalen Road. The former station house is now a private residence.

== Facilities ==
The station only has basic facilities, including shelters, ticket machines, departure screens, a car park and cycle spaces. Both platforms have step-free access.

== Passenger volume ==
Passenger volume at Watlington
	2004–05	2005–06	2006–07	2007–08	2008–09	2009–10	2010–11	2011–12	2012–13	2013–14	2014–15	2015–16	2016–17	2017–18	2018–19	2019–20	2020–21	2021–22	2022–23	2023–24	2024–25
Entries and exits	85,231	85,423	91,250	100,665	111,612	107,956	113,898	129,146	137,874	131,742	143,904	148,928	144,114	146,008	153,782	138,366	39,078	105,886	107,724	118,846	133,888

The statistics cover twelve month periods that start in April.

== Services ==
Outside peak hours, trains run hourly to King's Lynn and London King's Cross. There are extra peak services increasing the service to twice per hour.

Greater Anglia no longer run services as of the May 2023 timetable change.

Preceding station	National Rail	Following station
Downham Market	Great Northern Fen Line	King's Lynn
Historical railways
Holme Line open, station closed	Great Eastern Railway Fen Line	St Germain's Line open, station closed
Disused railways
Magdalen Gate Line and station closed	British Rail Eastern Region Wisbech Line	King's Lynn Line and station open

== Bibliography ==
- Adderson, Richard; Kenworthy, Graham (2002). Mitchell, Vic (ed.). Ely to King's Lynn, including the Stoke Ferry branch. Middleton Press. ISBN 1-901706-53-2.
- Oppitz, Leslie (2002). Lost Railways of East Anglia. Countryside Books. ISBN 1-85306-595-1.
- Quick, Michael (2023) [2001]. Railway passenger stations in Great Britain: a chronology (PDF). version 5.05. Railway & Canal Historical Society.
