= Benwick =

Village in Cambridgeshire, England

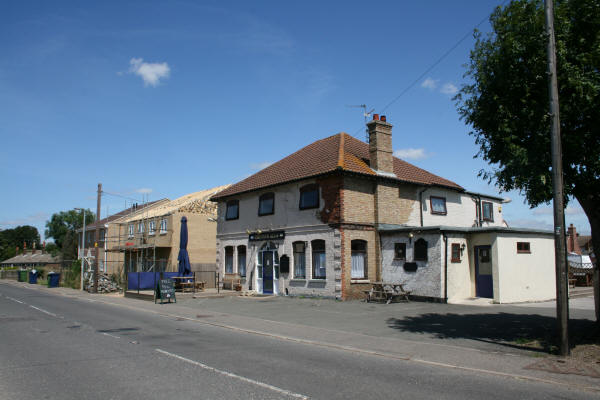

- Location within Cambridgeshire
- Population: 1,137 (2011 Census)
- OS grid reference: TL341909
- Civil parish: Benwick
- District: Fenland
- Shire county: Cambridgeshire
- Region: East
- Country: England
- Sovereign state: United Kingdom
- Post town: March
- Postcode district: PE15
- Dialling code: 01354
- Police: Cambridgeshire
- Fire: Cambridgeshire
- Ambulance: East of England

Benwick is a village and civil parish in the Fenland district of Cambridgeshire, England in the historic Isle of Ely. It is approximately 15 miles (24 km) from Peterborough and 30 miles (48 km) from Cambridge. The population of Benwick was recorded as 1137 in the United Kingdom Census 2011 with 452 households. The River Nene (Old Course) (part of the Middle Level Navigations) passes through the village, which is thus accessible by boat from the inland waterways network in England.

== History ==
The settlement's name is derived from the Old English bean or beam, and wic, meaning "farm where beans are grown" or "farm by a tree-trunk." Benwick's High Street is built on a roddon; the silt banks of the old West Water river.

The earliest records of village refer to a garrison built in Benwick by Geoffrey de Mandeville in 1143. In 1221, Benwick had 15 tenants and by 1251, 32. It used to be in the parish of Doddington, one of the largest parishes in England. Under the Doddington Rectory Division (Amendment) Act 1856 (19 & 20 Vict. c. 1 Pr.) it was divided into seven rectories.

H. C. Darby, in his Drainage of the Fens, records that in 1611 a scholar from the continent, toured the Isle of Ely, noting that the houses in Benwick were all surrounded by water, like islands, and the inhabitants were occupied with fishing and fowling. In 1774 the Earl of Orford remarked of Benwick that "the number of children crossing near a cottage and a school added much to the scene, in appearance much like the best Flemish Landscapes".

In 1737, it was reported:

'From March in the Isle of Ely we hear of a most audacious and uncommon Outrage committed on the 6th inst. at Berwick, a small Village between March and Whittlesey, by a numerous Body of Irishmen, who having swarm'd in those Parts for Harvest-Work, upon a Quarrel with the Inhabitants they ravag'd and plunder'd the whole Town and the next Day they attempted the like at March (and) might probably have succeeded, had not Numbers from Whittlesey came opportunely to the Succour of the March-Men but after a sharp Engagement, wherein several were wounded on both Sides, the Irishmen were put to the Route, leaving behind them only five of their Companions, who were taken Prisoners and committed to Wisbech Goal'.

In 1864 the village lock-up was demolished and sold.

From 1898 to 1966 Benwick was the terminus of the Benwick goods railway which ran from Three Horseshoes junction at Turves, on the Ely to Peterborough line. The station was on the road to Whittlesey. There was never a passenger service on the line, except a special enthusiasts train on 9 September 1956.

In her memoirs, Florence Sismey, who lived in Benwick from 1906, described the effects of the First World War on local agriculture. Farm horses were requisitioned for military service, whilst women and girls undertook work including harvesting corn, and picking potatoes. At Keyworth Farm, flax was grown for the war effort, and a Titan tractor was introduced to help compensate for the shortages of horses and labour. She also recalled that empty goods wagons were regularly stored on the Benwick rail branch at weekends to free space on the main line, temporarily preventing local farms from dispatching their produce until the branch was cleared.

Sismey also described a chapel-based initiative to send parcels to men from the village serving in the armed forces. Organisers collected contributions and addresses for around 70 servicemen, sending knitted socks and gloves, cigarettes, chocolate, stationery, and other supplies. Extracts from letters of thanks were subsequently read at a packed meeting in the chapel, prompting a collection for further parcels.

Benwick's first village hall was a former army hut, opened by Lord de Ramsey. The village Women's Institute arrange refreshments for the opening ceremony. The hall was removed in 1939 to make way for a new road connection Doddington Road with Whittlesey Road via a bridge over the River Nene.

Benwick Bygones, a book on the History of Benwick was published in 2008 by Adam Keppel-Garner and Janet Fountain.

=== 1989 A-10 Thunderbolt crash ===
On 17 April 1989, one mile south of the village, towards Ramsey Forty Foot, returning from RAF Donna Nook to RAF Bentwaters, an Fairchild Republic A-10 Thunderbolt II of the 510th Tactical Fighter Squadron crashed.

29 year old Captain Donald Roberts was killed; he was married with two children.

== Governance ==
There are three tiers of local government covering Benwick, at parish, district and county level: Benwick Parish Council, Fenland District Council and Cambridgeshire County Council. The parish council meets at the village hall on High Street.

Benwick is part of the parliamentary constituency of North East Cambridgeshire; the current Member of Parliament is Steve Barclay.

== Religion ==
Records exist of an early chapel to St James, where an indulgence for repairs was granted in 1518, whilst the earliest recorded church was built around 1637 but unconsecrated.

The Parish Church of St Mary's was started in 1850 and opened in 1854. Designed by Samuel Sanders Teulon, it was built on the site of the earlier unconsecrated church. St Mary's was built of Norfolk carr stone with Caen stone facings, costing £2,500 to build. The tower contained two bells and a clock was added in 1871. In 1966 the tower was removed and the clock loaned to March Museum. Over time the church moved more and was condemned. The last service was held in 1980 and in 1985 the church was demolished. The font and doorway from the parish church are now at St Jude's, Westwood, Peterborough.

A Wesleyan Methodist Chapel was built in 1833; a plain square building to seat 150. An organ was installed in 1923. The chapel fell into disuse in 2006 and was subsequently sold and demolished.

A Baptist chapel was first built in 1818 on land endowed from Gideon Gascoigne; at first just a preaching place as the church was not formed until 1858. The chapel was whitewashed and thatched but in 1873 was recorded as being in a dilapidated state. A new chapel opened in 1874. The chapel was demolished in 1963.

After years of fundraising, in 2012 a church room was built as an extension to the village hall.

== Demography ==
At the time of the 2011 census, Benwick parish had 1137 inhabitants – 548 males and 589 females, living in 452 households.

== Education ==
Benwick Primary School, on High Street, is a community school for children aged four to eleven. The school opened in 1873.

Most pupils transfer to Cromwell Community College in Chatteris for secondary education. Other destinations include Abbey College in Ramsey, Neale-Wade Academy in March, and Sir Harry Smith Community College in Whittlesey.

== Landmarks ==
=== Listed buildings in Benwick ===
Name and location	Photograph	Date	Notes	Grade
War Memorial; 52.493662°N 0.024146°W		1921	The War Memorial is constructed of white stone and consists of a Latin cross on a two stepped base set on a two tier plinth: the lower tier of the plinth is a square block with a chamfered upper edge, the upper tier tall and square sectioned. There are contrasting bronze plaques attached to the west, north and south faces of the upper tier: these contain, in black lettering, the names of the 44 men who died in the First World War.	II

== Notable Residents ==
- Sir Ernest Shepperson (1874 - 1949), Conservative MP for Leominster from 1922 to 1945, lived at Keyworth House, Benwick.
- George Hughes (1865–1945), locomotive engineer and chief mechanical engineer of the Lancashire and Yorkshire Railway and later the London, Midland and Scottish Railway, was born in Benwick.

== Bibliography ==
- Astbury, A K (1987). The Black Fens (3 ed.). Wardy Hill, Ely, Cambridgeshire: Providence Press. ISBN 0-903803-18-6.
- Fountain, J and Keppel-Garner, A (2008). Benwick Bygones (1 ed.). Cambridge, Cambridgeshire: Victoire Press.
