= Whittlesey Museum =

Municipal building and museum in Whittlesey, Cambridgeshire, England

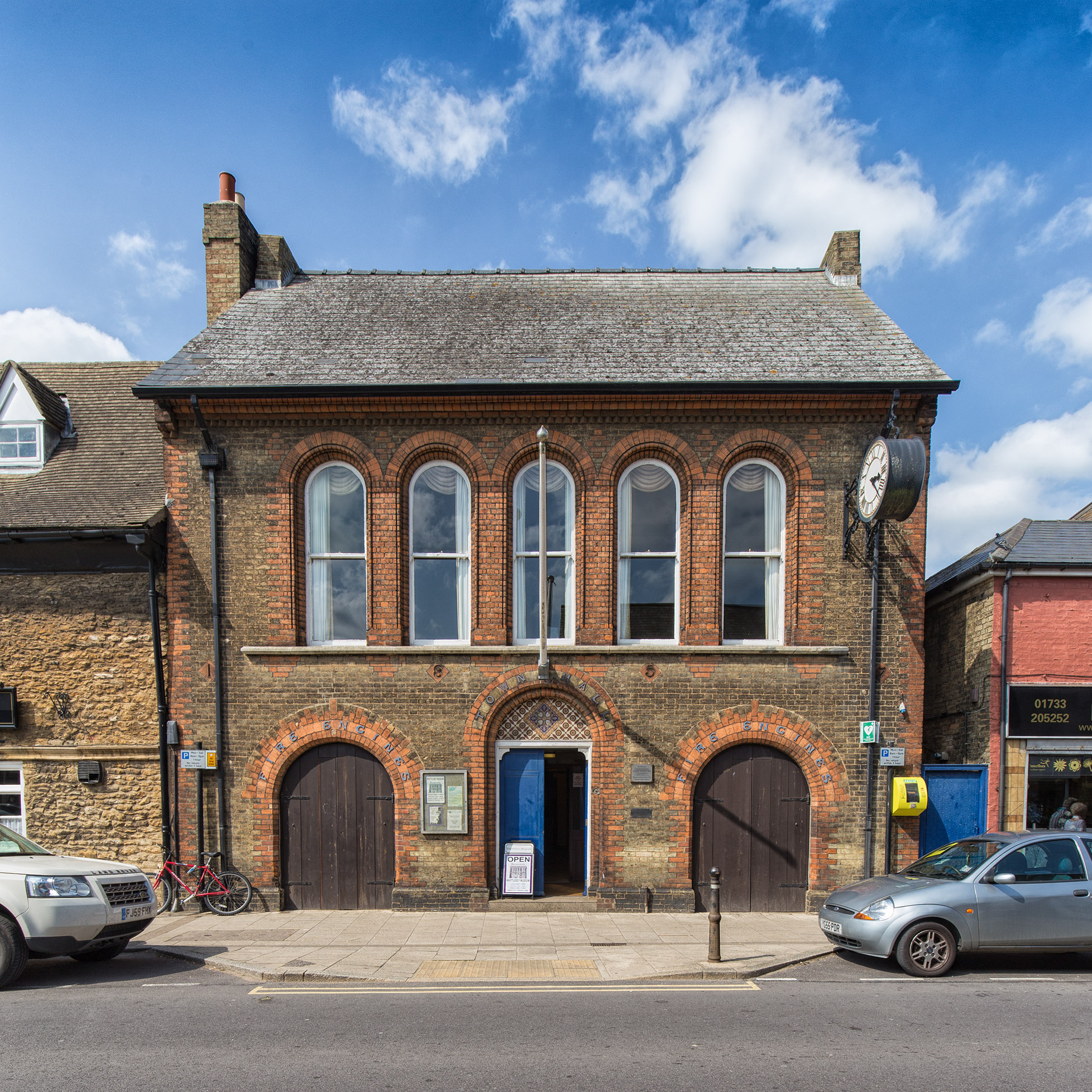
- Whittlesey Museum

- Shown in Cambridgeshire
- 52.5566°N 0.1290°W
- Location: Market Street, Whittlesey

History
- Built: 1825

Site notes
- Architect: Richard Reynolds Rowe
- Architectural style: Italianate style

Listed Building – Grade II
- Official name: Town Hall
- Designated: 22 February 1985
- Reference no.: 1228223

The Whittlesey Museum is a local history museum in Market Street, Whittlesey, Cambridgeshire, England. It is based on the ground floor of Whittlesey Town Hall, which is a Grade II listed building.

== History ==
=== The building ===
The building in its original form was completed in 1825. The design involved a symmetrical main frontage with three bays facing onto Market Street; the ground floor, which formed accommodation for the local fire service, featured a central doorway flanked by four openings for use by the horse-drawn fire engine while, on the first floor, there were an assembly room fenestrated by three large windows.

In 1857, the building was remodelled to a design by Richard Reynolds Rowe of Cambridge in the Italianate style; the work was carried out by Messrs Bennett & Sons at a cost of £257. The new design was more decorative with faience tiles in the tympanum above the doorway and an arcade of five round-headed windows on the first floor. Internally, the principal rooms were the fire station and the lock-up on the ground floor and the assembly room on the first floor. The assembly room, which was equipped with a horseshoe-shaped table, was used as a courtroom for petty sessions.

Whittlesey was governed by improvement commissioners from 1849; they were replaced by an urban district council in 1894, with the building as its headquarters. As its responsibilities increased, Whittlesey Urban District Council relocated its offices to Delph Street and then Queen Street, but continued to hold its meetings at the town hall. Following local government reorganisation in 1974, Fenland District Council became responsible for the administration of the area. A new parish council, Whittlesey Town Council, was established in 1981. It sometimes uses the town hall for its mayor-making ceremony.

=== The museum ===
The museum was founded in 1976 as an independent charitable trust with a mission and purpose of collecting, caring and interpreting the natural and cultural heritage of Whittlesey and the surrounding area (Coates, Eastrea, Pondersbridge and Turves) for the benefit and enjoyment of students, local people and visitors.

The museum gained Arts Council Accreditation close to the start of the scheme in 2007, having previously been a Registered Museum. It became a partner in the Greater Fens Partnership as one of the "Fenland Five" museums along with Wisbech & Fenland Museum, March and District Museum, the Chatteris Museum and Octavia Hill's Birthplace House.

== The collection ==
The museum collections include local archaeology and archives, costume and textiles, natural sciences, coins, medals and local social and industrial history including the Whittlesey Straw Bear. Gallery displays are mounted in the former Caretaker's Cottage and the area previously used to house the town's horse-drawn fire engine. Outside in the museum's courtyard there are displays about the local brick industry and railway whilst a forge with wheelwright's bench and agricultural machinery recalls other occupations which supported the local economy.
