= Benwick Goods Railway =

Disused railway in Cambridgeshire, England

Benwick goods railway
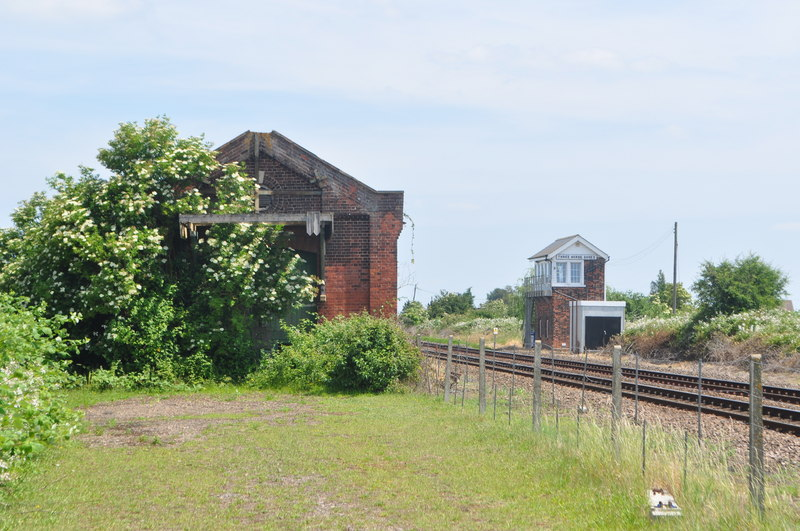
- Three Horseshoes Jn. Signal Box

Overview
- Status: Closed - track lifted
- Owner: Network Rail

Service
- System: National Rail
- Operator(s): British Rail

History
- Opened: 1898
- Closed: 1966

Technical
- Track gauge: 4 ft 8 1/2 in (1,435 mm)

The Benwick Goods Railway was a Great Eastern Railway line serving the village of Benwick, Cambridgeshire.

== History ==
The Great Eastern Railway (GER) was pro-active in helping agriculture recover after a poor first half of the 19th century and enabled Fenland farmers to get their products to market. However the area of Benwick was poorly served by road and rail, and during the 1880s, local farmers lobbied the GER board for a new railway. Initially reluctant the GER provided a siding and goods shed at Three Horseshoes (pictured). Lobbying continued and finally the GER built a single track goods only line opening to Burnt House on 1 September 1897 and Benwick on 2 August 1898.

It left the Ely to Peterborough line at Three Horseshoes Junction in Turves, Cambridgeshire, just east of the level crossing on Burnthouse Road. Passenger services were never provided, and the line closed to goods in 1966.

== Route ==
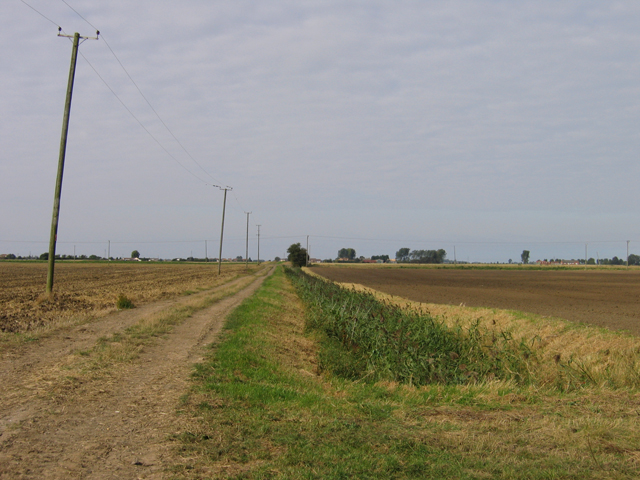
Trackbed south of the Junction

After leaving the main line at Three Horseshoes Junction, the line headed east just south of the Turves to March road. The curve of the line can be seen from the property boundaries of the houses just east of Poplars level crossing. The line then curved south towards Bottom Hake's farm. Quaker's Drove station was at the eastern end of Quaker's drove just west of the point where the metalled road ends. The next station was West Fen Drove, this was at the east end of West Fen Drove at the point where the metalled road ends.

The third station was Burnt House, this was on the road now known as Burnthouse Sidings which heads east from Burnthouse Farm. After this the line curved slightly to the west and followed what is now a byway to Jones Drove station, near Garton House where the byway makes a sharp bend.

After this, the line is difficult to trace. The next station, White Fen, was near Keyworth House Farm, and Benwick station itself was north west of the village on the road to Whittlesea.

The line terminated at Benwick and the GER provided a small wharf on the River Nene Old Course for interchange of traffic.

== Bibliography ==
There are two books which cover the Benwick line:

- The Benwick Branch by Peter Paye, ISBN 1-901190-02-1
- Benwick Bygones, a book on the village's history.
