= Fen Causeway =

Roman road in eastern England

Coordinates: 52°34′N 0°4′E

Fen Causeway or the Fen Road is the modern name for a Roman road of England that runs between Denver, Norfolk in the east and Peterborough in the west. Its path covers 24 miles (39 km), passing March and Eldernell (near Whittlesey) before joining the major Roman north–south route Ermine Street west of modern-day Peterborough. It provided a link from the north and west of England to East Anglia.

It is possible that the route continued east of Denver to meet Peddars Way at Castle Acre, but the evidence for this is less certain.

The road is thought to have been raised above the marshy fens using gravel, with a width of up to 60 feet (18 m). Towards its western end it is close to the Bronze Age route across Flag Fen. At that archaeological site, which is open to visitors, a section through the Roman Road can be seen.
