= Whittlesey Workhouse =

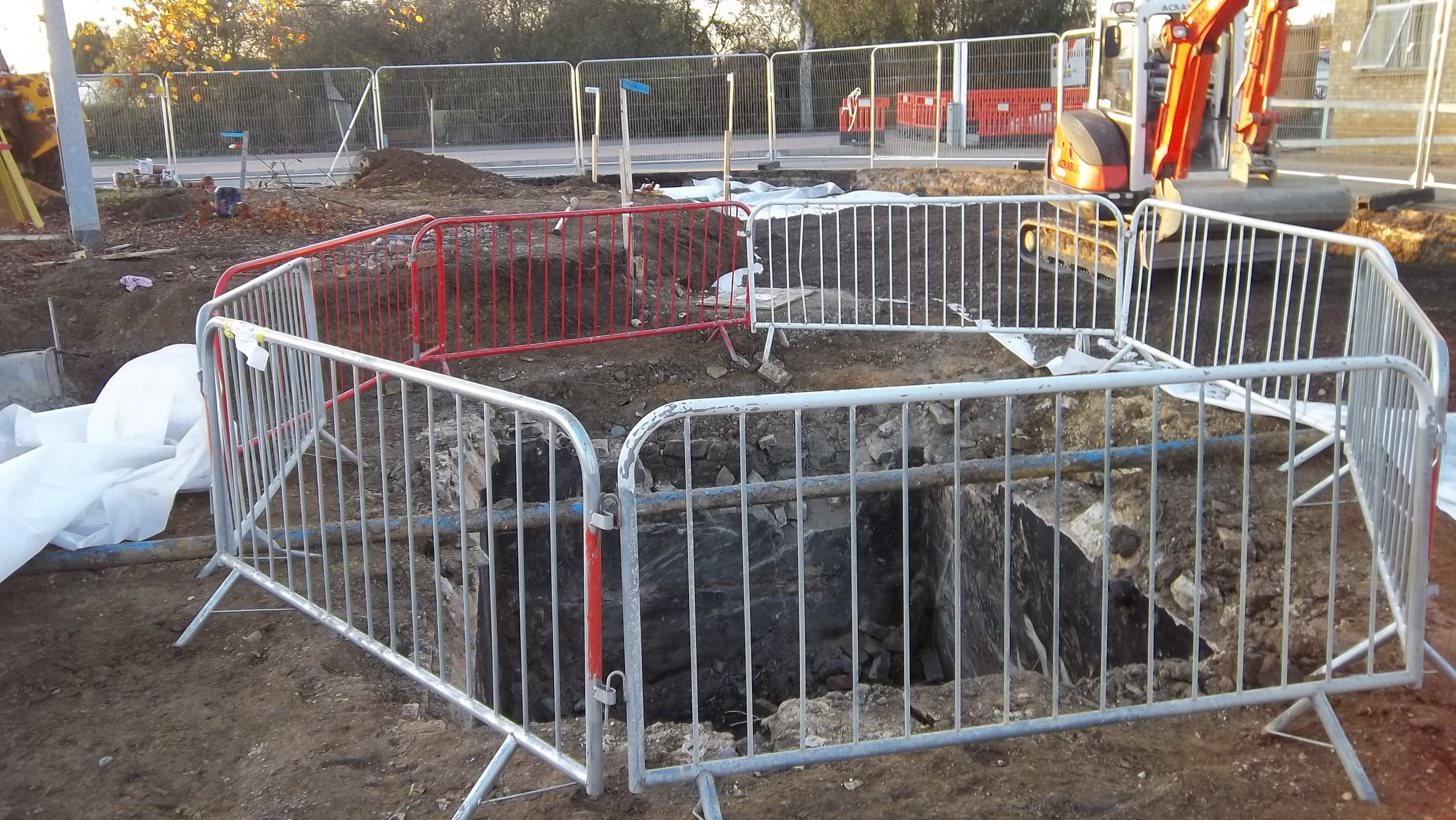
- The workhouse cellar, unearthed during renovation work at Sir Harry Smith school in 2011.
- Location: Whittlesey, Cambridgeshire
- OS grid reference: TL 27678 97337

History
- Built: 1875
- Demolished: 1938/39

Site notes
- Architect: Frederick Peck

Whittlesey Workhouse was a workhouse in the Cambridgeshire town of Whittlesey. Its use as a workhouse ceased in 1930 and it was subsequently demolished.

== History ==
The facility has its origins in a workhouse in Broad Street (formerly Old Tavern Street) built in the early 19th century. This was replaced by a new workhouse built by Frederick Peck on the north side of Eastrea Road in 1875. The new facility had a distinctive tall tower. It became the Whittlesey Poor Law Institution in the 1920s and was closed in the mid-1930s. After the workhouse had been demolished in the late 1930s, Sir Harry Smith Community College was built on the site in the early 1950s.
