= Must Farm =

Archaeological site in Cambridgeshire, England

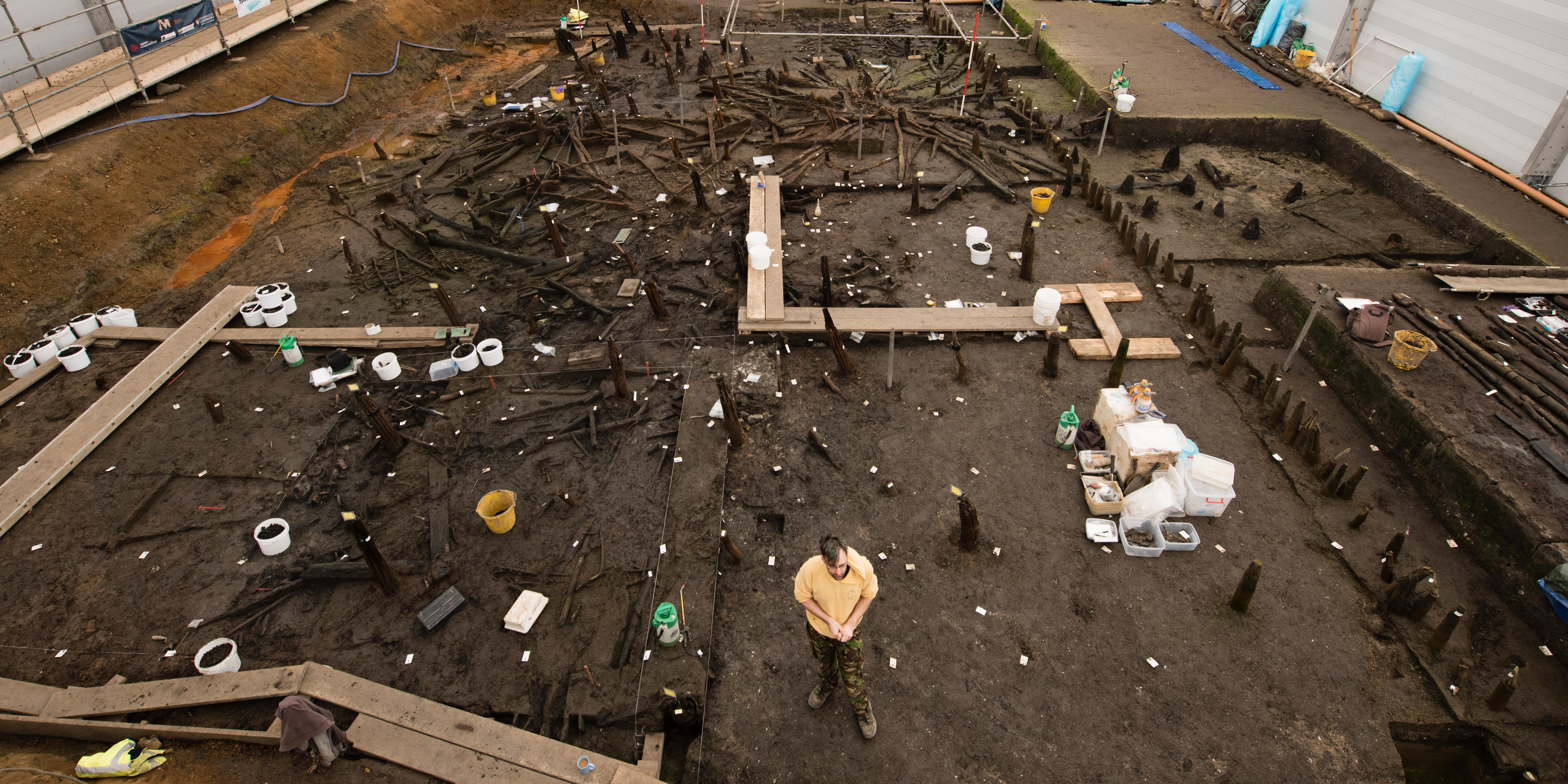
- Interactive map of Must Farm
- 52°33′18.85″N 0°10′38.35″W
- Periods: Bronze Age
- Location: Whittlesey, Cambridgeshire, England

Site notes
- Material: Wood
- Archaeologists: Cambridge Archaeological Unit
- Public access: No
- Website: www.mustfarm.com

Must Farm is a Bronze Age archaeological site consisting of five houses raised on stilts above a river built around 950 BC in Cambridgeshire, England. The settlement is exceptionally well preserved because of its sudden destruction by catastrophic fire and subsequent collapse onto oxygen-depleted river silts.

The site is on the bed of a now-defunct river in Flag Fen basin, a 46,000 km^{2} area of wetland which was formed at the last glacial maximum.

The site has been described as "Britain's Pompeii" because of its condition and was named Best Archaeological Project and Best Archaeological Discovery at the 2012 British Archaeological Awards, and Best Discovery at the 2016 Awards. An article describing the settlement won the 2020 Antiquity Prize.

== Early excavations ==
Wooden posts were first recognised at the site in 1999, leading to preliminary excavations in 2004 and 2006. Early finds at the site include a rapier and a sword in 1969. Between 2011 and 2012, eight Bronze Age log boats were discovered. The boats were found in a small freshwater palaeochannel and were preserved because of waterlogging.

Radiocarbon dating has indicated that the ages of these boats spanned a period of about 1,000 years, with the earliest examples dating to around 1750–1650 BC. Some of the boats may have been deliberately sunk. They are now preserved at Flag Fen and are available to view on guided tours.

Bronze Age woven wooden fish traps and wattle-hurdle fish weirs were found in the same channel, together with metalwork including swords and spears.

== 2015/2016 excavation ==
Simplified elevation cross-section of a typical house at Must Farm

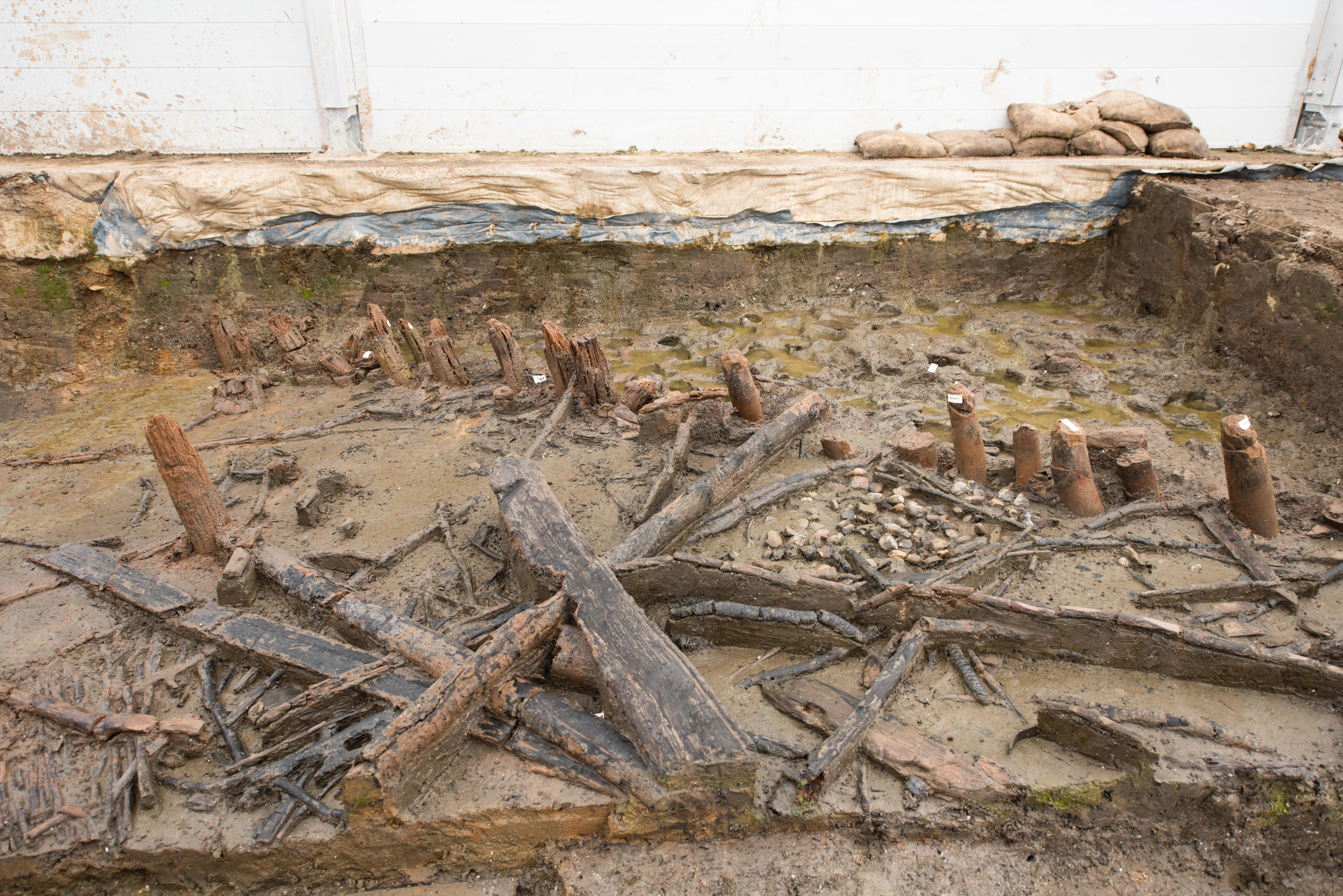

Remains of a house at Must Farm showing the unburnt stumps of posts under the waterline during the fire (top-right) and collapsed joists (bottom-left)

Simplified excavation site plan

In September 2015, the University of Cambridge's Cambridge Archaeological Unit began a dig, eventually covering 1,100 square metres (1,300 sq yd), the details of which were publicly disclosed in January 2016.

Topsoil was removed to expose the prehistoric land that was built upon. The site was excavated using GPS in order to create contour and survey maps once the dig concluded. All artefacts found were mapped with GPS and recorded using a written record.

Artefacts recovered from the site range from the Early Neolithic to the Early Bronze Age. The relation between the age of artefacts and their relative depth within the site provide information about the environment at the time of the artefacts' burial.

Historic England funded a £1.1 million project to excavate the site to gain as much knowledge of Bronze Age life in Britain as possible. Archaeologists found two roundhouses, from about 1000–800 BC, and concluded that they were damaged by fire and that the platform on which they sat then slid into the river, where the fire was extinguished and the buildings and objects within them were preserved in the silt. About half of the settlement is thought to have been lost to modern-day quarrying.

Over 400 artefacts were removed during the surface-stripping procedure including 179 pieces of worked flint, 34 shards of pottery, 149 pieces of animal bone, and 41 fragments of burnt flint. The finds were concentrated on what would have been higher ground during the occupation of the site, indicating the small difference between wet and dry ground that existed.

In 2016 a large wooden wheel of about 1 m (3.3 ft) in diameter was uncovered at the site. The specimen, dating from 1,100 to 800 years BC, represents the most complete and earliest of its type found in Britain. The wheel's hub is also present. A horse's spine found nearby suggests the wheel may have been part of a horse-drawn cart. The find "expands our understanding of late Bronze Age technology", said Duncan Wilson, chief executive of Historic England, which was co-funding the project. As of August 2016, the archaeology had been removed and the site reburied to be left sealed.

The dig was the subject of a BBC Television documentary, Britain's Pompeii: A Village Lost in Time, first broadcast on BBC Four on 2 August 2016. The excavation became known for its extensive digital outreach.

== Discovery of parasites ==
In 2019 researchers at Cambridge and Bristol universities revealed the results of a study, conducted during the 2015/2016 excavation, of human and dog coprolites found at the site. Ten samples were taken from various locations throughout the site including both upstream and downstream of the site itself. They discovered the presence of fish tapeworms, echinostoma worms, capillaria worms and giant kidney worms. The research shows the earliest evidence of human infection by these parasites in Britain. The presence of the parasites listed above and the absence of parasites common in other European Bronze Age sites highlights the importance of site ecology to parasite life.

== Use of social media ==
The Must Farm excavation team used social media extensively both during and after the dig including the creation of a Twitter page and a website. The transparency that this use of social media allowed for was praised by members of the public who appreciated the information shared.

== Gallery of finds ==
These artefacts from Must Farm were photographed at Peterborough Museum in July 2017:

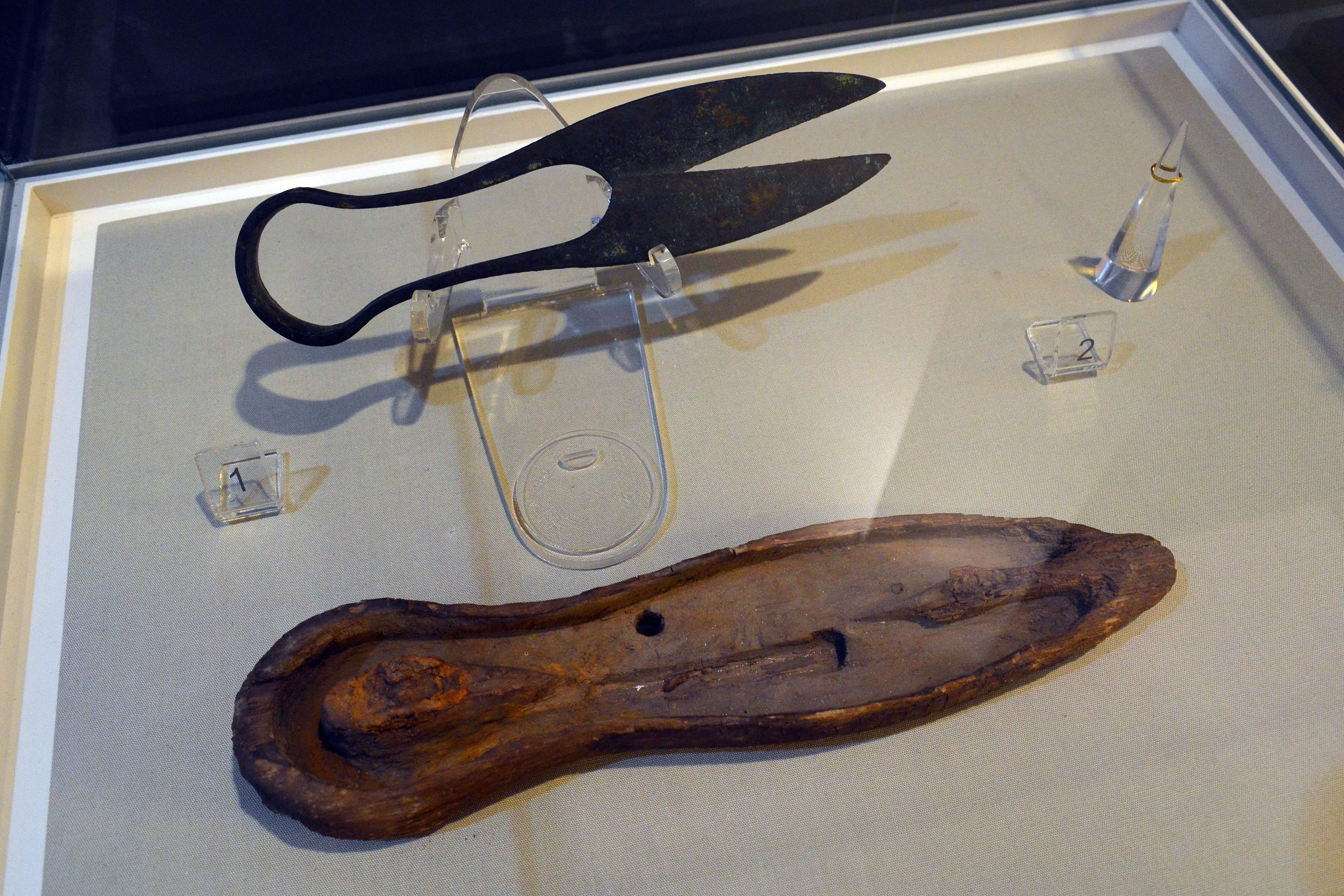
A pair of bronze shears and its wooden box, likely used for cutting textiles. The wooden case indicates that these were highly valued

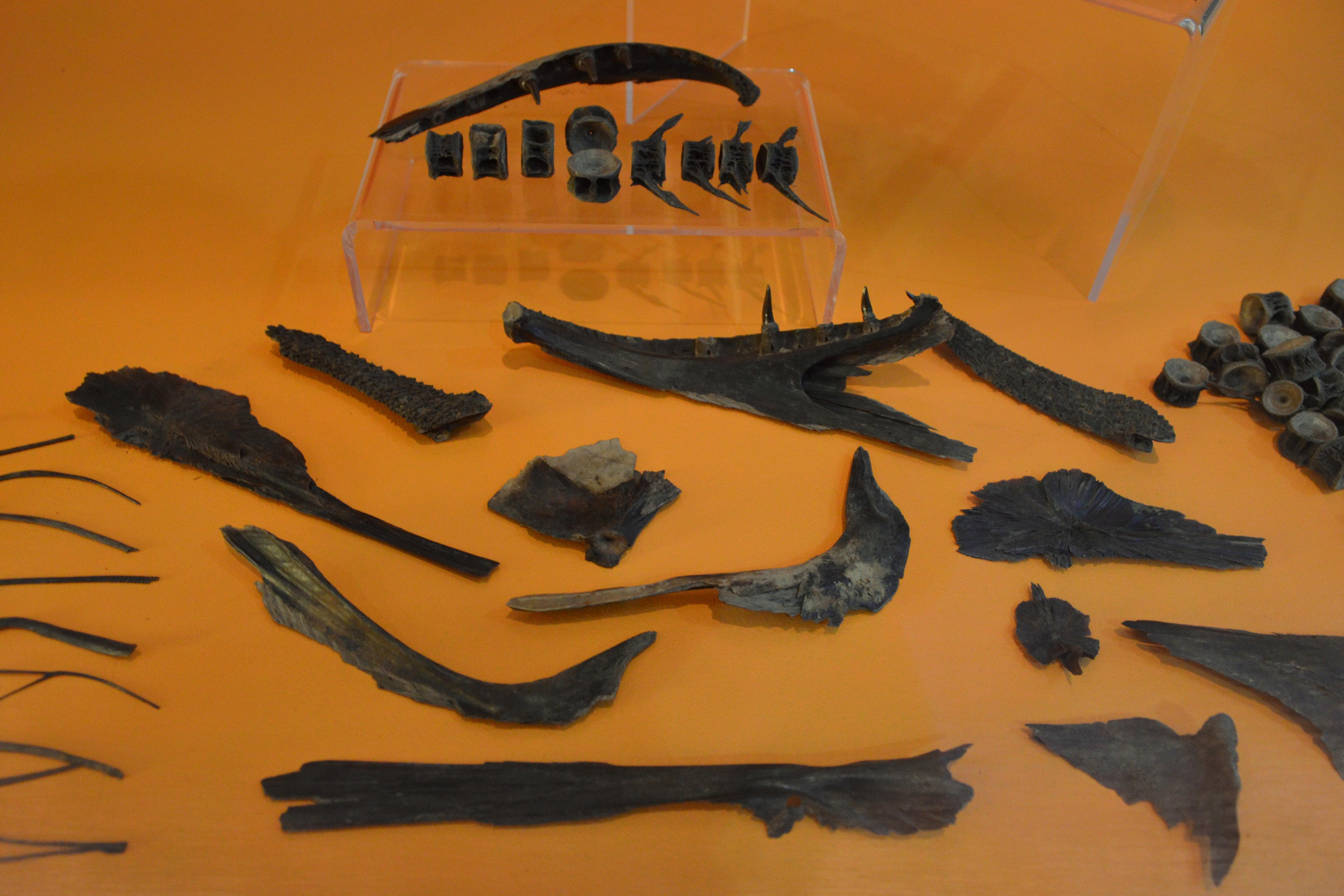
Bones and scales of pike were found outside the roundhouses, though deer and boar remains were more common at the site

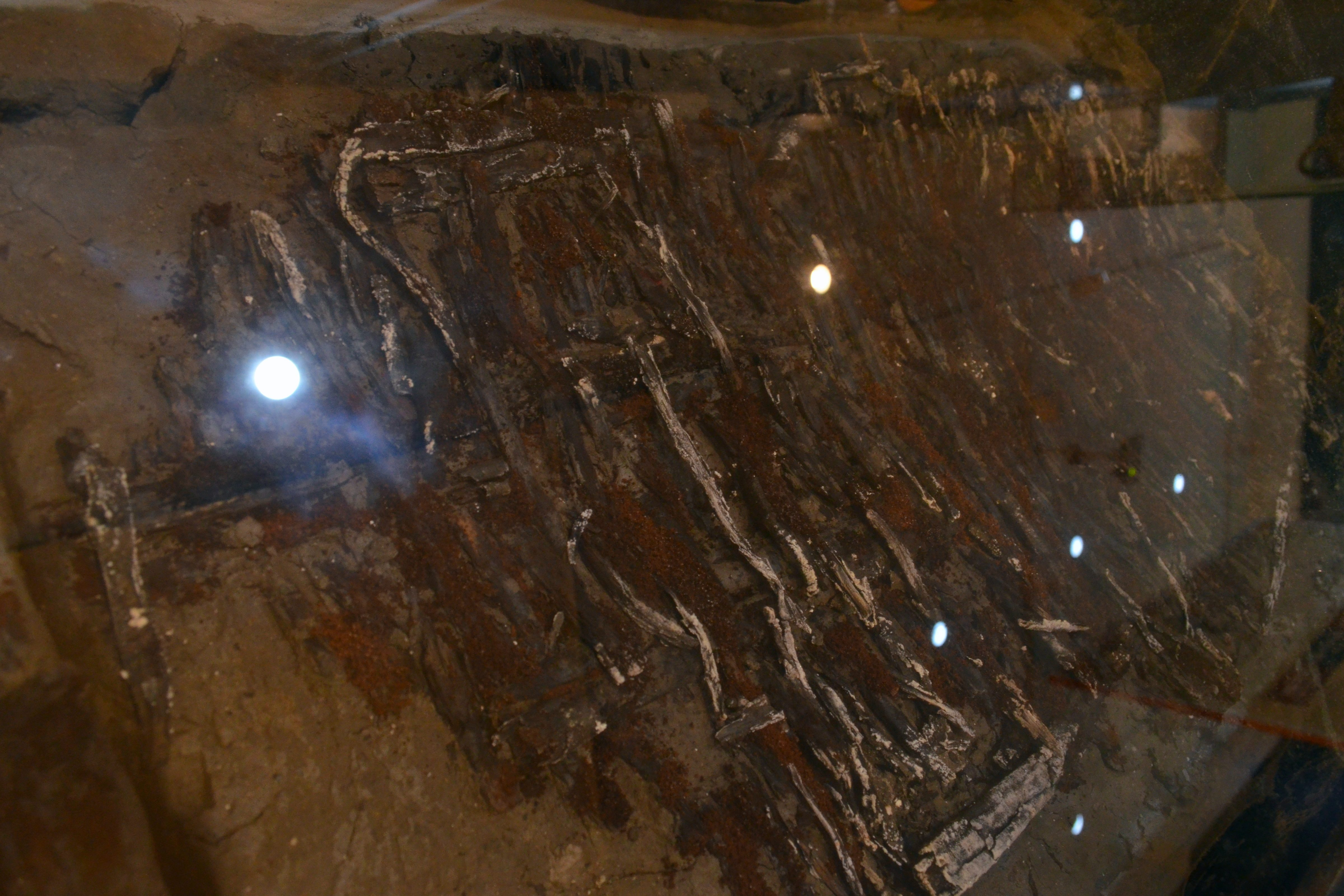
Remains of an eel trap. There were 17 more traps discovered at the site that were well preserved due to the wet silts in which they were found

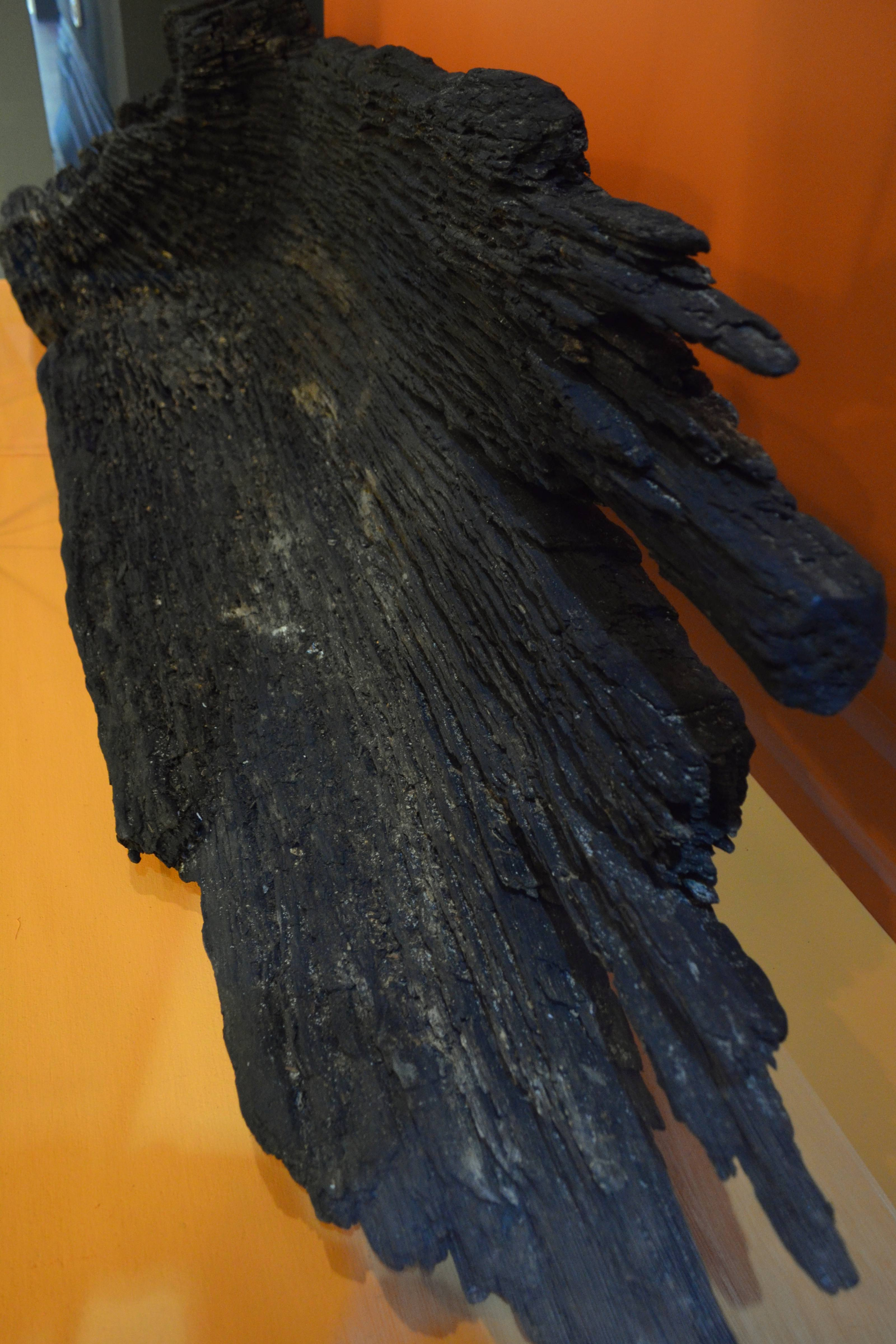
One of nine log boats found at the site, they were made from oak and maple and represent evidence of an advanced water-based society for the time

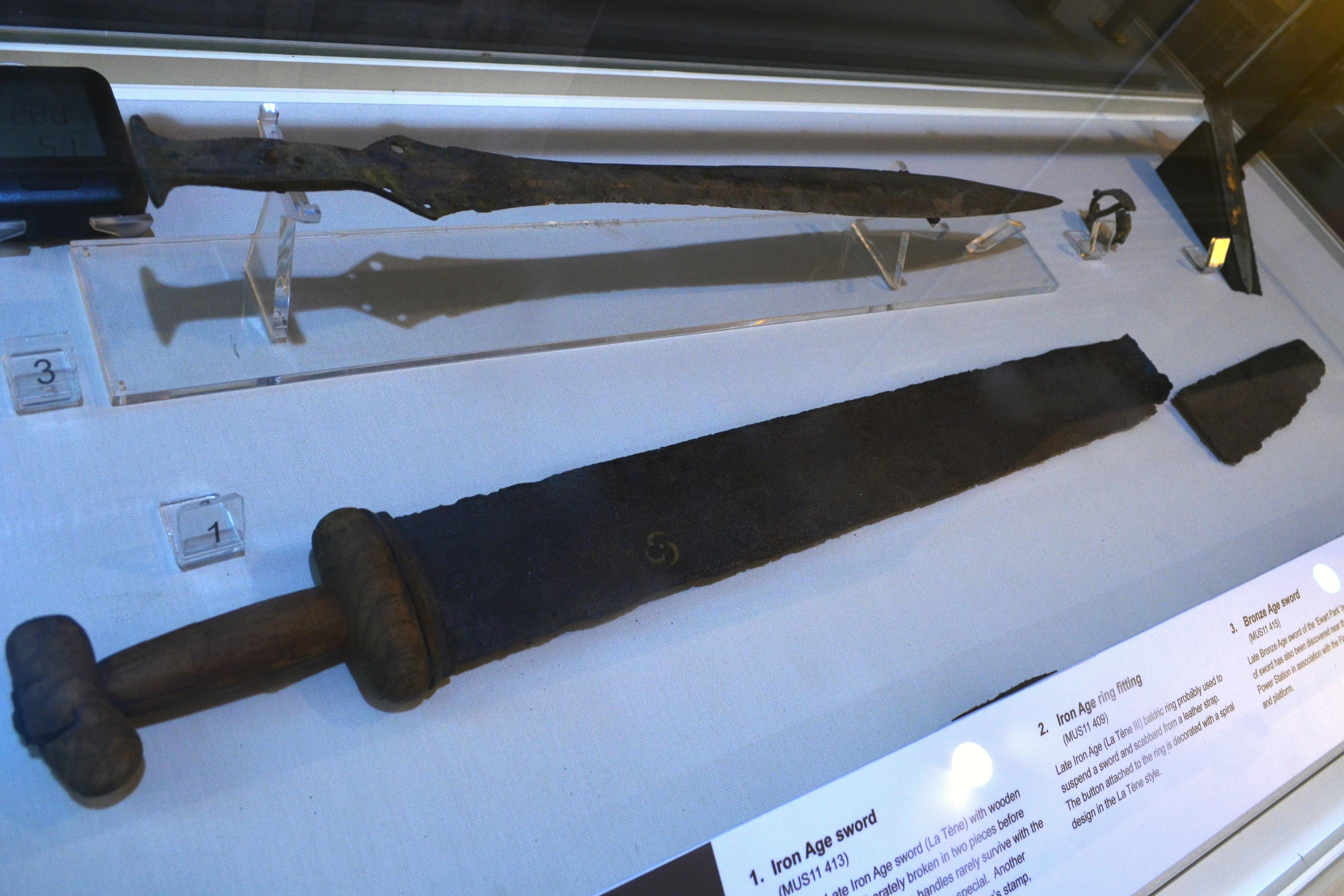
Iron and Bronze Age swords, with visible notches on the swords that indicate high use and high value

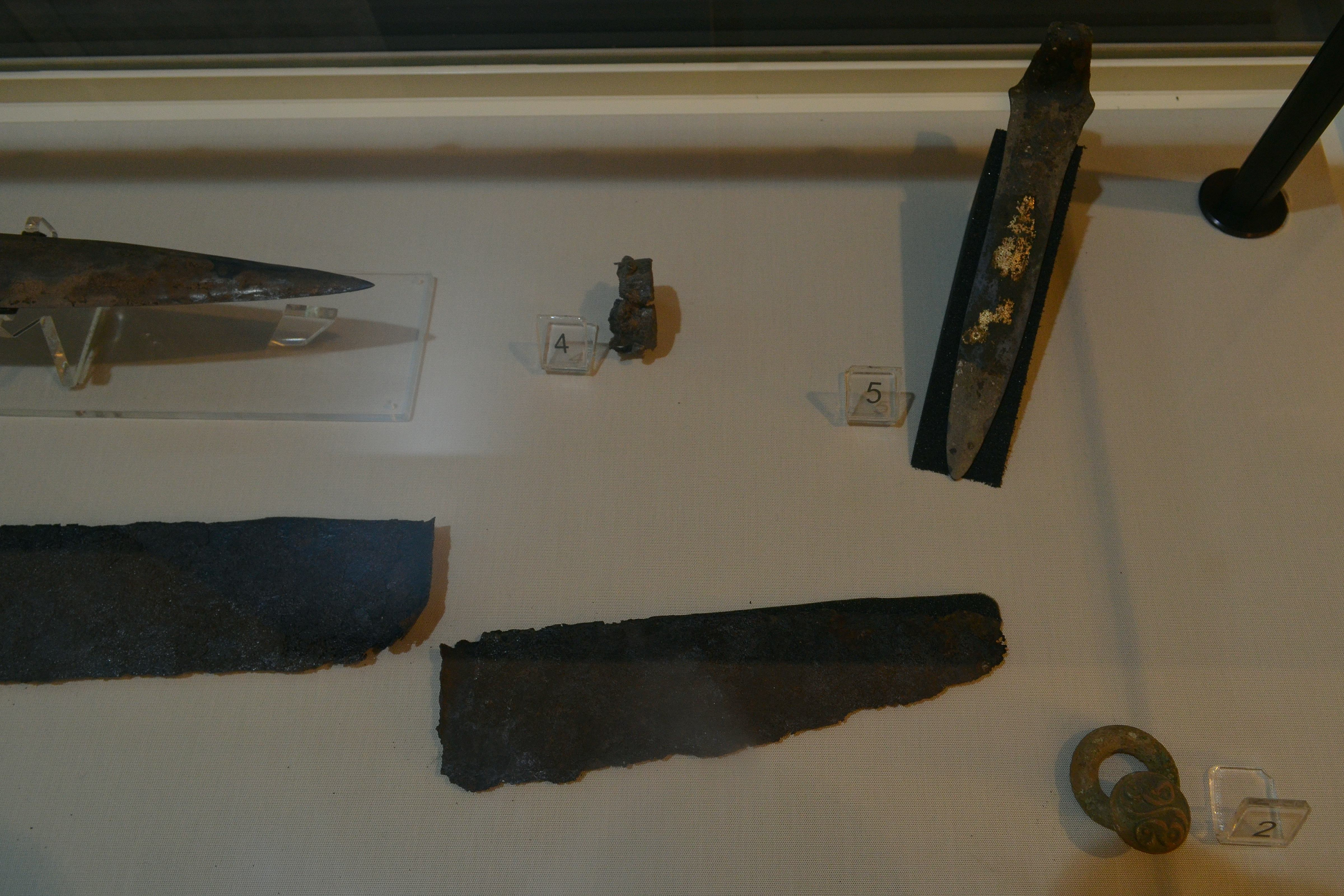
A dagger, a ring and tips of swords. The daggers were likely used for daily purposes, such as preparing food. These items give a glimpse into the routines and lives of people at the site

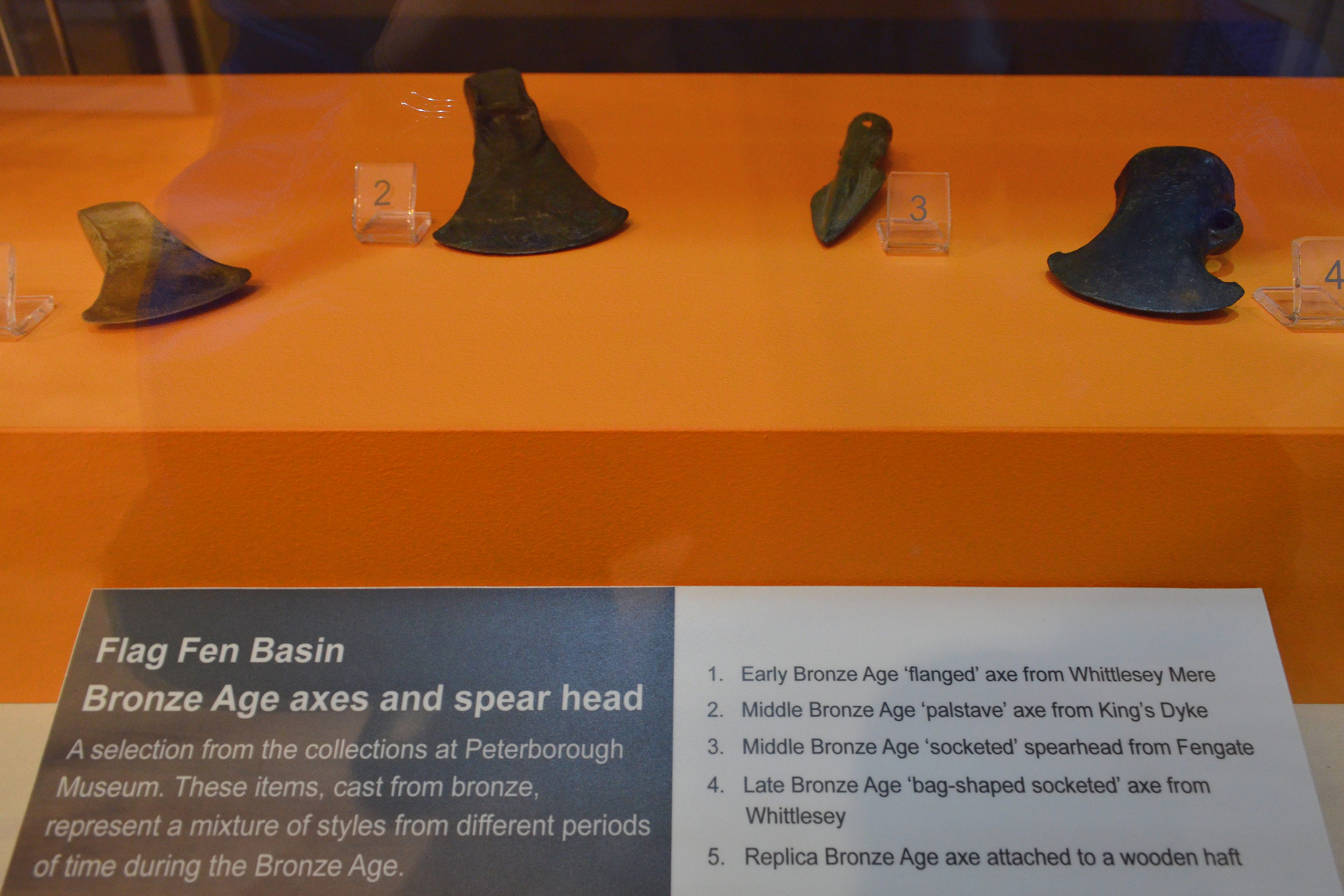
A collection of bronze axe and spear heads found within the Flag Fen basin, although none were specifically from Must Farm. Thousands of Bronze Age axe heads have been found across the UK, however the preservation at Must Farm allowed for the finding of the entire axe, including the wooden handle, which would have degraded over time otherwise

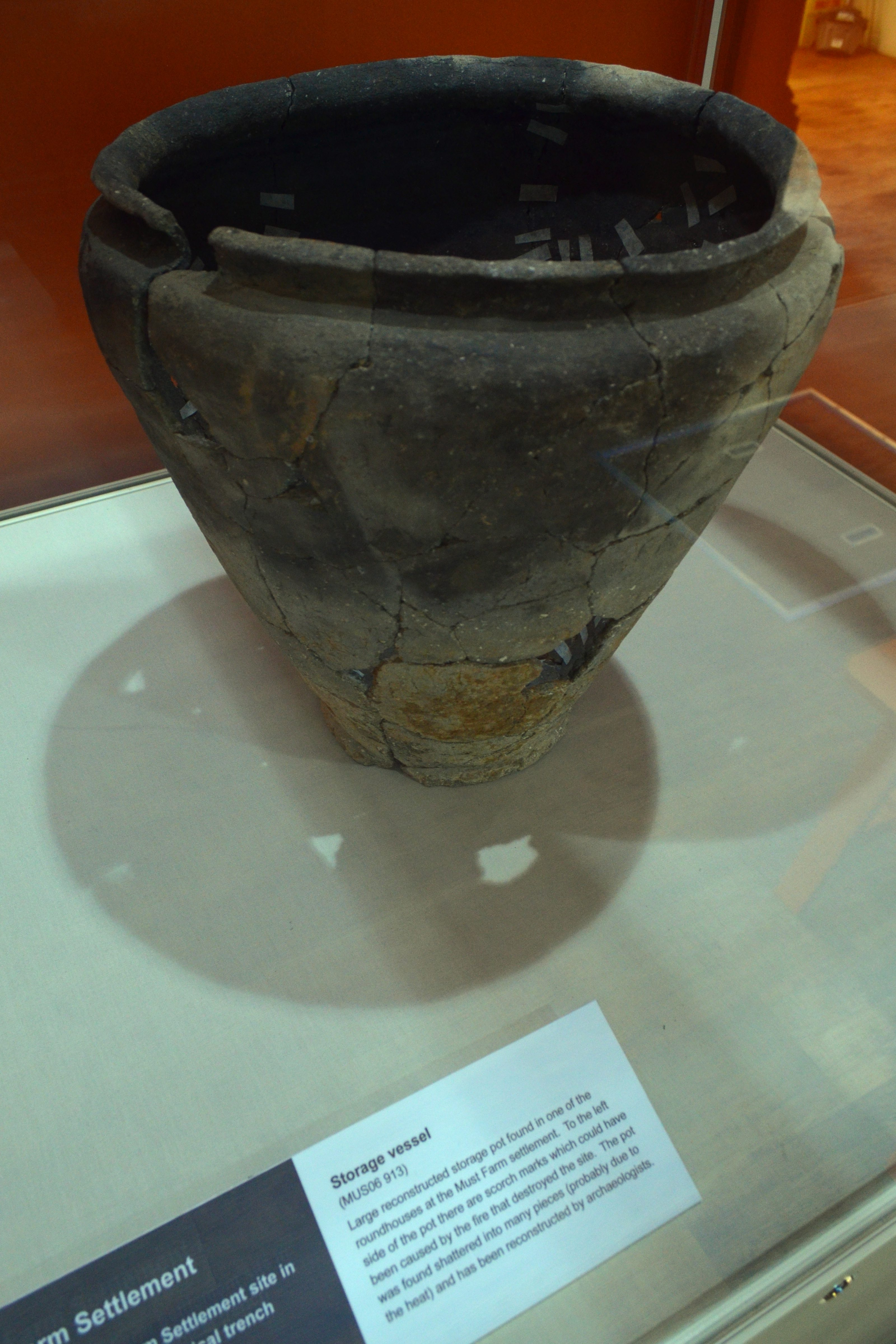
A scorched ceramic storage vessel that was found in pieces and reconstructed by archaeologists. Although this specific artefact was found broken, many ceramics at the site were found intact, with some still containing evidence of food or grain

== Bibliography ==
- Knight, M., Ballantyne, R., Brudenell, M., Cooper, A., Gibson, D., & Robinson Zeki, I. (2024). Must Farm pile-dwelling settlement: Volume 1. Landscape, architecture and occupation. McDonald Institute for Archaeological Research.
