= Sir Harry Smith Community College =

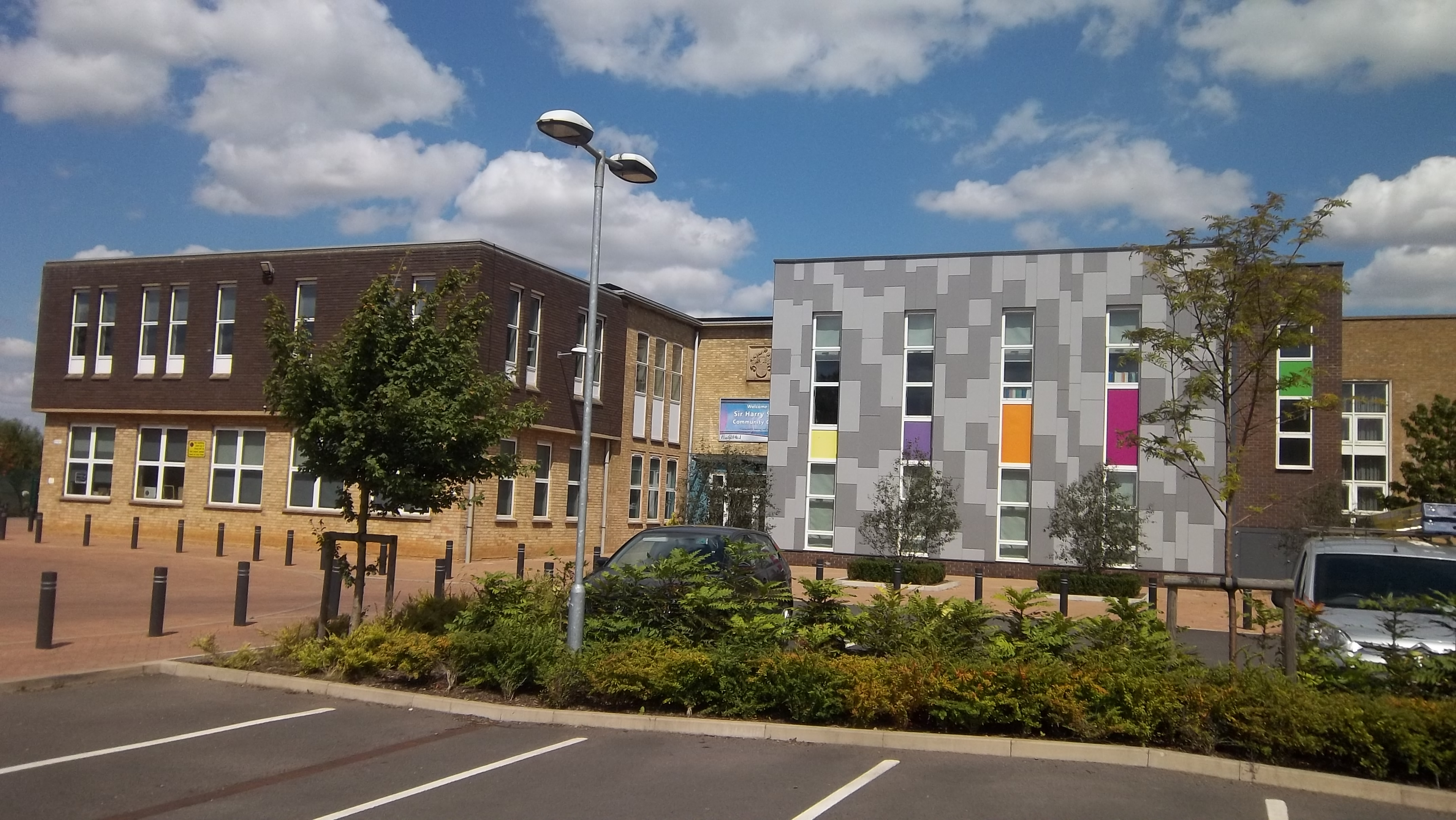

Location
- Eastrea Road; Whittlesey, Cambridgeshire, PE7 1XB; England; 52°33′32″N 0°07′05″W

Information
- Type: Academy
- Motto: Committed to learning and success for all
- Established: 1953
- Local authority: Cambridgeshire
- Department for Education URN: 138053 Tables
- Ofsted: Reports
- Acting Headteacher: Stevie Thornton
- Gender: Coeducational
- Age: 11 to 18
- Enrolment: approximately 1100
- Website: http://www.sirharrysmith.cambs.sch.uk

Sir Harry Smith Community College is a secondary school in Whittlesey, Cambridgeshire. Opened in 1953 on the former site of the Whittlesey Workhouse, the College is named after 19th Century English Army General Sir Harry Smith who was born in Whittlesey, and whose grave is situated in the cemetery adjacent to the school. The college, originally known simply as the Sir Harry Smith School, specialises in science and mathematics.

== History ==
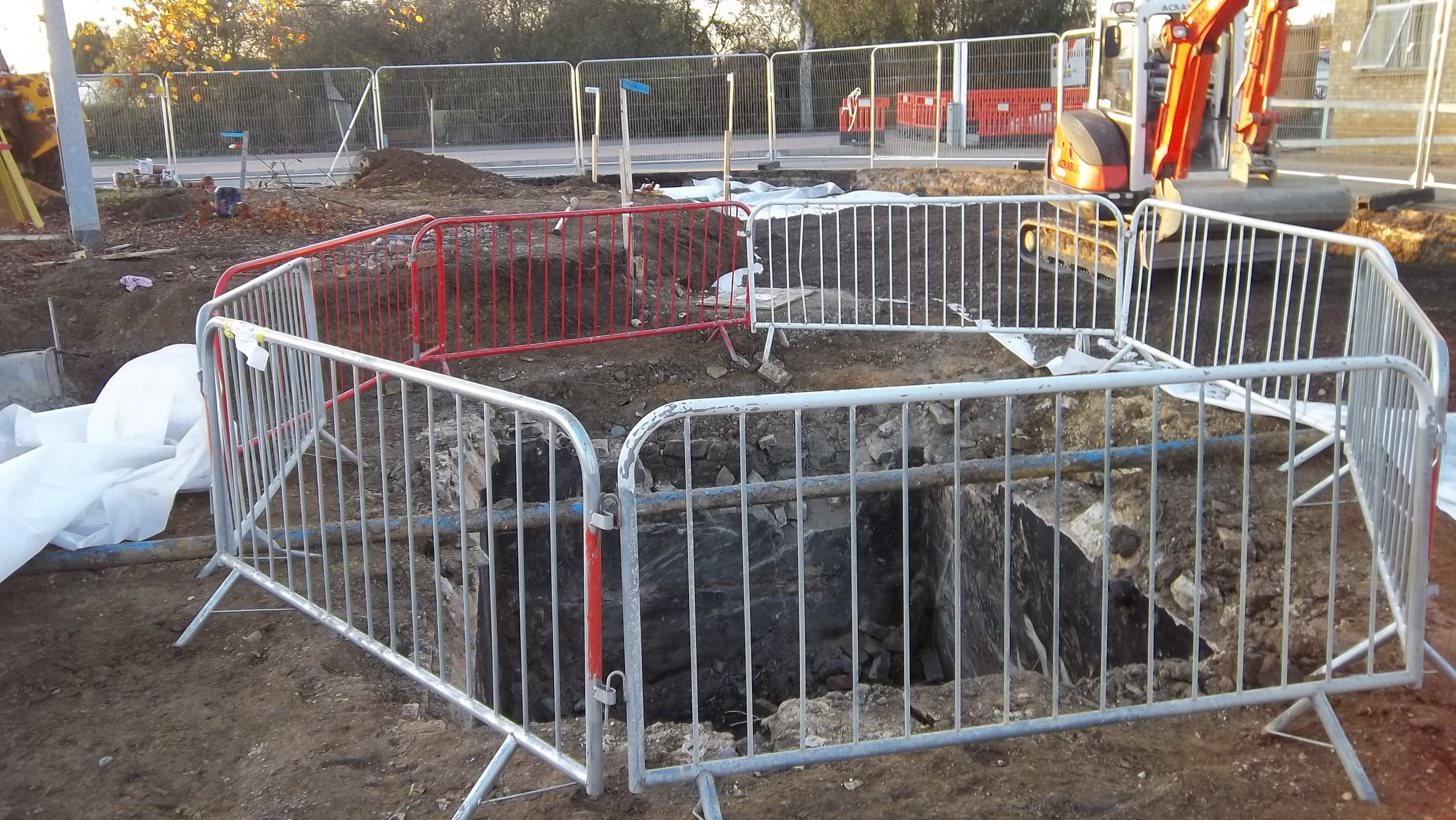
The cellar of the Whittlesey Workhouse as discovered during building work in November 2011. The workhouse was situated towards the front of the site, now occupied by the school car park.

Initial plans for a new senior school involved using the defunct Whittlesey Workhouse, but despite approval from the Whittlesea Board of Governors in 1938, the Isle of Ely Education Board decided that a new school should be built instead. The Workhouse was subsequently demolished and it was not until October 1947, following delays caused by the outbreak of World War II, that approval was finally given by the Ministry of Education for a new school. Designed by County Architect R. D. Robson and built by Whittlesey firm Rose & Sons, construction of the school started on the former workhouse site on Eastrea Road in August 1950. It was the first new school to be started in Cambridgeshire since the war, although not the first to be completed.

The school opened to 360 students in September 1953, replacing the separate Boys’ and Girls’ senior schools in Station Road and Low Cross respectively, with an official opening ceremony taking place in October the following year. Whittlesey-born Irving Nelson Burgess M.B.E. was selected from 226 applicants as the first Headmaster and to date remains the longest-serving Head, remaining until his retirement in December 1970. The school was known simply as 'The Sir Harry Smith School' until becoming a Community College in 1971.

The first phase of building featured relatively few classrooms, but instead focused on building the key facilities (such as halls, offices and cloakrooms) which would serve the school at its planned eventual capacity of 600 students. It consisted of three main corridors situated around a central hall and staircase, with additional classrooms and a dining hall housed in prefab ‘Horsa’ huts on the eastern side of the building. These huts were introduced across the country under Clement Attlee to help cope with the raising of the school leaving age to 15. Two more building instalments in 1965 and 1972 brought the school to its original planned capacity, after which additions were made as and when they were needed, with notable extensions and alterations carried out in the early 1980s, late 90s and throughout the 2000s.

A comprehensive overhaul of the original buildings was undertaken as part of the Building Schools for the Future scheme from 2011 to 2013; this work included two large classroom extensions, internal alterations to create a new dining area, the addition of new sports facilities and substantial re-landscaping of much of the site. Former Principal Jonathan Digby joined the school in 2008 and oversaw its transition to Academy status in 2012. At its most recent Ofsted inspection in November 2025, the school had 1093 pupils and was rated ‘Requires Improvement’.

The school was noted for its racing car project, headed by Mr. Kneeshaw, who, with a team of mechanics, built a biofuel car to be entered into the 2008 Silverstone 24-hour race. Of local historical interest are the stair bannisters in the main hall, which are made from wood salvaged from Portland House, a large 17th-Century house situated off Station Road and demolished in 1949.

The current Acting Headteacher, Stevie Thornton, was appointed as acting head in September 2026 following the resignation of former head, Dawn White.

== Facilities ==
Facilities at the school include a purpose-built Library Resource Centre, a separate building for sixth form students (named after Laurie Richards M.B.E., teacher at the school from 1967-2008 and Acting Principal 2007-08), two state-of-the-art drama suites and a purpose-built block for the SEN department. Sports facilities include two astro-turf pitches, tennis and netball courts and a climbing wall.

== Notable former pupils ==
- Micky Gynn, FA cup winning footballer
- David Proud, Former Eastenders Actor, after whom the school's SEN suite is named
