= Whittlesey =

Market town in Cambridgeshire, England

Coordinates: 52.558°N 0.130°W

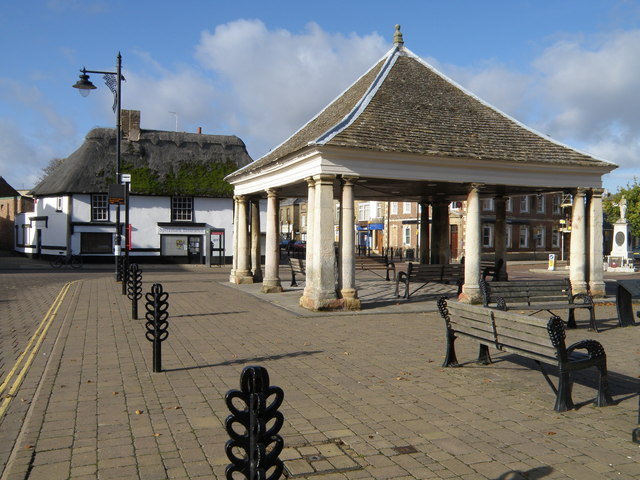
- Market square

- Location within Cambridgeshire
- Area: 4.058 km^{2} (1.567 sq mi)
- Population: 13,912 (2021 Census)
  - Density: 3,428/km^{2} (8,880/sq mi)
- OS grid reference: TL271967
- Civil parish: Whittlesey
- District: Fenland
- Shire county: Cambridgeshire
- Region: East
- Country: England
- Sovereign state: United Kingdom
- Post town: PETERBOROUGH
- Postcode district: PE7
- Dialling code: 01733
- Police: Cambridgeshire
- Fire: Cambridgeshire
- Ambulance: East of England

Whittlesey (also Whittlesea) is an historic market town and civil parish in the Fenland district of Cambridgeshire, England. Whittlesey is 6 miles (10 km) east of Peterborough. In 2021 the built-up area had a population of 13,823. The population of the parish was 17,667 at the 2021 Census.

== Toponymy ==
Whittlesey appears in the Cartularium Saxonicum (973 CE) as 'Witlesig', in the 1086 Domesday Book as 'Witesie', and in the Inquisitio Eliensis. The meaning is "Wit(t)el's island", deriving from either Witil, "the name of a moneyer", or a diminutive of Witta, a personal name; + "eg", meaning "'island', also used of a piece of firm land in a fen."

The official name of the civil parish is 'Whittlesey', which spelling is also used by the Royal Mail and Ordnance Survey. The town's railway station uses the alternative spelling of 'Whittlesea'.

== History ==
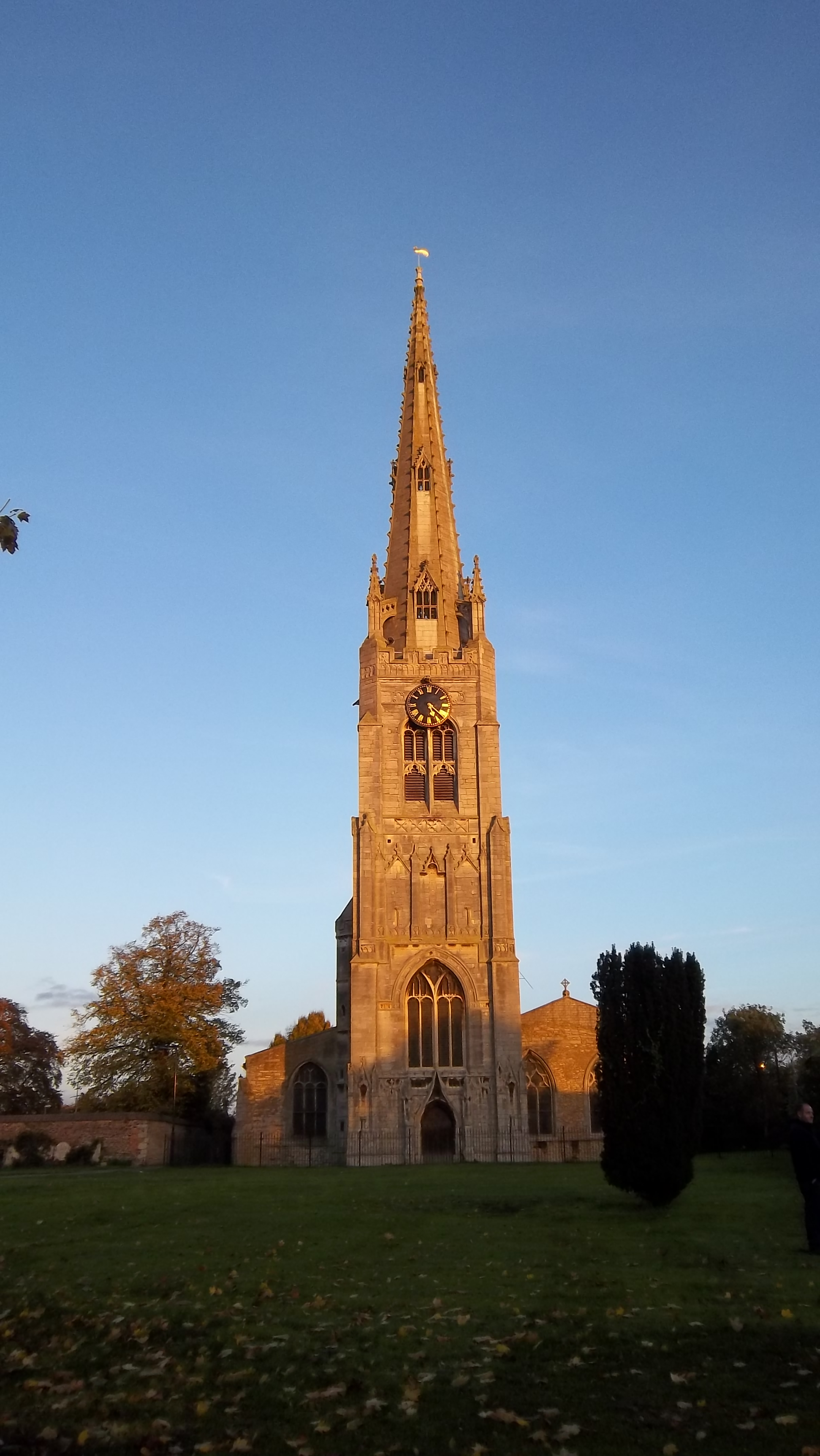
The spire of St Mary's church viewed from the west

Before the fens were drained, Whittlesey was an island of dry ground surrounded by them. Excavations of nearby Flag Fen indicate thriving local settlements as far back as 1000 BCE. At Must Farm quarry, a Bronze Age settlement is described as "Britain's Pompeii" due to its relatively good condition. In 2016 it was being excavated by the University of Cambridge's Cambridge Archaeological Unit. At Must Farm at least five homes of 3,000 years in age have been found, along with Britain's most complete prehistoric wooden wheel, dating back to the late Bronze Age.

Whittlesey was linked to Peterborough in the west and March in the east by the Roman Fen Causeway, probably built in the 1st century CE. Roman artefacts have been recovered at nearby Eldernell, and a Roman skeleton was discovered in the nearby village of Eastrea during construction of its village hall in 2010.

The town's two parishes of St Mary's and St Andrew's belonged to the abbeys in Thorney and Ely respectively until the Dissolution of the Monasteries about 1540. Despite the proximity of Peterborough, Whittlesey is in the Diocese of Ely.

Nearby Whittlesey Mere was a substantial lake surrounded by marsh until it was drained in 1851. According to the traveller Celia Fiennes, who saw it in 1697, the mere was "3-mile broad and six-mile long. In the midst is a little island where a great store of Wildfowle breed.... The ground is all wett and marshy but there are severall little Channells runs into it which by boats people go up to this place; when you enter the mouth of the Mer it looks formidable and its often very dangerous by reason of sudden winds that will rise like Hurricanes...." The town is still accessible by water, being connected to the River Nene by King's Dyke, which forms part of the Nene/Ouse Navigation. Moorings can be found at Ashline Lock, alongside the Manor Leisure Centre's cricket and football pitches.

Whittlesey was significant for its brickyards, around which the former hamlet of King's Dyke was based for much of the 20th century, although only one now remains, following the closure of the Saxon brickworks in 2011.

The local clay soil was also used to make cob boundary walls during a period in which there was a brick tax. Some examples of these roofed walls still stand today and are claimed to be unique in Fenland, certain sections of Whittlesey's "Mud Walls" were given Grade II Listed status in 2021, and given further formal protection by local council in 2026.

Whittlesey had a large number of public houses. In 1797, a local farmer noted in his diary, "They like drinking better than fighting in Whittlesea." Among the public houses that have closed are the Plough, the Letter A, the Letter C, the Queen Adelaide, the Old Crown, the King's Head, the Morton Folk and the White Horse, many of which are now private residences.

Whittlesey was an important trade route in the late Bronze Age (about 1100–800 BCE). Evidence for this was found at the archaeological site of Must Farm, where log boats, roundhouses, bowls with food in them, and the most complete wooden wheel were housed.

In 1832, Whittlesey, then spelt Whittlesea, was ravaged by the second cholera epidemic, along with nearby Peterborough. According to a diary entry of Mrs Thomas Shaftoe Robertson, manageress of the Lincoln Theatre Circuit, "What a gap in my journal! April to November! But better not record such a summer as I have passed. God deliver me from such another. What suffering, what anguish, and loss! Whittlesea! Shall I ever have the idea of entering that place again? The cholera there raged in all its fury. I was numbered amongst its victims, and, false or true, was certainly dreadfully ill. All Peterborough was in a languishing state. Mr Walker, the surgeon, behaved most kindly, and never charged me a shilling." A year later this entry was amended: "Let me correct this error. The year after he sent me in a bill of £5 14s 6d." The Lincoln Theatre Circuit also included at various times Whittlesey, Wisbech, Boston and other nearby towns.

=== Churches ===
St Mary's Church contains 15th-century work, but most of the building is later. It has one of the largest buttressed spires in Cambridgeshire. The spire is 171 feet (52 metres) high. The church also contains a chapel, which was restored in 1862 as a memorial to Sir Harry Smith. St Mary's is a Grade I listed building.

St Andrew's Church originally dates back to the 13th and 14 centuries, with a major restoration taking place in 1872. The church, featuring a three-storeyed west tower with an eastern clock face, blends the Perpendicular and Decorated Gothic architectural styles of the 13th to 15th centuries. St Andrew's is listed Grade II*.

Both churches still see active use, each with a separate congregation.

=== Market Place ===
The market is held in the Market Place every Friday. The right to hold a weekly market was first granted in 1715, although there have been several periods since in which the market did not function, for example from the late 1700s until about 1850.

In the centre of the Market Place is the Buttercross, dating back to 1680. Originally a place for people to sell goods, the structure was considered useless in the 1800s and only saved from demolition when a local businessman donated some slate tiles for the roof. Latterly it served as a bus shelter, until the bus services were relocated from the Market Place to a purpose-built terminal in Grosvenor Road.

== Governance ==
There are three tiers of local government covering Whittlesey, at civil parish (town), district, and county level: Whittlesey Town Council, Fenland District Council, and Cambridgeshire County Council. The district and county councils are also members of the Cambridgeshire and Peterborough Combined Authority, led by the directly elected Mayor of Cambridgeshire and Peterborough. The town council is based at Peel House, 8 Queen Street. The civil parish of Whittlesey includes the town itself and the villages of Coates, Eastrea, Pondersbridge and Turves.

Whittlesey forms part of the parliamentary constituency of North East Cambridgeshire.

=== Administrative history ===
There were two ancient parishes covering Whittlesey: Whittlesey St Andrew and Whittlesey St Mary, both of which formed part of the North Witchford hundred of Cambridgeshire. The North Witchford hundred formed part of the Isle of Ely, which was historically a liberty under the secular jurisdiction of the Bishop of Ely. Both parishes churches were in the town, and each parish also included extensive tracts of surrounding countryside. The boundaries between the two parishes were heavily intermingled and sometimes disputed. When parishes were given civil responsibilities under the poor laws from the 17th century onwards, the two parishes agreed to work together as a joint parish for the purposes of administering the poor laws. Under the Whittlesey Improvement Act 1849, the two parishes were formally united into a single civil parish, giving official recognition to the long-standing informal union under the poor laws. The boundaries of the two ecclesiastical parishes were rationalised at the same time.

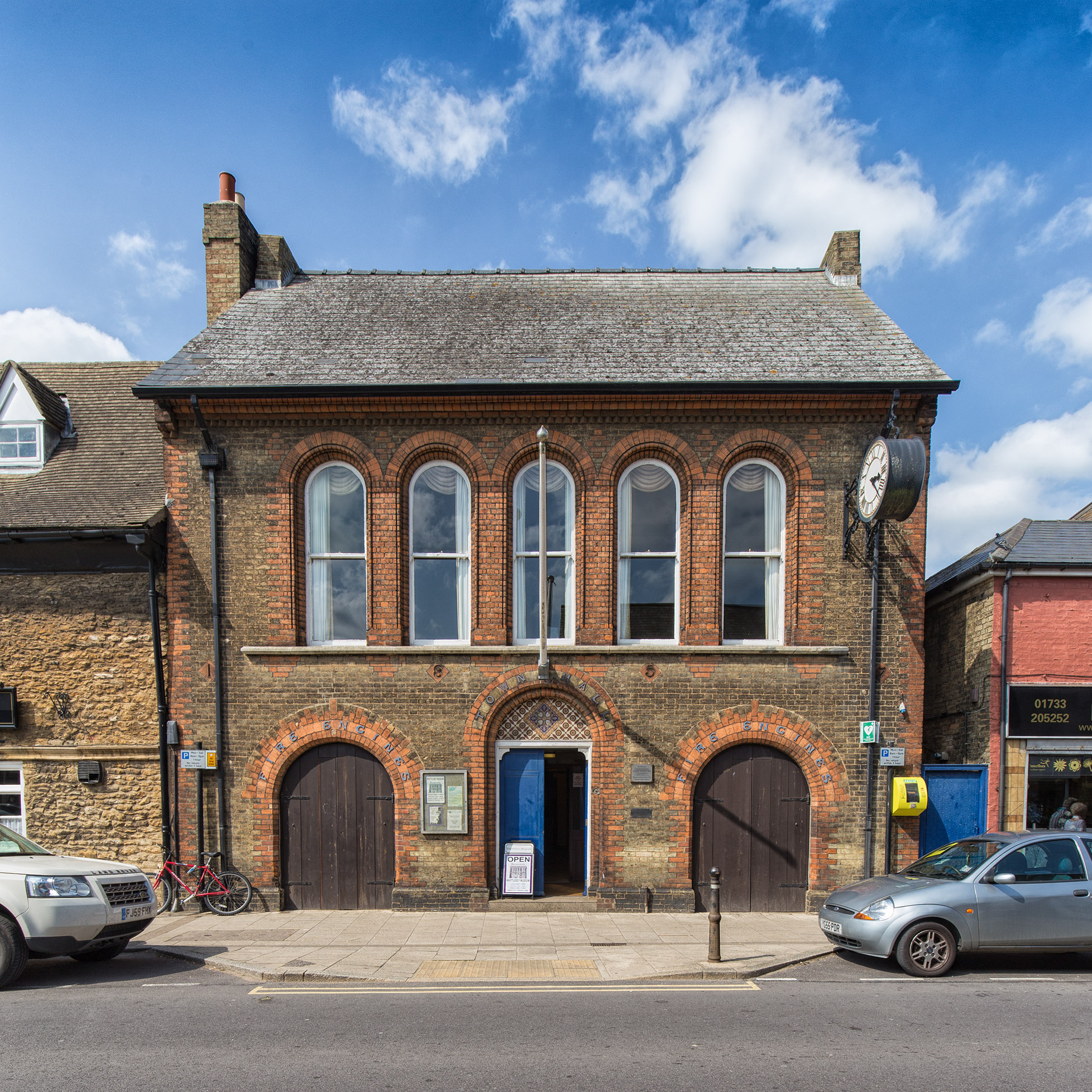
Town Hall, 18 Market Street: Now Whittlesey Museum

The 1849 Act also established a body of improvement commissioners to provide public services and infrastructure to the area around the town itself. The commissioners' district was converted into an urban district under the Local Government Act 1894. The 1894 Act also directed that parishes could not straddle district boundaries, and so the parish was split into a Whittlesey Urban parish covering the urban district and a Whittlesey Rural parish covering the remainder. The urban and rural parishes were reunited in 1926 as a single parish of Whittlesey when the urban district was enlarged to cover the whole area. The urban district council met at Whittlesey Town Hall on Market Street, which also served as a magistrates' court and fire engine house. Between 1889 and 1965, the Isle of Ely was an administrative county with its own county council, whilst also forming part of the wider geographical county of Cambridgeshire. Between 1965 and 1974, the administrative county covering Whittlesey was called Cambridgeshire and Isle of Ely.

Whittlesey Urban District was abolished in 1974 under the Local Government Act 1972. District-level functions passed to the new Fenland District Council. No successor parish was created for the area of the abolished urban district at the time of the 1974 reforms and so it became unparished. The area of the former urban district was made a new parish called Whittlesey in 1981, with its parish council taking the name Whittlesey Town Council.

== Geography ==
Whittlesey is between Peterborough, 6 miles (10 km) to the west, and March, 11 miles (18 km) to the east. It is bordered to the north by the River Nene and to the south by Whittlesey Dyke. Historically, it was connected with Peterborough and March by the Roman Fen Causeway of the first century CE, a route roughly followed by the modern A605.

To the north of Whittlesey is a recorded Ramsar site, a protected wetland. There is also Morton's Leam, which is an SSSI of notable diversity. To the south-east is Lattersey Nature Reserve.

== Transport ==
Whittlesea railway station, using the town's alternative spelling, is on the Ely to Peterborough Line, also known as the Hereward Line; it is served by direct trains to Cambridge, Ely, Ipswich and Peterborough. Services are operated by Greater Anglia.

Bus services in the area are operated by Dews Coaches.

Whittlesey town centre hosts the annual Fenland BusFest event. It is one of the area's most popular vintage vehicle gatherings.

== Culture and community ==
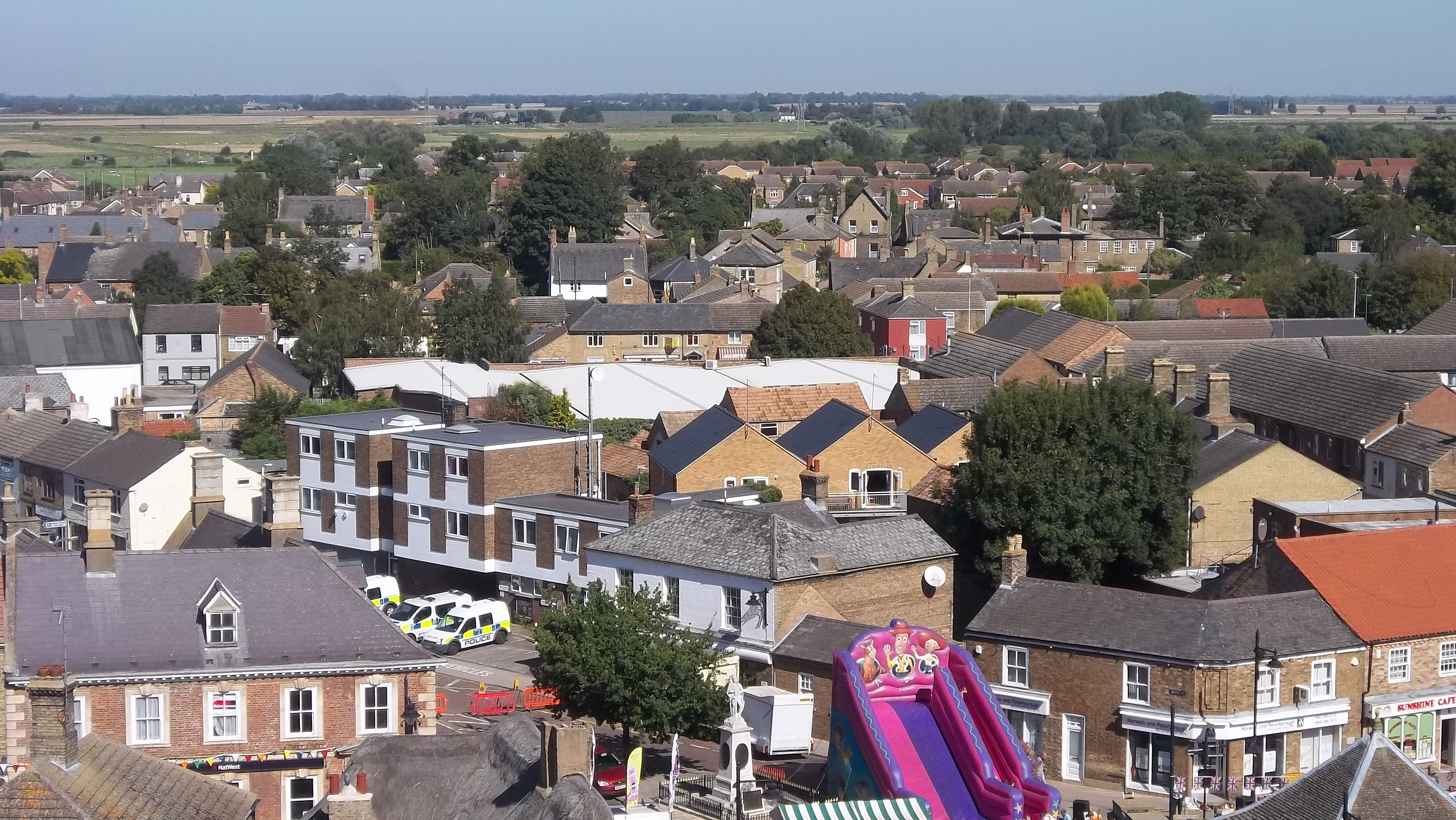
Looking north over the Market Place from the spire of St Mary's during the 2012 Whittlesey Festival

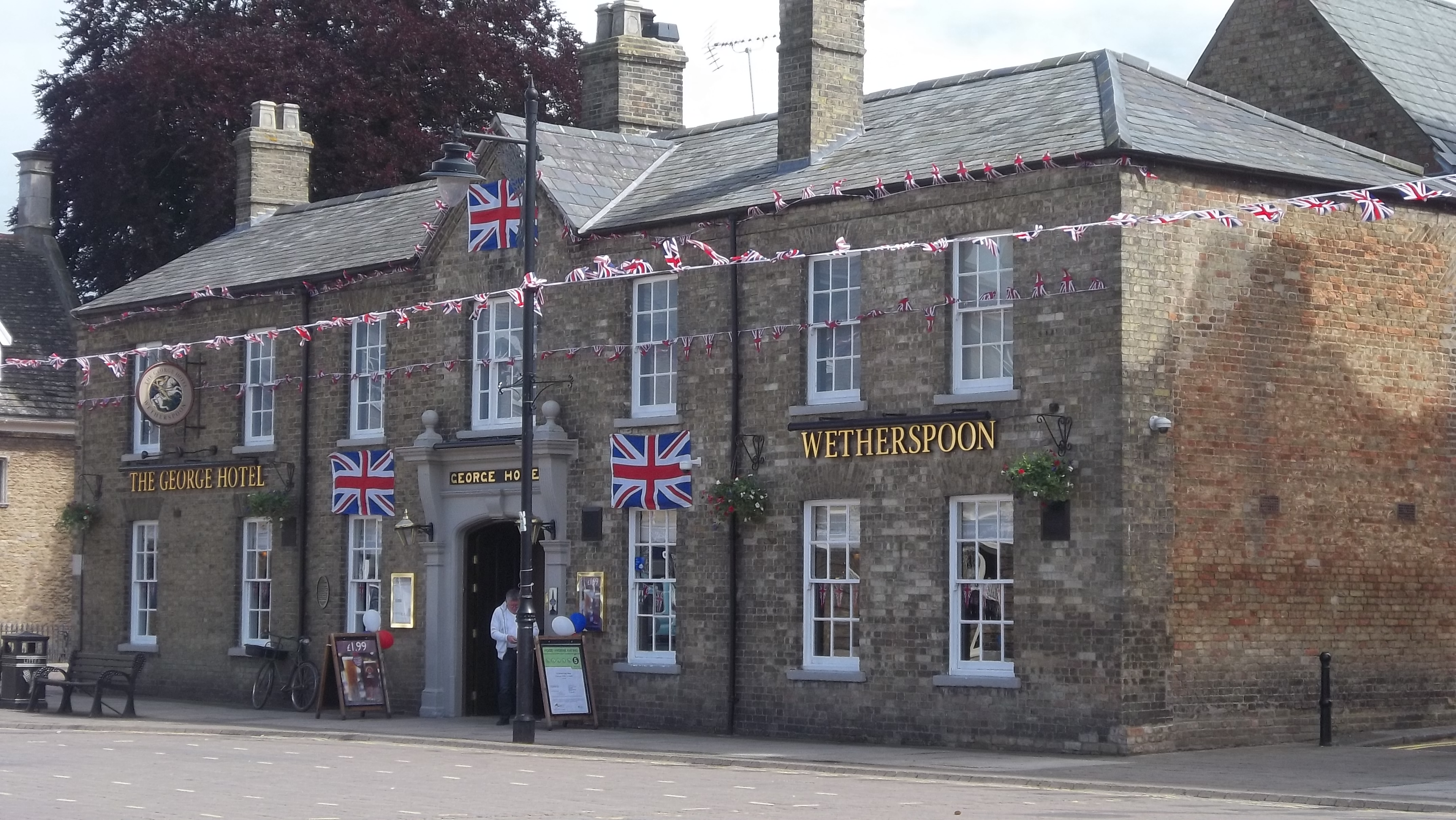
The 18th-century George Hotel (now a Wetherspoons pub) decorated for the Queen's Diamond Jubilee in June 2012

Whittlesey Summer Festival fills much of the centre each September. Attractions have included a classic car display, an Italian food stall, fairground rides, a steam engine, and in 2009, a flying display by a Hawker Hurricane of the Battle of Britain Memorial Flight. An art competition for students of Sir Harry Smith Community College runs during the festival, with a display at Whittlesey Christian Church. At the 2009 festival local people raised £10,000 for bushfire victims in Whittlesea, Victoria, Australia.

From 2011 to 2015, there was rivalry between the supermarket chains Tesco and Sainsbury's to build on neighbouring sites in Eastrea Road. Dubbed "Supermarket Gate" in the press, the dispute was resolved when Sainsbury's won approval in June 2015 for its scheme for a supermarket, business park and country park. Plans for over 400 houses on an adjacent site, construction of which began in late 2014, caused concern about extra traffic on the A605. The Sainsbury's store never went ahead, however, and instead, a new Aldi store was opened on Eastrea Road in June 2023.

Close to the King's Dyke brickworks stand three 80-metre wind turbines, the largest on-shore turbines in England. They power the McCains chips plant.

Whittlesey Museum, located in the Old Town Hall, records the natural and cultural heritage of the town and surrounding area.

=== Whittlesea Straw Bear ===
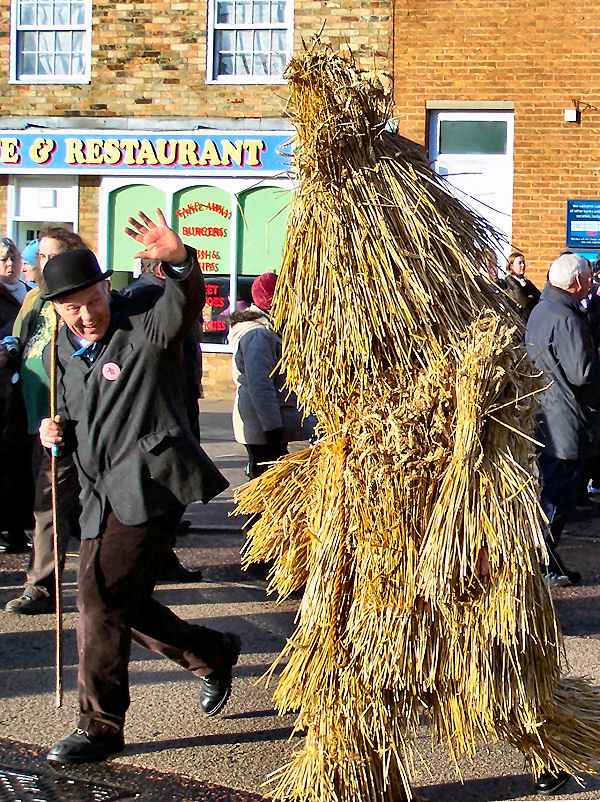
The Whittlesea Straw Bear 2008

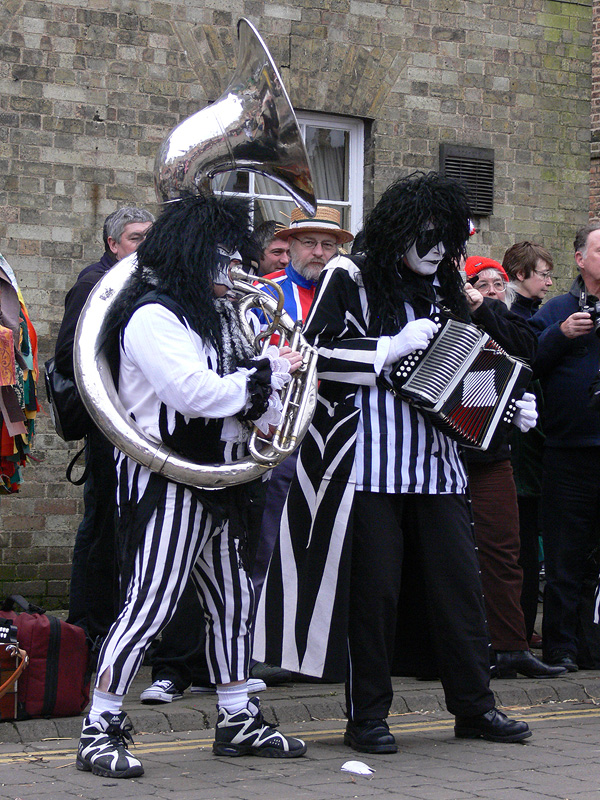
Musicians of Pig Dyke Molly dance team playing at Whittlesea Straw Bear Festival 2007

The festival of the Straw Bear or "Strawbower" is a custom known only to a small area of Fenland on the borders of Huntingdonshire and Isle of Ely, Cambridgeshire, including Ramsey Mereside. Similar ritual animals appear elsewhere in Europe, including parts of Germany at Shrovetide.

On Plough Tuesday, the day after the first Monday after Twelfth Night, a man or a boy is covered from head to foot in straw and led from house to house, where he danced in exchange for gifts of money, food or beer. The festival was of a stature that farmers would often reserve their best straw for making the bear.

The custom died out about 1909, probably because the police saw it as begging, but it was revived by the Whittlesea Society in 1980. It has now expanded to cover a whole weekend, when the Bear appears not on Plough Tuesday but on the second weekend in January. On the Saturday of the festival, the Bear progresses round the streets with its attendant "keeper" and musicians, followed by traditional dance sides (mostly visitors), including morris men and women, molly dancers, rappers and longsword dancers, clog dancers, who perform at points along the route.

The Bear dances to a tune (reminiscent of the hymn "Jesus Bids us Shine") which featured on Rattlebone and Ploughjack, a 1976 LP by Ashley Hutchings, along with a description of the original custom that had partly inspired the Whittlesey revival. "Sessions" of traditional music take place in pubs during the day and evening, and a barn dance or ceilidh and a Cajun dance end the Saturday night. The bear "costume" is burned at a ceremony at Sunday lunchtime. Shrovetide bear costumes are also burned ceremonially after use in Germany.)

The Whittlesea Straw Bear and Keeper appear in the album art of The Young Knives' album, Voices of Animals and Men.

== Media ==
Local news and television programmes are provided by BBC East and ITV Anglia. Television signals are received from the Sandy Heath TV transmitter, BBC East Midlands and ITV Central can also be received from the Waltham TV transmitter.

Local radio stations are BBC Radio Cambridgeshire, Heart East, Greatest Hits Radio East, Smooth East Midlands (formerly Connect FM), Peterborough Community Radio (PCRFM), and More Muzic Radio, a community based station which broadcast online.

The town is served by the local newspapers, Cambs Times and Peterborough Telegraph.

== Education ==
The town has a secondary school, Sir Harry Smith Community College, which opened in 1953 on the site of Whittlesey Workhouse, and three primary schools (New Road Primary, Alderman Jacobs, Park Lane Primary) Park Lane, Sir Harry Smith Community College and New Road Primary are a part of the ASPIRE alliance. There is another primary school in neighbouring Coates.

== Sport ==
The town has a non–league football club, Whittlesey Athletic, which plays in the Eastern Counties League Division One North, at Feldale Field.

== Notable people ==
In birth order:

- Sir Harry George Waklyn Smith (1788–1860), best known for a role in the Battle of Aliwal in 1846 in India, was born in the town. He rose militarily from a rifleman to a major general and Baronet of Aliwal. He was governor of the Cape of Good Hope during unrest in 1847–1852.
- John Clare (1793–1864), a poet, mentions "Whittlesea's reed-wooded mere" under January in his poem "The Shepherd's Calendar".
- L. P. Hartley (1895–1972), novelist, was born in Whittlesey. His best known novels are the Eustace and Hilda trilogy and The Go-Between.
- Edward Storey (1930–2018), a Whittlesey-born poet, published some ten volumes of verse, a biography of John Clare, an autobiography and some libretti. He worked with Poets in schools for Eastern Arts and broadcast on the BBC.
- Gary Dighton (1968–2015), a British national time-trial cyclist who competed in the 1992 Barcelona Olympics and broke the national 25-mile time-trial record with 48:07. He attended Sir Harry Smith Community College.
- David Proud (born 1983), a writer and the first disabled actor to have a regular role in the BBC soap opera EastEnders, was living in Whittlesey and attended Sir Harry Smith Community College.

== See also ==
- Must Farm Bronze Age settlement
- List of places in Cambridgeshire
- Straw bear (German traditional character)
- Sir Harry Smith Community College
- Whittlesey Workhouse
- Flag Fen is between the town and Peterborough.
- Whittlesey Athletic F.C.
