= Turves, Cambridgeshire =

Village in England

Coordinates: 52.55°N 0.03°W

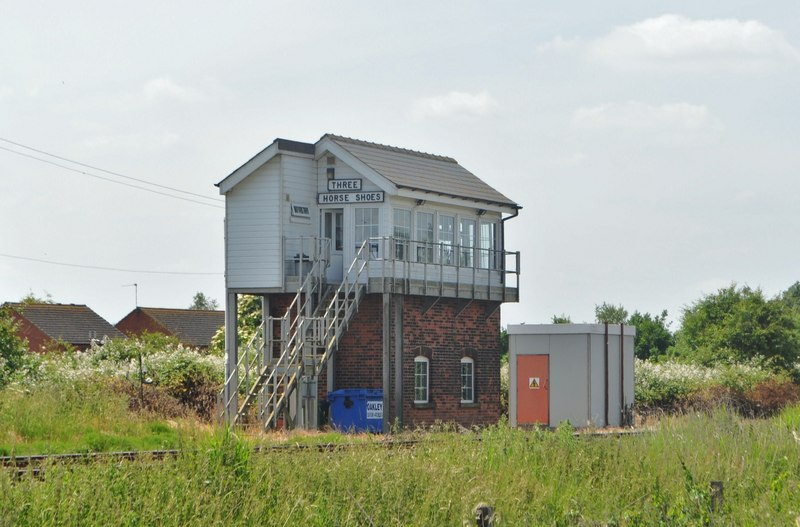
Three Horse Shoes signal box, named after the pub in Turves

Turves is a village in the civil parish of Whittlesey, Fenland District, Cambridgeshire, England. It lies east of the town of Whittlesey, south of the A605 road and the Twenty Foot River, and on the Ely–Peterborough line railway between Whittlesey and March, with a level crossing in the village. The local council describes it as "a quiet residential area on the back road between March and Whittlesey".

A former pub, the Shovel and Spade, next Hardham's Drove North had closed by 1805. Another pub, the Three Horse Shoes, dates back to at least 1822 and gives its name to a nearby railway signal box.

There were Quakers living in Turves by the 1670s, and the first edition of the Ordnance Survey map shows Quaker's Drain, on the line of the present road Quaker's Drove, south of the village. It is said that the Quaker settlement "seems to have been" on this road, where some thatched cottages survived into the 1930s.

The Hereward Way long-distance footpath from Peterborough to Ely passes through Turves, going south along March Road and Burnthouse Road and then east along Quaker's Drove.
