= Flag Fen =

Archaeological open-air museum in Cambridgeshire, England

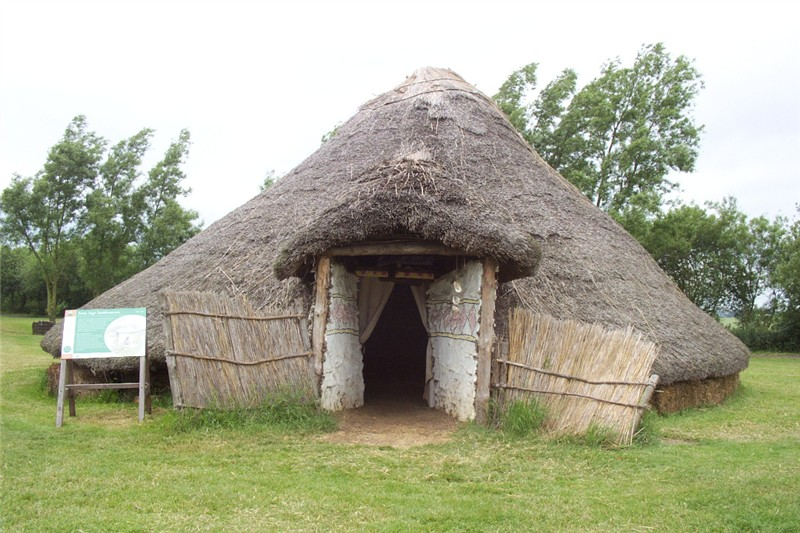
- The reconstructed Iron Age roundhouse at Flag Fen

- Location within Cambridgeshire
- Coordinates: 52.574°N 0.190°W
- Type: Archaeological open-air museum
- Website: Flag Fen

Flag Fen, east of Peterborough, England, is a Bronze Age site which was constructed about 3,500 years ago and consists of more than 60,000 timbers arranged in five very long rows, creating a wooden causeway (around 1 km or 0.6 mi long) across the wet fenland. Part-way across the structure a small island was formed. Items associated with it have led scholars to conclude that the island was of religious significance. Archaeological work began in 1982 at the site, which is located 800 m (0.5 mi) east of Fengate. Flag Fen is now part of the Greater Fens Museum Partnership. A visitor centre has been constructed on site and some areas have been reconstructed, including a typical Iron Age roundhouse dwelling. A section of the original causeway is preserved in wet conditions in the Preservation Hall.

== Construction ==
A Neolithic trackway once ran across what archaeologists have termed the "Flag Fen Basin", from a dry-land area known as Fengate to a natural clay island called Northey. The basin is an embayment of low-lying land on the western margins of the Fens. The level of inundation by 1300 BC led the occupants to construct a timber causeway along the trackway route. The causeway and centre platform were formed by driving 'thousands of posts with long pencil-like tips' through the 'accumulating peaty muds' and into the firmer ground below. The resulting structure covered three and a half acres (1.4 ha).

Dendrochronological analysis (dating of the posts by studying tree rings) led to an estimated date for the various stages of construction of between 1365 and 967 BC. Some of the timbers, such as oak, were not native to the local environment. They made a significant effort to transport the timbers to the site from distant sources.

=== Purpose ===
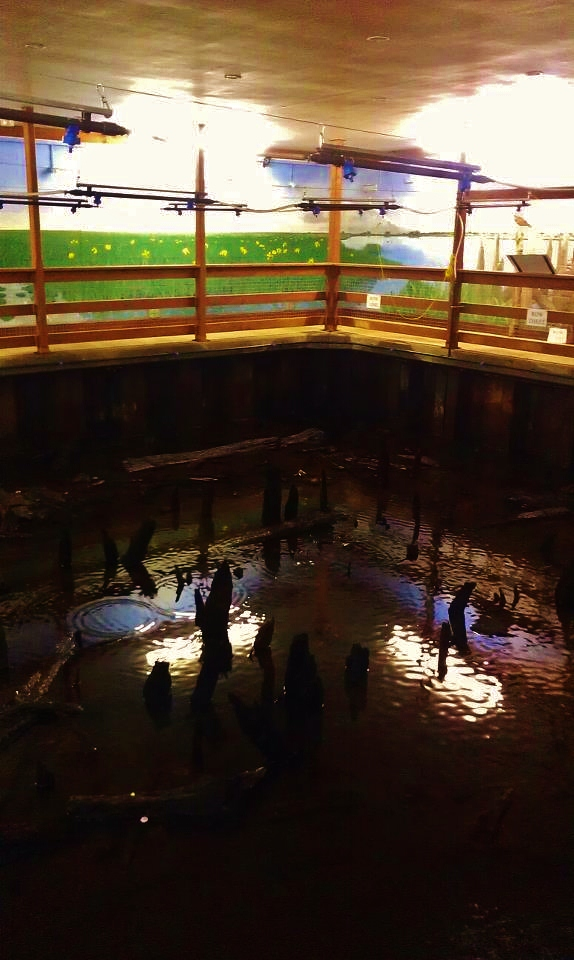
The wet room at Flag Fen; below are the exposed timbers of part of the Bronze Age causeway and above are the water sprinklers to keep them constantly wet.

Many items denoting 'rank and prestige' were deposited in the water surrounding Flag Fen, including swords, spearheads, 'gold earrings, tiny pins and brooches'. Archaeologist Francis Pryor, who discovered the site in 1982, suggests that 'settlers often vied for social status by showing they could afford to discard valuable possessions'. There is also evidence of intentional destruction before placement, e.g. daggers broken in half placed on top of each other.

Other finds included small, polished, white stones of a type not known in the area, indicating that they had been intentionally collected and transported to and placed at the site. Other artefacts found were animal bones, including horse mandibles. Horses were very valuable to the prehistoric people, since they provided a means of transport and could supplement or replace man-power. For example, they could be used to carry or pull timbers on sledges over long distances. Significance is also drawn from the discovery of the ritual deposits within thirty metres of the timber post line, and only on its southern boundary. The amount, type, and placement of deposits, which continued for more than 1,200 years, support the theory that 'at least one facet of the site' was a role as a 'religious monument'.

On Northey Island many round barrows contemporary with Flag Fen were found. These seemed to be constructed over the dwellings of 'chiefs'. Mike Parker Pearson refers to this as the "Land of the Dead". There is also evidence of farming, including sheep remains, contemporary with the site. Phosphate analysis reveals high concentrations of cremations in the barrows, in the form of satellite and secondary burials in the round barrows. This suggests that the primary burials may have been of chiefs, or socially powerful/respected people, and that some people may have paid to be buried close to the person they respected or followed.

=== Destruction and preservation ===
Because of its waterlogged condition the Flag Fen Basin was an area where peat deposits developed around 2000 BC, and they survive there today. The anaerobic conditions generated by silt deposits from the fens protected the wooden posts and rafters of the collapsed structures from rotting away under the influence of air and bacteria. In the 10th century BC the ground level was much lower than today, increasing around 1 mm (0.039 inches) per year as autumnal debris was added to the surface of the fens. By the early Roman period most of the structure was covered and preserved.

== Archaeological investigation ==
The site was discovered in 1982 when a team led by Francis Pryor carried out a survey of dykes in the area funded by English Heritage. In 1992 Pryor told National Geographic that he "stumbled – literally – upon' Flag Fen 'when he tripped on a piece of wood lying in the bottom of a drainage ditch." Excavation commenced in the Summer of 1984 and by 1990 had revealed vertical and horizontal timbers, animal bones, a bronze dagger and other metal items and fragments, flint implements and 400 potsherds. Further finds included items imported from continental Europe and the oldest surviving wooden wheel found in England, dating from 1300 BC.

In 2012 DigVentures ran the world's first crowdfunded excavation, raising £30,000 to enable a three-week excavation at Flag Fen. The site had experienced a 50% decline in visitors since the large-scale English Heritage-funded excavations had finished in 1995. The project's remit was to help revitalise the heritage attraction whilst providing detailed scientific information on the preservation of the waterlogged timbers. The project involved around 250 members of the public from 11 countries, supported by a specialist team including partners from the British Museum, Durham University, Birmingham University, York Archaeological Trust, University College London and English Heritage to assist in the scientific investigations. 130 members of public received hands-on training in archaeological techniques on site and visitor numbers increased by 29% from the previous year. Francis Pryor was supportive of the initiative and wrote afterwards: "happily, it was an experiment that worked: the participants had a good time, and the archaeology was professionally excavated, to a very high standard."

=== Preservation ===
Archaeological work at Flag Fen is ongoing. Extensive drainage of the surrounding area, which benefits agriculture, means that many of the timbers are drying out and are threatened with destruction by such exposure. One section of poles is being preserved by replacing the cellulose in the wood with water-carried wax, impregnating the wood over the years. This technique is also being used to preserve Seahenge and the Hassholme Boat. Another preservation technique used for timbers found at the site is freeze drying.

A well-organised visitor centre, the Flag Fen Bronze and Iron Age Centre, has been constructed there with a museum and exhibitions. In the preservation hall one section of the timbers is preserved in situ and prevented from drying out by misting with water. Also at the site are reconstructions of two Bronze Age roundhouses and one from the Iron Age. A section of the Roman road known as the Fen Causeway has been exposed and crosses the site. In addition there is a reconstruction of a prehistoric droveway used for moving livestock.

=== Related books ===
In 1991, Pryor published his first book about Flag Fen, entitled Flag Fen: Prehistoric Fenland Centre, as one of a series co-produced by English Heritage and B.T. Batsford. The final monograph on the site – entitled The Flag Fen Basin: Archaeology and environment of a Fenland Landscape – was published in 2001 as an English Heritage Archaeological Report. The report is now available online through the Archaeology Data Service. Pryor has followed this with a third book on the site, published by Tempus in 2005. Entitled Flag Fen: Life and Death of a Prehistoric Landscape, it is what he has described as a "major revision" of his 1991 work, for instance repudiating his earlier "lake village" concept.

=== Must Farm ===
Around 2 km (1.2 mi) south of Flag Fen is Must Farm Bronze Age settlement. Log boats recovered there are preserved and displayed at Flag Fen.

== Wildlife ==
Flag Fen is also home to an abundance of wildlife owing to the variety of habitats on the site, which includes extensive grassland, traditionally managed hedgerows and woodland and a freshwater mere and dyke.

=== 'Bronze Age' BioBlitz ===
On 2 August 2014, a BioBlitz organised by Vivacity found 190 species, including 53 lichens and the endangered European water vole and barn owl. The event also included a talk by the People's Trust for Endangered Species and used a wildlife trail to highlight species that would have been present 3,000 years ago, such as the grey wolf, brown bear and Eurasian beaver.

=== Meadow proposals ===
In 2014, Buglife was successful in a bid to create wild-flower meadows across Peterborough, which will include a traditionally managed hay meadow at Flag Fen.

== Gallery ==
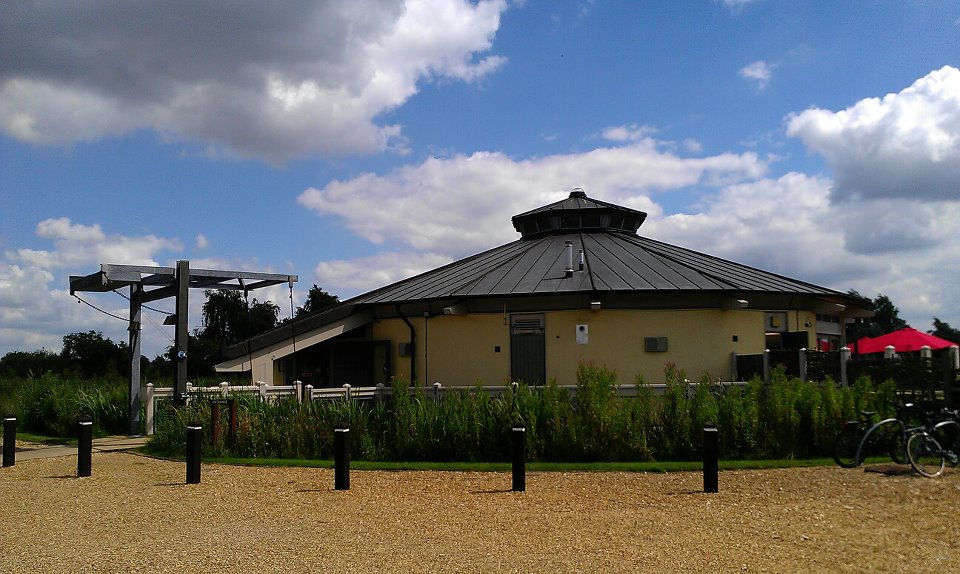
The visitor centre entrance

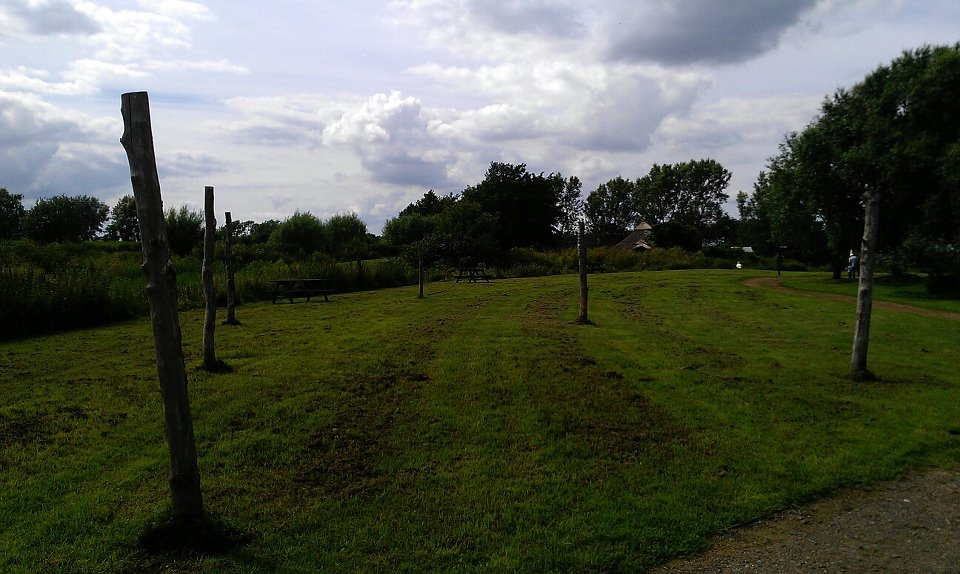
Wooden posts marking the position of the Bronze Age trackway

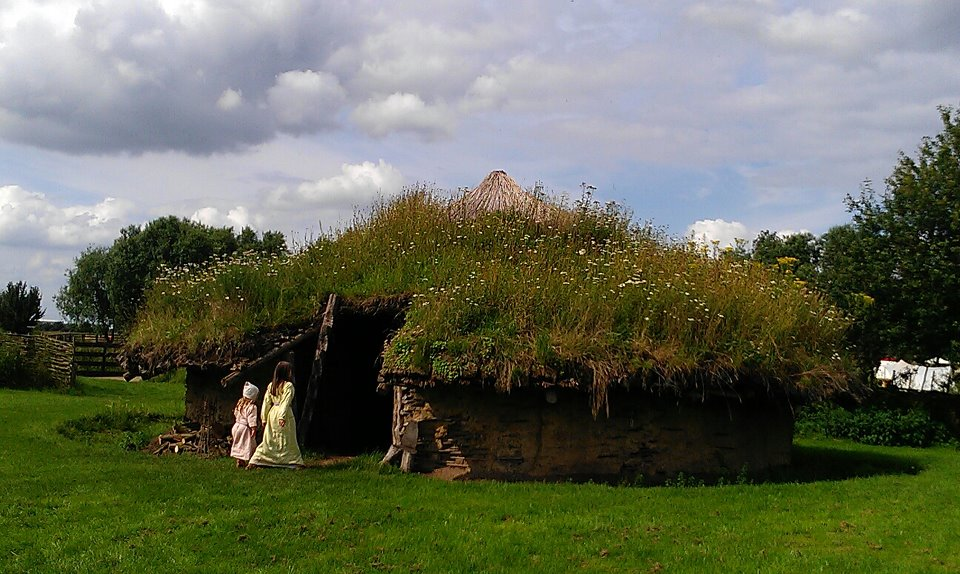
The reconstructed Bronze Age roundhouse at Flag Fen

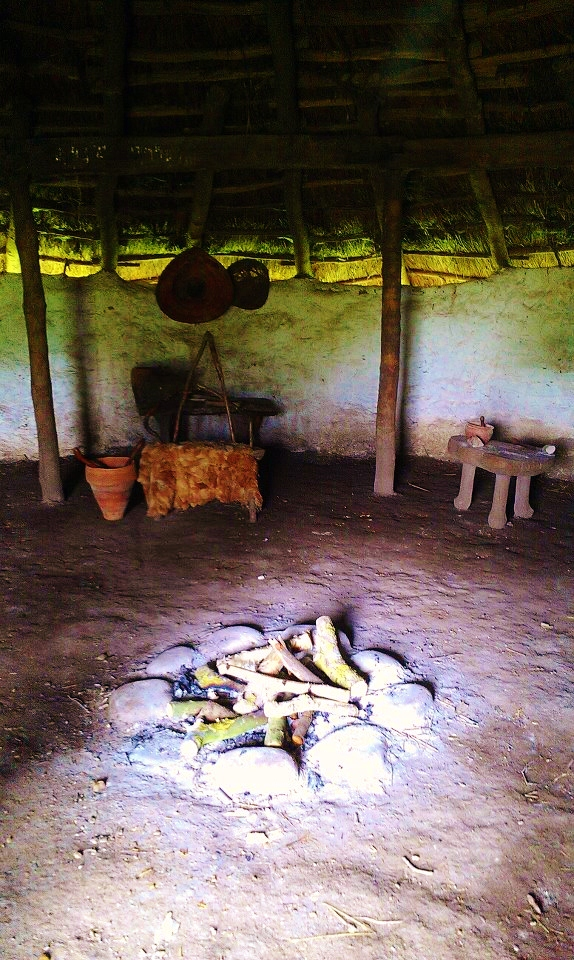
The interior of the reconstructed Bronze Age roundhouse

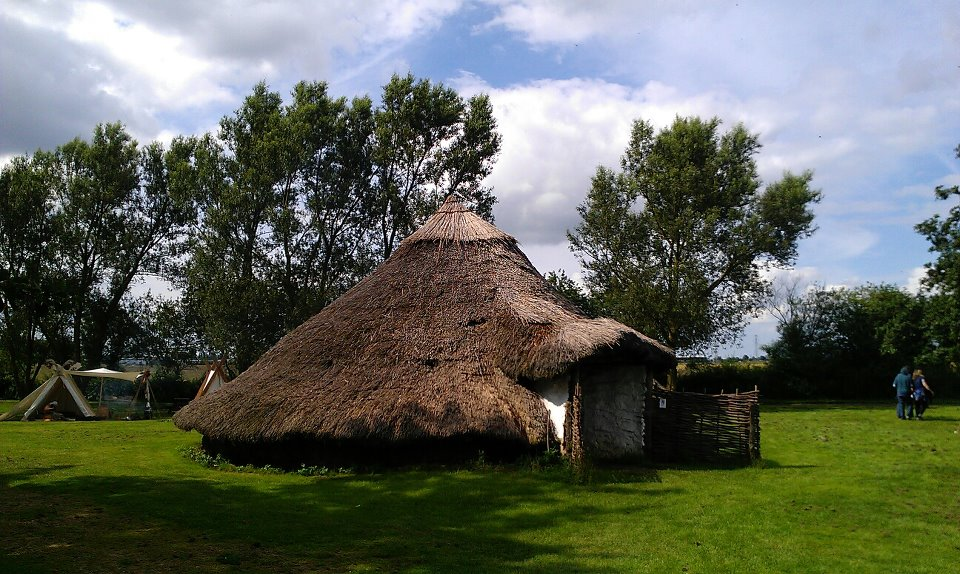
The reconstructed Iron Age roundhouse at Flag Fen

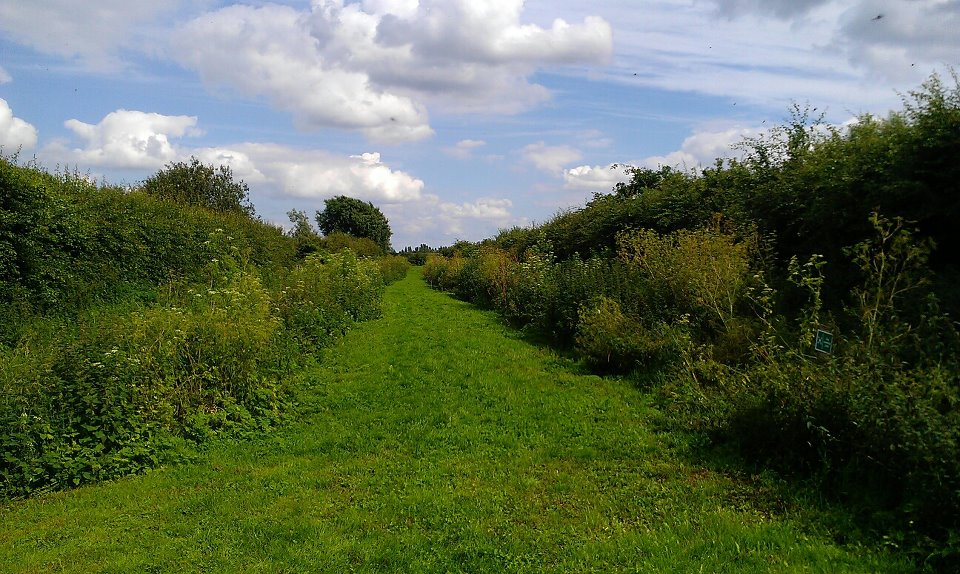
The reconstructed Bronze-Iron Age droveway at Flag Fen

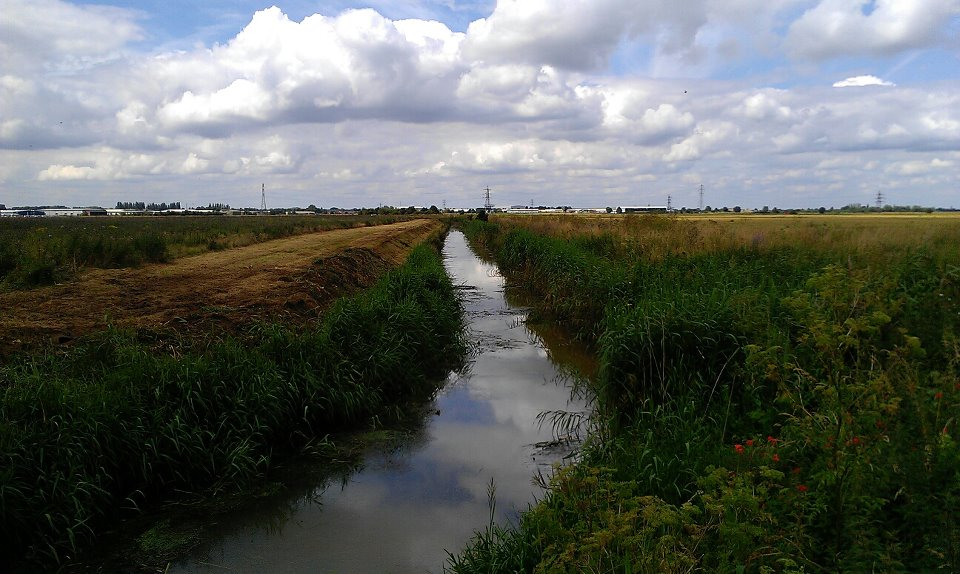
The 14th-century Mustdyke constructed across the site, which bisects the Bronze Age trackway

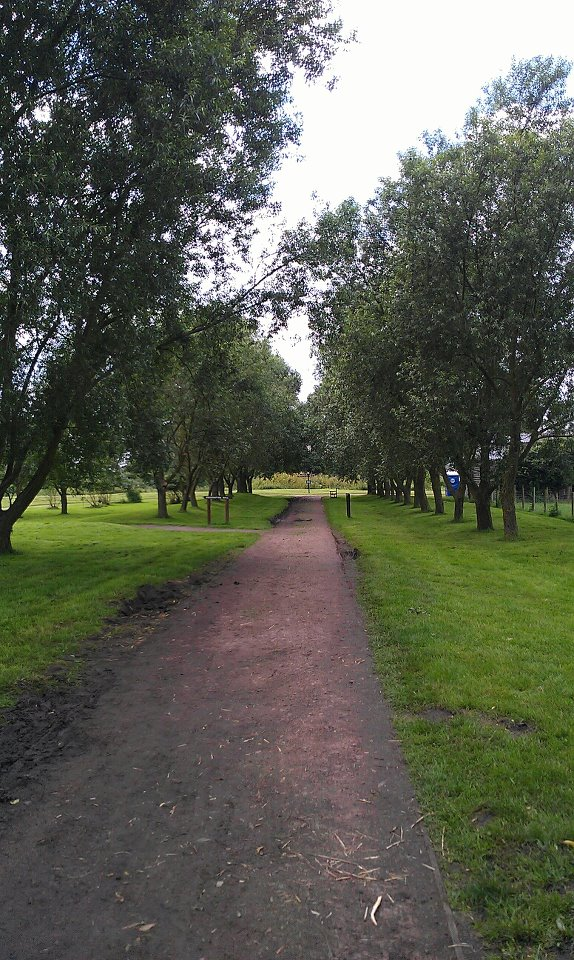
The Roman road running through Flag Fen

== See also ==
- Peterborough ware
