= Coates, Cambridgeshire =

Village in Cambridgeshire, England

Coordinates: 52.56°N 0.07°W

Coates
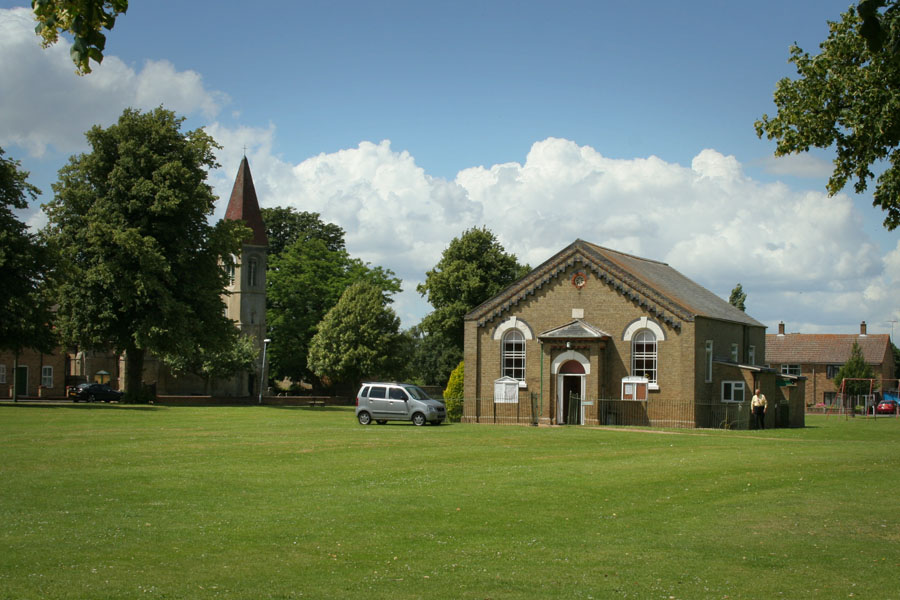
- North Green, Coates

- Location within Cambridgeshire
- OS grid reference: TL308975
- Civil parish: Whittlesey
- District: Fenland
- Shire county: Cambridgeshire
- Region: East
- Country: England
- Sovereign state: United Kingdom
- Post town: Peterborough
- Postcode district: PE7
- Dialling code: 01733
- Police: Cambridgeshire
- Fire: Cambridgeshire
- Ambulance: East of England

Coates is a small village close to the town of Whittlesey, in the English county of Cambridgeshire. Coates has a shop which includes a post office.

== Description ==
The village has two greens, North Green and South Green, which are divided by the A605 road, which runs through the village. There is a small shop which includes a post office and There is also a Co Op which opened July 2025. Coates has a church, a village hall and a primary school. Local businesses include a Chinese takeaway (Lucky House), two pubs (The Carpenters Arms and The Vine), a violin shop (Simon Watkin Violins), a manufacturer of window blinds housed in the former chapel on North Green, and a number of farms. It also has a war memorial on North Green. The village has its own fishing lake. It was awarded Fenland's best kept village in 1993. It is famous for its Petanque competitions as people from different countries such as the Netherlands and Austria come to compete. There is a well supported traditional annual Village Show.

== History ==
The origins of the name are from the word 'Cotes', a corruption of cottages. The village is referred to on ancient maps as 'Moreton's Cotes', with reference to Bishop Morton.

=== Churches ===
The Anglican church of the Holy Trinity was designed by architect James Wild in a brick interpretation of the Norman style and built in 1840.

The Methodist church on the North Green opened in the early 1840s, but closed in August 2012 when it faced £100,000 refurbishment costs. It was subsequently bought by a company that manufactures blinds.

== Recent events ==
Part of the filming for the 2007 war film Atonement starring Keira Knightley was filmed outside Coates at the end of Eldernell Lane.
