= List of churches in Fenland =

The following is a list of churches in Fenland, a local government district in Cambridgeshire, England.

== Map of medieval parish churches ==
=== Cambridgeshire ===
Medieval parish churches in Cambridgeshire

=== Central Cambridge ===
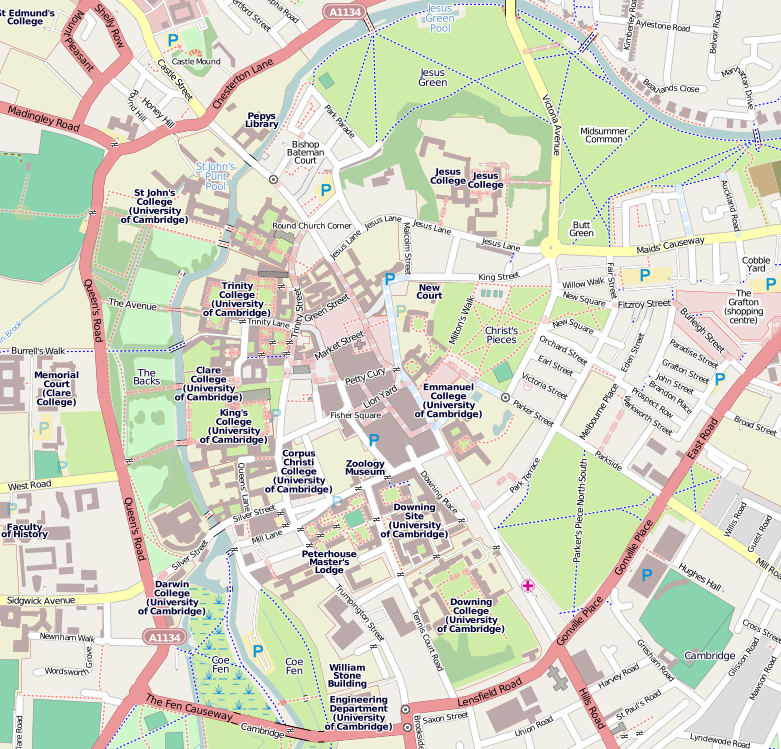
Medieval parish churches in Cambridge Central

== Active churches ==
There are churches in every civil parish. The district has an estimated 52 active churches for 100,200 inhabitants, a ratio of one church to every 1,927 people.

Name	Civil parish	Web	Dedication	Founded	Denomination	Benefice	Notes
Benwick Church	Benwick			2012	Church of England	Six Fen Churches	Church room as extension to village hall. See entry below
SS Peter & Paul, Chatteris	Chatteris		Peter & Paul	Medieval	Church of England		
Chatteris Catholic Meeting	Chatteris				Roman Catholic	March Parish	Meets in Anglican church for weekly masses
Emmanuel Church Chatteris	Chatteris		Jesus		BU / Meth / URC	Ely & Newmarket Methodist Circuit	1990 merger of Baptist, Methodist and URC churches
Chatteris Community Church	Chatteris			2010-2012	Grace Baptist		
Chatteris Salvation Army	Chatteris				Salvation Army		
Christ Church, Christchurch	Christchurch		Jesus	1864	Church of England	Six Fen Churches	Benefice also includes Welney church in Norfolk
St Mary, Doddington	Doddington		Mary	Medieval	Church of England	Six Fen Churches	
Doddington Methodist Church	Doddington				Methodist	The Fens Methodist Circuit	
All Saints, Elm	Elm		All Saints	Medieval	Church of England	Elm, Emneth, Friday Bridge	Benefice also includes Emneth church in Norfolk
St Mark, Friday Bridge	Elm (Friday Bridge)		Mark	1864	Church of England	Elm, Emneth, Friday Bridge	
St Paul, Gorefield	Gorefield		Paul	1870	Church of England	Wisbech St Mary, Gorefield, Southea	
St Leonard, Leverington	Leverington		Leonard of Noblac	Medieval	Church of England	Leverington, Newton, Tydd	
St Nicolas, Manea	Manea		Nicholas	pre-1791	Church of England	Six Fen Churches	Rebuilt 1791, 1875. Chapel of ease to Coveney until 1875.
Manea Methodist Church	Manea				Methodist	The Fens Methodist Circuit	
St Wendreda, March	March		Wendreda	Medieval	Church of England	March Team	
St Peter, March	March		Peter	1880	Church of England	March Team	
St John the Evangelist, March	March		John the Evangelist	1872	Church of England	March Team	
St Mary Magdalene, March	March (Westry)		Mary Magdalene	1873	Church of England	March Team	
Our Lady of Good Counsel & St Peter, March	March		Mary & Peter	1911	Roman Catholic	March Parish	
Centenary Baptist Church, March	March			1700	Baptist Union		
Providence Baptist Church, March	March				Grace Baptist		Rebuilt 1873
Trinity Church March	March		Trinity		Methodist / URC	The Fens Methodist Circuit	1980s merger of two Methodist churches and one URC
Elim March Community Church	March				Elim		
March Evangelical Fellowship	March				?		
Fenland Community Church	March				?		Centres on the needs of people with learning difficulties.
St James, Newton-in-the-Isle	Newton-in-the-Isle		James	Medieval	Church of England	Leverington, Newton, Tydd	
Emmanuel, Southea	Parson Drove		Jesus	1873	Church of England	Wisbech St Mary, Gorefield, Southea	
St Mark's Methodist Church, Parson Drove	Parson Drove		Mark		Methodist	The Fens Methodist Circuit	
Murrow Methodist Church	Parson Drove (Murrow)				Methodist	The Fens Methodist Circuit	
St Giles, Tydd St Giles	Tydd St Giles		Giles	Medieval	Church of England	Leverington, Newton, Tydd	
Tydd St Giles Methodist Church	Tydd St Giles				Methodist	The Fens Methodist Circuit	
St Mary, Whittlesey	Whittlesey		Mary	Medieval	Church of England	Whittlesey, Pondersbridge, Coates	
St Andrew, Whittlesey	Whittlesey		Andrew	Medieval	Church of England	Whittlesey, Pondersbridge, Coates	Benefice also includes Pondersbridge church in Hunt'shire.
Holy Trinity, Coates	Whittlesey (Coates)		Trinity	1839-1840	Church of England	Whittlesey, Pondersbridge, Coates	
St Jude the Apostle, Whittlesey	Whittlesey		Jude		Roman Catholic	Whittlesey & Ramsey Parish	Parish also includes Ramsey in Huntingdonshire
Whittlesey Baptist Church	Whittlesey			1769	Grace Baptist		
Whittlesey Queen Street Church	Whittlesey			C19th	Methodist / URC	Peterborough Methodist Circuit	URC closed and amalgamated with Methodists 1993
Whittlesey Salvation Army	Whittlesey				Salvation Army		
Whittlesey Christian Church	Whittlesey				?		
St Peter, Wimblington	Wimblington		Peter	1874	Church of England	Six Fen Churches	
Wimblington Methodist Church	Wimblington				Methodist	The Fens Methodist Circuit	
SS Peter & Paul, Wisbech	Wisbech		Peter & Paul	Medieval	Church of England		
St Augustine, Wisbech	Wisbech		Augustine of Canterbury	1868	Church of England		
Our Lady & St Charles Borromeo, Wisbech	Wisbech		Mary, Charles Borromeo	1840	Roman Catholic		
Wisbech Baptist Church	Wisbech			C17th	Baptist Union		1961 merger of General and Particular Baptist churches
Trinity Methodist Church, Wisbech	Wisbech		Trinity		Methodist	The Fens Methodist Circuit	Current building 1969
Castle Square URC, Wisbech	Wisbech				United Reformed		
Wisbech Salvation Army	Wisbech				Salvation Army		
Wisbech Quaker Meeting	Wisbech				Quakers		
The Kings Church, Wisbech	Wisbech			1984	Independent		
St Mary, Wisbech St Mary	Wisbech St Mary		Mary	Medieval	Church of England	Wisbech St Mary, Gorefield, Southea	

== Defunct churches ==
Name	Civil parish	Dedication	Founded	Redundant	Denomination	Notes
St Mary, Benwick	Benwick	Mary	1850-1854	1980	Church of England	Demolished 1985
St Etheldreda, Coldham	Elm (Coldham)	Æthelthryth	1876		Church of England	Sold as house before 2008
Guyhirn Chapel	Wisbech St Mary (Guyhirn)		1660	1960	Church of England	Churches Conservation Trust
St Mary Magdalene, Guyhirn	Wisbech St Mary (Guyhirn)	Mary Magdalene	1878		Church of England	Sold for conversion before 2012
St John the Baptist, Parson Drove	Parson Drove	John the Baptist	Medieval	1974	Church of England	Parish church 1870. Churches Conservation Trust
Corpus Christi, Murrow	Parson Drove (Murrow)	Corpus Christi	1857	c. 2005	Church of England	Now a house
