= Timothy W. Potter =

- Born: Timothy William Potter; 6 July 1944
- Died: 11 January 2000 (aged 55)
- Education: Trinity College, Cambridge
- Known for: South Etruria Survey; The Changing Landscape of South Etruria; the Thetford Treasure; excavations at Stonea
- Spouse: Sandra Caroline Bailey (m. 1985)
- Children: 2
- Scientific career
- Fields: Archaeology
- Workplaces: Lancaster University; British Museum; British School at Rome
- Thesis: The Archaeological Topography of the Central and Southern Ager Faliscus (1974)

Timothy William Potter (6 July 1944 – 11 January 2000) was an archaeologist of ancient Italy, as well as of Roman Britain, best known for his focus on landscape archaeology.

Potter was educated at March Grammar School in March, Cambridgeshire, where his father Cedric Potter was headmaster. He followed his brother Christopher to Trinity College, Cambridge, where he read anthropology and archaeology, graduating with a 2:1 in 1966 and obtained his Ph.D. in 1974; his Ph.D. thesis was entitled Archaeological Topography of the Central and Southern Ager Faliscus. In the 1980s Potter excavated at Stonea, a Roman settlement in the fens of Cambridgeshire.

Potter was a student of John Bryan Ward-Perkins and a member of the South Etruria Survey conducted by the British School at Rome. As part of the survey Potter worked on the Ager Faliscus leading to two influential books, A Faliscan Town in South Etruria: Excavations at Narce 1966-71 (1976) and The changing landscape of South Etruria (1979). The survey also led to his important excavations at Monte Gelato (1986-1990) and Narce (1966-1971). Potter also authored a popular course textbook entitled Roman Italy (1987) as part of the Exploring Roman World series published by British Museum Publishing. Together with Catherine Johns, he also wrote the Roman Britain title in the series.

Potter taught at the University of Lancaster (1973-1978) where he instituted a new archaeology program. In 1978 he moved to the British Museum and their department of Prehistoric and Romano-British Antiquities, serving as assistant keeper from 1978 to 1995 and keeper from 1995 until his death.

== Bibliography ==
- "Excavations in the Medieval Centre of Mazzano Romano", in Papers of the British School at Rome 40, p. 135-45 (1972).
- A Faliscan Town in South Etruria: Excavations at Narce 1966-71 (1976).
- Romans in north-west England: excavations at the Roman forts of Ravenglass, Watercrook and Bownes (1979).
- The Changing Landscapes of South Etruria (1979).
- Una stipe votiva da Ponte di Nona (1989). https://www.worldcat.org/title/22727273
- Towns in late antiquity (1995).
- Jackson Ralph and T. W Potter. 1996. Excavations at Stonea Cambridgeshire 1980–85. London: Published for the Trustees of the British Museum by British Museum Press.
- and A. King. Excavation of the mola di Monte Gelato: a Roman and Medieval settlement in South Etruria (1997).
- and Catherine Johns. Roman Britain (2002).

== Necrology ==
- Necrology by Stephen L. Dyson in American Journal of Archaeology 104.3 (July 2000) 589–90.
- Necrology by Federico Marazzi in Archeologia Medievale 27 (2000) 435–8.
- Obituary - Timothy William Potter, MA, PhD - Society of Antiquaries of London
