= Chettisham railway station =

Disused railway station in Cambridgeshire, England

Chettisham
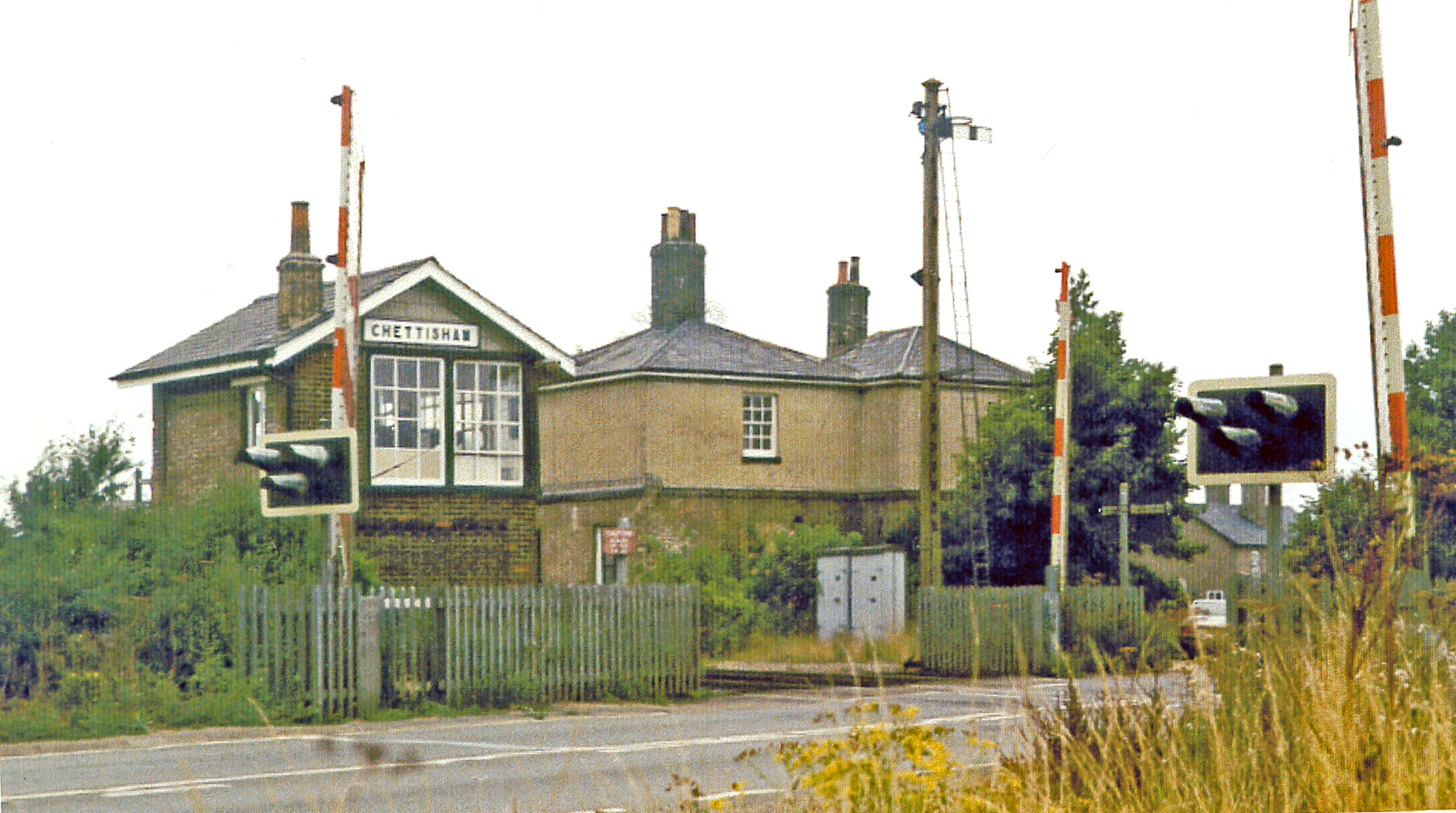
- Remains in 1983

General information
- Location: Chettisham, East Cambridgeshire; England
- Coordinates: 52.4269°N 0.2782°E
- Grid reference: TL550834
- Platforms: 2

Other information
- Status: Disused

History
- Original company: Eastern Counties Railway
- Pre-grouping: Great Eastern Railway
- Post-grouping: London and North Eastern Railway

Key dates
- 14 January 1847: Opened as Chittisham
- 1 August 1901: Renamed Chettisham
- 13 June 1960: Closed for passengers
- 13 July 1964: closed for freight
Location

Chettisham railway station is a former railway station in Chettisham, Cambridgeshire. It was on the Great Eastern Railway route between Ely and March. Although the station closed for passengers in 1960, the line is still in use.

== History ==
The Eastern Counties Railway (ECR) opened their line from Ely to March and Peterborough on 14 January 1847. The ECR was amalgamated with other railways in 1862 to form the Great Eastern Railway. The station was originally named Chittisham; it was renamed Chettisham on 1 August 1901.

The station closed to passengers on 13 June 1960 but was briefly reopened with temporary platforms as "Ely Temporary Station" in 1991–2 while Ely Station was being renovated in connection with the electrification of the main line from Cambridge to King's Lynn

Preceding station	Historical railways	Following station
Black Bank; Line open, station closed	Great Eastern Railway	Ely; Line and station open
