= Richard Davis (astronomer) =

Richard Davis OBE, FRAS
- Born: Richard John Davis; 28 June 1949; March, England
- Died: 2 May 2016 (aged 66); Royal Hallamshire Hospital, Sheffield, England
- Education: March Grammar School for boys
- Alma mater: University of Cambridge; University of Manchester
- Occupation: Radio astronomer

Richard John Davis (28 June 1949 – 2 May 2016) was a radio astronomer for the Jodrell Bank Centre for Astrophysics at the University of Manchester.

== Personal life ==
Davis was born in March, Cambridgeshire, England, the first child of Hugh Davis, a railway man, and Thelma Carter. He had a brother, architect Christopher Davis, and Richard had two sons, William and Anthony. After falling ill in Italy, he died on 2 May 2016, aged 66, at the Royal Hallamshire Hospital. His funeral took place at St Paul's Church, Macclesfield, on 25 May 2016.

== Education ==
Davis attended March Grammar School for boys in 1960–67. He won a scholarship to attend Downing College at the University of Cambridge in 1968, where he studied the natural sciences, focusing on theoretical physics, for his undergraduate degree. He started an MSc in radio astronomy at Jodrell Bank in 1971, graduating with a diploma in 1972, followed by a PhD, also at Jodrell Bank, on the radio polarisation of quasars, graduating in 1975.

== Career ==
Following from his PhD, he became an academic staff member at Jodrell in 1978, and over the course of 45 years he was involved in teaching, research, technical development at Jodrell Bank. Undergraduate teaching across physics and astrophysics, as well as supervising postgraduate students.

In 2011 he was made an Officer of the Order of the British Empire (OBE) for services to science.

He was a member of the Royal Astronomical Society Council in 2012–2015.

== Research ==
Davis designed electronics to use the radio-linked Mark II and Mark III telescopes as Jodrell Bank's first phase-stable radio interforemeter, over a distance of 24 kilometres (15 mi). This was used to measure radio source positions to an accuracy of 100 milliarcseconds; it also enabled longer observation times on sources than before, which led to the measurement of radio emission from Cygnus A's parent galaxy.

In the late 1970s he worked on radio links for MERLIN. At the same time he worked with Bernard Lovell and Ralph Spencer on observations of red dwarf flare stars using the Lovell Telescope (then the Mark I) and the Defford 25 metres (82 ft) telescope as an interferometer, which led to an unambiguous detection of YZ Canis Minoris at radio frequencies. He developed a 5 GHz broadband interferometer using the Lovell and Mark II telescopes, with his then-student Steve Padin, detecting radio emission from symbiotic stars and novae. He studied 3C 273 in the 1980s and 1990s.

Davis was Project Scientist for MERLIN, the 32 m (105 ft) telescope at Cambridge, and the upgrades of the Lovell Telescope.

Davis studied the cosmic microwave background with the Very Small Array and the Planck satellite. He was the UK PI of Planck's Low Frequency Instrument, leading the development and construction of the 30 and 44 GHz low-noise amplifiers, as well as leading the UK post-launch support for the instrument. He spent over 15 years working on the Planck satellite.

He authored over 150 scientific publications.
