= Neale-Wade Academy =

Location
- Wimblington Road; March, Cambridgeshire, PE15 9PX; England
- 52.5372°N 0.0886°E

Information
- Type: Academy
- Established: 17th century (grammar school); 1969; 1983 (mergers); 2013 (academy)
- Department for Education URN: 139272 Tables
- Ofsted: Reports
- Principal: Graham Horn
- Gender: Co-educational
- Age: 11 to 19
- Enrolment: 1425
- Website: www.neale-wade.org

Neale-Wade Academy (formerly Neale-Wade Community College) is a secondary school and sixth form with academy status in the market town of March, Cambridgeshire, England. As with many state schools, the current school was the product of a merger of a grammar school and a comprehensive school. The merged school has since grown to be Fenland's largest secondary school. It was designated Mathematics & Computing specialist status in 2005, and gained academy status in 2013.

The current head teacher is Graham Horn who started his role there in 2020.

== History ==
=== March Grammar School ===
The college can trace its history back to 1696 when William Neale left an estate, the income of which was to help educate 8 poor boys. In 1717, Henry Wade left £20 per annum to pay for a schoolmaster to teach 20 poor children of the Parish. These two bequests were the origin of what eventually became March Grammar School. School premises were built on Station Road in 1876 and the school stayed there until a new site was opened on Wimblington Road in 1964. The Old Boys and Masters of the school who gave their lives during the two World Wars are commemorated on plaques which are displayed in the current college's main hall.

=== Other schools ===
Hereward School was founded in 1934 due to the need for another senior school in the town. It turned fully comprehensive in 1969.

March High School for Girls was the local girls' grammar school. It was founded in 1907 to complement the boys-only March Grammar. The schools merged in 1969.

=== Neale-Wade ===
The existing College site was established in the 1964 for the Grammar School. Around this time, the tripartite system was being phased out and many grammar or selective state schools were being merged with secondary modern schools. March Grammar and March High merged in 1969 to form Neale-Wade School. In 1983, after a great deal of debate and considerable building, the Neale-Wade merged with Hereward School to form a new comprehensive on the Neale-Wade site. It was agreed to keep the Neale-Wade name while designating the School a "Community College".

After the March 2012 inspection, the college was placed into special measures by Ofsted but made progress under new principal Jason Wing, for which he was commended by inspectors in a follow-up report.

In early November 2012, the school held meetings with parents and the community to discuss the possibility of converting into an academy. The college became Neale-Wade Academy, an Active Learning Trust school on 1 April 2013.

== Description ==
This is an academy with sixth-form. It operates a two-week timetable which runs for 50 hours. Students are taught in mixed ability groups for all subjects except English and Maths in Year 7 and English, Maths and Science in Year 8.

There is a two-year Key Stage 3 where students follow the National Curriculum, and a three-year Key Stage 4 where students study four Level 2 qualifications. All students take a sport based qualification during PE. The separate sciences are also available for the more able students, double language French, Spanish is possible.

In the sixth form students are offered a combination of Level 3 Academic, Applied General and Tech Level Qualifications over the two years. There is an enrichment programme which includes both qualifications and non-qualification activities. GCSE Mathematics and GCSE English are available for those students who do not hold a Grade 4 or above. All Year 12 students follow a planned careers education programme which includes a work placement. The programme consists of a minimum of three A levels or Applied General or Tech Level qualifications of 10 hours per fortnight teaching time plus one hour timetabled independent learning each. These are chosen the from four option blocks.

== Former pupils ==
The March Grammar School Old Boys Association was founded in 1919 as its alumni association. In July 1919 a cricket match was organised between the ‘March Grammar School Old Boys’ and the masters and boys of the school to raise funds for a memorial to commemorate former pupils and staff who had been killed in the war. This cricket match marked the beginning of old boys associationwhich in 2007 changed its name to March Grammar and Neale-Wade Former Students Association to include former pupils of the current Neale-Wade Community College. In 2019 the Association changed its name to The Neale-Wade Association. http://www.nealewade.org

On 28 June 2019 the Association held its 100th reunion and to commemorate this milestone a cricket match between a team from March and Marylebone Cricket Club (MCC) took place at March Town Cricket Club.

=== March Grammar School ===
- Stewart Adams OBE (1923 – 2019), chemist who developed Ibuprofen
- Brian Corby, child protection expert and author
- Richard Davis OBE, FRAS (1949 – 2016) radio astronomer
- Timothy W. Potter, archaeologist

=== Neale-Wade ===
- Louise Hazel, heptathlete
- Dominic Mohan, editor of The Sun
- Jason Wing, Olympic bobsledder and former principal
