= Dunhams Wood =

Woodland in Cambridgeshire, England

Coordinates: 52.556383°N 0.128153°E

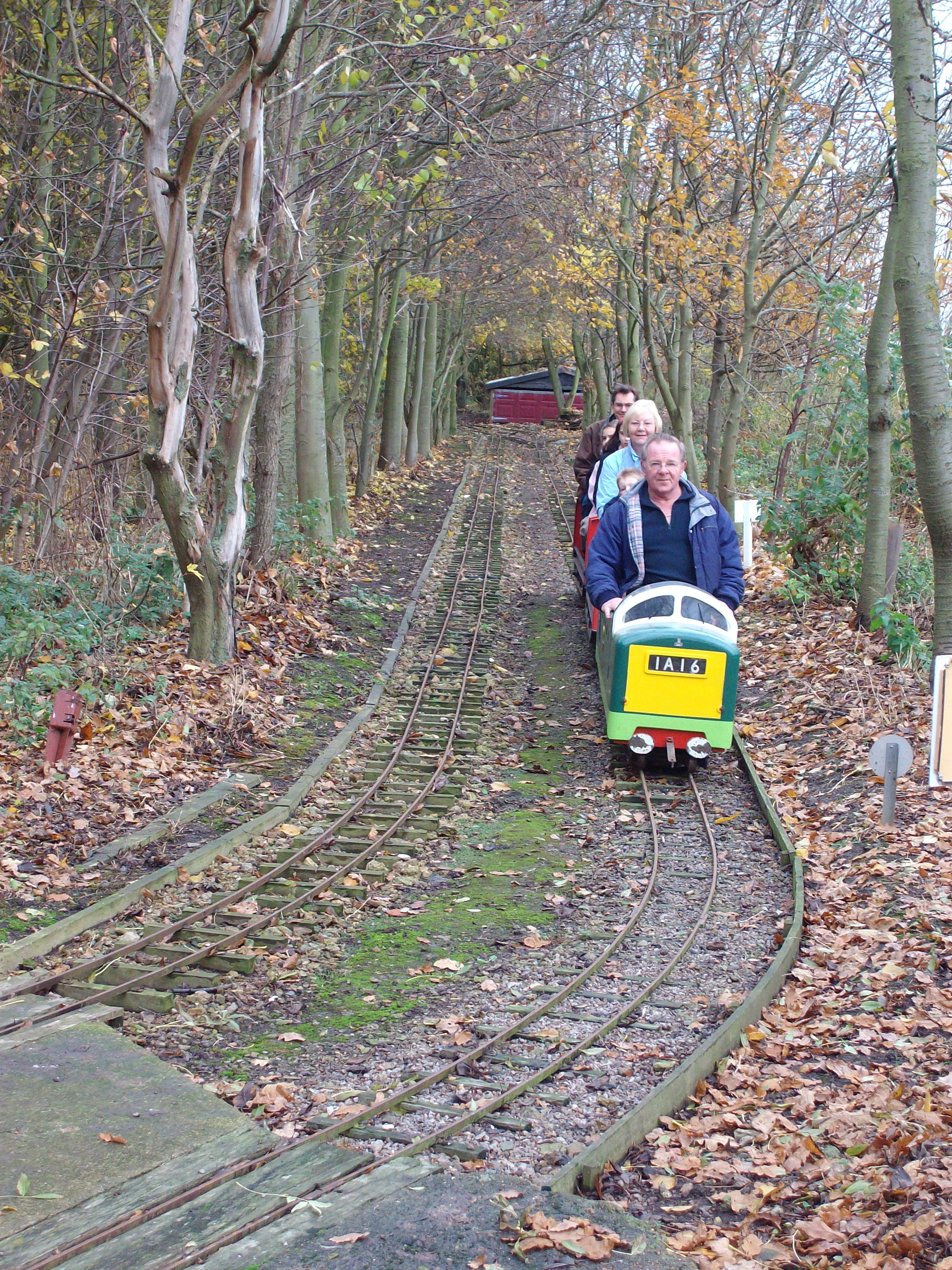

Dunhams Wood is a privately owned broadleaved woodland that is occasionally open to the public. The area was planted over a period of 6 years starting in 1985. It is located approximately 2 miles (3 km) outside March, Cambridgeshire in Fenland.

The area was initially owned by Margaret and Arthur Dunham, who opened the woodlands to the public during the summer. Treasure hunts and other games took place within the wood. A major feature of the wood is the Dunhams Wood Railway. There is a miniature railroad at 7.25-inch (184 mm) gauge with approximately 800 yards (730 m) of track that snakes through the woodland.

The woodland has also been used as a venue for various events including wildlife viewing, photography and archery. Margaret and Arthur Dunham were interviewed for the BBC Radio 4 programme Breakfast with a Farmer in 1992.

Following the death of Arthur Dunham on 13 January 2013, the woodland was closed to the public and offered for sale. It was sold in August 2014. Although the railway remains in the wood,
