= Elm, Cambridgeshire =

Village in Cambridgeshire, England

Coordinates: 52.63°N 0.18°E

Elm
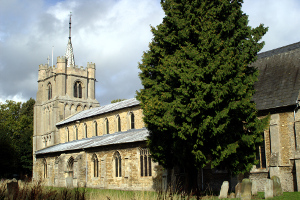
- All Saints Church, Elm

- Location within Cambridgeshire
- Population: 3,962 (2011)
- OS grid reference: TF477062
- District: Fenland
- Shire county: Cambridgeshire
- Region: East
- Country: England
- Sovereign state: United Kingdom
- Post town: Wisbech
- Postcode district: PE14
- Dialling code: 01945
- Police: Cambridgeshire
- Fire: Cambridgeshire
- Ambulance: East of England
- UK Parliament: North East Cambridgeshire

Elm is a village and civil parish in the Fenland District of Cambridgeshire, England. In Domesday, it is called Helle.

The village is about 1 1/2 miles or 2 1/2 km south of the market town of Wisbech, immediately to the south of the Wisbech by-pass. The county boundary with Norfolk is immediately to the north and north-east. The northern part of Elm village, at Elm Low Road, acts as a suburb of Wisbech. Most of the village straddles the B1101 road, which meanders its way between Wisbech and March.

The civil parish had a resident population of 3,295, as recorded during the 2001 United Kingdom census. The population including Coldham, Collett's Bridge, Friday Bridge and Ring's End was 3,962 at the 2011 Census.

== History ==
=== Prehistoric ===
Situated in the Fens, much of the parish would have been undrained salt marsh and salt lagoon, with any higher areas, such as that around Wisbech, forming fen-islands. Mesolithic hunter-gatherers would have fished and hunted waterfowl from these islands. Later, farmers would have grazed their sheep and other livestock on the marsh pastures. Scatters of worked flints have been found at Coldham and other sites.

=== Roman period ===
The area was occupied during the Roman period, with domestic finds scattered through the parish, concentrating along the Leam stream, which may have been canalised during the Roman period. Apart from agriculture, there is archaeological evidence of salt processing in the Elm area.

=== Medieval period ===
The Great Hey or High Fen was common to the vills of Elm, Leverington, Newton, Wisbech, Outwell, Upwell and Tydd St Giles. Drainage and falling sea levels may have prompted the settlement of Elm by the medieval period. In the 13th century the parish was prosperous enough to fund the building of a significant church.

=== Modern period ===
The lower-lying parts of the parish were probably not fully drained and reclaimed until as recently as the 17th to 19th centuries. Later satellite settlements formed to the south of the parish at Friday Bridge and at Coldham, alongside the Leam, where land was better drained.

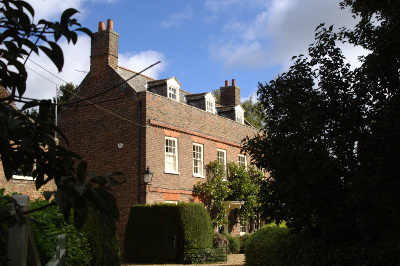
The Limes, 18th-century farmhouse in Elm, Cambridgeshire

Elm, or Elme, once had a stop on the Wisbech and Upwell Tramway, known as Elmbridge as it was just over the boundary in Norfolk near to a bridge that spanned the former Wisbech Canal. There were passenger stations serving the parish: Coldham for Pear Tree Hill, on the March–Wisbech line (1847), and Guyhirn on the March–Spalding line (1867).

The canal connected the River Nene at Wisbech to a junction with the Well Creek and the Old River Nene at Outwell, and passed along the northern edge of Elm.

The canal was abandoned, and finally filled in during the 1970s. Parts of it have been converted into a public green lane that starts at the post office, and terminates at the site of Collets Bridge. The tramway that ran alongside the canal was in turn closed to passengers from 1927. It discontinued as a line in 1966.

Besides allotments and market-gardening, a number of apple, pear, and plum orchards have been planted on the better-drained soils close to the village centre in the north of the parish, while the lower-lying peat soils further out are cultivated as high grade arable land. The orchards (some of which have since been replaced by new housing developments) used to attract fruit pickers from London on working holidays. After the Second World War, many of these seasonal visitors would stay at a disused POW camp at Friday Bridge. Today the camp is used mainly by seasonal agricultural workers, including some from abroad.

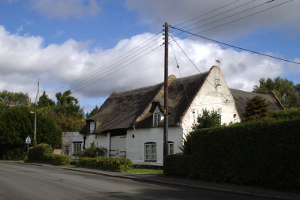
Thatched farmhouse in the village

A stream, known as The Leam, once flowed from March to Wisbech, past the church, and through the village. This stream has now been drained away, and only survives today as a pond to the south of Elm, at Friday Bridge. In 2018, Elm parish council ordered the removal of bulrushes from the pond.

== Community facilities ==
Elm's facilities include a primary school, a post office, a local shop, butchers, hairdressers, garages, and two public houses - The Sportsman and the Elm Tree inn. A bus service stops in Elm, running between Wisbech and March. The nearest railway station is at March. National Cycle Network 63 from Wisbech to Burton on Trent, passes directly through the village.

== Landmarks ==
The parish church is a large needle-spired, stone building, mainly of Early English 13th-century origin, and is dedicated to All Saints. The church is a Grade I listed building.

Other notable local buildings include the Grade II listed Elm House, that has been dated to 1630, and the Sportsman public house, two of nearly two dozen listed buildings in the parish.

== Notable people ==
- Rev. Henry Jackson, Vicar of Wisbech St Mary. He died on 24 March 1863. He left £150 for the erection of a drinking fountain in Wisbech, £100 for a stained glass window in Wisbech church and £200 for a coloured window in Elm church.
- Thomas Aveling (1824–1882), a pioneering agricultural engineer, was born in Elm on 11 September 1824 before moving to Hoo in Kent. He was the co-founder of Aveling and Porter which became the largest manufacturer of steam rollers in the world. Thomas Aveling died on 7 March 1882 and is buried in the churchyard at St Werburgh Church, Hoo.
