= Terry Woodgate =

English footballer

Personal information
- Full name: John Terence Woodgate
- Date of birth: 11 December 1919
- Place of birth: East Ham, Essex, England
- Date of death: 26 April 1985 (aged 65)
- Place of death: March, Cambridgeshire, England
- Position: Winger

Senior career*
Years	Team	Apps	(Gls)
1938–1954	West Ham United	259	(48)
1954–1955	Peterborough United	51	(15)
1955–????	March Town United		
- * Club domestic league appearances and goals as of 10:02, 17 March 2012 (UTC)

John Terence Woodgate (11 December 1919 – 26 April 1985) was an English footballer who played for West Ham United and Peterborough United as a winger.

Born in East Ham, Essex (now part of London), Woodgate was at home on either wing. He made his Second Division debut before World War II, against Bradford Park Avenue on 7 April 1939. During World War II Woodgate served with the Essex Regiment and the Royal Artillery. Woodgate gained a regular place in the Hammers team after the war and was ever-present during the 1950–51 season. He went on to make 275 appearances for the east London club, scoring 52 goals. He scored a hat-trick in seven minutes against Plymouth Argyle in 1946.

With emerging competition from Harry Hooper and Malcolm Musgrove, Woodgate left West Ham to join Peterborough United in March 1954. He subsequently played for March Town United.

After finishing his football career he became the landlord of the Cock Inn Public House in March, Cambridgeshire. Woodgate died 26 April 1985.
