= Stonea =

Hamlet in Cambridgeshire, England

Coordinates: 52.4751°N 0.1010°E

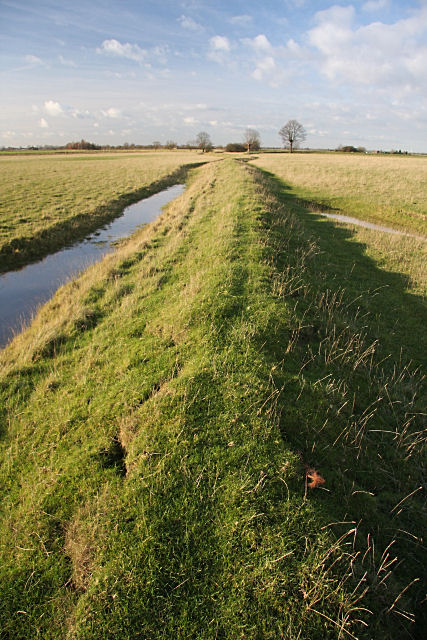
Stonea Camp bank and ditch

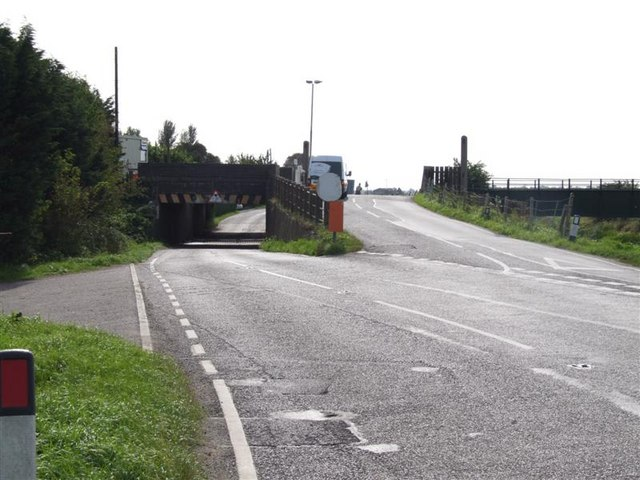
Railway bridge and underpass at Stonea

Stonea is a hamlet in Cambridgeshire, England, south east of March and part of the parish of Wimblington. Stonea today consists of a scattered collection of farmsteads and houses, the majority sited along Sixteen Foot Bank, a man-made river which forms part of the Middle Level Navigations. The largest settlement is on the bank near the Golden Lion pub. A former Primitive Methodist chapel is now a private residence.

This part of Stonea is dissected by a staffed railway crossing on the Ely to Peterborough Line; Stonea railway station closed in 1966. The underpass neighbouring the bridge (which provides a diversion avoiding the level crossing) is said to be the "most bashed rail bridge in Britain", with 33 truck and van strikes in one 12-month period.

== History ==
There has been human habitation in the area since at least 500 BC; Stonea Camp archaeological site is the lowest Iron Age hillfort in Britain. The site is thought to be the site of a battle in 47 AD mentioned by Tacitus, between the Iceni tribe and a Roman auxiliary force under governor Ostorius Scapula. A medieval farmhouse at Stitches Farm was demolished in 1973. The camp itself was ploughed over in the 1960s, but the filled-in ditches were restored to the bank formation by the British Museum and Cambridgeshire County Council in the 1980s. To prevent further damage by agriculture, the area is now designated as a scheduled monument and pocket park.

The remains of a multi-storey Roman tower have been excavated to the north of the Stonea Camp fortifications. The substantial foundations of the rectangular building suggest some height; at least three storeys are proposed. The building featured a hypocaust and had walls decorated with painted plaster. Architectural fragments include tiles and window glass. However, the tower was demolished ca 200 AD. The Roman settlement at Stonea may have been the establishment of a procurator, based in the tower and supervising the Roman draining of the fens. Alternatively it may have been planned as a town with a market and bureaucratic role.

== Film and television ==
Stonea has featured in TV dramas. In the 1980s an episode of Tales of the Unexpected, "The Flypaper", was filmed at Stonea.

In the 1990s, a Fay Weldon adaptation of Growing Rich, starring Martin Kemp and John Le Stride was filmed in Stonea and Chatteris.
