= Wentworth M. Johnson =

Canadian writer (born 1939)

Wentworth M Johnson
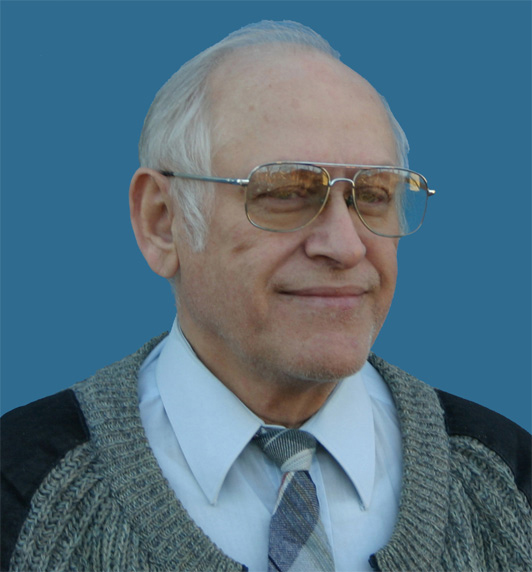
- Born: 7 October 1939; March, U.K.
- Died: 26 November 2014 (aged 75); Hamilton, Canada
- Writing career
- Genres: Mystery fiction Science fiction Nonfiction
- Website: wentworth-m-johnson.com

Wentworth M. Johnson (born 1939) is a Canadian writer. He was born in March, Cambridgeshire, England. W.M. Johnson is the great grandson of William Edward Bourne 1850-1925 (Playwright, dramatist and theatrical producer). Johnson has published newspaper and magazine articles, fiction and non-fiction books.

== Non-Series fiction books ==
- The Angel of the Vail (First Edition 1996, Second Edition 2021)
- Matthew 5 (2002 renamed The curse of Valdi in 2009)
- The Curse of Valdi (2009, Second Edition 2013)
- The Horror of Craigai (2003, Second Edition 2012)
- Imps of Willow Dell (2003, Second Edition 2011, Third Edition 2024)
- Through the Apple Store (2011, Second Edition 2024)
- Happisburgh High-jinks (2013, Updated 2025)
- Sideways Time — How I Discovered the Universe (2013, Updated 2024)
- The Beast of St John's Cove (2013, Updated 2024)
- The Dragon of Hope Island (2013, Updated 2024)
- Him's Paradox (First Edition 2024)

== Non-fiction books ==
- Signpost: The Guide to British Pubs (1990)
- Blood In The Streets — Murders In The City Of Hamilton (2013 renamed Steeltown Murders in 2024)
- Steeltown Murders — Murders In The City Of Hamilton(2024)

== Plays ==
- Victoriana — three plays from 1890s — Work and Wages — A Big Fortune — A London Mystery (Wentworth M Johnson, Pieter F. de Lang 2013)

== Series books ==
=== Daughters of the Sun Chronicles ===
1. Earthly Menace (First Edition 2004)
2. Arlon (First Edition 2004)
3. Virus (First Edition 2004)
4. Hypostasis Team (First Edition 2004)
5. Final Solution (First Edition 2004)

=== Bill Reyner Mystery Adventure Series ===
1. Fiend's Gold (First Edition 2001, Second Edition 2009, Third Edition 2013, Updated 2026)
2. Mania (First Edition 2002, Second Edition 2009, Third Edition 2013, Updated 2026)
3. Edinburgh Cuckoos (First Edition 2002, Second Edition 2009, Third Edition 2013, Updated 2026)
4. Damp Graves (First Edition 2002, Second Edition 2010, Third Edition 2013, Updated 2026)
5. Lions and Christians (First Edition 2002, Second Edition 2010, Third Edition 2013, Updated 2026)
6. The Canadian (First Edition 2010, Second Edition 2013, Updated 2026)
7. The Dutchman (First Edition 2010, Second Edition 2013, Updated 2026)
8. The Mermaid (First Edition 2011, Second Edition 2013, Updated 2026)
9. Magnuscarter (First Edition 24 April 2013, Second Edition 2021, Updated 2026)
10. The Agency (First Edition 26 February 2014, Updated 2026)

=== The Adventures of Two Special Animals ===
1. A Dual Tale (First Edition 2013, Updated 2024)
2. The Secret of Castle Duncan (First Edition 2013, Updated 2024)
3. Trouble at Castle Duncan (First Edition 2013, Updated 2024)
