= Manea railway station =

Railway station in Cambridgeshire, England

Coordinates: 52.498°N 0.178°E

Manea
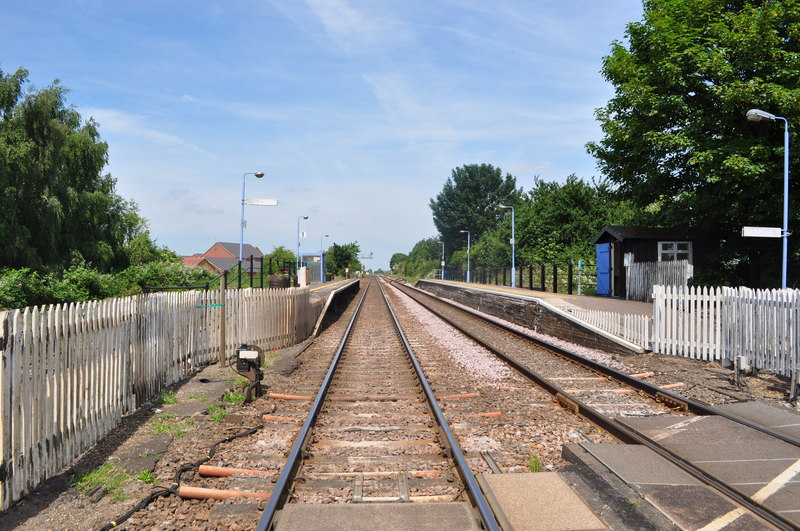
- A view of the two platforms

General information
- Location: Manea, Fenland; England
- Grid reference: TL479911
- Manager: Greater Anglia
- Platforms: 2

Other information
- Station code: MNE
- Classification: DfT category F2

Passengers
- 2021/22: ▲16,192
- 2022/23: ▲21,038
- 2023/24: ▲24,904
- 2024/25: ▲29,708
- 2025/26: ▼27,260
Location
Notes
- Passenger statistics from the Office of Rail and Road

Manea railway station /ˈmeɪniː/ is on the Ely–Peterborough line in the east of England and serves the village of Manea, Cambridgeshire. It is 80 miles 18 chains (129.1 km) measured from London Liverpool Street (via Clapton and Ely), and is situated between Ely and March stations.

== History ==
In 1966, the Minister of Transport Barbara Castle refused British Rail's request to close the station, although she did agree to the closure of the stations at Stonea and Bentley.

In August 2023, a new station car park was opened.

== Services ==
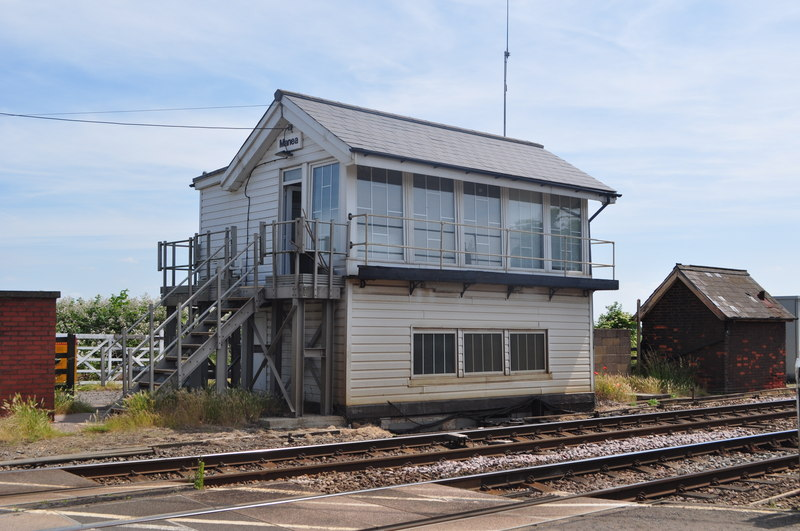
The signal box at Manea

On Mondays to Saturdays, Greater Anglia operates one train every two hours in each direction between Peterborough and Ipswich. These services use British Rail Class 755 bi-mode units.

There are seven trains per day (four towards Peterborough and three towards Cambridge) operated by CrossCountry on the Stansted Airport to Birmingham route. These use British Rail Class 170 diesel units.

Greater Anglia services stop at Manea on Sundays (twelve services a day, six each way). The first service is the 09:03 to Peterborough, the last is the 20:11 to Colchester via Ely and Ipswich.

The station has had an on-site ticket machine since late October 2018, situated on the south side of the line (next to the down line for trains travelling towards March and Peterborough).

Preceding station	National Rail	Following station
Ely	Greater Anglia Ipswich–Peterborough	March
Ely	CrossCountry Birmingham–Stansted Airport; Limited service	March
Historical railways
Stonea Line open, station closed	Great Eastern Railway Ely–Peterborough	Black Bank Line open, station closed
