= Coldham, Cambridgeshire =

Village in England

Coordinates: 52.6058°N 0.1175°E

Coldham
- Location within Cambridgeshire
- OS grid reference: TF434029
- District: Fenland
- Shire county: Cambridgeshire
- Region: East
- Country: England
- Sovereign state: United Kingdom
- Post town: Wisbech
- Postcode district: PE14
- Dialling code: 01945
- Police: Cambridgeshire
- Fire: Cambridgeshire
- Ambulance: East of England

Coldham is a hamlet in Elm civil parish, part of the Fenland district of the Isle of Ely, Cambridgeshire, England. Coldham is the site of a wind farm on a large farm estate of the Cooperative Group near the settlement.

== Church ==
Coldham, formerly known as "Pear Tree Hill", was formed as a separate ecclesiastical parish in 1874. The parish formerly had a church dedicated to St. Ethelreda built in 1876. This church was declared redundant in 2000 and has since been converted into a house. The former war memorial from the church is now located at St Mark's, Friday Bridge.

== Railway station ==
The settlement formerly had a railway station on the Great Eastern Railway, although there are proposals to reinstate a station as part of the Wisbech and March Bramley Line project.

== Notable people ==
Mrs E.B. Tanqueray, whose husband was Bertram Tanqueray, vicar of Coldham, wrote The Royal Quaker, a novel about Jane Stuart of Wisbech, published in 1904 by Methuen. A reviewer of the book wrote "It is high praise to say that "Royal Quaker," by Mrs. Bertram Tanqueray (Methuen), ranks with Mr. Quiller Couch's "Hetty Wesley"; inasmuch as both are studies in evangelical faith, founded on history and embroidered by fiction, and in each much of the charm consists in the skill with which the religious atmosphere of a bygone day has been reproduced in the printed page".
