= Norwood Road nature reserve =

Nature reserve in Cambridgeshire, England

Coordinates: 52.561825°N 0.089710°E

Norwood Road is a nature reserve managed by the Wildlife Trust for Bedfordshire, Cambridgeshire, Northamptonshire and Peterborough. It lies in the centre of the town of March in the county of Cambridgeshire.
