= Stonea Camp =

Hillfort in Cambridgeshire, England

Coordinates: 52.5165°N 0.1324°E

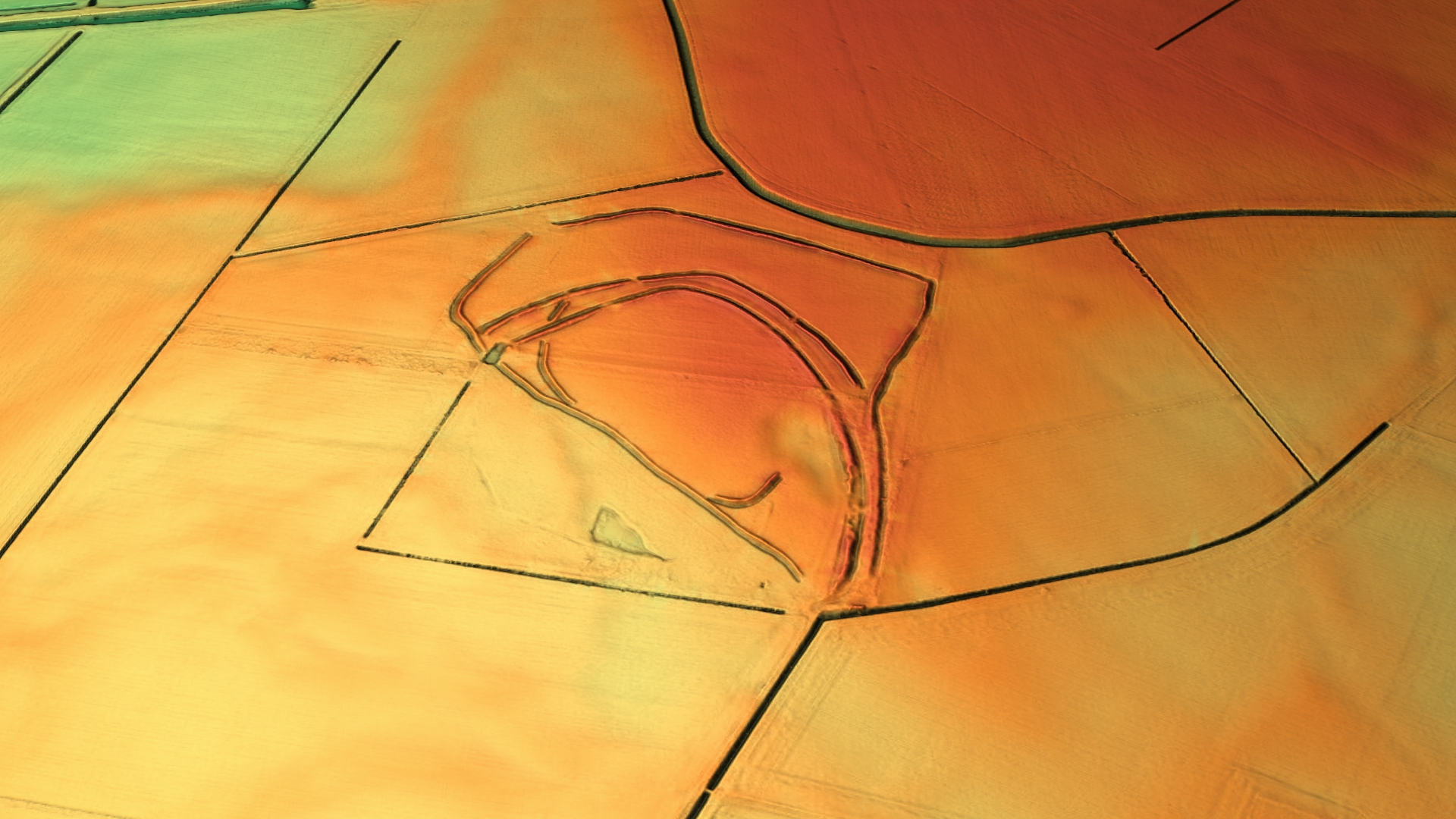
3D view of the digital terrain model

Stonea Camp is an Iron Age multivallate hill fort located at Stonea near March in the Cambridgeshire Fens. Situated on a gravel bank just 2 metres (6 ft 7 in) above sea-level, it is the lowest hill fort in Britain. Around 500 BC, when fortification is thought to have begun at this site, this "hill" would have provided a significant area of habitable land amidst the flooded marshes of the fens. The site exhibits at least two phases of development over several hundred years of settlement, with a D-shaped set of earth banks surrounded by a larger, more formal set of banks and ditches.

== Roman control ==
The fort is a possible site of the battle of 47 AD mentioned by Tacitus, between the Iceni tribe and a Roman auxiliary force under governor Ostorius Scapula. It has also been speculated that the remains relate to the campaign to subdue the Iceni after the Boudiccan Revolt. Human remains have been found around the site including sword-marked adult bones and the cleaved skull of a child, indicating that the inhabitants were trapped and attacked within the settlement.

The remains of a multi-storey Roman tower have also been excavated within sight to the north of the Stonea Camp fortifications. The building was possibly constructed to suppress further tribal rebellion or settlement at this site.

== Excavation and restoration ==
Excavation work was carried out in 1980 by the British Museum, and restoration work followed in 1991 to recover the outer bank system and ditches which had been worn away by agriculture. The Cambridgeshire County Council Archaeology department has continued to carry out restoration work at the site. To prevent further damage by agriculture, the area is now designated as a pocket park and scheduled ancient monument.

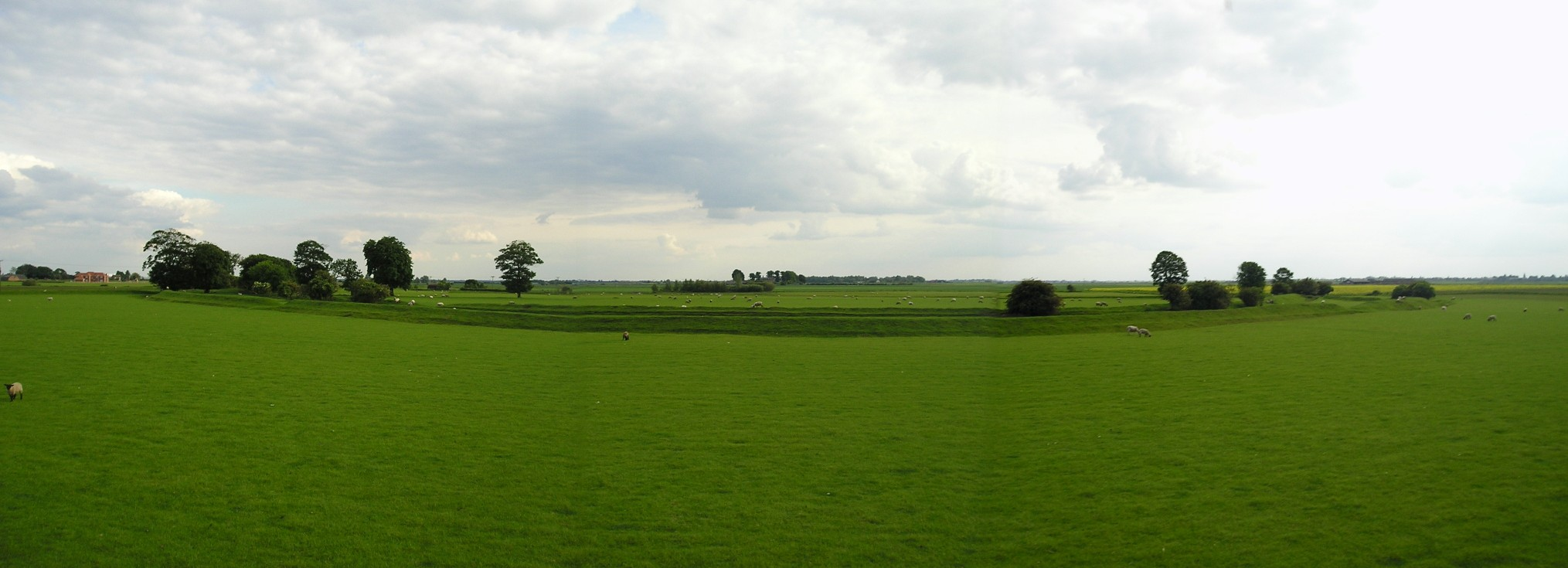
Stonea Camp panorama

== See also ==
- List of hillforts in England
