= Collett's Bridge =

Hamlet in Cambridgeshire, England

Coordinates: 52°38′06″N 0°11′28″E

- Location within Cambridgeshire
- Civil parish: Elm
- District: Fenland
- Shire county: Cambridgeshire
- Region: East
- Country: England
- Sovereign state: United Kingdom
- Police: Cambridgeshire
- Fire: Cambridgeshire
- Ambulance: East of England

Collett's Bridge is a hamlet within the civil parish of Elm, in the Isle of Ely, in the Fenland district, in the county of Cambridgeshire, England. It is situated on the eastern boundary of the district 1.5 miles east of Elm. It lies just off Gosmoor Lane, adjacent to the Wisbech/Littleport Road. (A1101).

The settlement, which is a small group of dwellings, lies alongside the former Wisbech Canal, filled in as a waste disposal site in the early 1970s, and the former tram railway between Wisbech and Upwell. In mid 1990 the housing stock numbered some 20 dwellings.
