= Stonea railway station =

Disused railway station in Cambridgeshire, England

Coordinates: 52.5180°N 0.1495°E

Stonea
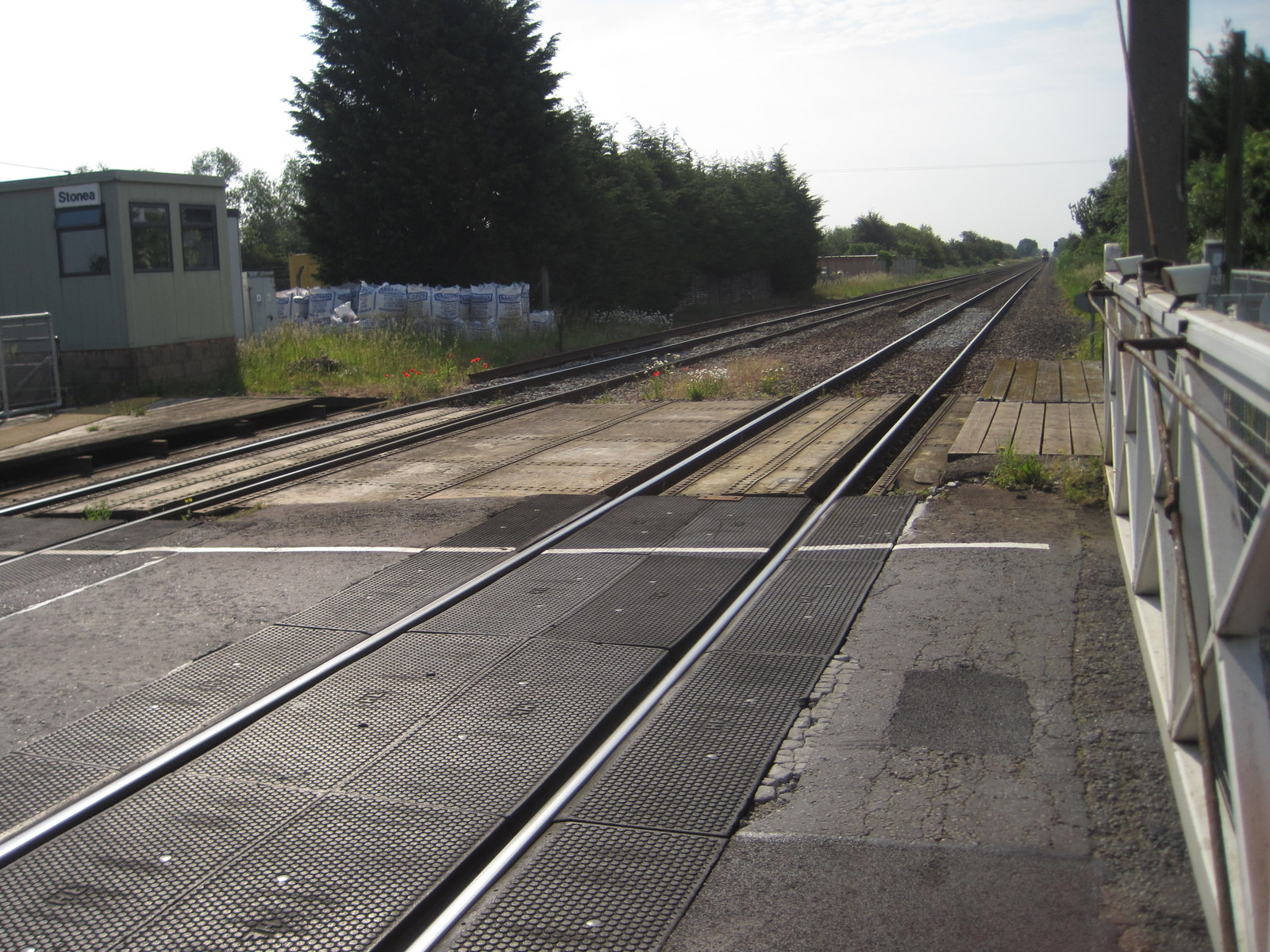
- The site of Stonea station in June 2015

General information
- Location: Stonea, Fenland; England
- Platforms: 2

Other information
- Status: Disused

History
- Original company: Eastern Counties Railway
- Pre-grouping: Great Eastern Railway
- Post-grouping: London and North Eastern Railway

Key dates
- 14 January 1847: Station opened
- 28 December 1964: Goods service ceased
- 7 November 1966: Station closed
Location

Stonea railway station is a former railway station serving the small village of Stonea, Cambridgeshire. Although the station closed in 1966, the line is still in use.

Preceding station	Historical railways	Following station
March	Great Eastern Railway	Manea
