= Black Bank railway station =

Disused railway station in Cambridgeshire, England

Coordinates: 52.44444°N 0.25299°E

Black Bank
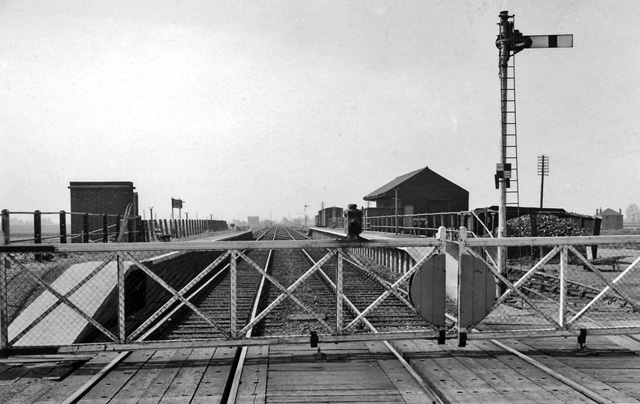
- View NW, towards March in 1963

General information
- Location: Little Downham, East Cambridgeshire; England
- Grid reference: TL532853
- Platforms: 2

Other information
- Status: Disused

History
- Original company: Eastern Counties Railway
- Pre-grouping: Great Eastern Railway
- Post-grouping: London and North Eastern Railway; Eastern Region of British Railways

Key dates
- 14 January 1847: Opened as Little Downham
- November 1853: Renamed Black Bank
- 17 June 1963: Closed to passengers
- 19 April 1965: Closed to goods
Location

Black Bank railway station was a railway station in Black Bank, Cambridgeshire which is now closed. The station platforms have been demolished but the goods shed still stands and remains in use. Although the station is closed, the line is still in use.

Former Services

Preceding station	Historical railways	Following station
Manea	Great Eastern Railway	Chettisham
