= March Town Hall =

Municipal building in March, Cambridgeshire, England

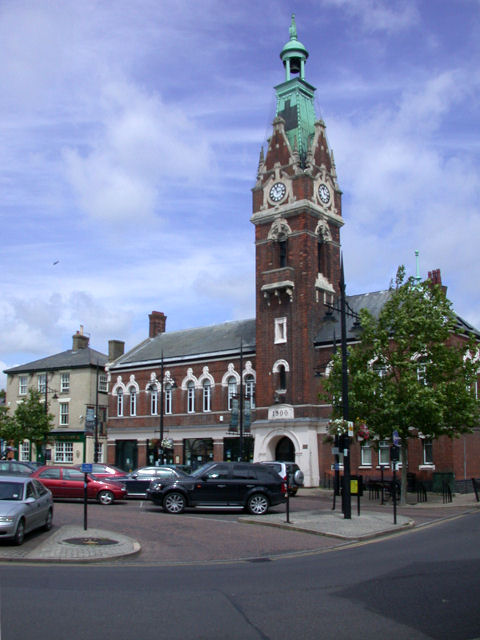
- March Town Hall

- Shown in Cambridgeshire
- 52.5493°N 0.0887°E
- Location: Market Square, March

History
- Built: 1900

Site notes
- Architect: W. T. Unwin
- Architectural style: Renaissance style

Listed Building – Grade II
- Official name: Town Hall
- Designated: 22 February 1985
- Reference no.: 1216349

March Town Hall is a municipal building in the Market Square in March, Cambridgeshire, England. The building, which was the headquarters of March Urban District Council, is a Grade II listed building.

== History ==
The first municipal building on the site was a market hall which was completed in 1831. It was arcaded on the ground floor so markets could be held with a meeting room on the first floor: the meeting room was initially used by the local school and then as the town surveyor's office.

Following significant population growth, largely associated with March's increasing importance as a market town, the area became an urban district in 1895. In this context the new civic leaders decided to purchase the old market hall, as well as the rights to hold markets, from the lord of the manor, Sir Algernon Francis Peyton, 6th Baronet, and to replace the old market hall with a new building on the same site.

The new building was designed by W. T. Unwin in the Renaissance style, built in red brick with stone dressings at a cost of £3,000 and was completed in 1900. It was originally described as a "Corn Exchange, offices etc". The design involved an asymmetrical main frontage with eight bays facing onto the Market Square. A 110 feet (34 m) high tower was erected in the bay to the right of the centre: it featured an arched doorway with a paired-pilaster surround in the first stage, a narrow round-headed window in the second stage, a French door and a balcony in the third stage, a clock in the fourth stage and, above that, there was a spire surmounted by a bell turret and a statue of Britannia. The left-hand section of four bays originally featured small sash windows on the ground floor and paired ogee-headed windows on the first floor, while the right-hand section of three bays featured small sash windows on the ground floor and single ogee-headed windows on the first floor. The clock, which was designed and manufactured by Sainsbury Brothers, was paid for by public subscription and installed to celebrate the Diamond Jubilee of Queen Victoria. The bells were recovered from the old market hall. Internally, the corn exchange was on the ground floor and the municipal offices were on the first floor. The ground floor was also converted to municipal use in 1912.

The town hall continued to serve as the headquarters of March Urban District Council for much of the 20th century but ceased being the local seat of government when the enlarged Fenland District Council was formed in 1974. The building was subsequently acquired by the Lord Chancellor's Department and was used a magistrates' court until court hearings were transferred to Wisbech in 1998. The building was acquired and refurbished by the March Civic Trust, with funding from a former mayor, Peter Skoulding, in 2005. The left-hand section of four bays were converted for retail use at that time. After Britannia's shield and arm broke off in November 2010, the statue was restored in summer 2011.
