= Wimblington =

Village in Cambridgeshire, England

Coordinates: 52.5°N 0.08°E

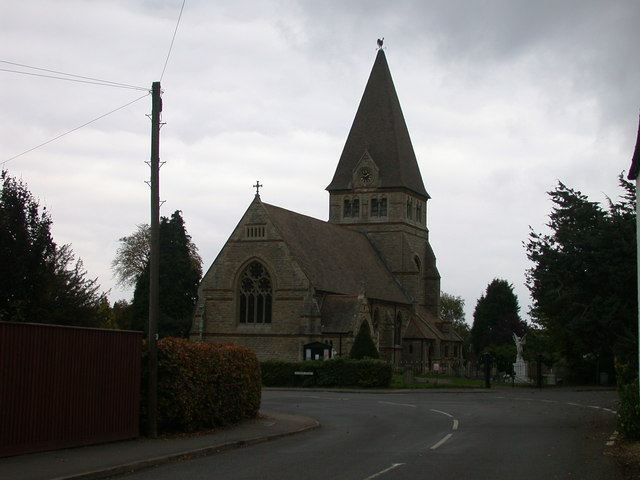
- St Peter's parish church

- Location within Cambridgeshire
- Population: 2,211 (2011 Census)
- OS grid reference: TL414912
- Civil parish: Wimblington
- District: Fenland
- Shire county: Cambridgeshire
- Region: East
- Country: England
- Sovereign state: United Kingdom
- Post town: March
- Postcode district: PE15

Wimblington is a village in the Isle of Ely, Cambridgeshire, England, with a population of 1700 as of the 2001 census, including Stonea and increasing to 2,211 at the 2011 Census.

== History ==
The place-name 'Wimblington' is first attested in a document of circa 975, where it appears as Wimblingetune. The name means 'the town or settlement of Winebald's people'.

Formerly a hamlet of the large Doddington parish, in 1874 it became a separate parish and a new church, St Peter's, was opened on 15 May of that year. The church was designed by Thomas Henry Wyatt. The village is effectively divided into two; a hamlet known as Eastwood End is separated from the main village by the A141 road, which was previously divided by the St Ives extension of the Great Eastern Railway line between March and Chatteris. Wimblington railway station closed in 1967.

Wimblington won the Cambridgeshire Times and Wisbech Standard "Best Kept Village" award nine times and in 1997 came second in the "National Village of the Year" competition. In 2002 and 2003 Wimblington & Stonea won the Fenland Section of the Calor Village of the Year competition. In 2003 Wimblington & Stonea also won the Cambridgeshire section, an achievement which was marked by the presentation of the Fairhaven Trophy, which was awarded by Lord Fairhaven of Anglesey Abbey. In the same year, Wimblington & Stonea was one of 40 villages throughout England and Wales to be put forward for the Village of the Year final, where the community won the Youth Section for the East of England and the Home Counties.

In 2005 the community raised funds for the refurbishment of the village's Italian marble War Memorial in St Peter's churchyard. The re-dedication ceremony took place just before Remembrance Sunday, which was the target date in 2005, the year marking the 60th Anniversary of the ending of World War II. As the memorial was refurbished it was agreed within the village and by various organisations, after much consultation the name of Percy Bush Cox should be removed from the War Memorial. Cox was "missing in action believed dead" following World War I, however it was discovered that Percy was still alive in 1950 when he was reunited with his family. Cox was photographed at the War Memorial and pointing at his name along with his father and brother, the photo was released in the local newspapers. Cox took his own life in the 1950s and it was discovered he had been living under another name, Ernest Durham.

== Sport in the village ==
Wimblington has a football club which consists of three teams. The village has a cricket team and archery is also practised in the village. Wimblington has two sports pitches, of which Parkfield is the main one with space for two football pitches, a cricket pitch, basketball court also used for five a side football, and a pub. The other sports field in Wimblington is solely a football pitch but has a playground for children.

The pub in the village is The Anchor. The village also had another two pubs, the oldest being the Carpenters Arms which was built in the early 17th century.

== Sister towns ==
- Morazzone, Italy (2007)
