= Doddington, Cambridgeshire =

Village and parish in England

Coordinates: 52.495°N 0.061°E

Doddington
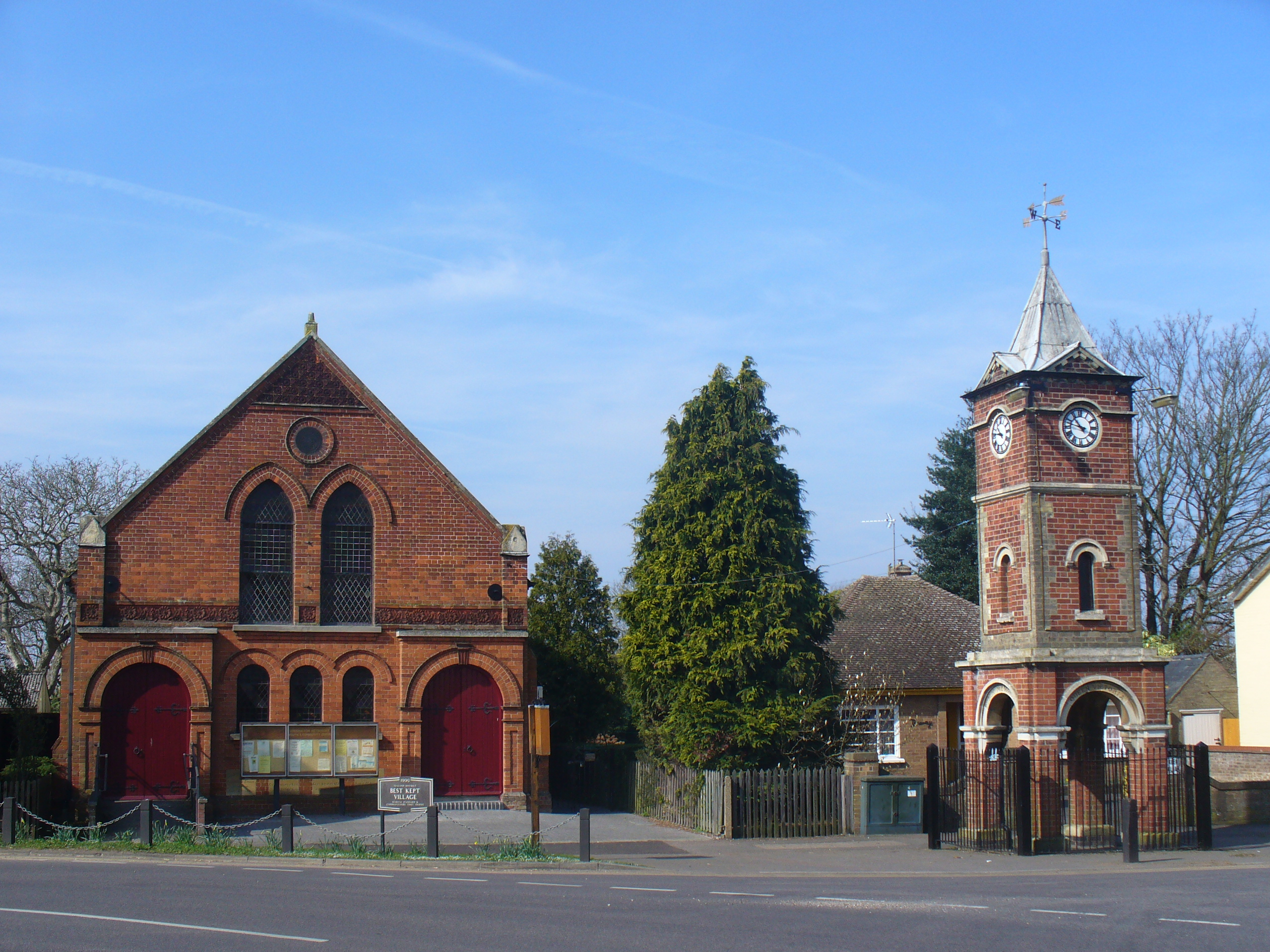
- Doddington chapel and clocktower

- Location within Cambridgeshire
- Population: 2,181 (2011)
- OS grid reference: TL402911
- Civil parish: Doddington
- District: Fenland
- Shire county: Cambridgeshire
- Region: East
- Country: England
- Sovereign state: United Kingdom
- Post town: March
- Postcode district: PE15
- Dialling code: 01354
- Police: Cambridgeshire
- Fire: Cambridgeshire
- Ambulance: East of England

Doddington is a village and civil parish lying just off the A141 in the Isle of Ely, Cambridgeshire, approximately half way (4 miles (6 km)) between Chatteris (to the south) and March (to the north).

== History ==
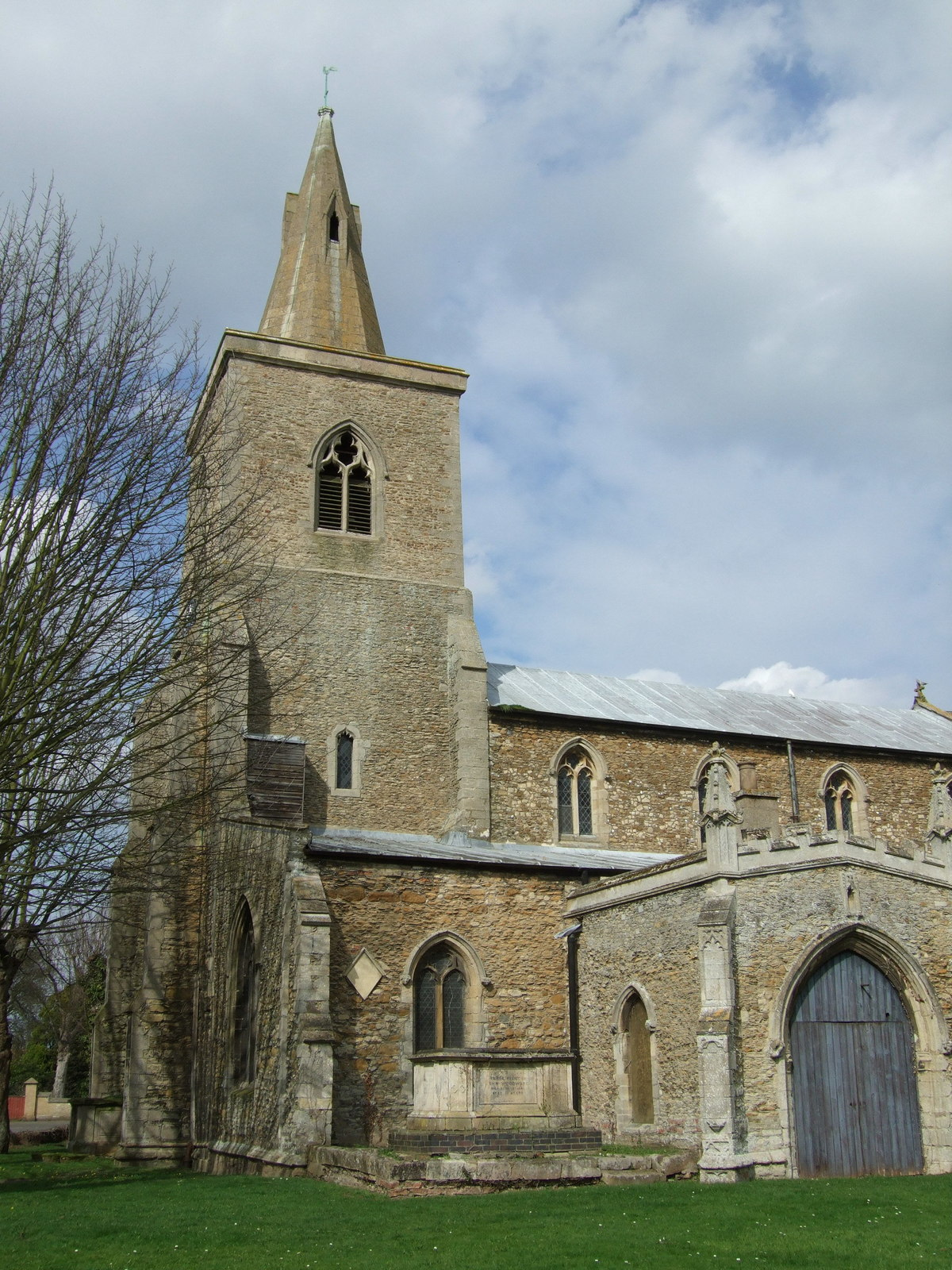
St Mary's Church

St Mary's Church, Doddington is a Grade II* listed building. Historically, Doddington was one of the largest parishes in England. Under the Doddington Rectory Division (Amendment) Act 1856 (19 & 20 Vict. c. 1 Pr.) it was divided into seven rectories, Benwick, Doddington, Wimblington, March Old Town, March St Peter, March St John and March St Mary. Doddington Hall, a private house, replaced the old Rectory in 1872.

A clocktower was built in 1897 to commemorate the Diamond Jubilee of Queen Victoria, and is in the centre of the village.

== Local government ==
The lowest level is Doddington Parish Council which has nine councillors, the village is in the two-seat 'Doddington and Wimblington' ward of Fenland District Council.

== Community ==
Doddington has almost 1,000 dwellings. The population of the civil parish at the time of the 2011 census was 2,181.

Local amenities include The Three Tuns and The George public houses, a post office, a few shops, a fish & chip fast food outlet, ladies and gents hairdressers, a GP's surgery and an NHS minor injuries unit (MIU). There are two churches, St Mary's Church of England parish church and a Methodist Chapel, and also a war memorial.

The Lionel Walden Primary School sits on Doddington High Street. In 2017 and 2023, Ofsted inspectors judged it to be a good school. The current headmaster is Steve Abey. Previous headmasters include L. W Heywood (to 1936), Stanley Payne (1936 to 1972) and D. Buck (from 1972).

Doddington has a village hall, and two sports fields, one with a pavilion containing changing rooms, catering facilities and multi-purpose room. It has a Girlguiding unit, Scout troop, a Women's Institute, the women's section of the Royal British Legion, a short mat bowls club, outdoor bowls club, cricket club, football teams, and an under 5's group. The village holds the Doddington Village Sports and Carnival on the first Saturday in July which includes a children's sports event.

== Notable people ==
- Christopher Tye, composer and organist, was rector here after taking holy orders in 1560.
- Jonnie Peacock, sprinter who won gold at the 2012 Summer Paralympics.

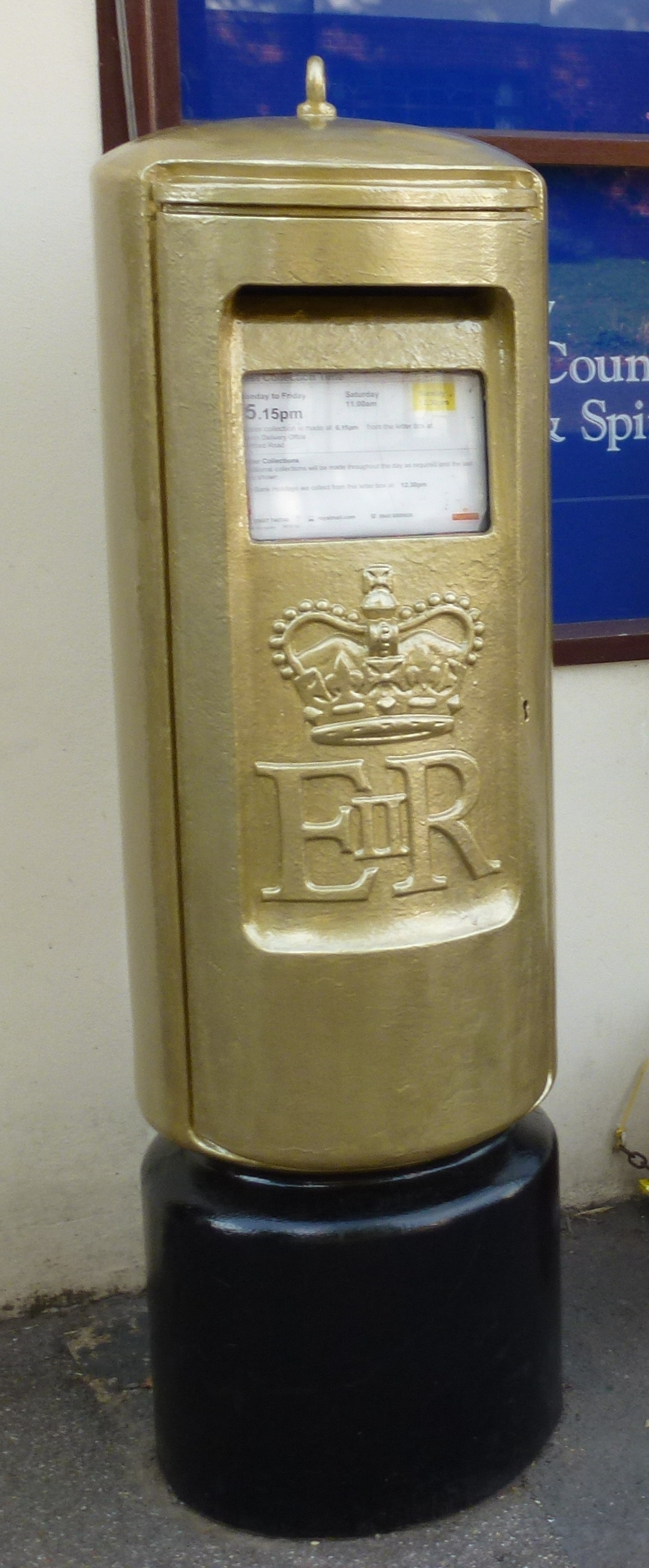
Jonnie Peacock's gold postbox in Doddington
