= Jason Wing =

British bobsledder

Jason Wing (born 12 October 1965) is a British bobsledder who competed in the mid-1990s.

== Sporting career ==
Wing's first sporting success was as a junior long jumper and sprinter, and he featured in the national rankings from 1980 to 1989.. Wing had personal bests of 10.7 for 100m and 7.22m in the long jump. During his time as a student Wing was British College's Long Jump champion on three occasions from 1985 to 1989. During his time as an athlete he was coached by the 1980 Olympic 100m Allan Wells who introduced Wing to the sport of bobsleigh. Wing was quickly promoted to the Great Britain team to compete on the World Cup circuit of competitions. Wing was selected for the squad to compete at the 1992 Olympic Games in La Plagne, France but instead chose to pursue a professional career in Rugby League.

Wing returned to bobsleigh for the 1994 Winter Olympics in Lillehammer where he finished fifth in the four-man event for GB1 team piloted by Mark Tout. He gained a silver medal at the 1994 European Championships (four-man) in La Plagne, France as well as gaining silver and bronze medals during the 1993/4 World Cup circuit in Altenberg, Germany and St Moritz, Switzerland. After a two-year break from bobsleigh competition Wing again returned to the sport and was selected for the GB squad for the 1998 Winter Olympics in Nagano but he suffered a career-ending injury to his thigh whilst competing in a World Cup race in Calgary, Canada.

As a teenager Wing played Rugby Union for Cambridgeshire Colts before being introduced to Rugby League during his time at Borough Road PE College in west London. In 1988 Wing was selected for Great Britain Students Rugby League side playing against France. He later played professional Rugby League for London Crusaders in 1991-1993.

== Teaching career ==
Wing is a schoolteacher and has taught PE since 1989. Educated at Neale-Wade School, he taught at several schools including Witchford Village College, Isleworth and Syon School and Gunnersbury School for Boys. Wing coached a number of high-performing athletes during his time as a PE teacher, including Watford FC player Michael Bryan.

He returned to his former school Neale-Wade as principal in 2011. Wing was appointed as Executive Headteacher for both Neale-Wade and Burrowmoor Primary School in May 2015. In June 2017 Wing was awarded National Leader of Education status and Neale-Wade was in turn was designated as a National Support School.
