= Manea, Cambridgeshire =

Village and civil parish in Cambridgeshire, England

Coordinates: 52.48°N 0.17°E

Manea
- Location within Cambridgeshire
- Population: 2,810 (2021)
- District: Fenland
- Shire county: Cambridgeshire
- Region: East
- Country: England
- Sovereign state: United Kingdom
- Post town: MARCH
- Postcode district: PE15
- Dialling code: 01354

Manea /ˈmeɪniː/ is a village and civil parish in the District of Fenland, Isle of Ely, Cambridgeshire, England.

The population (including Welches Dam) of the civil parish at the 2021 census was 2,810.

Landmarks are Manea railway station and RSPB Welches Dam nature reserve on the Ouse Washes.

The village's brass band, the Manea Silver Band, was formed in 1882; it meets at Manea Royal British Legion. Manea men's and women's football teams compete in local leagues and cup competitions.

== History ==
Stonea Camp, an Iron Age hill fort is located approximately 1 mile west of the village.

Manea was once a hamlet in the parish of Coveney. In the seventeenth century, as part of a programme to drain the Fens, Charles I planned to build a new town and summer palace, to be called Charlemont. The scheme was opposed by local residents, including Oliver Cromwell, the MP of nearby Cambridge, who called the scheme "contrary to the law of God and nature".

The village's Church of England parish church is dedicated to St Nicholas and was built in 1875 to replace a building dating from 1791. It is a Grade II listed building.

== Manea Colony ==
The Manea Colony was set up in 1838 at Manea Fen as an experimental Utopian community but failed after a couple of years. It was based on the ideas of Robert Owen, a utopian socialist and founded by local farmer William Hodson. One of the earliest members of the colony was Samuel Rowbotham, a proponent of flat Earth theory.

The buildings were built with bricks from the colony's brickworks and slate for roofing. Welsh slate from Porthmadog was already arriving at the Port of Wisbech and King's Lynn by 1830. The colony produced a newspaper the Working Bee on their own press.

On 16 February 1841 Hodson published a notice stating that "The Late Friendly Society, called 'Manea Fen Colony' has been legally dissolved" in the Cambridge Chronicle of 20 February 1841. A model of the colony and copies of the Working Bee are on display at Octavia Hill's Birthplace House, Wisbech.

The Leicester Mercury on 24 April 1841 published details of a trial at Isle of Ely Quarter Sessions of 7 April. Hodson was fined £10 and Thomas Golding £1 for having on 13 February assaulted Maria Ward, a candidate for admission to the colony.

Hodson emigrated and died on 18 April 1880 at Janesville, Wisconsin, US.

During September and October 2016 the Cambridge Archaeological Unit (CAU) followed up geophysics surveys by Fenland Archaeological Society (FenArch) and conducted fieldwork as part of a HLF-funded project.
