= Friday Bridge, Cambridgeshire =

Village in Cambridgeshire, England

Coordinates: 52.6209°N 0.1632°E

Friday Bridge
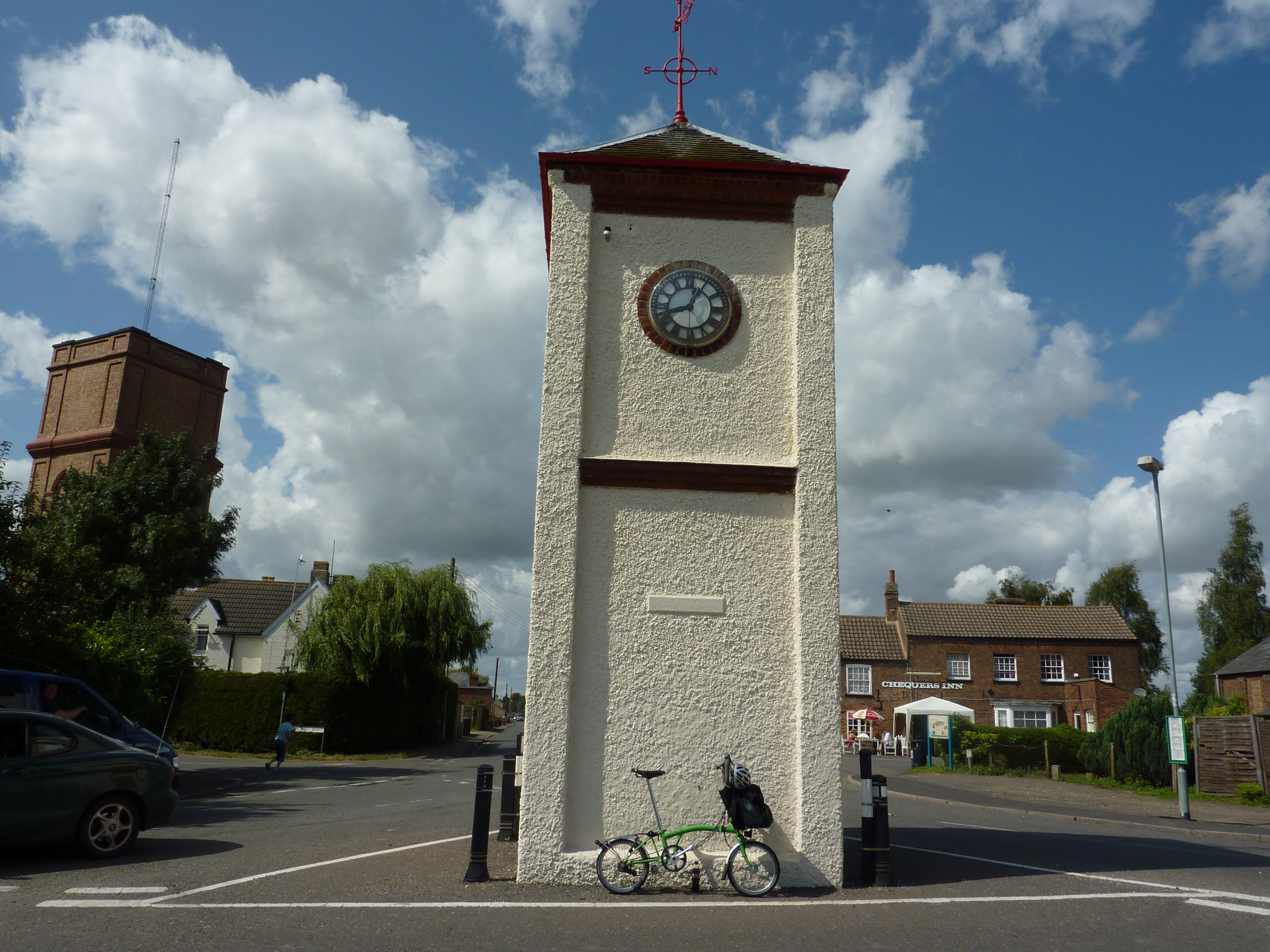
- Clocktower

- Location within Cambridgeshire
- Area: 0.6608 km^{2} (0.2551 sq mi)
- Population: 1,412 (2021 census)
  - Density: 2,137/km^{2} (5,530/sq mi)
- OS grid reference: TF4604
- Civil parish: Elm
- District: Fenland
- Shire county: Cambridgeshire
- Region: East
- Country: England
- Sovereign state: United Kingdom
- Post town: Wisbech
- Postcode district: PE14
- Dialling code: 01945
- Police: Cambridgeshire
- Fire: Cambridgeshire
- Ambulance: East of England

Friday Bridge is a village in the civil parish of Elm, in the Fenland district of Cambridgeshire, England. It is 3 miles south of the town of Wisbech. In 2021 it had a population of 1412.

== History ==
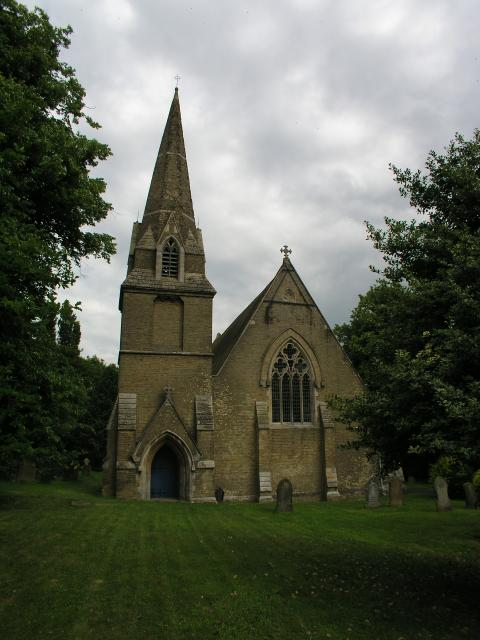
St Mark's, Friday Bridge

In 1838 a Wesleyan Methodist congregation was established and a chapel in 1843.

The ecclesiastical parish was formed in 1860 from the civil parish of Elm. St Mark's Church of England parish church, designed by J. B. Owen opened in 1865. The church is now Grade II listed but, because it was built of thin brick, the spire started leaning and was causing drainage problems and leaks so it is needing to be demolished. A church day school was opened in 1871. The Wisbech Water Works Co Ltd Water Tower was completed in 1894. The Friday Bridge county secondary modern school was opened in 1928.

The clock tower in the village is the war memorial. Friday Bridge was the site of a World War II prisoner of war camp which was converted to a hostel for migrant workers in the late 1940s.

The village was struck by a weak F0/T0 tornado on 23 November 1981, as part of the record-breaking nationwide tornado outbreak on that day.
