= March, Cambridgeshire =

Town and civil parish in Cambridgeshire, England

Coordinates: 52.551°N 0.088°E

March
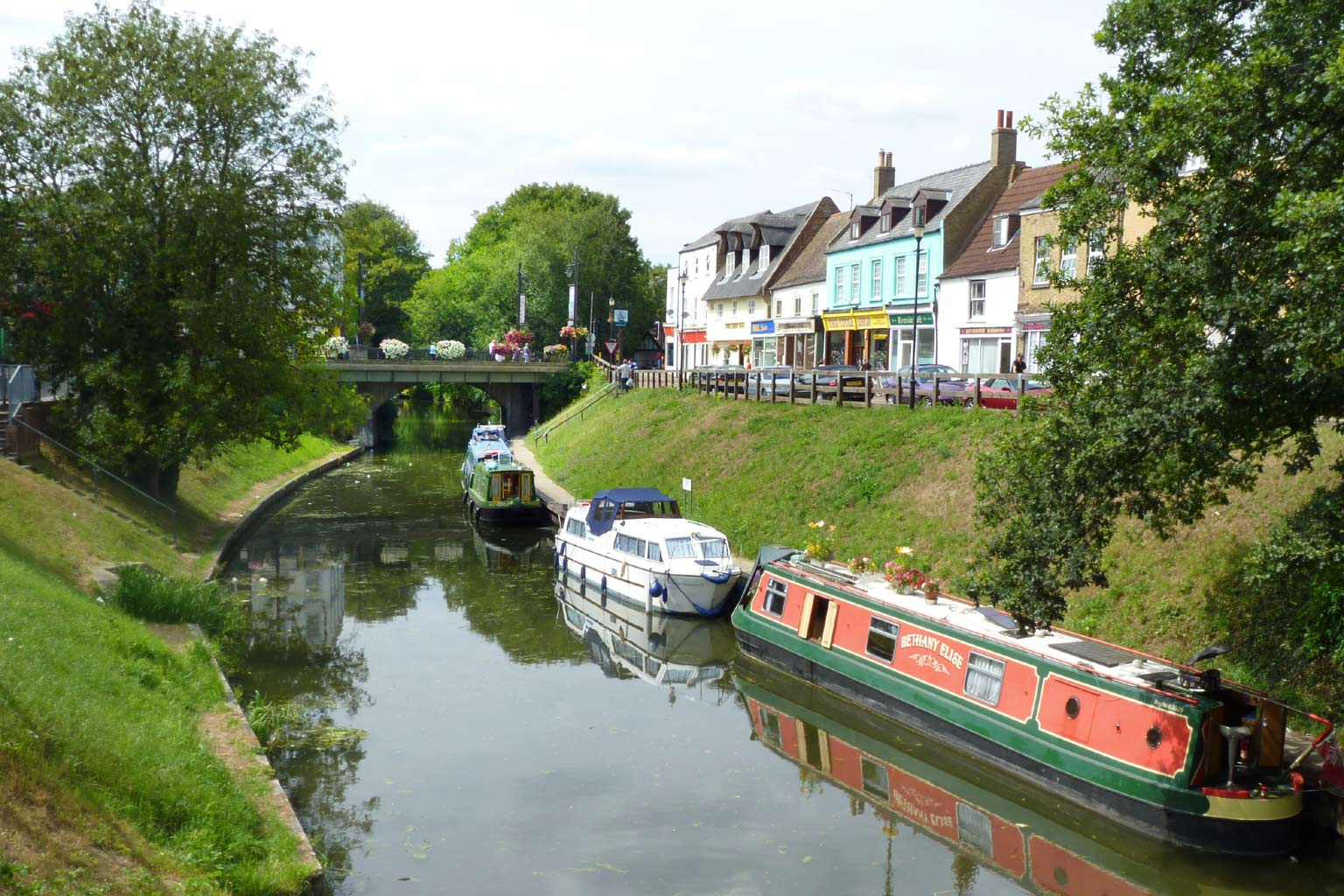
- March High Street bridge over the River Nene

- Location within Cambridgeshire
- Population: 22,970 (2021 Census)
- OS grid reference: TL4196
- Civil parish: March
- District: Fenland
- Shire county: Cambridgeshire
- Region: East
- Country: England
- Sovereign state: United Kingdom
- Post town: MARCH
- Postcode district: PE15
- Dialling code: 01354
- Police: Cambridgeshire
- Fire: Cambridgeshire
- Ambulance: East of England
- UK Parliament: North East Cambridgeshire

March is a Fenland market town and civil parish in the Isle of Ely area of Cambridgeshire, England. It was the county town of the Isle of Ely which was a separate administrative county from 1889 to 1965. The administrative centre of Fenland District Council is located in the town.

The town grew by becoming an important railway centre. Like many Fenland towns, March was once an island surrounded by marshes. It occupied the second largest "island" in the Great Level. As the land was drained, the town grew and prospered as a trading and religious centre. It was also a minor port before becoming, in more recent times, a market town and an administrative and railway centre. March is situated on the banks of the navigable old course of the River Nene, today mainly used by pleasure boats.

== History ==
March was recorded as Merche in the Domesday Book of 1086, perhaps from the Old English mearc meaning 'boundary'. Modern March lies on the course of the Fen Causeway, a Roman road, and there is evidence of Roman settlements in the area. Before the draining of the fens, March was effectively an island in the marshy fens. The town probably owes its origin to the ford on the old course of the River Nene, where the road between Ely and Wisbech, the two chief towns of the Isle of Ely, crossed the river. At one time shipping on the River Nene provided the basis of the town's trade, but this declined with the coming of the railways in the 19th century.

A single arch bridge was built over the River Nene towards the north end of the town in 1850. High Street, which is the chief thoroughfare, is continued over the bridge to Broad Street on the north side of the Nene, and The Causeway is lined with a fine avenue of elm and other trees.

A theatre was built for Joseph Smedley in 1826.

HM Prison Whitemoor, opened in 1991, lies slightly to the northwest of the town. Whitemoor is a maximum security prison for nearly 500 men in Category A and B.

== Governance ==
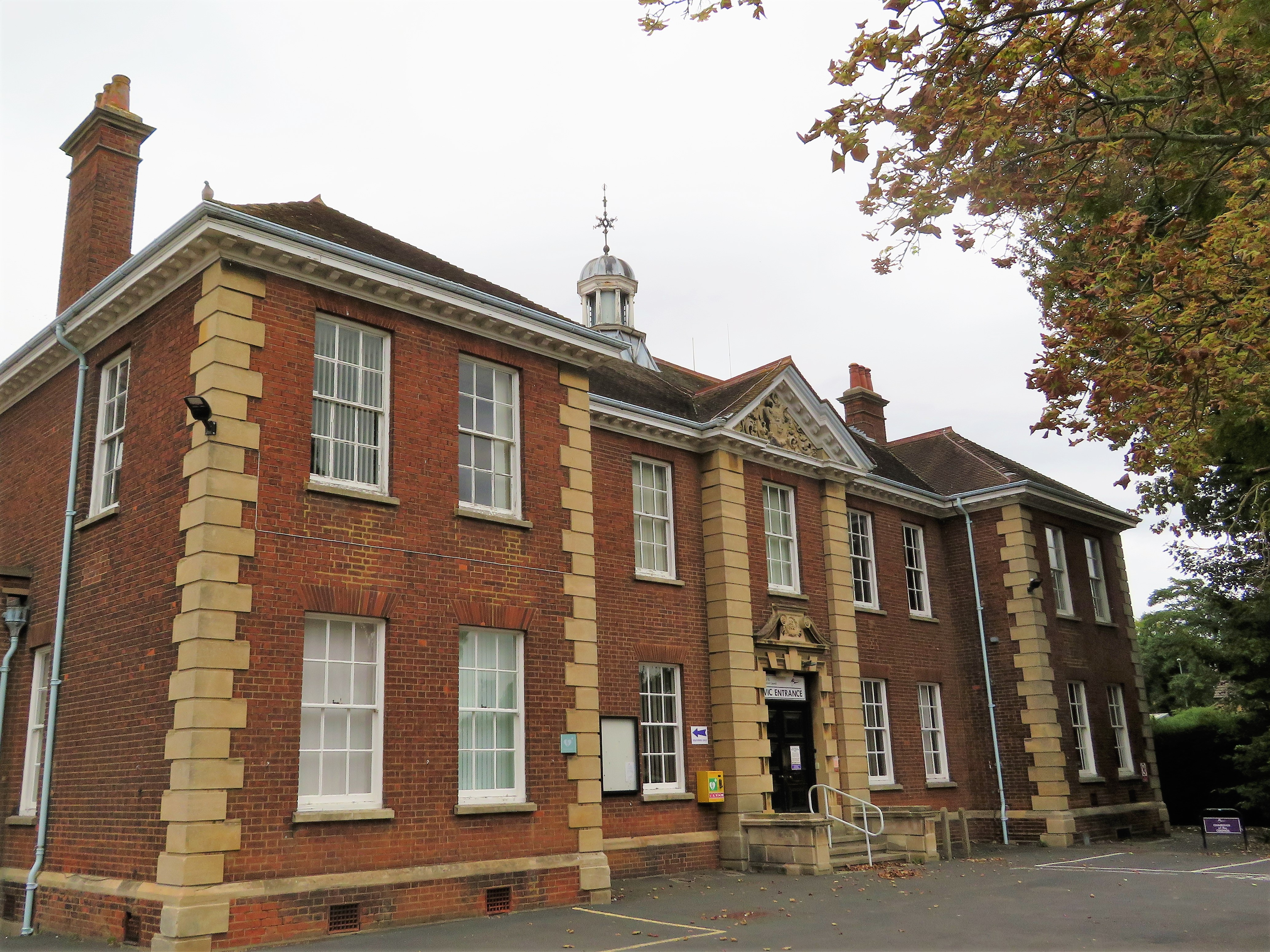
Fenland Hall: Headquarters of Fenland District Council since 1974; built 1909 as County Hall for Isle of Ely County Council

There are three tiers of local government covering March, at civil parish (town), district, and county level: March Town Council, Fenland District Council, and Cambridgeshire County Council. The district and county councils are also members of the Cambridgeshire and Peterborough Combined Authority, led by the directly elected Mayor of Cambridgeshire and Peterborough. The town council is based at March Town Hall in the Market Place. A town mayor is elected by councillors at the annual meeting in May each year. The town council administers allotments, sponsors band concerts and owns the March Museum. Fenland District Council is also based in the town, at Fenland Hall on County Road.

March is in the parliamentary constituency of North East Cambridgeshire.

=== Administrative history ===
March was historically a chapelry within the ancient parish of Doddington, which formed part of the North Witchford hundred of Cambridgeshire. The chapelry of March became a separate civil parish in 1866. The North Witchford hundred formed part of the Isle of Ely, which was historically a liberty under the secular jurisdiction of the Bishop of Ely. The bishop's jurisdiction was ended by the Liberty of Ely Act 1837.

A local board district covering the chapelry of March was established in 1851. Such districts were reconstituted as urban districts under the Local Government Act 1894. March Urban District Council built the Town Hall in 1900 to serve as its headquarters.

Between 1889 and 1965, the Isle of Ely was an administrative county with its own county council, whilst also forming part of the wider geographical county of Cambridgeshire. Isle of Ely County Council chose to base itself in March, building County Hall on County Road in 1909 (renamed Fenland Hall in 1974). Between 1965 and 1974, the administrative county covering March was called Cambridgeshire and Isle of Ely.

March Urban District was abolished in 1974 under the Local Government Act 1972. District-level functions passed to the new Fenland District Council. A successor parish called March was created covering the area of the abolished urban district, with its parish council taking the name March Town Council.

== Markets ==
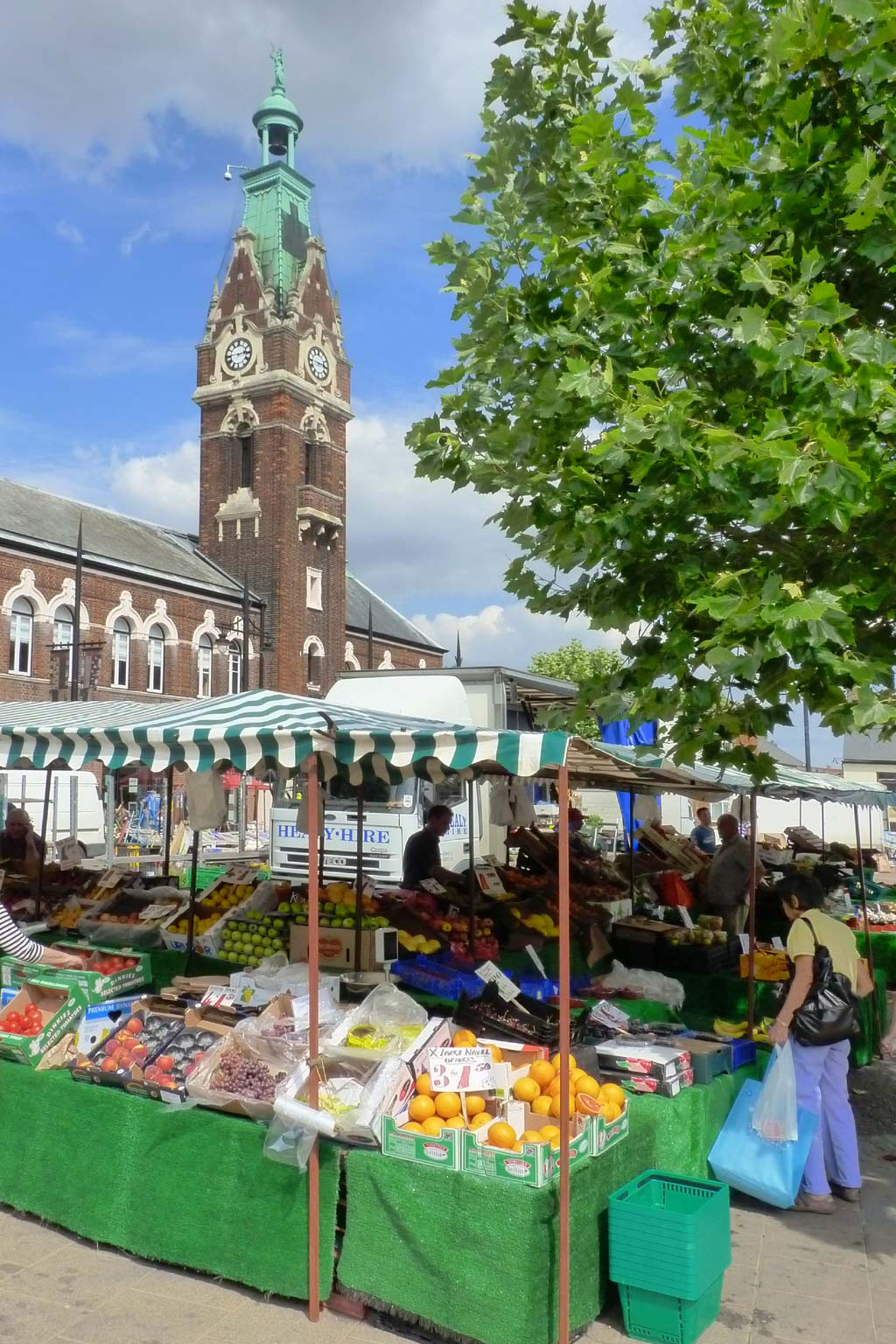
March Town Hall and market

With a long history of trading, in the reign of Elizabeth I, March was a minor port. In 1566 eight boats, capable of carrying one, one and a half, or two cartloads, were used in the coal and grain trades. A certain amount of traffic in coal and other commodities, carried in barges, was observed by Dugdale in 1657. Local tradesmen's tokens of 1669, and a silver shilling token of 1811, have been noted.

Originally a market appears to have been held near the original town (then village) centre, on land beside The Causeway. A Market Cross (now called The Stone Cross) points towards the existence of an early market and this cross was erected in the early 16th century. This site was near St Wendreda's Church. In 1669, the town successfully petitioned King Charles II and in 1670 he granted the Lord of the Manor of Doddington a Royal Charter with the right to hold a market with two annual fairs, in spite of the opposition of Wisbech Corporation. This market was held on Fridays. The Lord of the Manor of Doddington, who owned a large part of March, gave special permission to the townspeople to sell their goods on some of his land in the town centre. This site, now called the Market Place, was then known as Bridge Green Common and later named Market Hill.

In 1785, the tolls were assessed at £6 per year. Soon after this the market appears to have lapsed, though the fairs continued to prosper. The development of the market was impeded by the lack of a covered hall and because market day in several neighbouring towns fell on the same day (Friday). In 1807, the Vestry decided that it was not hygienic for goods to be loaded or unloaded in the vicinity of the market and ordered all saw pits, timber and other encroachments around the Market Place to be removed. The market was struggling during this time and an attempt to revive it in 1821 was not very successful. A Buttercross, also known as a market house, was erected in 1831. This building also housed the town fire engine and had an upstairs room that for a time housed the Clock House School and later the Town Surveyor's Office. This office was covered by a turret which housed the Town Clock (purchased by public subscription about 1750) and the Fire Bell. In later refurbishments this clock was re-housed in St Peter's Church Tower. The Town Stocks were also placed in the Market Place and local offenders (and those who refused to go to church) were placed in them. The want of a market house was remedied, in a makeshift fashion, by Sir Henry Peyton (who was the Lord of the Manor of Doddington). His building, however, was only 40 ft long (12 m) by 17 ft broad (5.2 m), and provided only 14 stalls under cover.

After the opening of the railway in 1847 another attempt was made to increase the market. In 1851 the market had been said to be "making progress"; and £150 was subscribed to give a treat to the poor at its reopening. The clash with other market days was solved in December 1856 by changing market day from Friday to Wednesday "by private arrangement and without any formalities". The tolls were, however, collected in an arbitrary and haphazard way; they were assessed for poor rate purposes at £10. Statute fairs for the hiring of servants took place each autumn, this was also an opportunity to socialise, and shows and ginger bread stalls were set up, the large numbers could also attract pickpockets. In 1872, the Board of Health bought a Shand and Mason fire engine that was the town's first steam appliance and was housed in the Market House. In the same year the vestry agreed to erect a urinal at the back of the Buttercross for use by boys attending the Clock House School, but would not erect a water closet (toilet).

The market toll-keeper in 1888, though he had no fixed scale of charges and kept no record of receipts, was said to be taking about £50 a year. The success and prosperity of the market fluctuated over the years and an attempt by the Local Board to purchase the market rights to mark Queen Victoria's Golden Jubilee of 1887 was a failure. However, in 1897, Sir Algernon Peyton agreed to sell the market rights, the Market Place and Market House to March Urban District Council for £800. At that time the market was leased to F. B. Phillips, who agreed to surrender his lease in 1898 subject to receiving the market tolls for one year without charge.

The market rights passed to Fenland District Council following the local government reorganisation in 1974. The current (2020) market days are Wednesday and Saturday.

== Religion ==
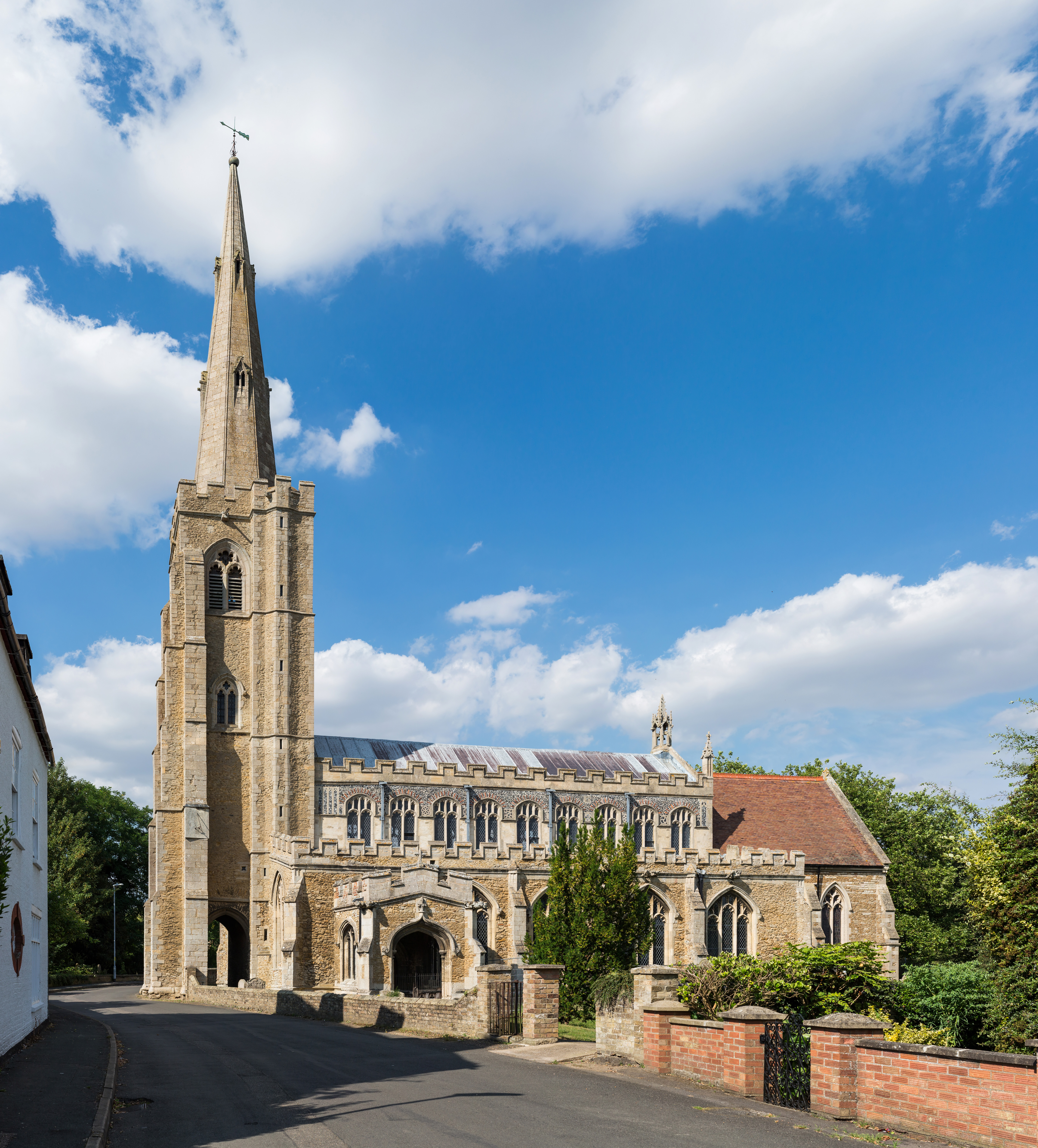
St Wendreda's Church

The inhabitants of the town are served by eleven churches.

=== St Wendreda's Church ===
St Wendreda, to whom the oldest church in the town is dedicated, is the town's own saint and March is the only known church dedication to her. She was a 7th-century Anglo-Saxon who may have been a daughter of King Anna of East Anglia (killed 654) one of the first Christian Kings of the kingdom of East Anglia. Two of her possible sisters, Etheldreda and Sexburgha, who were the abbesses of Ely and Minster-in-Sheppey respectively, are better known saints. She is also associated with Exning, Suffolk.

The saint's relics were enshrined in gold in Ely Cathedral, until in 1016 they were carried off to battle in the hope they would bring victory to Edmund Ironside, the son of King Ethelred. But at the Battle of Ashingdon the army of King Canute captured the relics and he presented them to Canterbury Cathedral. In 1343 the relics were returned to March, but their final resting place is unknown.

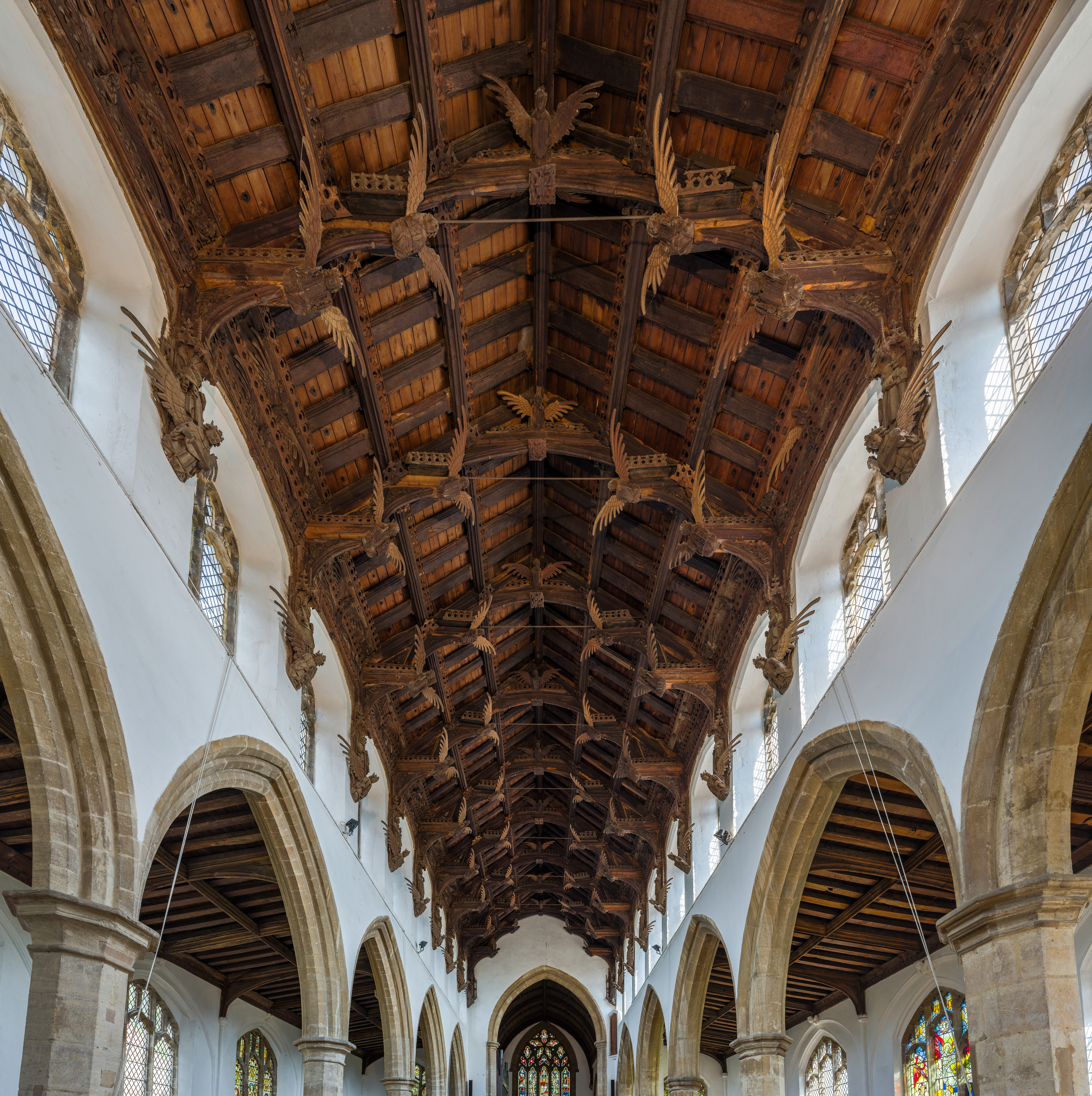
The angels of the roof of St Wendreda's Church

The church is known for its magnificent double-hammer beam roof with 120 carved angels; it is regarded as one of the best of its kind. John Betjeman described the church as "worth cycling 40 miles in a head wind to see". The church describes itself as an evangelical church "with an emphasis on biblical teaching".

=== Other churches ===
In Victorian times, other Church of England churches were built in March, nearer to where most of the inhabitants now lived. Thomas Henry Wyatt was responsible for the design of St John's (consecrated 1872), St Peter's (built 1881) and St Mary's (Westry, built 1874). The four March Anglican churches now share a 'Team Ministry'.

Trinity Church is now a joint Methodist and United Reformed Church. It was built as a Methodist church in the late 19th century to replace the small St Paul's Methodist Chapel in Gas Road. Development work was carried out during the late 1980s to convert St Paul's Methodist Church into Trinity Church by joining St Paul's, the United Reformed Church, and the Primitive Methodist church.

Centenary Baptist Church, founded in 1700, is a member of the Baptist Union. Additionally, there is a Grace Baptist church, Providence Baptist, which was rebuilt in 1873.

An Elim Pentecostal Church meets in March Community Centre. March Evangelical Fellowship meets on Upwell Road. Fenland Community Church is unique in the local area in focussing on the needs of people with learning difficulties.

Roman Catholics are served by weekly masses in the Anglican church in Chatteris, the combined parish of March and Chatteris being dedicated to Our Lady of Good Counsel and St Peter.

=== Folklore ===
An "old legend told how the people of March in the 13th century endeavoured to build a church on the site where the present cross stands, but the devils were utterly opposed to the proposal. They considered the fenland was especially theirs ... As fast as the people of March dug their foundations and built their church the devils came and pulled the work down... This conflict lasted some years, when the March people, not to be beaten, set up the stone crucifix as an object of terror to the devils. It succeeded in its object. The devils left the town, and that is how the cross came to occupy its present position, which no doubt would have been the better site for the church."

== March Museum ==
March has its own museum, located on the High Street. It is in the building that was originally the South District Girls School, constructed in the 1850s, it went from school to school, until 1976 when the building was purchased by the Town Council. The Museum was opened in 1977.

It is open every Saturday and Wednesday from 10:30 – 15:30 and contains a vast amount of local memorabilia, both from March, and its surrounding villages. Such artefacts include the clock face from the Church of St Mary, Benwick and a large collection of cameras.

== Transport ==
=== Rivers ===
The town is on either side of the River Nene (Old Course). A narrow boat marina provides berths and boats for hire.

=== Roads ===
The town now has a western bypass to take the A141 and some of the traffic away from the town centre. The B1099 and B1101 pass through the town.

=== Railways ===
The town was an important railway centre, with a major junction between the Great Eastern Railway and Great Northern Railway at March railway station. The station is 87 mi (140 km) from London by rail, 32 mi (51 km) north of Cambridge, 16 mi (26 km) north west of Ely and 9 mi (14 km) south of Wisbech.

Whitemoor marshalling yards, built in the 1920s and 30s, were once the second largest in Europe, and the largest in Britain. They were gradually phased out during the 1960s and shut down in 1990. HM Prison Whitemoor was built on part of the site. The natural regeneration of the remaining 44 hectares (110 acres) resulted in its classification as a potential country park. In addition, a new housing development was constructed adjacent to the site. However, in 2002, Network Rail identified a need for a supply depot and redeveloped part of the site.

The tracks of the March to Wisbech line remain and currently (2019) a review is taking place to assess reopening the Bramley Line. The line has been identified as a priority for reopening by the Campaign for Better Transport.

== March March march ==
The "March March march" is a 30 miles (48 km) walk from March to Cambridge, which has been walked in the month of March by students and academics from the University of Cambridge since 1979. The marchers sing the "March March March March". The point of the walk is that it is pointless; it has spawned a shorter version called the May Manea Mania.

== March delivery office ==
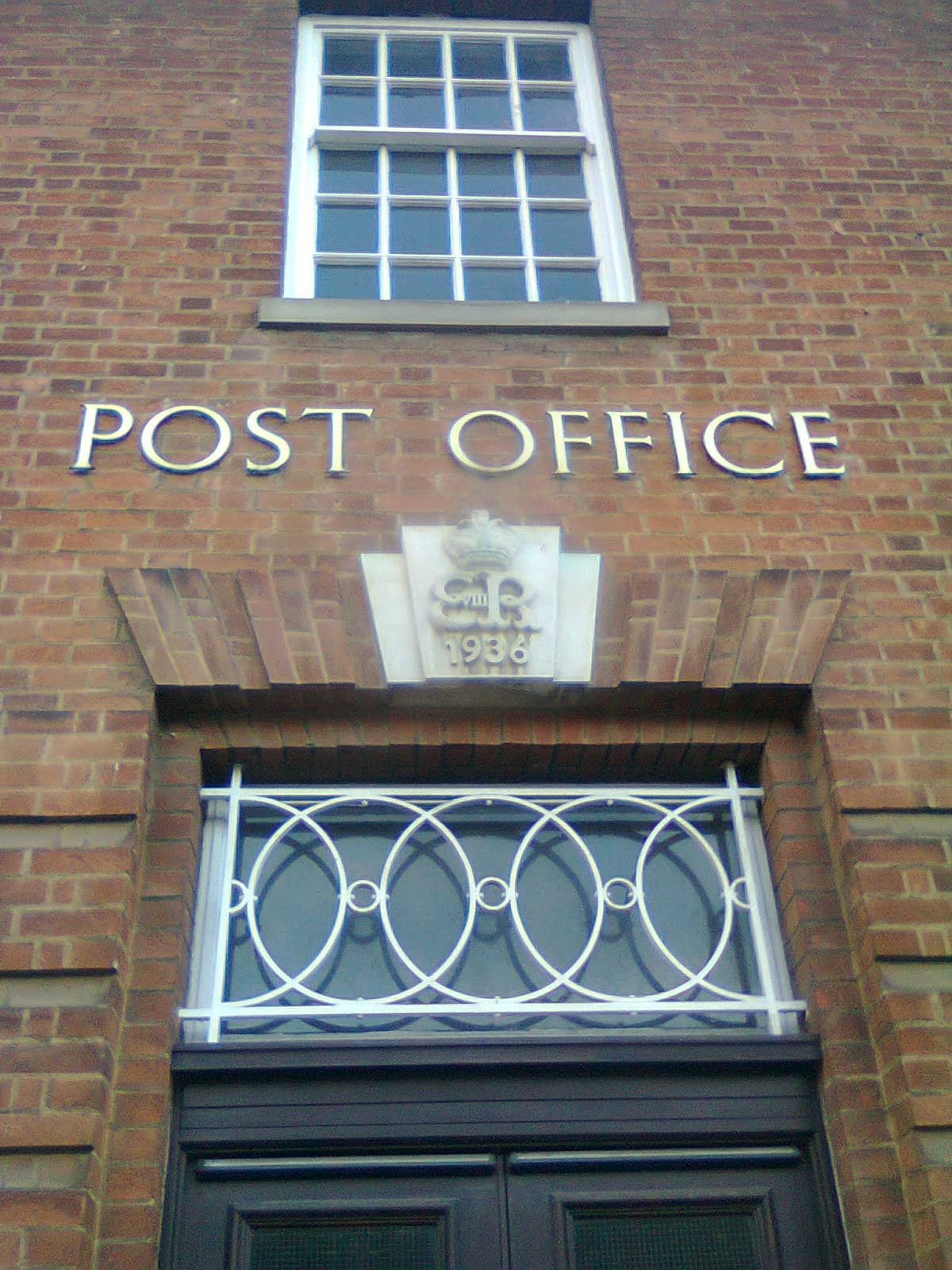
Edward VIII's cypher on March Sorting Office

March Royal Mail sorting office (previously a full post office) dates from 1936. It is unusual in that it is one of a handful of post offices that display the royal cypher from the brief reign of Edward VIII.

== Economy ==
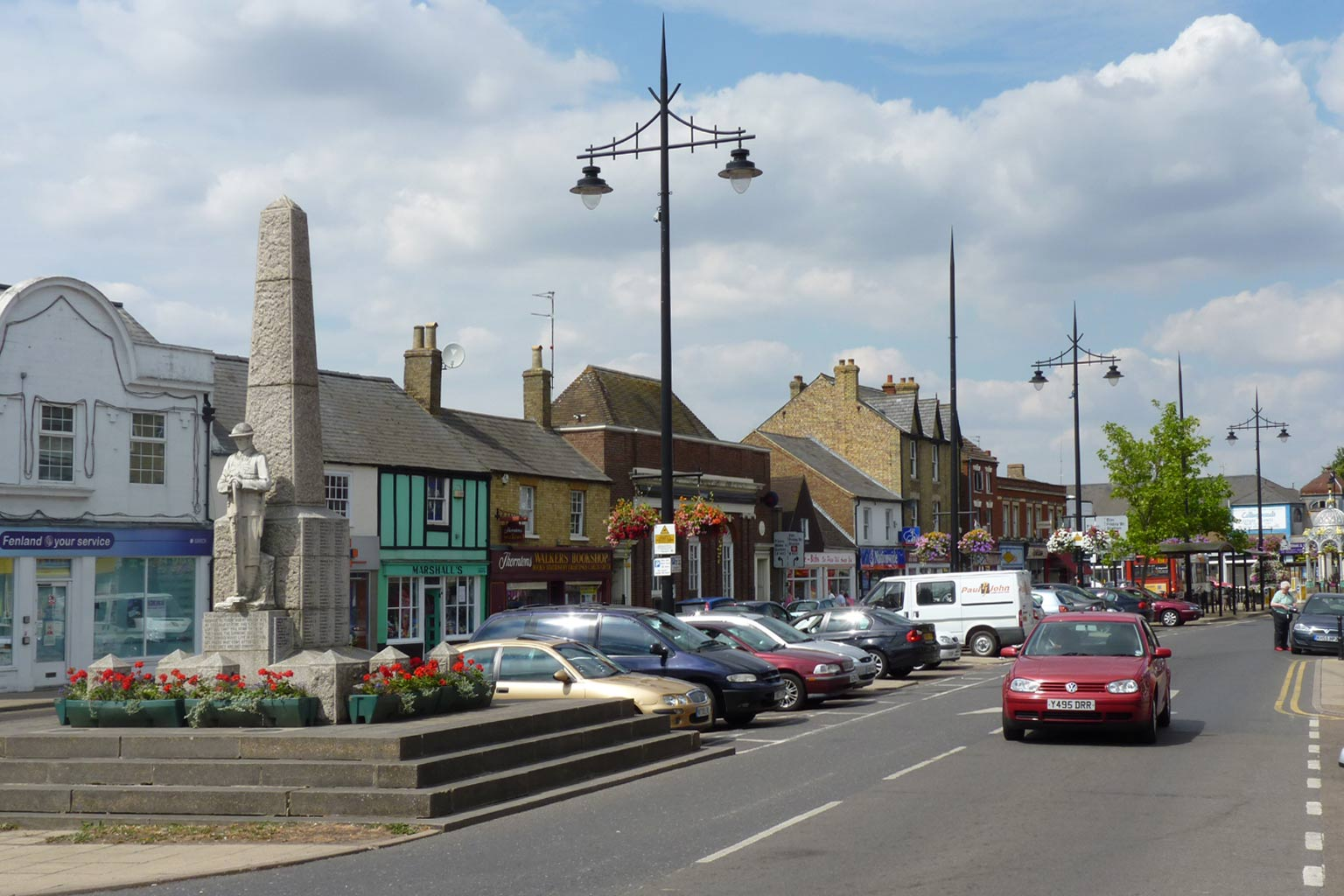
March Broad Street with the war memorial

In the town centre there are independent shops and retailers, as well as several bars and restaurants. In 2008, the Barracuda Group changed the landmark Ye Olde Griffin Hotel into a "Smith & Jones" branded pub it is now back to being branded as The Ye Olde Griffin Hotel. It is now part of the Stonegate pubs chain. In March 2011 J D Wetherspoon opened a pub in the former Hippodrome cinema and bingo hall.

The town's major employers are Whitemoor Prison and the many food processing factories in the area.

== Sport and leisure ==
March has a non-League football club, March Town United, who play at the GER Sports Ground on Robingoodfellows Lane. They play in the Eastern Counties League Premier Division. They won the United Counties Division One title in the 1953–54 season and the Eastern Counties League in the 1987-88 season. They now play in the Eastern Counties League Premier Division

March is also the home of Fen Tigers Goalball Club. Goalball is a Paralympic sport designed specifically for blind and visually impaired athletes. Founded in 2016, Fen Tigers is widely regarded as the most successful goalball club in UK history, winning multiple domestic and international titles and developing several current and former Great Britain players. The club was the first British team to qualify for the European Goalball Champions League and, in 2026, reached the EGCA Champions League Finals, establishing itself as one of the top ten clubs in Europe.

Norwood Nature Reserve is a 6.5 acres (2.6 ha) site north of the railway station.

== Notable people ==
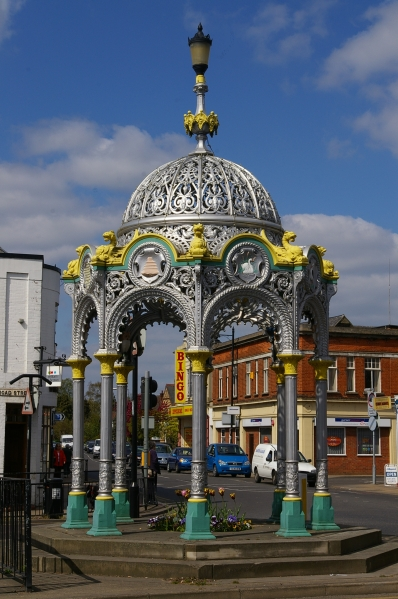
Memorial Fountain in Broad Street commemorates the Coronation of King George V in 1911

- William Barker (1817–1894), gold prospector
- Benjamin Gimbert (1903–1976), awarded the George Cross
- Louise Hazel (born 1985), heptathlete
- Wentworth M. Johnson (born 1939), writer
- Kevin Painter (born 1967), darts player
- Martin Peerson (ca. 1570–ca. 1650), composer
- Rex Tucker (1930–1996), TV director
- Eric Sherbrooke Walker (1887–1976), owner of Treetops Hotel
- Jason Wing (born 1965), Olympic bobsleigher
- Terry Woodgate (1919–1985), footballer
- Daniel Roper (born 1990), Great Britain goalball player
- Joseph Roper (born 1998), Great Britain goalball player

== See also ==
- Dunhams Wood
- List of places in Cambridgeshire
- Neale-Wade Academy
- Norwood Road nature reserve
