= Railways in Ely =

Railway networks in and around Ely, England

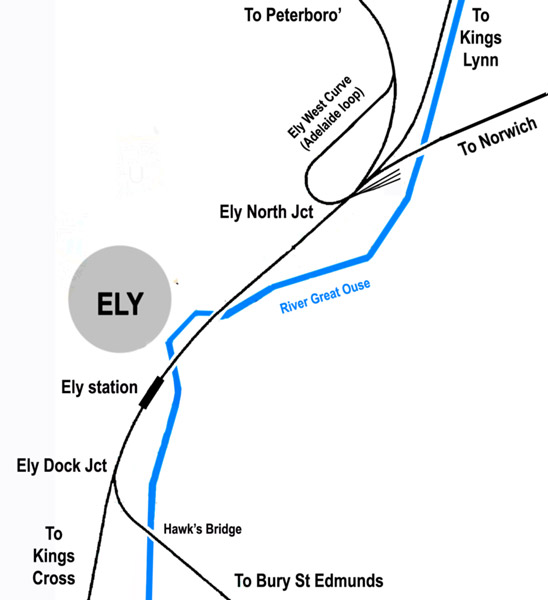
Sketch map of railways in the Ely area

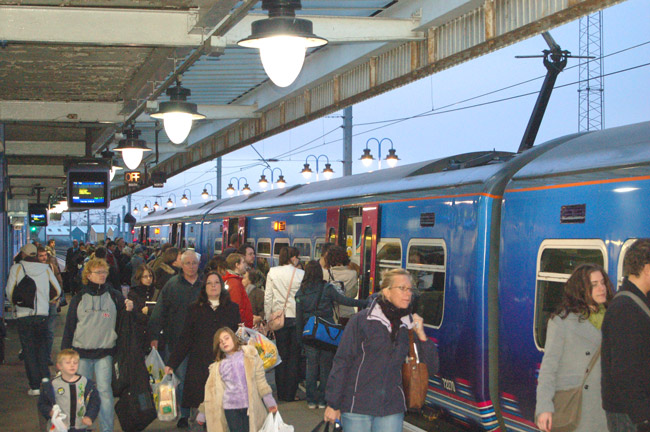
Ely railway station is a busy interchange point as evidenced by this photo of passengers boarding a First Capital Connect service

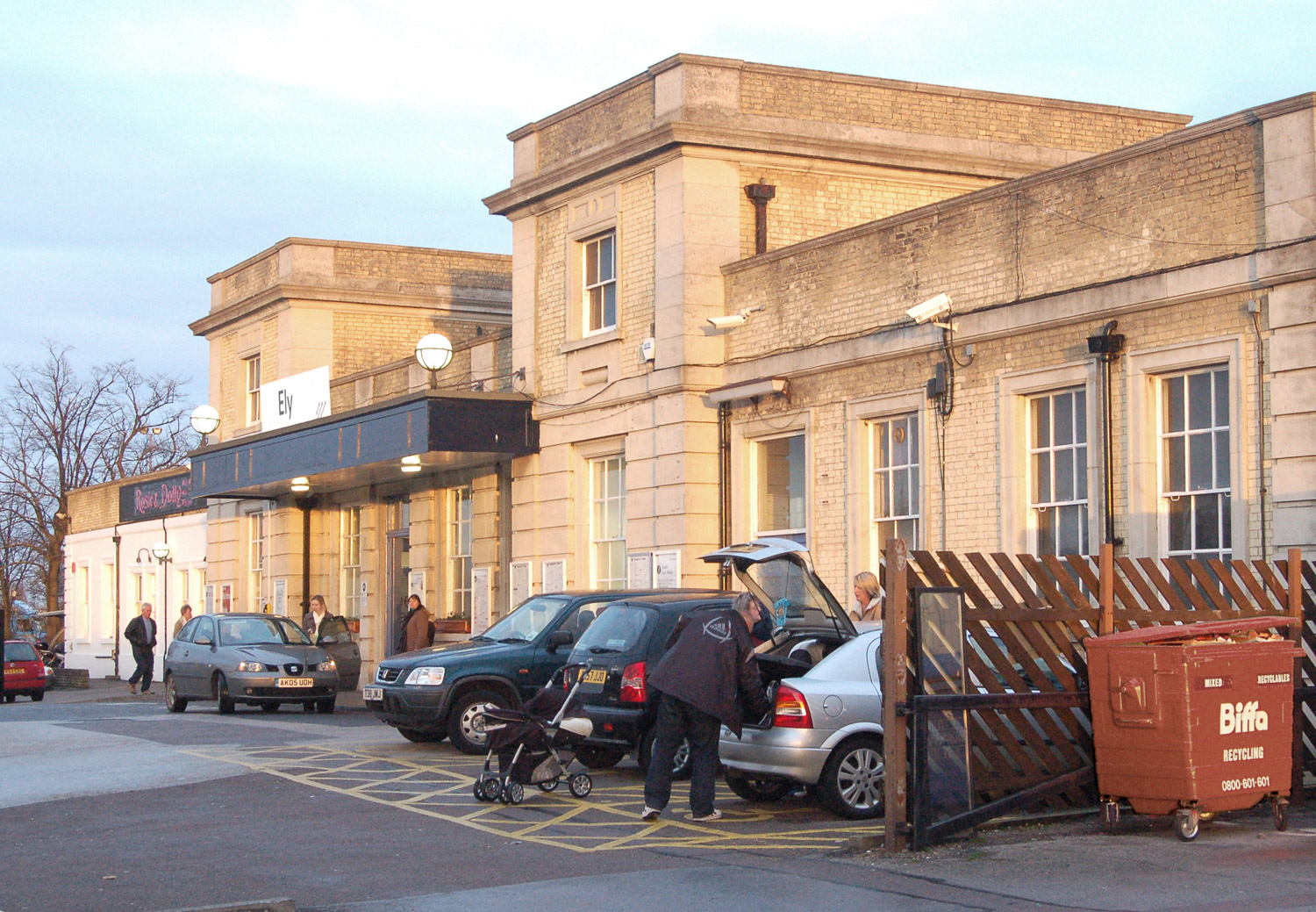
The frontage and main entrance at Ely railway station

The Railways in Ely are an important interchange point between several routes in England. There are junctions north and south of the city where rail routes from Suffolk and Norfolk connect with routes to London, the Midlands, the north of England, and Scotland. Several rail freight operating companies use these routes and four passenger train operating companies provide services through Ely.

== Ely station ==
Ely railway station 52.39116°N 0.26659°E is on the southeast edge of the city beside the River Great Ouse. The station is approx 70 miles (113 km) from London on the ex-GER (Great Eastern Railway) line from London to King's Lynn. Ely station has three platforms, all signalled for bi-directional running. Platform 1 is on the west of the station and is a facing platform backed by the main buildings. Platforms 2 and 3 are the two faces of an island platform. Generally speaking, London-King's Lynn services use platform 1 (down) and platform 2 (up) while east-to-west services use platform 3; however, the track layout and signalling allow any route to use any platform in either direction.

The original station was opened in 1845 but the Italianate main building has been much altered over the years. Most recently, the station was substantially upgraded in the early 1990s to coincide with overhead 25 kV AC electrification of the London to King's Lynn route. Until 1923 Ely station was owned and operated by the GER; from 1923 to 1948 by the London & North Eastern Railway (LNER); and from 1948 until privatisation in the 1990s by the Eastern Region of British Railways. The current station operator is Abellio Greater Anglia.

== Ely North Junction ==
Ely North Junction is located at Queen Adelaide 52.40420°N 0.29054°E approximately one-and-a-half miles (2 km) north of Ely station. From Ely North Junction the electrified ex-GER London-King's Lynn double-track main line (marketed as the Fen Line) runs north to Downham Market and King's Lynn. Two non-electrified double-track lines branch at North Junction: the line to Norwich (marketed as the Breckland Line) diverges to the northeast; the Ely to Peterborough Line to March and Peterborough (marketed as the Hereward Line) diverges to the northwest. At Peterborough there is direct connection to the East Coast Main Line from London to Scotland and the Peterborough to Birmingham route.

Immediately east of Ely North Junction is Potter Distribution Depot which has substantial railfreight facilities. Cemex operates an asphalt and building materials depot at the site.

== Ely West Curve ==
Ely West Curve (also known as the 'Adelaide loop', the 'Ely avoiding line' and the 'Ely freight loop') is a single-track loop which branches in the up direction from Ely North Junction. The loop turns through 180 degrees to re-join the Ely to Peterborough Line in the down (northbound) direction. Ely West Curve was laid in on 1 October 1890, to allow freight trains from the Midlands and north to run directly onto the King's Lynn and Norwich lines without reversal at Ely station. Later, it was used by an increasing number of passenger trains, particularly holiday expresses to the Norfolk coast. In 1966, regular passenger traffic over the curve ceased. As of 2016, there is one passenger train per week, in one direction only, which uses the Ely West Curve: this is the East Midlands Railway 15:54 Sunday service from Norwich to Manchester Piccadilly.

== Ely Dock Junction ==
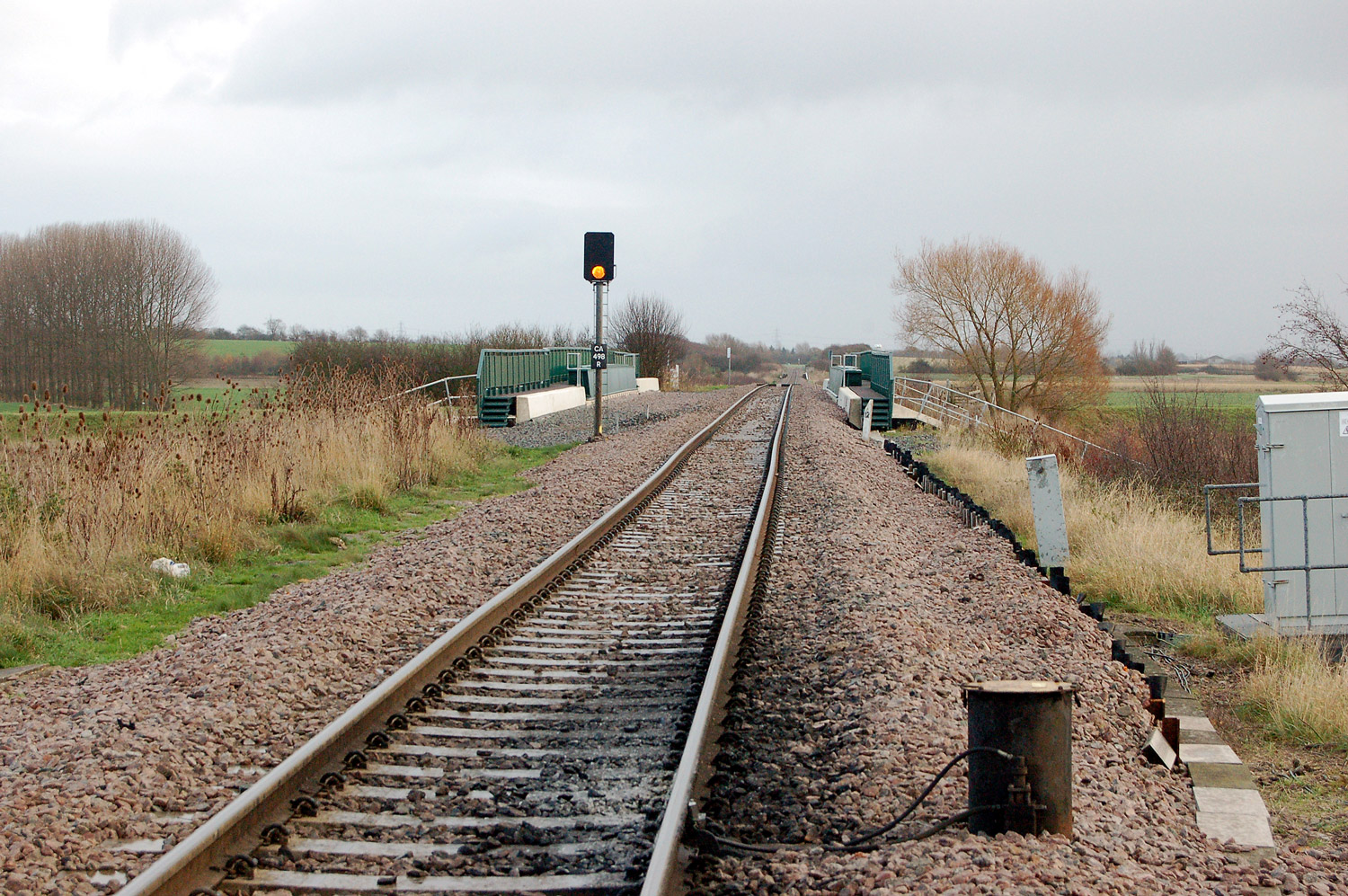
Hawk Bridge was rebuilt in 2007 wide enough to accommodate double track

Ely Dock Junction is just under a mile south of Ely station 52.38458°N 0.26101°E on the London-King's Lynn main line. From the junction, the non-electrified single-track Ely to Ipswich line diverges to the southeast. The line serves Newmarket, Bury St Edmunds and Ipswich where it connects with the ex-GER main line from London Liverpool Street station to Norwich.

Hawk Bridge is half-a-mile east of Ely Dock Junction 52.37993°N 0.26492°E and carries the Newmarket line over the River Great Ouse. The original bridge was severely damaged by a freight train derailment which occurred on 22 June 2007. A replacement was erected, and opened on 20 December 2007. The new bridge carries a single line (as did the old) but has been built wide enough to allow the line to be doubled at a later date. The speed restriction has also been raised from 20 to 60 mph (32 to 97 km/h).

== Images ==
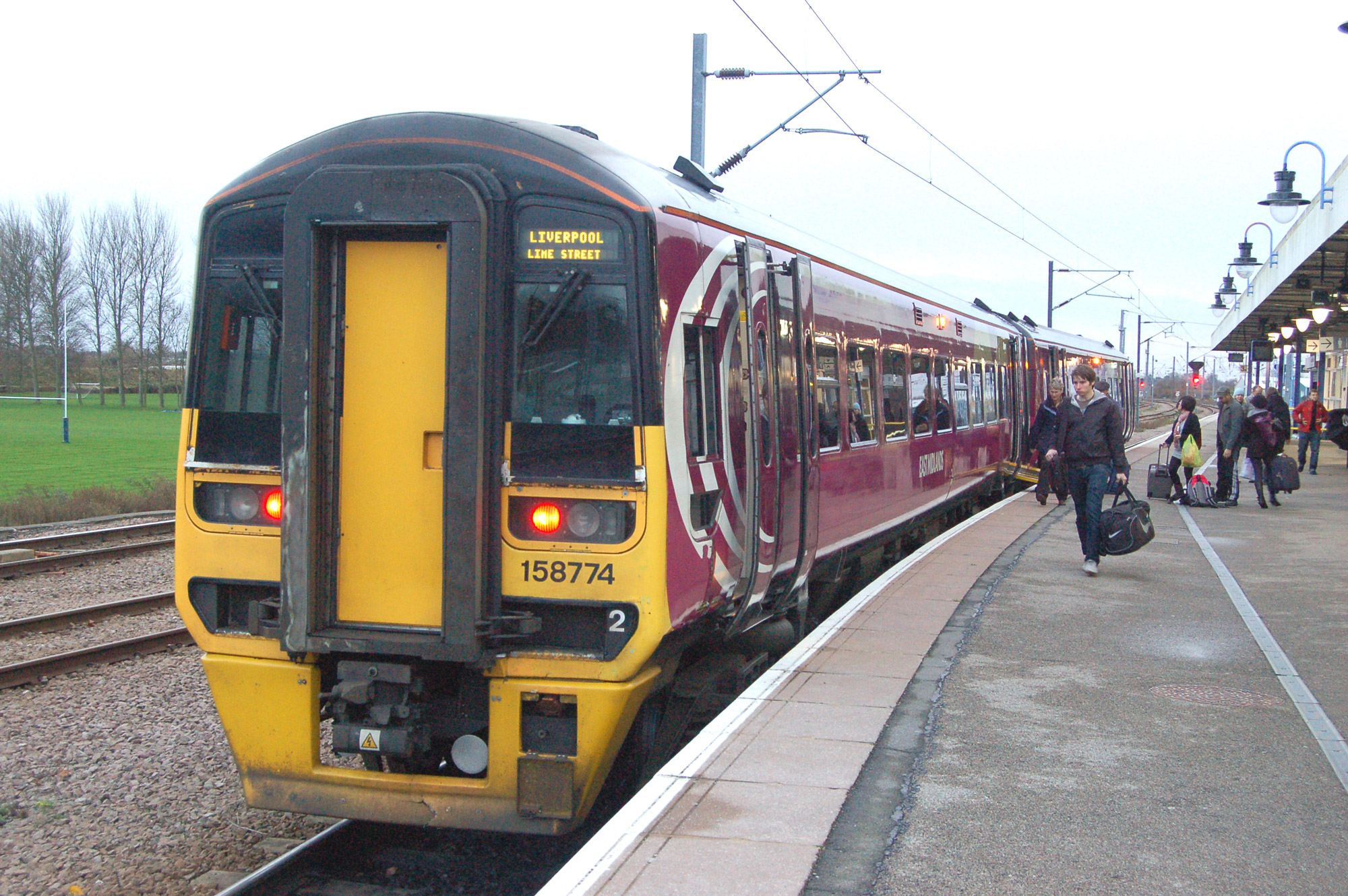
A Class 158 operated by East Midlands Trains stands at Ely station on a Norwich to Liverpool service

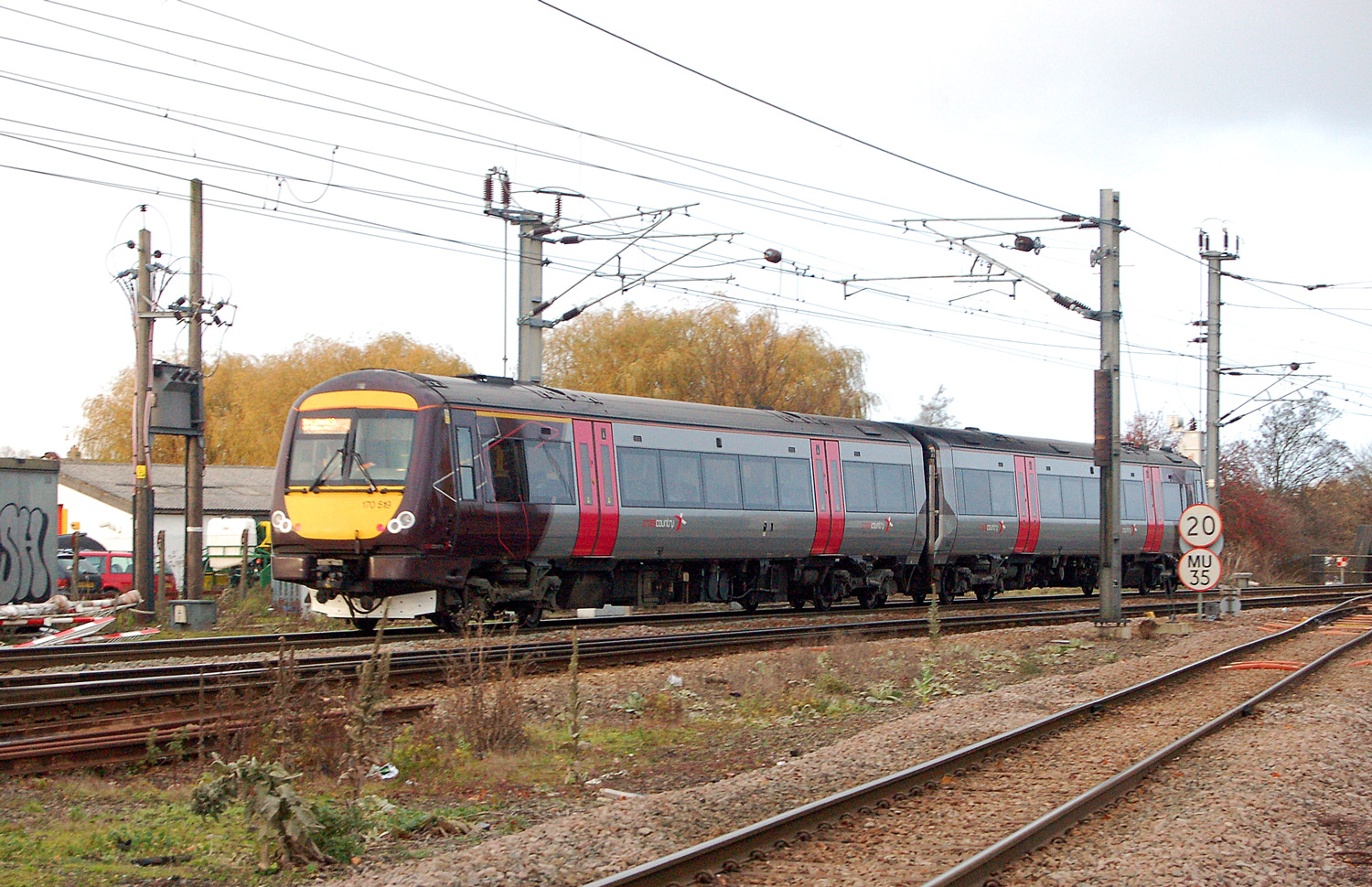
A Class 170 operated by CrossCountry approaching Ely station from the north

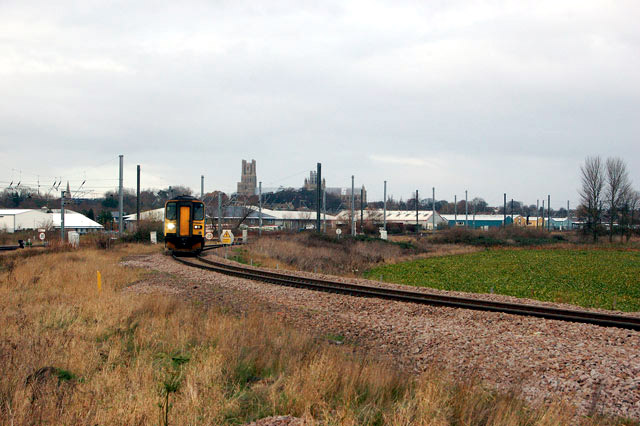
A Class 153 operated by Abellio Greater Anglia leaving Ely Dock Junction on a service to Ipswich with the ex-GER mainline in the background and Ely Cathedral on the skyline

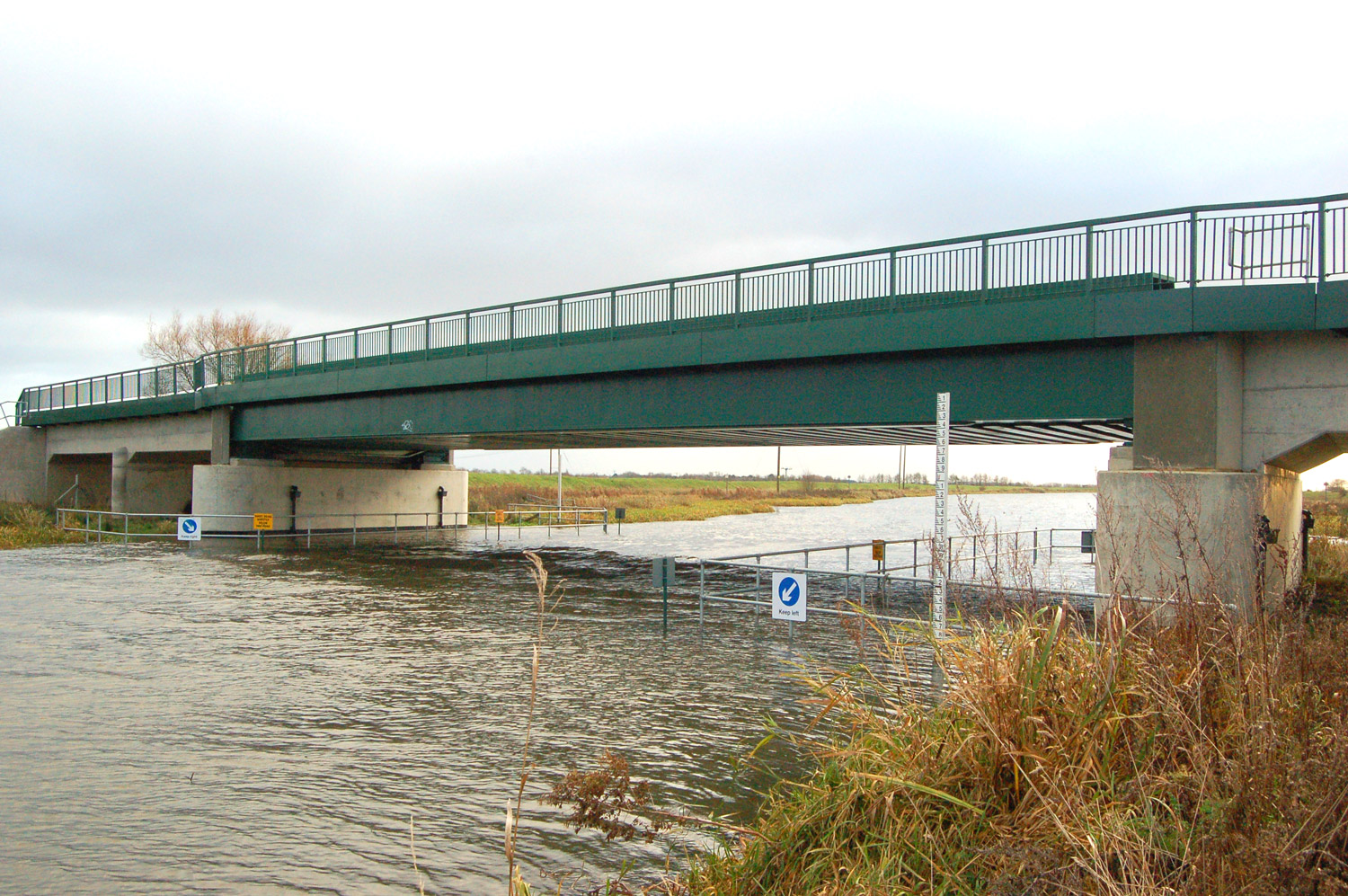
Rebuilt in 2007, Hawk Bridge carries the single-track Ely-Newmarket line over the River Great Ouse

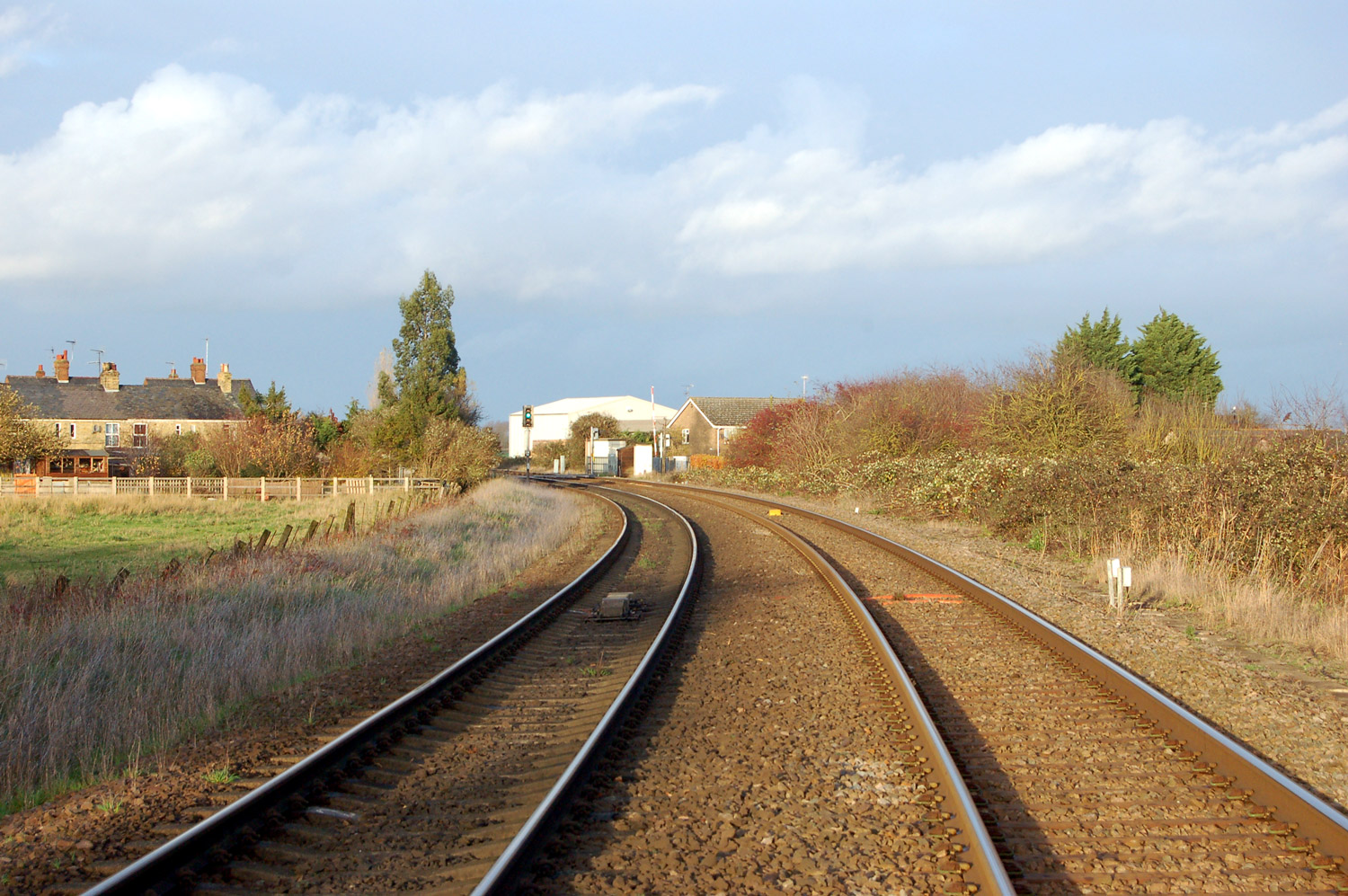
Looking in the down direction (towards March) on the Hereward Line north of Ely North Junction

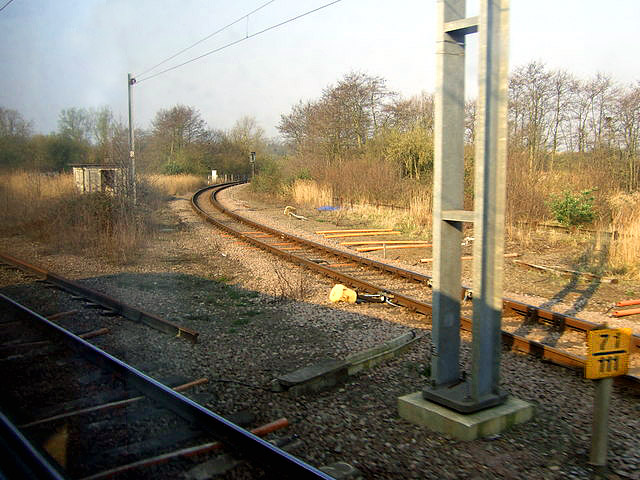
Ely West Curve (seen from a train window) branching west from Ely North Junction towards the Hereward Line

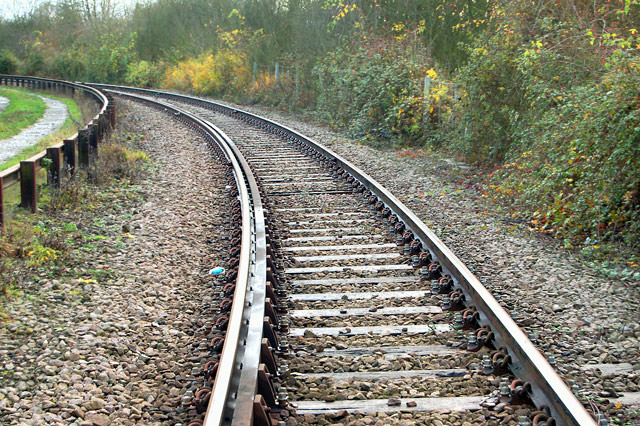
Ely West Curve looking towards Ely North Junction – note the tight radius of the curve necessitating a check rail

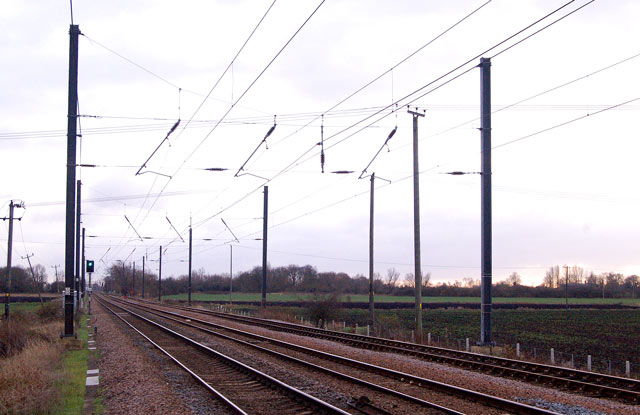
The electrified London to King's Lynn mainline south of Ely Dock Junction looking in the up direction (towards London)

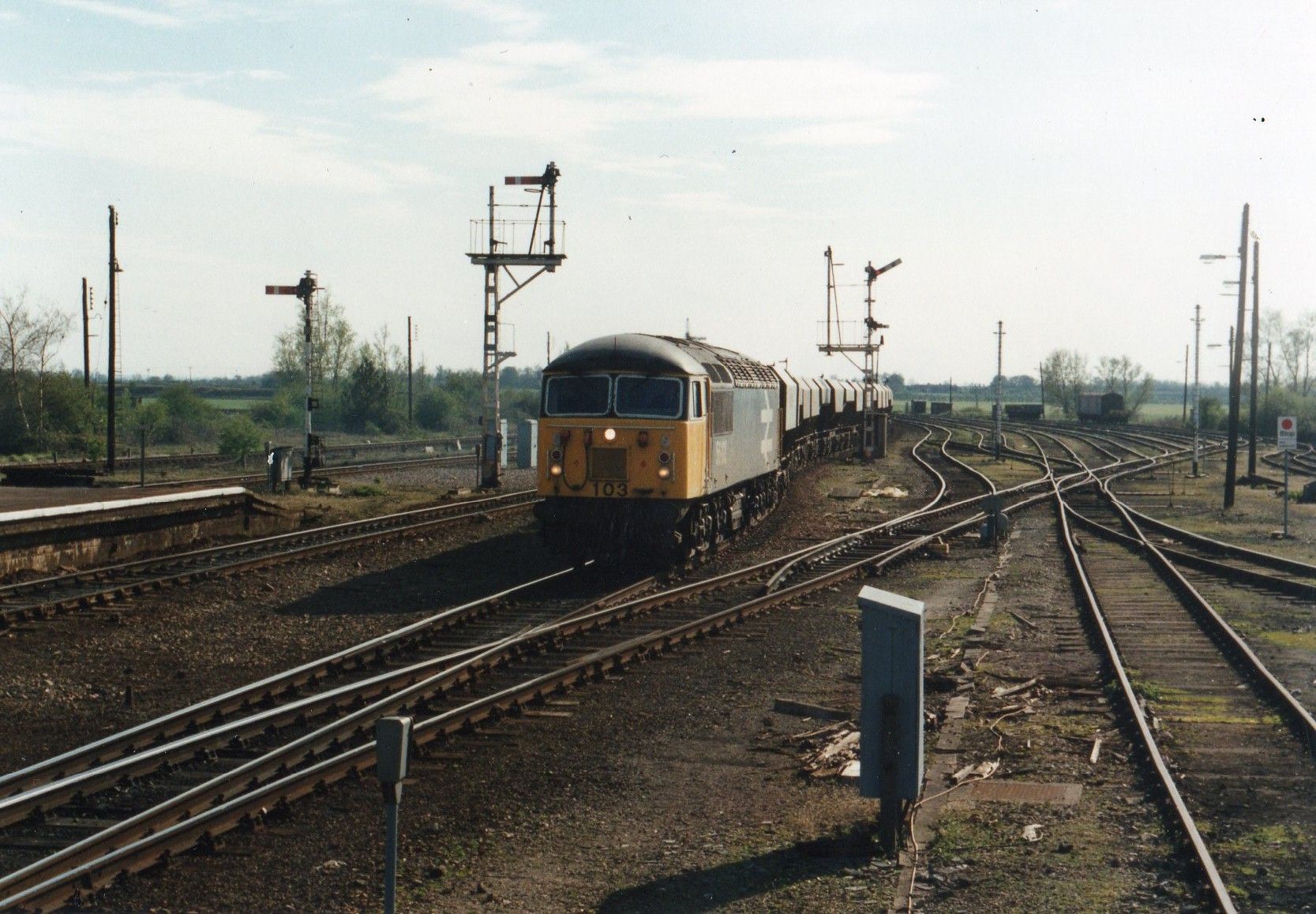
A class 56 heads a northbound aggregates train through Ely station. Note the semaphore signals which were removed during the electrification and resignalling scheme.

== References and sources ==
- British Railways Pre-Grouping Atlas and Gazetteer; W P Conolly; Ian Allan Ltd; published 1976; ISBN 0-7110-0320-3
- Ordnance Survey: Landranger map sheet 143 Ely & Wisbech ISBN 978-0-319-23131-9
- Ordnance Survey: Explorer map sheet 228 March & Ely ISBN 978-0-319-23802-8
- Ordnance Survey: Explorer map sheet 226 Ely & Newmarket ISBN 978-0-319-23800-4
- Ely to Norwich; Richard Adderson and Graham Kenworthy; Middleton Press; published 2002; ISBN 978-1-901706-90-1; Pages 1–7
- Eastern Main Lines – Cambridge to Ely; Richard Adderson and Graham Kenworthy; Middleton Press; published 2005; ISBN 978-1-904474-55-5
- Gordon, D.I. (1968). Volume V: The Eastern Counties. A Regional History of the Railways of Great Britain. David and Charles.
