= Queen Adelaide, Cambridgeshire =

Hamlet in Cambridgeshire, England

Coordinates: 52.4098°N 0.3022°E

Queen Adelaide
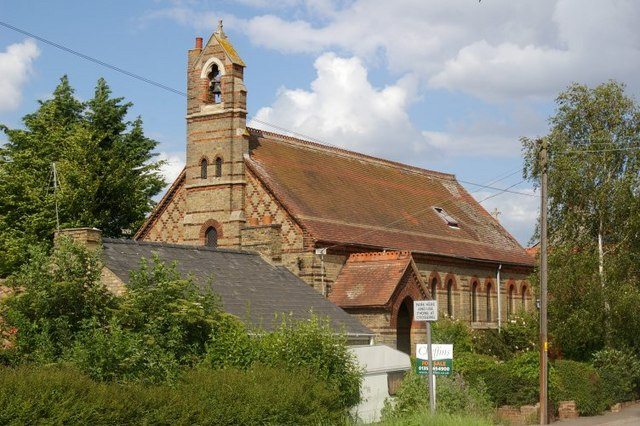
- Former chapel of St Etheldreda

- Location within Cambridgeshire
- OS grid reference: TL565814
- Civil parish: City of Ely
- District: East Cambridgeshire
- Shire county: Cambridgeshire
- Region: East
- Country: England
- Sovereign state: United Kingdom
- Post town: Ely
- Postcode district: CB7
- Dialling code: 01353
- Police: Cambridgeshire
- Fire: Cambridgeshire
- Ambulance: East of England
- UK Parliament: Ely and East Cambridgeshire

Queen Adelaide is a hamlet on the River Great Ouse in the Fens about 1 1/2 miles (2.4 km) northeast of Ely, Cambridgeshire, England.

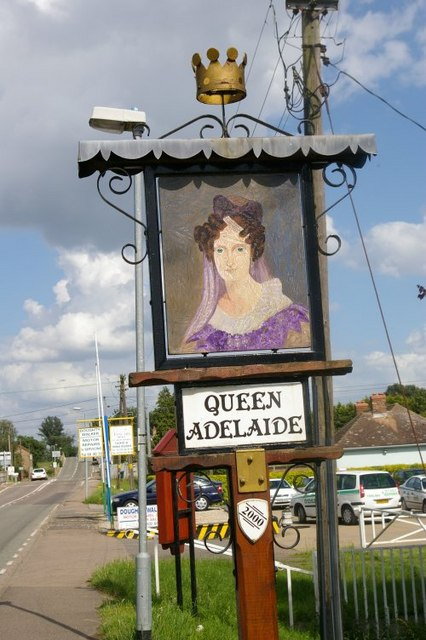
Queen Adelaide sign in the hamlet

The hamlet is named after a pub, which in turn was named after the British queen Adelaide of Saxe-Meiningen. The hamlet did not exist until the 19th century, when the railways reached Ely and the pub was built.

The B1382 road is Queen Adelaide's main street. South of the hamlet is a junction of three railways: the Fen, Breckland and Ely to Peterborough railway lines. Each of the three lines crosses the hamlet's main street with a separate level crossing. West of the hamlet there is also a loop line, the Adelaide Loop, that the B1382 crosses on a bridge.

The River Great Ouse is just to the east, and the section flowing north from the Queen Adelaide Bridge to the Sandhill Bridge at Littleport is known as the Adelaide straight, completed in 1829; it has been used as an emergency alternative to the River Thames for the Boat Race in 1944, and again in 2021, when Hammersmith Bridge in London was closed to river traffic.

Queen Adelaide is in the Church of England parish of Ely Cathedral, which is 2 miles (3 km) away by road, so in 1883 a chapel of ease was built in the hamlet. It was dedicated to St Etheldreda, who was a 7th-century East Anglian princess and Abbess of Ely. More recently the chapel has been deconsecrated and converted into a private house.

== Sources ==
- Atkinson, T.D.; Hampson, Ethel M.; Long, E.T.; Meekings, C.A.F.; Miller, Edward; Wells, H.B.; Woodgate, G.M.G. (2002). Pugh, R.B. (ed.). A History of the County of Cambridge and the Isle of Ely. Victoria County History. Vol. 4: City of Ely, Ely, N. and S. Witchford and Wisbech Hundreds. London: Oxford University Press for the University of London Institute of Historical Research. pp. 28–33, 45–47, 82–86 – via British History Online.
