= Ely railway station =

Railway station in Cambridgeshire, England

Coordinates: 52°23′25″N 0°15′59″E

Ely

General information
- Location: Ely, East Cambridgeshire; England
- Grid reference: TL542793
- Manager: Greater Anglia
- Platforms: 3

Other information
- Station code: ELY
- Classification: DfT category D

History
- Opened: 30 July 1845.

Passengers
- 2020–21: ▼0.577 million
- Interchange: ▼74,729
- 2021–22: ▲1.635 million
- Interchange: ▲0.273 million
- 2022–23: ▲1.894 million
- Interchange: ▲0.345 million
- 2023–24: ▲2.052 million
- Interchange: ▲0.399 million
- 2024–25: ▲2.299 million
- Interchange: ▲0.431 million
Location
Notes
- Passenger statistics from the Office of Rail and Road

Ely railway station is on the Fen line in the east of England, serving the cathedral city of Ely, Cambridgeshire. It is 70 miles 30 chains (113.3 km) from London Liverpool Street and is situated between Waterbeach and Littleport stations on the Fen line to King's Lynn. It is an important junction for three other lines: the Ely to Peterborough Line, the Ipswich to Ely Line and the Norwich to Ely line.

Ely is a busy station with trains running to a variety of destinations including London, Cambridge, King's Lynn, Birmingham, Nottingham, Sheffield, Manchester and Liverpool. It is managed by Greater Anglia, which is also one of four train operators that serve the station, the others being Great Northern, CrossCountry and East Midlands Railway.

The station was opened on 30 July 1845 by the Eastern Counties Railway at a cost of £81,500; the land on which it was built being a marshy swamp. The station was modified substantially by British Rail in the early 1990s, at the time that electrification of the line was taking place.

== Description ==
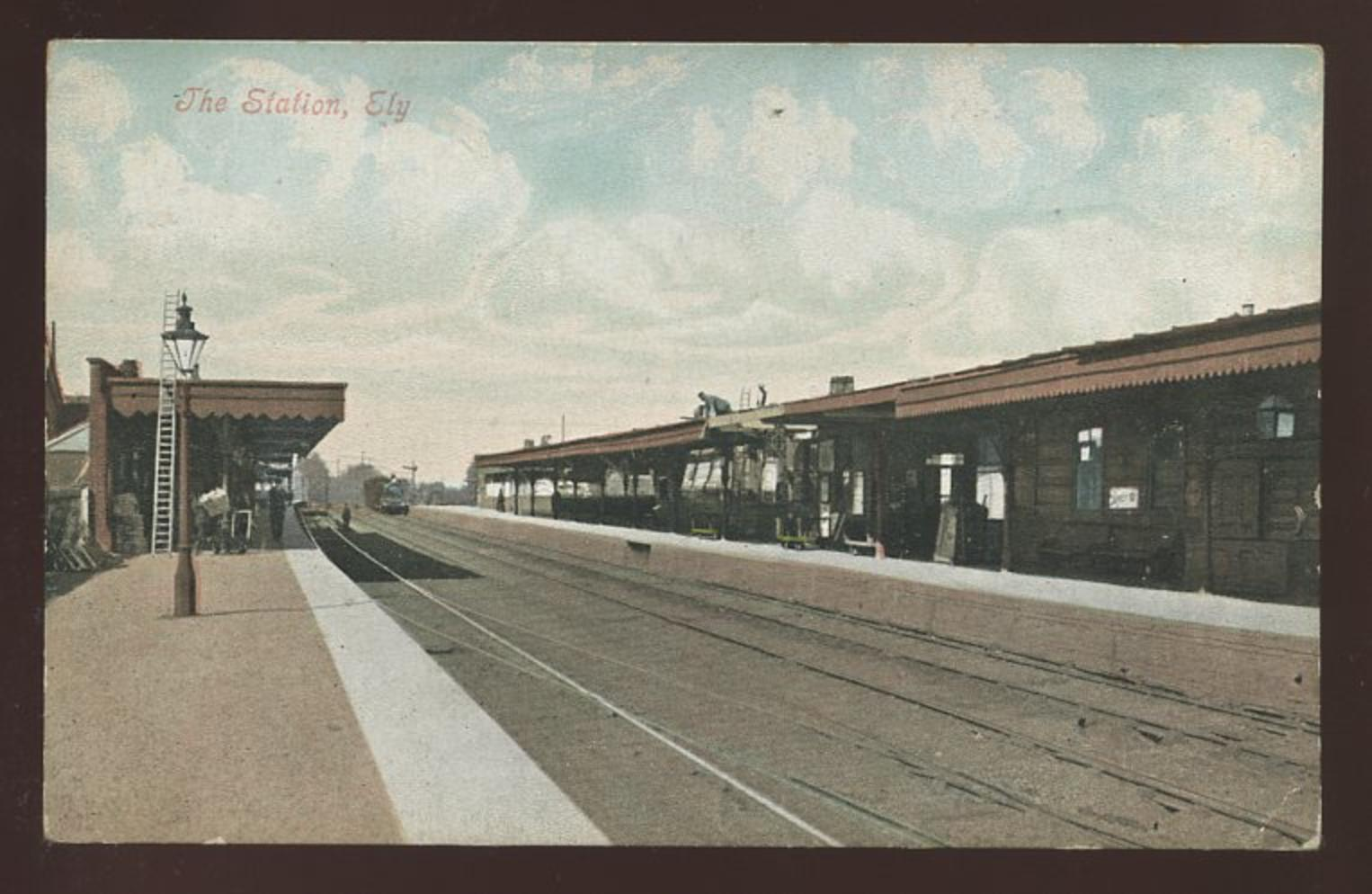
Ely station looking north in June 1905

The station building was designed by Francis Thompson although Sancton Wood as chief architect is often given credit. On opening the station building had two Italianate towers – one at the north end and the other above the booking office. There were two cubed pavilions either side of an arcade. When the station opened it had three platforms and these were linked by a footbridge to the south of the station buildings. This footbridge was later replaced (sometime before 1902) by a substantial brick footbridge located at the north end of the station but by 1925 a subway had been constructed and this is in use today (2025).

In the 1920s there were carriage sidings to the east of the station which were used by stock for local all stations trains towards Newmarket, Peterborough, King's Lynn and Norwich Thorpe. The engine shed and goods yard were located south of the station and a level crossing was located immediately north of the station. The level crossing existed because the underbridge had limited clearance so taller lorries had to travel this way sometimes causing delays to the railway services.

The station was rebuilt in 1929/1930 by the LNER in a similar style and it is suspected that the towers were removed at that time. While the rest of the structures remained intact, during the remodelling in the 1990s the space for three tracks between the platforms (the third track had been removed some years earlier) was reduced to two and the lines through the station were electrified. On 1 November 2018 following the opening of the Ely bypass, the level crossing immediately north of the station was closed to road traffic.

One and a half miles north of the station the line splits three ways with the lines towards March and Peterborough, King's Lynn, and Norwich. There is also a loop that allows for traffic from the King's Lynn and Norwich lines a direct route to March and Peterborough that diverges here and joins the Peterborough line at Ely West Junction.

== Services ==
=== July 1922 ===
All services in 1922 were operated by the Great Eastern Railway. Ely was the start point for some local stopping services to March, Newmarket, King's Lynn and Norwich, as well as the branch line to St. Ives. As a result, there were some carriage sidings on the east side of the station where stock for these was stabled overnight.

Longer distance services all called at Ely, although one exception was the 11:20 London St Pancras – King's Lynn and Hunstanton. The GER had running rights into St. Pancras, via Tottenham and Hampstead, and it was used by them when running royal trains to Sandringham which was located on the Hunstanton line. Most London trains originated from Liverpool Street station.

Some trains, such as the 11:50 Liverpool Street service, arrived at Ely at 13:34 and split into Hunstanton and Norwich portions. Pullman cars and restaurant cars would have been seen on the longer distance trains operating through the area at this time.

A number of services to and from the Norwich line avoided the station completely, by being routed via the West Curve; this was unlike 2020, where nearly all services call at Ely and reverse.

Ely was served by the Hook Continental service from Harwich Parkeston Quay to various destinations in the North and Midlands.

By 1920, standard service levels were low and on Sunday there were few trains running; for example, on the King's Lynn line, there was one departure to Hunstanton departing Ely at 12:00 and one to King's Lynn at 17:40.

=== Present day ===
The station is served by four operators, their off peak services in trains per hour (tph) are as follows:

Greater Anglia:

- 1 tph to Norwich, via the Breckland Line (semi-fast).
- 1 tph to Stansted Airport, via the West Anglia Main Line (semi-fast). Some of these services terminate at Cambridge.
- 1 tp2h to Peterborough (semi-fast).
- 1 tp2h to Ipswich (semi-fast).

Services use three/four-car Class 755 rolling stock.

During weekday peak hours there are 6 trains per day to London Liverpool St (semi-fast). These services use Class 720 units.

CrossCountry:

- 1 tph to Birmingham New Street, via Leicester (semi-fast).
- 1 tph to Stansted Airport (semi-fast). some off-peak services terminate at Cambridge.

These services are operated using two or three-car Class 170 diesel multiple units.

Great Northern:

- 2 tph to London Kings Cross, all stations to Cambridge South, then non-stop.
- 1 tph to Kings Lynn, via the Fen Line (all stations). At peak times this increases to 2 tph.

A mix of four-car Class 379 and Class 387 electric multiple units are used; however, these often run as eight-car double units or 12-car triple units during peak times.

East Midlands Railway:

- 1 tph to Liverpool Lime St, via Peterborough, Nottingham, Sheffield and Manchester Piccadilly (semi-fast).
- 1 tph to Norwich (semi-fast).

These services use 2-car Class 158 DMUs, or occasionally Class 170 Units.

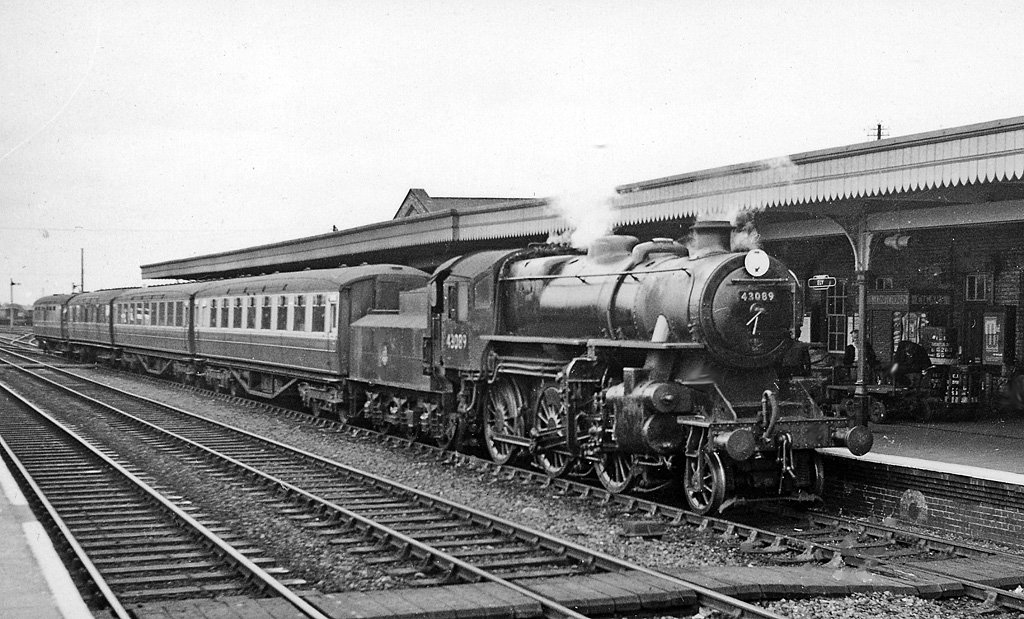
The Hunstanton portion of the 10.39 service from Liverpool Street at Ely in August 1958

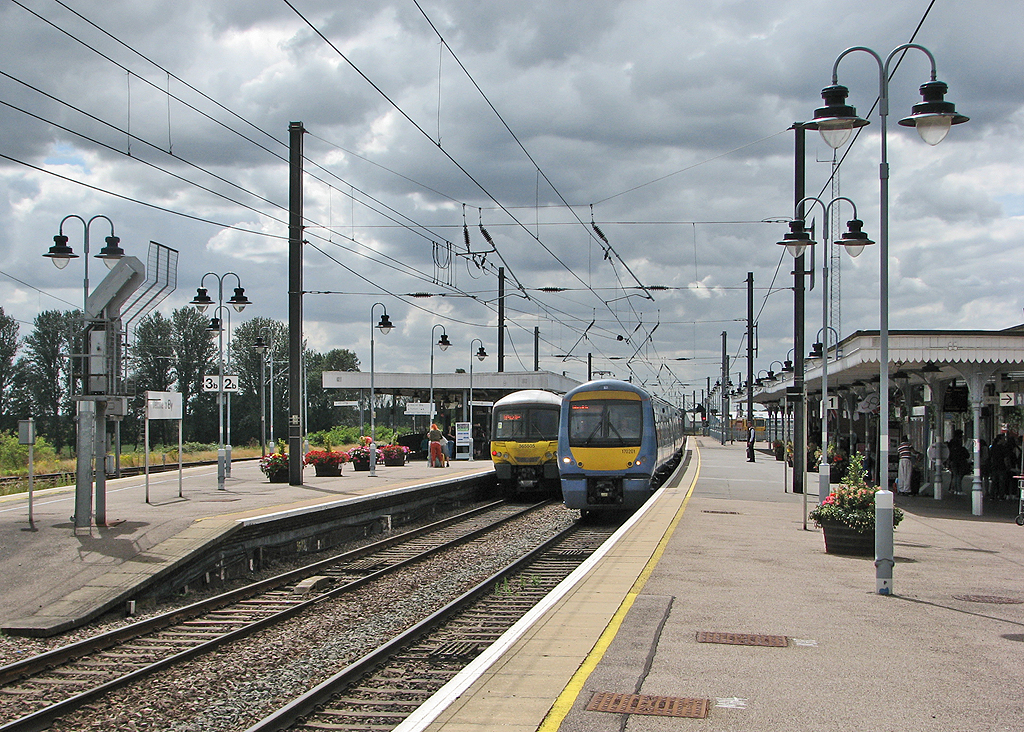
Trains in the station platforms in August 2016

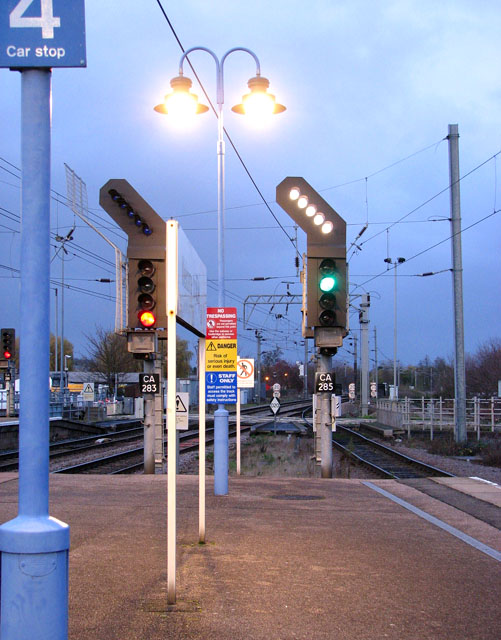
Ely railway station signals in November 2009

=== Summary ===
Preceding station	National Rail	Following station
Cambridge	CrossCountry Stansted Airport–Birmingham New Street Line	March
Cambridge	CrossCountry Stansted Airport–Birmingham New Street Line	Manea Limited service
Thetford	East Midlands Railway Norwich–Liverpool Lime Street Line	Peterborough
Brandon Limited service	East Midlands Railway Norwich–Liverpool Lime Street Line	March Limited service
Waterbeach	Great Northern King's Lynn–Cambridge	Littleport
Waterbeach	Greater Anglia London Liverpool Street–Norwich Line Peak only	Terminus
Cambridge North	Greater Anglia Norwich–Cambridge	Brandon
Cambridge North	Greater Anglia Norwich–Cambridge	Shippea Hill Limited service
Soham	Greater Anglia Ipswich–Peterborough Line	Manea
	Future Services	
Cambridge	East West Rail; Oxford–Norwich	Norwich
Historical railways
Soham Line and station open	Great Eastern Railway Ely and Newmarket Railway	Terminus
Chettisham Line open, station closed	Great Eastern Railway Ely to Peterborough Line	Terminus
Disused railways
Stretham Line and station closed	Great Eastern Railway Ely and St Ives Railway	Terminus

== Retail ==
There is one branch of Locoespresso on Platform 1, which serves hot and cold drinks, as well as snacks, magazines and newspapers. Platform 1 also has an L.A. Golden Bean kiosk, which sells hot & cold drinks and snacks.

== Operations ==
=== Accidents and incidents ===
- On 25 August 1866, a passenger train derailed near Ely due to defective track. One person was killed and five were seriously injured.
- On 1 June 1870, a passenger train was derailed near Ely. Some passengers sustained minor injuries.
- On 2 April 1874, two freight trains collided at Ely.
- On 16 January 1890, a train from Newmarket ran into the rear of a freight train near Ely.
- On 26 September 1905, a freight train derailed at Dock Junction, fouling the adjacent line. A passenger train collided with derailed wagons. Four passengers were injured, one seriously.
- On 22 June 2007, a goods train derailed at Hawk Bridge which carries the Ipswich line over the River Great Ouse a mile south of Ely. Photographs showed derailed wagons on their side, only prevented from plunging off the embankment by subsidiary structures and their attachment to the rest of the train. As a consequence of the derailment the bridge had to be rebuilt and there were no train services between Ely and Bury St. Edmunds until the works were completed on 21 December 2007.
- On 14 August 2017, a freight train was derailed at Ely West Junction, near Queen Adelaide. The line between Ely and Peterborough was closed until 21 August.

=== Engine shed ===
Opened in 1847, the shed would have housed locomotives for some of the local all-stations services operating around Ely. A shed was employed from opening but this was replaced by a second structure in 1867.

This was a single road engine shed located on the up side, south of the station. The shed was a corrugated iron affair and a timber coaling stage allowed coaling of trains by hand. There was a turntable which was provided from opening and replaced by a 45-foot turntable in 1879 and, as loco designs got bigger, this in turn was replaced by a 55-foot turntable in 1912.

A short siding extended from the loco yard to a small dock on the river.

In July 1922, the allocation was:

Class (LNER classification)	Wheel Arrangement	Number allocated
D13	4-4-0	3
D14	4-4-0	1
J15	0-6-0	6
J69	0-6-0T	1

The D13/D14 class were employed on local passenger services, with some of the J15 0-6-0s which would have also worked freight trains. The J69 tank engine was employed to shunt the goods yard and station area.

It is unclear when the shed was demolished, but steam locomotives continued to use the site until the end of 1962. After that, an outbased Cambridge diesel shunter took care of shunting duties in the area until the early 1990s; when not in use, this was stabled in a short siding adjacent to the station.

=== Signalling ===
The list below shows the signal boxes operating in the Ely area when the area was controlled by manually operated by semaphore signals. The boxes are listed south to north.

Name	Remarks	Closed
Sutton Branch Junction	Junction for St Ives Line and opened in 1866 with that line. After closure the junction was worked by Ely Dock Junction	17 July 1932
Ely Dock Junction	Junction for Newmarket Line. The first box (50 levers) was located west of the line and this was replaced in 1928 on the opposite side. By 1932 this had 82 levers	23–25 April 1992
Ely South	Controlled the south end of Ely station	29 June 1985
Ely North	Ely Station North was opened in 1880 and was a Great Eastern Railway Type 2 design built by Stevens & Sons. It opened fitted with a 37 lever Stevens & Sons Tappet frame which was extended to 41 levers (possibly in LNER days).	10 April 1992 - demolished on 27–29 April 1992.
Ely South Junction	This short-lived box controlled the south entrance to sidings that existed just south of Ely North Junction. These were used to reverse Norwich/King's Lynn line to March trains before the West Curve opened. The location also had a turntable for turning locomotives	1890
Ely North Junction	The two boxes located at Ely North Junction were the busiest of the Ely boxes, controlling the triple junction and, from 1890, both ends of the West Curve which allowed trains to run direct between Norwich and Peterborough instead of reversing at Ely station. the first box was opened in 1874 and was a Saxby & Farmer/Great Eastern type 1 design of wooden construction. By the mid-1920s the box was supported by a brace and with the decision to build a new sugar beet factory on land to the east of the line, the LNER replaced the box with a new brick built box,(LNER Type 11a) which also controlled the entry to the sugar factory beet sidings.	April 1992
Adelaide	15 levers - located on the King's Lynn line by the B1382 level crossing. Control passed to Ely North Junction.	3 November 1930
Ely West Junction	Opened 1890 to operate the connection from the March Line to the West Curve. Control passed to Ely North Junction.	3 November 1930

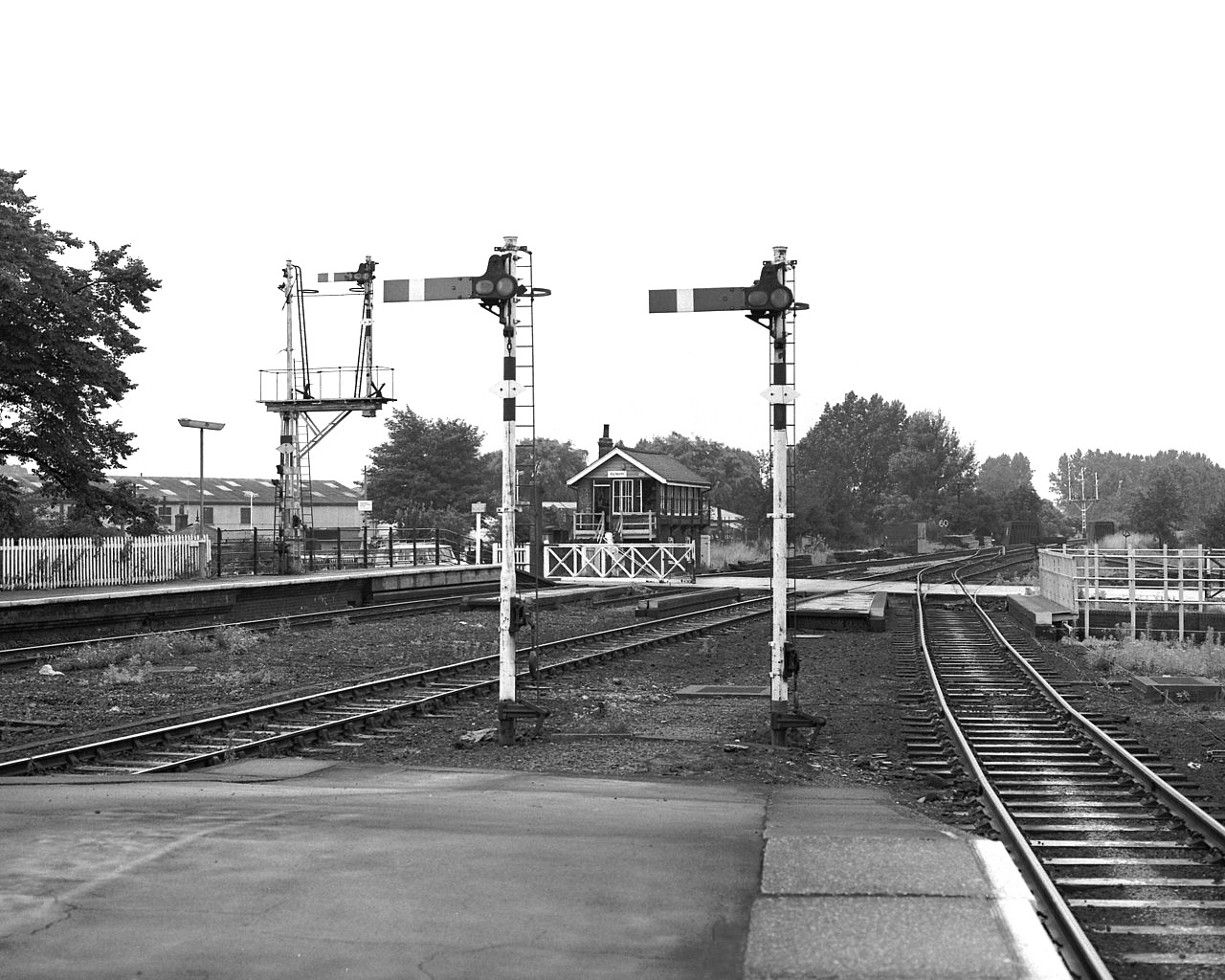
Ely Station North signal box, level crossing and semaphore signals

The station area is currently (2020) controlled by Cambridge Power Signal Box.

== See also ==
- Railways in Ely
