= Holme railway station (Norfolk) =

Former railway station in England

Coordinates: 52.6576°N 0.3783°E

Holme
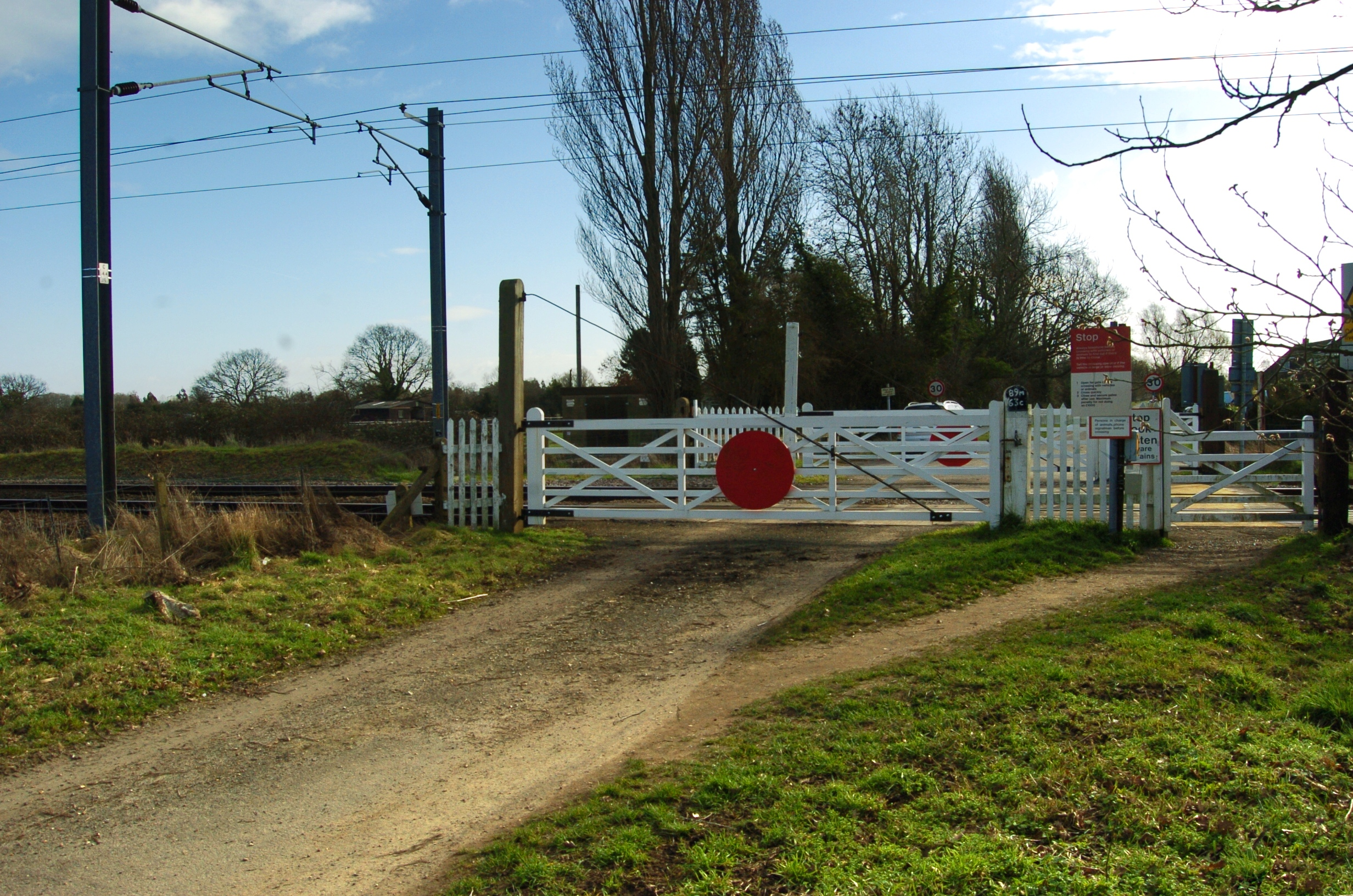
- Level crossing very close to the site of Holme railway station.

General information
- Location: Runcton Holme, King's Lynn and West Norfolk; England

Other information
- Status: Disused

History
- Original company: Lynn and Ely Railway

Key dates
- 27 October 1846: Opened as Holme Gate
- November 1847: Renamed Holme
- March 1853: Closed
Location

Holme railway station was located on the line between Stow Bardolph and Watlington in Norfolk, England. It served the parish of Runcton Holme, and closed in 1853.

== History ==
The Lynn and Ely Railway Act 1845 (8 & 9 Vict. c. lv) received royal assent on 30 June 1845. Work started on the line in 1846 and the line and its stations were opened on 27 October 1846. Holme Gate Station opened with the line and was situated South of St. Germain's Station and north of Stow Station. The line ran from Ely to Downham, the eventual destination being Ely.

Preceding station	Historical railways	Following station
Stow Bardolph; Line open, station closed	Great Eastern Railway; Fen Line	Watlington; Line and station open
