= Waterbeach railway station =

Railway station in Cambridgeshire, England

Coordinates: 52.262°N 0.197°E

Waterbeach
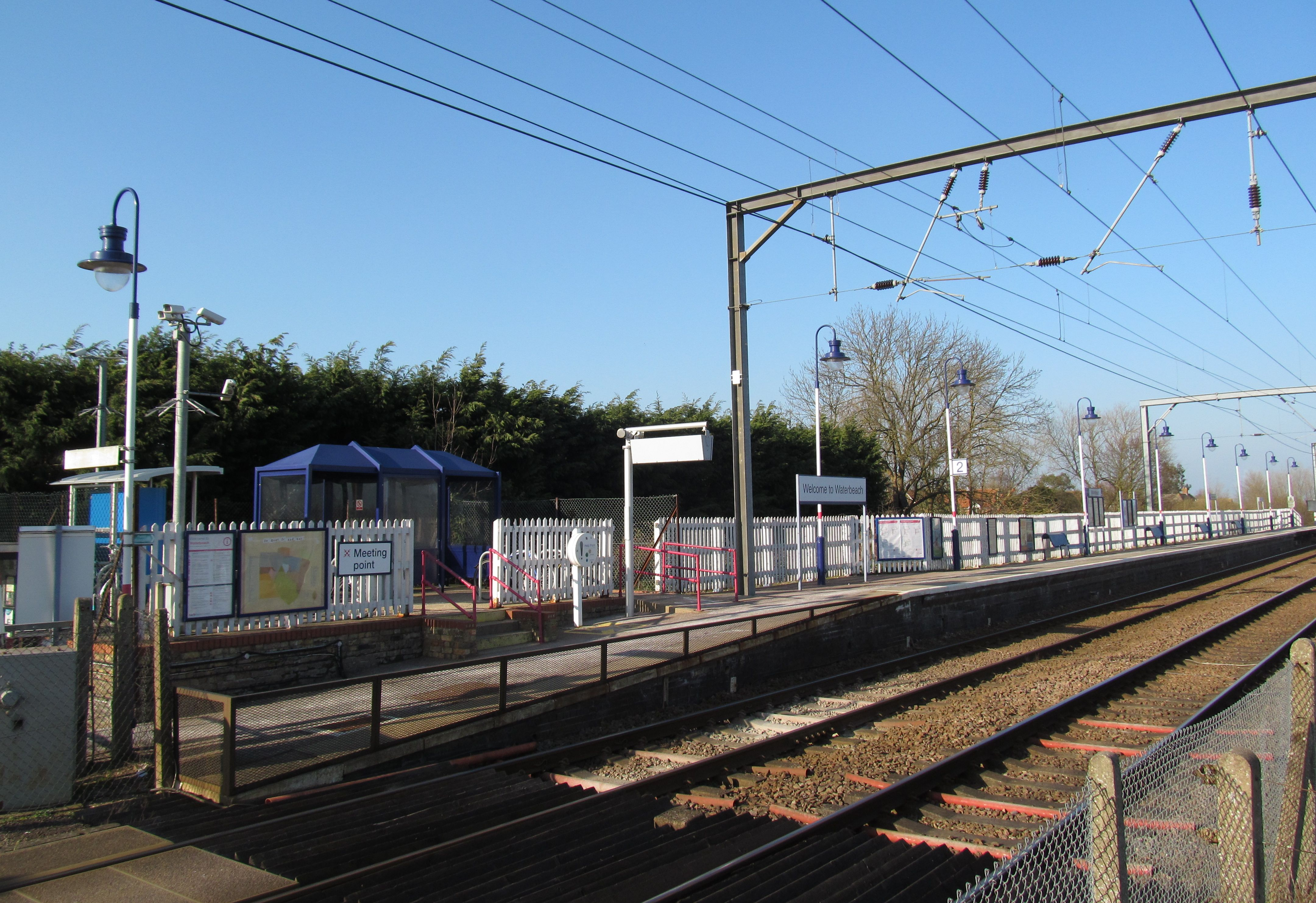
- The northbound platform at Waterbeach in March 2014

General information
- Location: Waterbeach, South Cambridgeshire; England
- Grid reference: TL500650
- Owner: Network Rail
- Manager: Great Northern
- Platforms: 2

Other information
- Station code: WBC
- Classification: DfT category F2

History
- Original company: Eastern Counties Railway
- Pre-grouping: Great Eastern Railway
- Post-grouping: London and North Eastern Railway

Key dates
- 30 July 1845: Opened

Passengers
- 2020–21: ▼0.100 million
- 2021–22: ▲0.265 million
- 2022–23: ▲0.309 million
- 2023–24: ▲0.332 million
- 2024–25: ▲0.372 million
Location
Notes
- Passenger statistics from the Office of Rail and Road

Waterbeach railway station is on the Fen line in the east of England, serving the village of Waterbeach, Cambridgeshire. It is 61 miles 1 chain (98.2 km) measured from London Liverpool Street and 63 miles 29 chains (102 km) from London King's Cross; it is situated between Cambridge North and Ely stations. Its three-letter station code is WBC.

The station and most trains calling are operated by Great Northern, with limited peak services being operated by Greater Anglia.

Waterbeach station is unstaffed, and has only basic waiting shelters on each of the two platforms. All the station buildings have been demolished. The platforms are staggered on each side of a half barrier level crossing. Until electrification and the automation of the crossing, the platforms were located opposite each other.

Waterbeach railway station is planned to be relocated north to support the development of the Waterbeach New Town, with completion expected by 2027.

== History ==
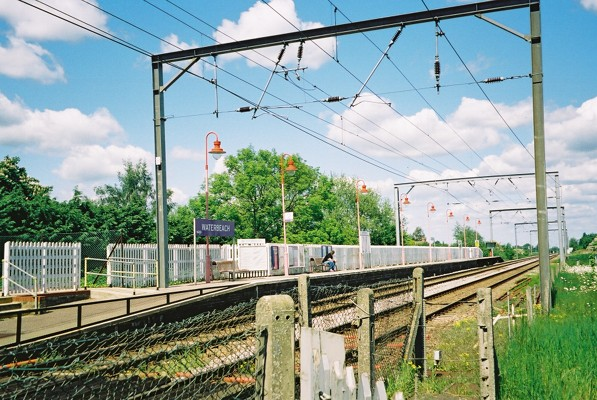
The northbound platform in May 2004

Before electrification, British Rail services often did not stop at Waterbeach; or if they did, stops would be unofficial. However, since electrification, virtually all King's Lynn/Ely - Cambridge/London services have stopped there (the present timetable shows only three Monday - Friday in both directions not stopping there) passenger numbers surged, with people all across the area north of Cambridge in South Cambridgeshire using it as their primary station. As a result, passenger numbers are nearly as high as Downham Market, and the station sees a lot of parking problems.

== Future relocation ==
Waterbeach railway station is planned to be relocated approximately 1.5 miles (2.4 kilometres) north of its current location to support the development of a new town on the former Waterbeach Barracks site. The new station will be closer to the planned housing development, which is expected to include 8,000 to 9,000 homes.

The relocation was originally to be managed by the developer, but the Greater Cambridge Partnership (GCP) assumed responsibility for the project in 2022 after the developer was unable to secure commercial funding. Funding includes a £23 million repayable grant from Homes England and a £20 million contribution from the GCP. Planning permission for the station was granted in 2020. Construction started in November 2026, with the station opening in 2028.

The station will be connected to a new travel hub including 1,600 spaces, a busway between Waterbeach and Cambridge and new walking and cycling routes. The new station itself is expected to have electric parking spaces, wider platforms, an accessible footbridge and lifts and 100 cycle spaces.

The old station is expected to stay open until the new station is complete. However, some local residents feel that the closure and relocation to the new location will isolate some residents, halve rail journeys in the village, increase car usage and are campaigning to keep the old station open. Whilst they are not opposed to the new station opening, they want services to call at both stations, and the Department for Transport are expected to consult on this option.

== Services ==
Great Northern operate all off-peak services at Waterbeach using a mix of Class 387 and Class 379 EMUs . Greater Anglia operate select peak time services to London Liverpool Street, using Class 720 EMUs.

Great Northern's typical off-peak service in trains per hour (tph) is:

- 2 tph to London King's Cross (non-stop from Cambridge South). During peak times, these services call additionally at Royston and Letchworth Garden City.
- 2 tph to Ely of which 1 continues to King's Lynn. During peak times both trains continue to King's Lynn.

6 Greater Anglia services extend from Cambridge North to Ely each day.

Preceding station	National Rail	Following station
Cambridge North	Great Northern Fen Line	Ely
