= Stow Bardolph railway station =

Former railway station in England

Coordinates: 52.6374°N 0.3726°E

Stow Bardolph
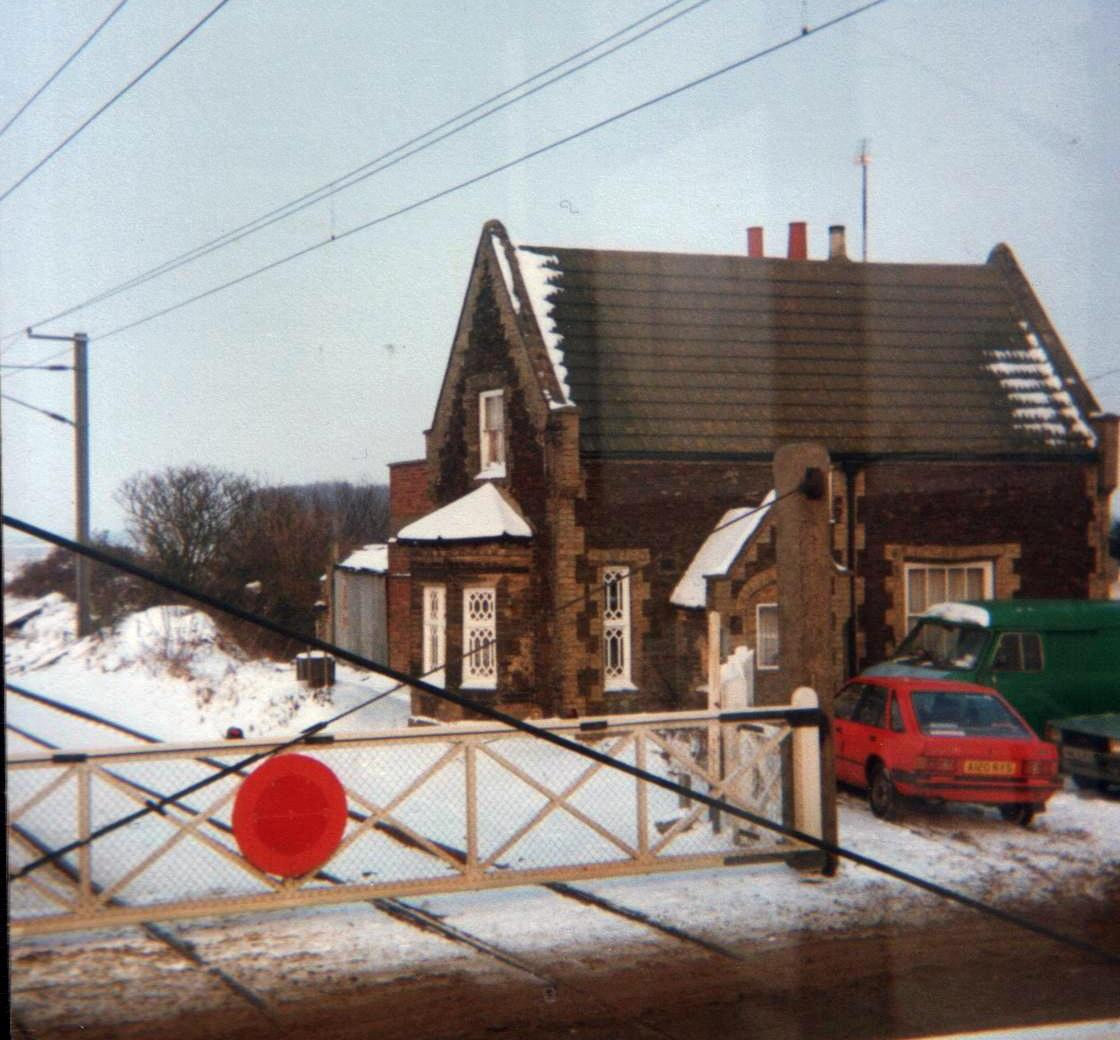
- Stow Bardolph's surviving station building in 1991 (still extant today).

General information
- Location: Stow Bardolph, King's Lynn and West Norfolk; England
- Grid reference: TF606070
- Platforms: 2

Other information
- Status: Disused

History
- Original company: Lynn and Ely Railway
- Pre-grouping: Great Eastern Railway
- Post-grouping: London and North Eastern Railway

Key dates
- 27 Oct 1846: Opened as Stow
- 1 Jul 1923: Renamed; Stow Bardolph
- 4 Nov 1963: Closed for passengers
- 13 July 1964: closed for freight
Location

Stow Bardolph railway station, in the parish of Stow Bardolph, Norfolk, served the villages of Stow Bardolph and Stowbridge. It closed in 1963.

Preceding station	Historical railways	Following station
Downham Market; Line and station open	Great Eastern Railway; Fen Line	Holme; Line open, station closed

The Lynn and Ely Railway Act 1845 (8 & 9 Vict. c. lv) received royal assent on 30 June 1845. Work started on the line in 1846 and the line and its stations were opened on 27 October 1846. Stow Station opened with the line and was situated South of Holme Gate Station and north of Downham Station. The line ran from Ely to Downham, the eventual destination being Ely.
