= Holme railway station =

Holme railway station may refer to:

- Holme railway station (Cambridgeshire)
- Holme railway station (Lancashire)
- Holme railway station (Norfolk)
