= Hawk Bridge =

Bridge in Cambridgeshire, England

Coordinates: 52.37993°N 0.26492°E

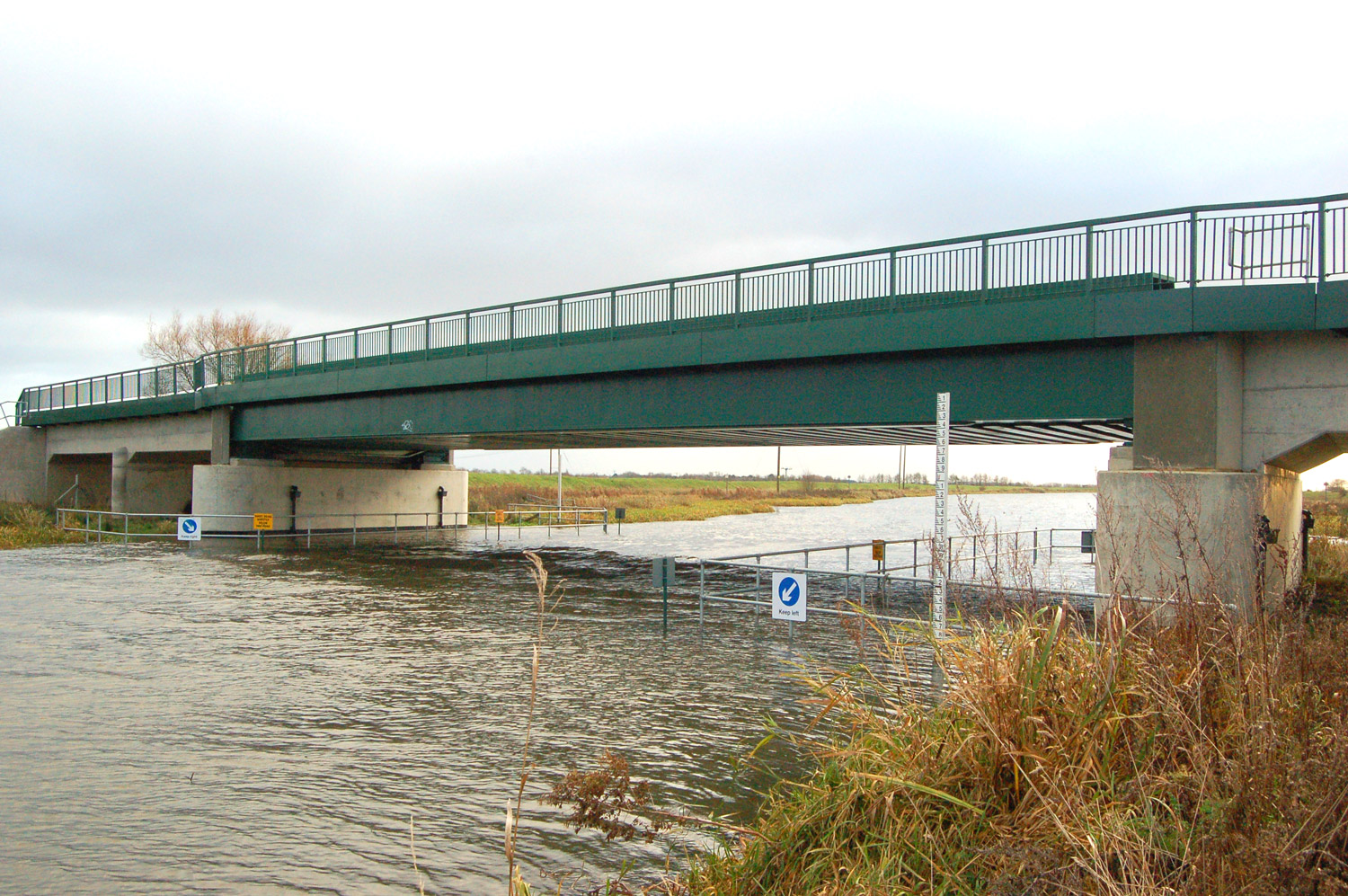
Rebuilt in 2007, Hawk Bridge carries the single-track Ely-Ipswich line over the River Great Ouse

Hawk Bridge, Ely, is a railway bridge carrying the Ipswich to Ely line across the River Great Ouse in Cambridgeshire, England. The bridge is located half a mile east of Ely Dock Junction. Hawk Bridge was rebuilt in 2007 following the derailment of a freight train.

== See also ==
- Railways in Ely
- Ely railway station
