= St Andrew's Church, South Runcton =

Church of St Andrew, South Runcton
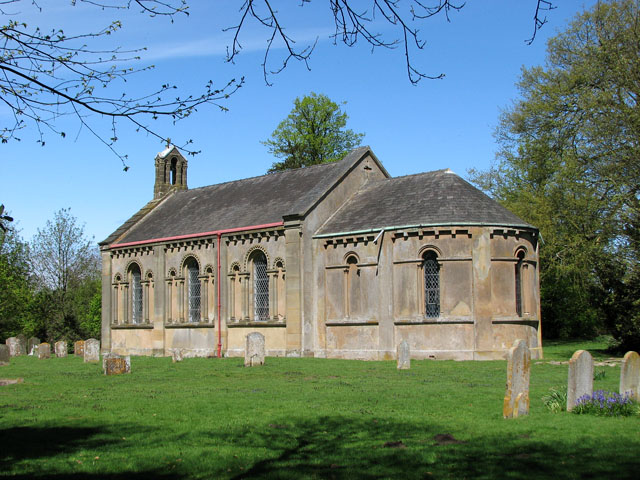

- Location in Norfolk
- 52.6535°N 0.416°E
- Location: South Runcton, Norfolk, England

History
- Built: 12th century
- Rebuilt: 1838-39

Site notes
- Architect: John Brown
- Governing body: Friends of Friendless Churches

Listed Building – Grade II*
- Official name: St Andrew's Church, South Runcton
- Designated: 8 July 1959
- Reference no.: 1342289

St Andrew's is a redundant church in the village of South Runcton, Norfolk, England (grid reference TF635089). Dating from the 12th century, the church was almost entirely rebuilt between 1838 and 1839 by John Brown, the surveyor of Norwich Cathedral. It is recorded in the National Heritage List for England as a designated Grade II* listed building and is under the care of the Friends of Friendless Churches.

== History ==
The Church of St Andrew dates from the early 12th century. Almost nothing of this original church now remains. When the artist John Sell Cotman sketched the church in 1812 it was in complete ruin. (Note: John Sell Cotman's sketch was dedicated to the Rev. Robert Forby, vicar of the nearby parish of Fincham.) In the 1830s, the Norwich Diocesan architect John Brown was engaged to undertake a rebuilding. Bill Wilson, writing in his Norfolk 2: North-West and South volume in the Buildings of England series, revised and re-issued in 2002, terms Brown's almost complete reconstruction "pitiless". Little beyond a fragment of the chancel arch remains of the original building.

In 2023, having been declared redundant by the Church of England and attempts to identify alternative uses for the building having failed, St Andrew's was taken into the care of the Friends of Friendless Churches. As at 2025, the church remains closed while the FoFC undertakes a major restoration of the building, in consultation with Historic England. (Note: Preliminary investigations by the FoFC suggests that more of the original building may have been retained during John Brown's reconstruction that was initially thought.)

== Architecture and description ==
St Andrew's consists of a nave with porch, a chancel and a bellcote. The style is Romanesque Revival. The building material is brick, cased in cement render and with a slate roof. The interior is plain and whitewashed. The church is a Grade II* listed building.

== Gallery ==
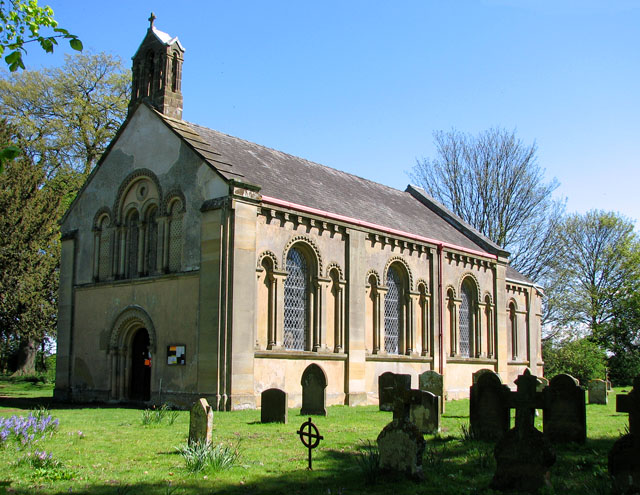
Another view

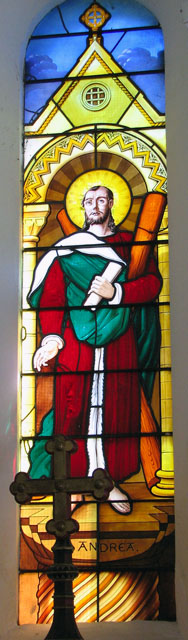
An example of the "very elementary" stained glass

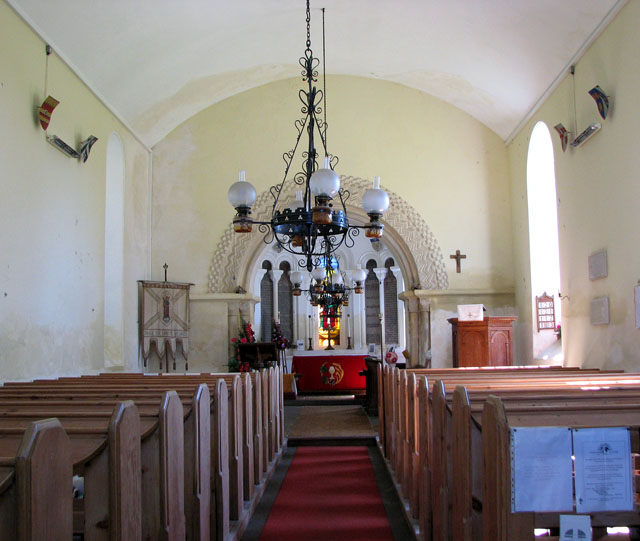
Interior

== Sources ==
- Pevsner, Nikolaus; Wilson, Bill (2002). Norfolk 2: North-West and South. The Buildings of England. Vol. 2. New Haven and London: Yale University Press.
