= Littleport railway station =

Railway station in Cambridgeshire, England

Coordinates: 52.462°N 0.317°E

Littleport
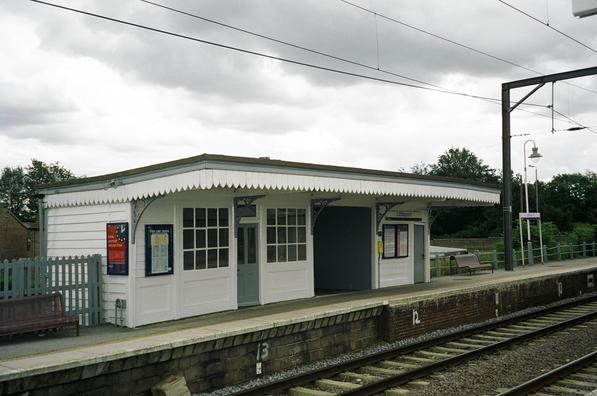
- The former shelter on the southbound platform at Littleport in August 2004

General information
- Location: Littleport, East Cambridgeshire; England
- Grid reference: TL574874
- Owner: Network Rail
- Manager: Great Northern
- Platforms: 2

Other information
- Station code: LTP
- Classification: DfT category F1

History
- Opened: 25 October 1847

Passengers
- 2020–21: ▼60,976
- 2021–22: ▲0.154 million
- 2022–23: ▲0.187 million
- 2023–24: ▲0.204 million
- 2024–25: ▲0.252 million
Location
Notes
- Passenger statistics from the Office of Rail and Road

Littleport railway station is on the Fen line in the east of England, serving the village of Littleport, Cambridgeshire. It is 76 miles (122 km) measured from London Liverpool Street and is situated between Ely and Downham Market stations. The station and all trains calling are operated by Great Northern.

== History ==
The station opened on 26 October 1847.

== Facilities ==
Littleport station is unstaffed and tickets must be purchased from the self-service ticket machine at the station which has seated areas and customer help points on both platforms. Step-free access is available to both the platforms at Littleport.

The station has a small cycle rack at the entrance as well as a small (free) car park which is operated by Saba Parking, delivered as part of a wider vision for Littleport by East Cambridgeshire District Council.

== Passenger volume ==
Passenger volume at Littleport
| | 2004–05 | 2005–06 | 2006–07 | 2007–08 | 2008–09 | 2009–10 | 2010–11 | 2011–12 | 2012–13 | 2013–14 | 2014–15 | 2015–16 | 2016–17 | 2017–18 | 2018–19 | 2019–20 | 2020–21 | 2021–22 | 2022–23 | 2023–24 | 2024–25 |
|---|---|---|---|---|---|---|---|---|---|---|---|---|---|---|---|---|---|---|---|---|---|
| Entries and exits | 119,198 | 122,655 | 146,218 | 148,836 | 156,124 | 149,428 | 178,254 | 199,804 | 206,596 | 225,024 | 238,062 | 229,628 | 242,814 | 245,786 | 248,808 | 238,488 | 60,976 | 153,660 | 186,752 | 204,358 | 251,780 |

The statistics cover twelve month periods that start in April.

== Services ==
The typical off-peak service in trains per hour is:

- 1 tph to London King's Cross
- 1 tph to King's Lynn

Additional services call at the station during the peak hours.

| Preceding station | National Rail | Following station |
|---|---|---|
| Ely | Great Northern Fen Line | Downham Market |
Historical railways
| Ely Line and station open | Great Eastern Railway Fen Line | Hilgay Line open, station closed |

== Bibliography ==
- Quick, Michael (2023). Railway Passenger Stations in Great Britain: A Chronology (PDF) (5th ed.). London: Railway and Canal Historical Society.
