= Hereward Line =

Railway line in Cambridgeshire, England

Hereward line
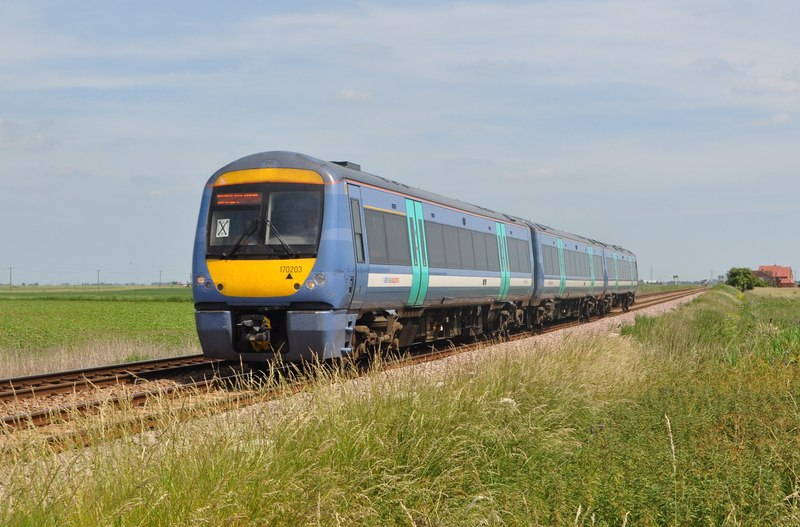
- National Express East Anglia Class 170 Turbostar near Turves in 2010

Overview
- Status: Operational
- Owner: Network Rail
- Locale: Cambridgeshire, England
- Termini: Ely 52.3910°N 0.2665°E; Peterborough 52.5746°N 0.2499°W
- Stations: 3 not counting Ely and Peterborough

Service
- Type: Heavy rail
- System: National Rail
- Operator(s): CrossCountry; East Midlands Railway; Abellio Greater Anglia
- Rolling stock: Class 755, Class 170, Class 15x, Class 66

Technical
- Number of tracks: Two
- Character: Secondary
- Track gauge: 4 ft 8 1/2 in (1,435 mm) standard gauge
- Operating speed: 75 mph maximum
Route map
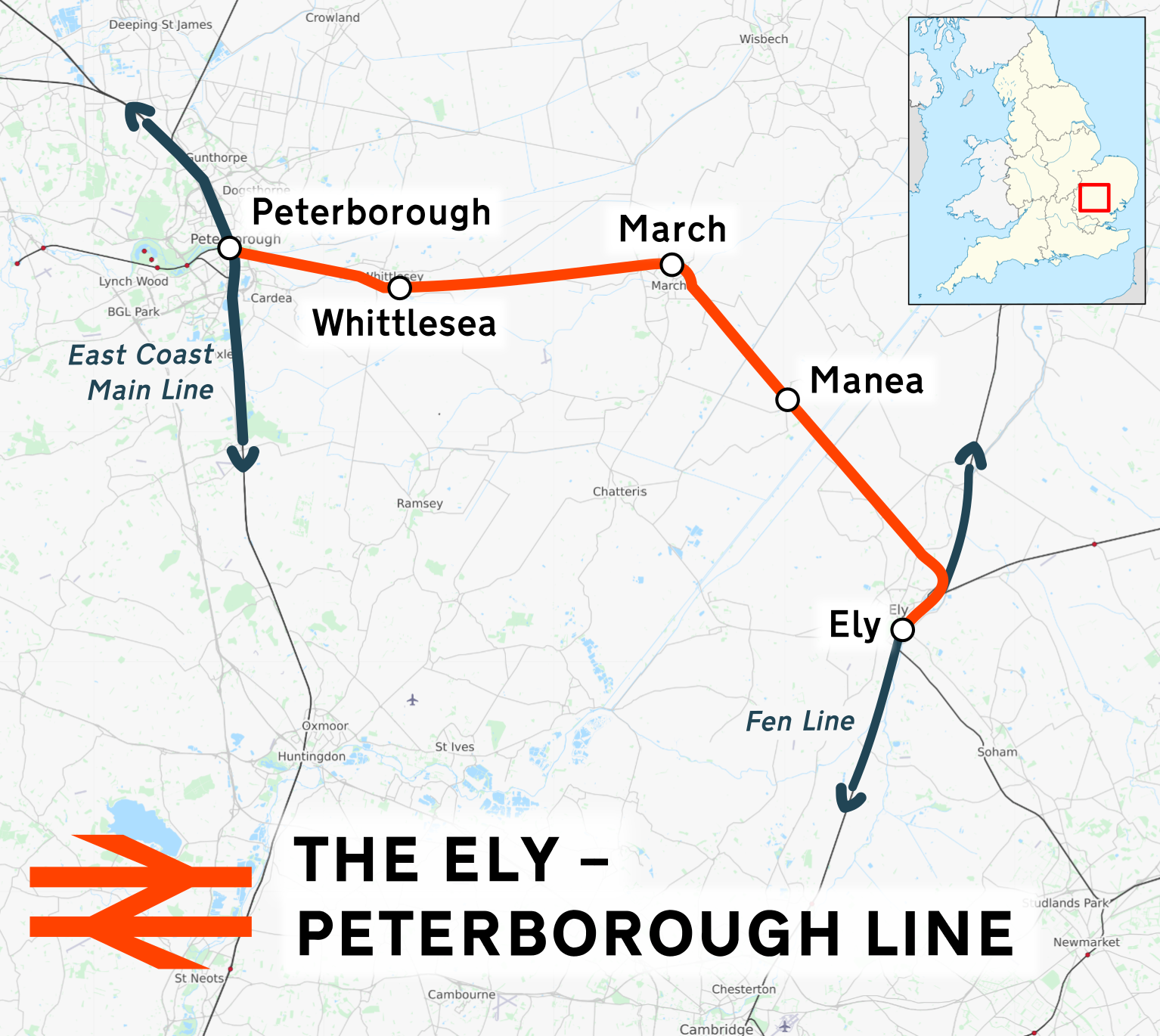
(Click to expand)

The Ely–Peterborough line, currently branded as the Hereward Line, is a railway line in England, linking East Anglia to the Midlands. It is a part of the Network Rail Strategic Route 5, SRS 05.07 and is classified as a secondary line. It is used by a variety of inter-regional and local passenger services from East Anglia to the West Midlands and North West, as well as freight and infrastructure traffic; it also links with the busy East Coast Main Line at its western end. Fenland District Council (the area's primary local authority) put forward their Rail Development Strategy for the route in 2012, which included infrastructure upgrades for the intermediate stations, improved frequencies for the services using it (e.g. doubling the Birmingham New Street to Stansted Airport service to half-hourly and the Ipswich to Peterborough service to hourly) and establishing a Community Rail Partnership for the line in 2013–14.

== History ==
The line was originally opened by the Eastern Counties Railway company in 1847, linking the ECR mainline from London via Cambridge and Ely to Brandon and Norwich with Peterborough. Trains initially terminated and started from Peterborough East, though a link to the Great Northern Railway's station was subsequently built to allow through running to the Midland Railway line to Leicester and the GNR main line to the north. Onward travel was also possible over two London and North Western Railway lines from Peterborough, to Rugby and Northampton whilst March would soon become a very busy junction with the opening of branches to King's Lynn via Wisbech and Cambridge via St Ives (both by the ECR) in 1847–48 and the GNR route to Spalding in 1867. The latter two were subsequently jointly vested in the GER and GNR in 1879.

Many of the branches fell victim to the Beeching Axe in the early to mid 1960s, as did Peterborough East and several of the intermediate stations. The March–Spalding line also closed in 1982 with the rundown of the marshalling yard at Whitemoor, leaving only the original main line in operation.

== Service ==
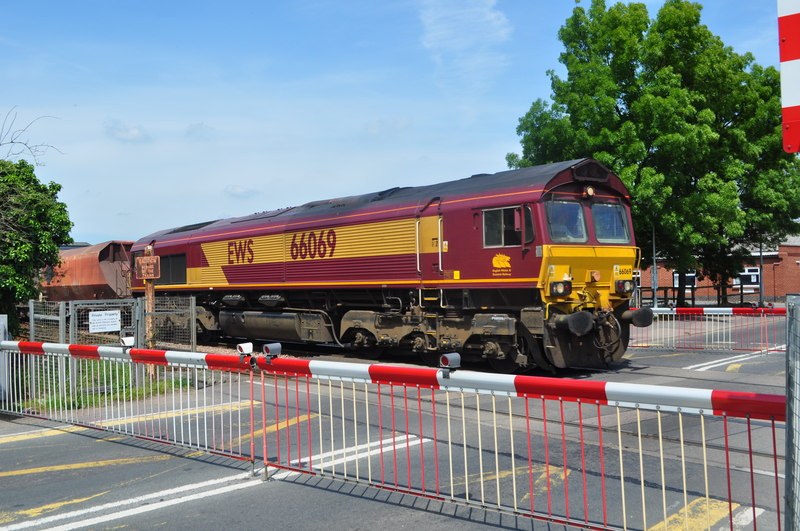
A freight train at March

Passenger services are provided by CrossCountry, East Midlands Railway and Greater Anglia. To the west most trains continue beyond Peterborough to either Leicester and Birmingham New Street (via the Birmingham–Peterborough line), or to Nottingham, Sheffield, Manchester Piccadilly and Liverpool Lime Street. To the east most trains continue beyond Ely to Norwich (via the Breckland Line), Ipswich (via the Ipswich–Ely line), or to Cambridge or Stansted Airport (via the Fen line). Connections are available for stations to King's Lynn at Ely. Services used to run between London and Peterborough until 2010.

The line is used extensively by freight trains from the Port of Felixstowe to the West Midlands, North West and Scotland, as it forms part of the Felixstowe to Nuneaton rail freight corridor that is being upgraded by Network Rail to allow more railborne freight from the port to be diverted away from London.

== Infrastructure ==
The line is double track throughout, has a loading gauge of W10 and a line speed of 40–75 mph (64–121 km/h). Apart from short stretches at each end, the line is not electrified.

== See also ==
- Railways in Ely
