= Brandon railway station =

Railway station in Norfolk, England

Brandon
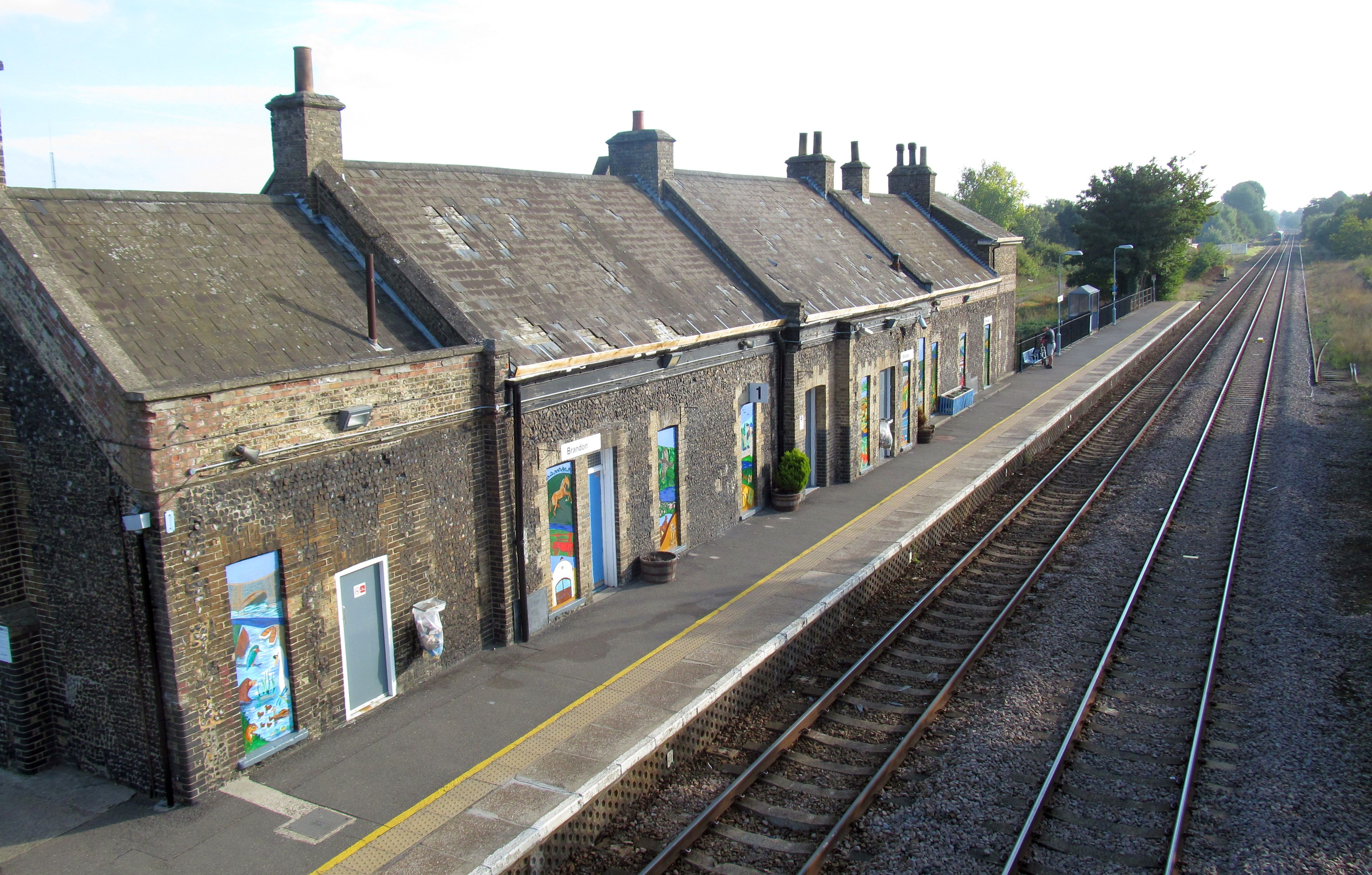

General information
- Location: Weeting-with-Broomhill, Breckland; England
- Coordinates: 52.4539°N 0.6243°E
- Grid reference: TL784872
- Manager: Greater Anglia
- Platforms: 2

Other information
- Station code: BND
- Classification: DfT category F2

History
- Original company: Norfolk Railway
- Pre-grouping: Eastern Counties Railway, Great Eastern Railway
- Post-grouping: London and North Eastern Railway

Key dates
- 30 July 1845: Opened as Brandon
- 1 July 1923: Renamed Brandon (Norfolk)
- 1 March 1925: Renamed Brandon

Passengers
- 2020/21: ▼26,804
- 2021/22: ▲93,682
- 2022/23: ▲0.115 million
- 2023/24: ▲0.119 million
- 2024/25: ▲0.129 million

Listed Building – Grade II
- Official name: Brandon Railway Station
- Designated: 28 August 2020
- Reference no.: 1471392
Location
Notes
- Passenger statistics from the Office of Rail and Road

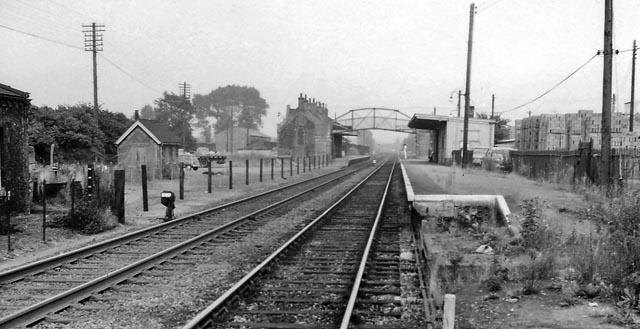
View eastward, towards Norwich, in August 1969

Brandon railway station is on the Breckland Line in the East of England, serving the town of Brandon, Suffolk, although the station is actually situated across the county boundary in Norfolk. The line runs between Cambridge in the west and Norwich in the east.

Brandon is 86 miles 32 chains (139 km) from London Liverpool Street via Ely. It is managed by Greater Anglia, which operates most of the services. The station building was designed by the sculptor John Thomas and completed in 1845. The station is Grade II listed.

== History ==
=== Early years (1844–1862) ===
The Norwich and Brandon Railway Act 1844 (7 & 8 Vict. c. xv) for the Norwich and Brandon Railway (N&BR) received royal assent on 10 May 1844. The line was to link with an Eastern Counties Railway (ECR) project of a line from Newport in Essex to Brandon in Norfolk. Once complete the line would enable trains to travel from Norwich to London. Work started on the line in 1844.

One month before the N&BR opened the Norfolk Railway Act 1845 (8 & 9 Vict. c. xli) authorising the amalgamation of the Yarmouth and Norwich Railway with the N&BR came into effect and so, the soon to open, Brandon station became a Norfolk Railway asset. The station building was designed by the sculptor John Thomas, some of whose other rail stations are Grade II listed. To blend it with the local vernacular, Thomas designed it to be built with Brandon flint.

The line opened on 30 July 1845 at the same time as the ECR's Brandon to Newport (Essex) line which served Cambridge and Ely. However, the line only got to Trowse, in the suburbs of Norwich, as the contractors were having to build a swing bridge to cross the navigable River Wensum. This was finished in December and on 15 December services started running through to Norwich.

Generous provision was made for the maintenance of locomotives at Brandon with a six-road engine house being provided, although once the ECR took over the NR in 1848, the shed's role was diminished. Although it was reported in the Locomotive Magazine during 1901 that stabling was being undertaken there. A picture of 1911 shows goods stock stabled outside the shed buildings.

The ECR and its rival the Eastern Union Railway (EUR) were both sizing up the NR to acquire and expand their railway empire. The ECR trumped the EUR by taking over the NR, including Brandon station, on 8 May 1848.

In September 1853, a freight train came to a halt near Brandon, due to a defect on the locomotive. The driver of a second freight train ignored a red signal and consequently his train was in a rear-end collision with the first. Time interval working was in force at the time.

=== Great Eastern Railway (1862–1922) ===
By the 1860s the railways in East Anglia were in financial trouble, and most were leased to the Eastern Counties Railway, which wished to amalgamate formally but could not obtain government agreement for this until the Great Eastern Railway Act 1862 (25 & 26 Vict. c. ccxxiii) was passes on 7 August 1862, when the Great Eastern Railway (GER) was formed by the amalgamation. Actually, Brandon became a GER station on 1 July 1862 when the GER took over the ECR and the EUR before the bill received royal assent.

The system settled down for the next six decades, apart from the disruption of World War I. The difficult economic circumstances after the war led the government to pass the Railways Act 1921 which led to the creation of the Big Four. The GER amalgamated with several other companies to create the London and North Eastern Railway (LNER). Brandon became an LNER station on 1 January 1923.

=== London and North Eastern Railway (1923–1947) ===
Six months into LNER ownership it was decided to rename the station as Brandon (Norfolk) (1 July 1923). It is uncertain as to why as, according to Butt, there were other stations called Brandon, but none had the suffix-less title Brandon. The renaming was seen as unnecessary and on 1 March 1925 the station reverted to its original name.

=== British Railways (1948–1994) ===
On nationalisation in 1948 the station and its services came under the auspices of the Eastern Region of British Railways.

In 1978 Brandon became an unstaffed station.

=== Privatisation era (1994–present day) ===
On privatisation, Central Trains took over the management of the station and all of its services on 5 January 1997.

On 1 April 2004 management of the station and the bulk of its services came under National Express East Anglia, then known as one.

On 11 November 2007 services between Liverpool and Norwich were transferred to East Midlands Trains upon the breakup of the Central Trains franchise.

The station and most of its services were transferred to Abellio Greater Anglia on 5 February 2012.

On 18 August 2019, all services operated by East Midlands Trains transferred to East Midlands Railway upon the expiry of the former's franchise.

=== Proposed demolition ===
In 2020, Greater Anglia planned to demolish the historic 1840s station building to enlarge the car park. On 6 May 2020 Greater Anglia confirmed that it had been granted permission to carry out the work. The project was expected to begin by the end of 2020.

Greater Anglia's plan was to replace it with a car park and "anti-vandal waiting shelters". In spite of objections by the local parish council and others, Breckland District Council said, "The only issues of consideration ... are the method of demolition and site restoration. The purpose of this application is not to assess the historical merit of the building and potential restoration of the building."

However, according to Historic England, railway stations of such an early date are considered to be "of international significance as being among the earliest railway structures in the world, and even partial survivals need to be assessed carefully". Nevertheless, the Railway Heritage Trust (sponsored by Network Rail and Highways England) did not support the objectors' cause. However SAVE arranged for plans to be drawn up for an office conversion, in another attempt to preserve the building.

In August 2020 the planned demolition was put on hold following campaign group SAVE Britain’s Heritage launching judicial proceedings. On 28 August 2020, the station was granted Grade II listed status.

== Services ==
A regular hourly service calling at Brandon was introduced in 2007. This resulted in a significant increase in the number of passengers using the station.

As of February 2023 there is typically one train per hour to Norwich and one to Stansted Airport via Cambridge, operated by Greater Anglia.

East Midlands Railway operates a single morning service to Norwich from Monday to Saturday, on its route from Nottingham, typically departing at 07:20 on weekdays and 07:23 on Saturdays. Two East Midlands Railway services serve the station on Sundays, departing at 11:13 and 14:38 respectively towards Norwich.

Services towards Norwich were suspended between March and April 2023 due to structural damage to the station building.

Preceding station	National Rail	Following station
Lakenheath	Greater Anglia Breckland Line	Thetford
Ely	East Midlands Railway Liverpool–Norwich Limited services	Thetford
