= Downham Market railway station =

Railway station in Norfolk, England

Coordinates: 52.60560°N 0.36724°E

Downham Market
- The station building in 2014

General information
- Location: Downham Market, King's Lynn and West Norfolk; England
- Grid reference: TF602033
- Owner: Network Rail
- Manager: Great Northern
- Platforms: 2

Other information
- Station code: DOW
- Classification: DfT category E

History
- Opened: 27 October 1846
- Original company: Lynn and Ely Railway
- Pre-grouping: Great Eastern Railway
- Post-grouping: London and North Eastern Railway

Key dates
- 27 October 1846: Opened as Downham
- 12 May 1981: Renamed Downham Market

Passengers
- 2020–21: ▼0.129 million
- 2021–22: ▲0.342 million
- 2022–23: ▲0.386 million
- 2023–24: ▲0.400 million
- 2024–25: ▲0.441 million

Listed Building – Grade II
- Feature: Downham Market Railway Station
- Designated: 16 November 1972
- Reference no.: 1171244
Location
Notes
- Passenger statistics from the Office of Rail and Road

Downham Market railway station (formerly Downham) is on the Fen line in the east of England, serving the town of Downham Market, Norfolk. It is 86 miles 8 chains (138.6 km) measured from London Liverpool Street and is situated between Littleport and Watlington stations. The station and all trains calling are operated by Great Northern. The station building of 1846, built of carrstone with pale brick dressings, is a Grade II listed building.

== History ==
The station, as seen from the level crossing to the south

Downham Market signal box in 2026

The Lynn and Ely Railway Act 1845 (8 & 9 Vict. c. lv) received royal assent on 30 June 1845. Work started on the line in 1846 and the line and its stations were opened on 27 October 1846. Downham station, as it was known at the time, was situated south of Stow Bardolph and was the temporary terminus of the line. The line to Ely was completed and opened on 25 October 1847. Downham station ceased to be a temporary terminus when the line was opened through to Denver Road Gate. The name was changed to Downham Market from 12 May 1981.

The wooden signal box, built for the Great Eastern Railway in 1881, was listed Grade II in 2013. It is still in use today and is lever-operated.

In early 2017, the station was redecorated to commemorate Network SouthEast, the British Rail division that operated services across England's south east 30 years previously. With assistance from the Railway Heritage Trust, paintwork and signage has been returned to a style that mimics that of the late 1980s.

On 10 August 2009 Network Rail submitted a planning application for a new £1.5 million footbridge, describing the current foot crossing as "one of the most dangerous in the country". The plan was supported by then-station operator First Capital Connect, with an intended completion date of summer 2011. The initial application was withdrawn following consultation with local councils, English Heritage and the Railway Heritage Trust and a revised plan submitted in December 2009 following changes to improve the appearance of the bridge. However, this proposal was rejected by King's Lynn and West Norfolk Council in April 2010, citing the lack of accessibility for disabled passengers and the effect of the bridge on the Grade II listed station building. The foot crossing has since been closed and passengers must now use the nearby road level crossing to switch between platforms.

== Facilities ==
The station is well equipped with a ticket office and ticket machine, a car park and cycle storage, a taxi rank, accessible toilets, a refreshment kiosk and help points. There is one waiting room and one waiting shelter.

== Passenger volume ==
Passenger volume at Downham Market
	2004–05	2005–06	2006–07	2007–08	2008–09	2009–10	2010–11	2011–12	2012–13	2013–14	2014–15	2015–16	2016–17	2017–18	2018–19	2019–20	2020–21	2021–22	2022–23	2023–24	2024–25
Entries and exits	277,744	276,900	307,013	361,433	365,612	360,032	406,690	432,014	452,674	460,056	491,744	500,442	523,846	533,410	549,562	512,772	129,058	341,550	386,270	399,600	440,550

The statistics cover twelve month periods that start in April.

== Services ==
The typical off-peak service in trains per hour is:

- 1 tph to London King's Cross
- 1 tph to King's Lynn

Additional services call at the station during the peak hours.

Preceding station	National Rail	Following station
Littleport	Great Northern Fen Line	Watlington
Historical railways
Denver Line open, station closed	Great Eastern Railway Fen Line	Stow Bardolph Line open, station closed

== Bibliography ==
- Quick, Michael (2023). Railway Passenger Stations in Great Britain: A Chronology (PDF) (5th ed.). London: Railway and Canal Historical Society.
