= Runcton Holme =

Village in Norfolk, England

Coordinates: 52.65452°N 0.392075°E

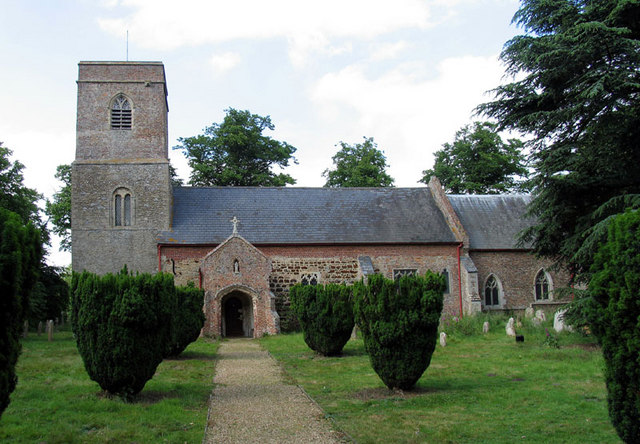
- St James, Runcton Holme

- Location within Norfolk
- Area: 13.89 km^{2} (5.36 sq mi)
- Population: 657 (2011)
  - Density: 47/km^{2} (120/sq mi)
- OS grid reference: TF618089
- Civil parish: Runcton Holme
- District: King's Lynn and West Norfolk
- Shire county: Norfolk
- Region: East
- Country: England
- Sovereign state: United Kingdom
- Post town: KING'S LYNN
- Postcode district: PE33
- Police: Norfolk
- Fire: Norfolk
- Ambulance: East of England

Runcton Holme is a village and civil parish in the English county of Norfolk. It covers an area of 13.89 km^{2} (5.36 sq mi) and had a population of 676 in 288 households at the 2001 census, the population reducing to 657 at the 2011 census. For the purposes of local government, it falls within the district of King's Lynn and West Norfolk. The civil parish includes South Runcton.

The villages name means 'Pole farm/settlement on an island', perhaps denoting a trackway or an enclosed settlement.

The parish church of St James, Runcton Holme, is a Grade I listed building. St Andrew's in South Runcton is Grade II*; completely rebuilt in 1838–9, it is now in the care of the Friends of Friendless Churches.

== See also ==
- North Runcton
