= Fen Line =

Railway line in East Anglia, UK

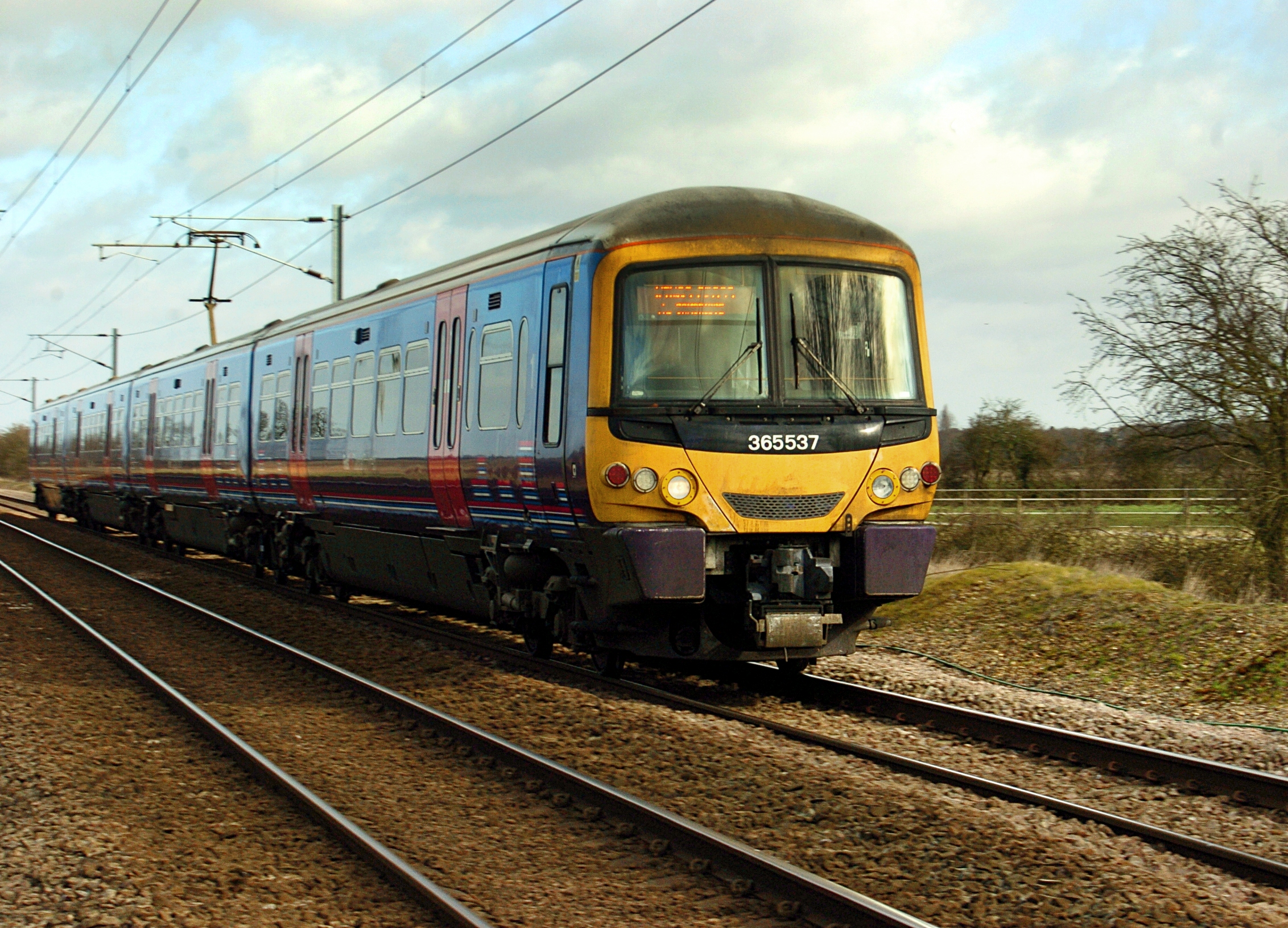
- First Capital Connect Class 365 Networker Express passing through Runcton Holme in 2012

Overview
- Status: Operational
- Owner: Network Rail
- Locale: East of England
- Termini: Cambridge; King's Lynn
- Stations: 8

Service
- Type: Heavy rail
- System: National Rail
- Operators: Great Northern; Greater Anglia; CrossCountry
- Rolling stock: Class 170 "Turbostar"; Class 379 "Electrostar"; Class 387 "Electrostar"; Class 720 "Aventra"; Class 755 "FLIRT"

Technical
- Line length: 41 miles 47 chains (66.9 km)
- Number of tracks: 1-2
- Character: Secondary\London & South-East
- Track gauge: 4 ft 8 1/2 in (1,435 mm) standard gauge
- Electrification: 25 kV AC OHLE
- Operating speed: 90 mph (145 km/h) maximum
Route map
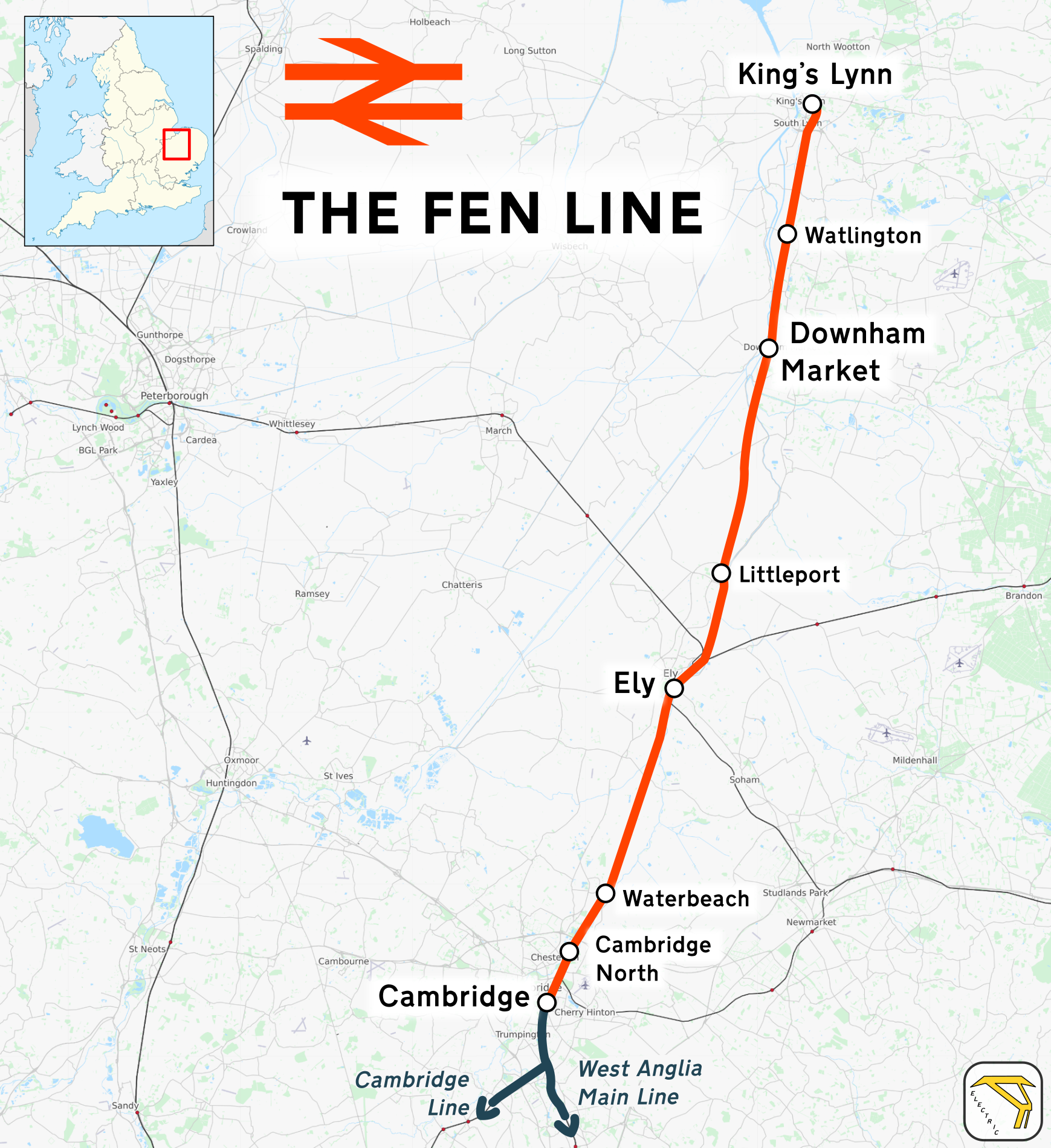
(Click to expand)

The Fen Line is a railway line in the east of England that links Cambridge in the south to King's Lynn in the north. The line runs through Cambridgeshire and Norfolk and the name of the line refers to the Fens which cover parts of Cambridgeshire, Norfolk and Lincolnshire. It is 41 miles 47 chains (66.9 km) in length and has eight stations.

The line is part of the Network Rail Strategic Route 5 and comprises SRS 05.06 and part of 05.05. It is classified as a secondary line except between Cambridge and Ely where it is classified as a London and South East commuter line.

== History ==
The line was completed in sections in the 1840s, and previously extended north to the seaside town of Hunstanton.

== Services ==
=== Great Northern ===
Great Northern operates through services to London King's Cross (via the Cambridge line). These services run non-stop between London and Cambridge South for most of the day, as part of the half-hourly "Cambridge Express" service. One train per hour is extended beyond Cambridge to serve all stations to King's Lynn, whilst the alternate services only continue as far as Ely.

These services are mostly operated by Class 387 and Class 700 electric multiple units. Before May 2017, Class 365s were the principal units.

=== Greater Anglia ===
Greater Anglia regularly runs services between Stansted Airport and Norwich on an hourly basis via the Breckland line, running non-stop between Ely and Cambridge North. Class 755 units are used for this service.

Until the timetable change in May 2023, Greater Anglia ran a few direct services between London Liverpool Street and King's Lynn or Ely (via the West Anglia Main Line). These services operated only during the morning and evening peaks. After the alterations, these services only run to and from Ely, and King's Lynn no longer has any direct services to London Liverpool Street.

=== CrossCountry ===
The section between Cambridge and Ely is also used non-stop by CrossCountry services from Stansted Airport (and onward to Birmingham New Street via Peterborough and Leicester). Class 170 units are used for this service.

== Signalling ==
The line is double tracked except between Littleport and Downham Market and between Watlington and King's Lynn where it is bi-directionally signalled single track. In the Down direction, the entrance to the single line sections is protected additionally by SPAD indicators.

Signal boxes controlling the line are;

- Cambridge power box
- Littleport
- Downham Market
- Magdalen Road (Watlington)
- King's Lynn

The signalling system is Track circuit block with multiple aspect colour light signals- with the exception of:

- one semaphore signal at King's Lynn which controls entry to the One Train In Section freight-only line from King's Lynn to Middleton Towers
- two semaphore shunt signals at Downham Market station

In 2020, the Department of Transport announced funding to renew the signalling on the Fen Line to ETCS cab signalling.

== Infrastructure ==
Traction current for electric trains is provided by 25 kV AC OHLE controlled by Romford Electrical Control Room. There are Neutral Sections at Shepreth Branch junction, Milton Fen and just north of Littleport bypass. The line has a loading gauge of W8 except for the section connecting the Ipswich–Ely line to the Ely–Peterborough line, which is W10.

== Passenger volume ==
These are the statistics of the numbers of passengers on the line from the year beginning April 2002 to the year beginning April 2017. Comparing each station between the first and last years (14 years total), King's Lynn has increased by 68%, Watlington by 133%, Downham Market by 111%, Littleport by 157%, Ely by 113%, Waterbeach by 149% and Cambridge by 109%. Cambridge North was not open at the time of the publication of these figures.

Station usage
Station name	2002–03	2004–05	2005–06	2006–07	2007–08	2008–09	2009–10	2010–11	2011–12	2012–13	2013–14	2014–15	2015–16	2016–17	2017–18	2018–19	2019–20	2020–21	2021–22	2022–23	2023–24	2024–25
King's Lynn	593,675	641,668	622,034	656,624	680,230	739,282	750,738	821,772	869,006	879,836	913,460	970,890	973,660	998,316	998,498	991,252	931,394	240,162	683,706	757,034		
Watlington	64,091	85,231	85,423	91,250	100,665	111,612	107,956	113,898	129,146	137,874	131,742	143,904	148,928	144,114	146,014	153,782	138,366	39,078	105,886	107,724		
Downham Market	248,368	277,744	276,900	307,013	361,433	365,612	360,032	406,690	432,014	452,674	460,060	491,744	500,442	523,846	533,426	549,562	512,772	129,058	341,550	386,270		
Littleport	94,363	119,198	122,655	146,218	148,836	156,124	149,428	178,254	199,804	206,596	225,024	238,062	229,628	242,814	248,786	248,808	238,488	60,976	153,660	186,752		
Ely	1,038,708	1,255,362	1,278,724	1,420,734	1,505,730	1,583,246	1,579,948	1,731,956	1,824,036	1,878,426	1,976,150	2,068,240	2,131,818	2,209,350	2,281,710	2,386,744	2,363,818	577,460	1,634,548	1,894,014		
Waterbeach	176,639	197,594	213,500	227,281	250,039	277,470	266,020	301,376	312,216	335,660	344,726	381,202	420,730	440,142	430,050	407,650	377,660	100,176	265,180	309,130		
Cambridge North	—N/a	—N/a	—N/a	—N/a	—N/a	—N/a	—N/a	—N/a	—N/a	—N/a	—N/a	—N/a	—N/a	—N/a	488,878	812,972	949,550	220,958	733,612	1,074,602		
Cambridge	5,478,112	6,060,475	6,137,423	6,522,309	6,997,887	7,571,838	7,661,146	8,245,416	8,823,236	9,168,938	9,824,910	10,420,178	10,954,212	11,424,902	11,530,238	11,983,320	11,599,814	2,300,528	6,952,780	9,341,600		
The annual passenger usage is based on sales of tickets in stated financial years from Office of Rail and Road estimates of station usage. The statistics are for passengers arriving and departing from each station and cover twelve-month periods that start in April. Methodology may vary year on year. Usage since the period 2019–20 have been affected by the COVID-19 pandemic, especially the period 2020–23.
