= Cambridge City Council elections =

Local government elections in Cambridgeshire, England

One third of Cambridge City Council is elected each year, followed by one year without election.

== Council composition ==
Year	Labour	Liberal Democrats (Note: Includes totals for the predecessors of the Liberal Democrats, the Liberal Party and SDP (both of which participated in the Alliance).)	Conservative	Green	Independents & Others	Council control after election
Local government reorganisation; council established (42 seats)
1973	26	5	11	–	0	Labour
New ward boundaries (42 seats)
1976	16	2	24	0	0	Conservative
1978	17	2	22	0	1	Conservative
1979	18	3	20	0	1	No overall control
1980	21	4	16	0	1	No overall control
1982	20	9	13	0	0	No overall control
1983	21	9	12	0	0	No overall control
1984	21	10	11	0	0	No overall control
1986	22	10	10	0	0	Labour
1987	20	11	11	0	0	No overall control
1988	22	7	13	0	0	Labour
1990	24	7	11	0	0	Labour
1991	25	7	10	0	0	Labour
1992	21	12	9	0	0	No overall control
1994	19	16	7	0	0	No overall control
1995	20	18	4	0	0	No overall control
1996	23	18	1	0	0	Labour
1998	21	18	3	0	0	No overall control
1999	21	18	3	0	0	No overall control
2000	16	23	3	0	0	Liberal Democrats
2002	16	24	2	0	0	Liberal Democrats
2003	14	26	2	0	0	Liberal Democrats
New ward boundaries (42 seats)
2004	13	28	1	0	0	Liberal Democrats
2006	13	29	0	0	0	Liberal Democrats
2007	13	29	0	0	0	Liberal Democrats
2008	11	28	1	1	1	Liberal Democrats
2010	9	29	1	2	1	Liberal Democrats
2011	13	26	0	2	1	Liberal Democrats
2012	18	21	1	1	1	No overall control
2014	24	15	1	0	2	Labour
2015	24	14	1	1	2	Labour
2016	26	13	0	1	2	Labour
2018	26	15	0	1	1	Labour
2019	26	15	0	0	1	Labour
New ward boundaries (42 seats)
2021	27	12	0	2	1	Labour
2022	29	9	0	3	1	Labour
2023	27	10	0	4	1	Labour
2024	25	10	1	5	1	Labour
2026	17	11	1	12	1	No overall control

== Results maps ==
1978 results map

1979 results map

1980 results map

1982 results map

1983 results map

1984 results map

1986 results map

1987 results map

1988 results map

1990 results map

1991 results map

1992 results map

1994 results map

1995 results map

1996 results map

1998 results map

1999 results map

2000 results map

2002 results map

2003 results map

2004 results map

2006 results map

2007 results map

2008 results map

2010 results map

2011 results map

2012 results map

2014 results map

2015 results map

2016 results map

2018 results map

2019 results map

2021 results map

2022 results map

2023 results map

2024 results map

2026 results map

== By-election results ==
=== 1994-1998 ===
Arbury By-Election 1 May 1997
Party	Candidate	Votes	%	±%
Labour	Anthony Schofield	1,769	51.3	−3.6
Conservative	Mark Taylor	1,106	32.1	−2.5
Liberal Democrats	Tim Wesson	571	16.6	+6.0
Majority		663	19.2	
Turnout		3,446		
Labour hold		Swing		

Petersfield By-Election 4 December 1997
Party	Candidate	Votes	%	±%
Labour	Hannah Reed	664	58.5	−3.9
Liberal Democrats	Michael Dixon	186	16.4	−8.7
Conservative	Peter Welton	121	10.7	−1.9
Green	Margaret Wright	117	10.3	+10.3
Independent	Laurence Jones	48	4.2	+4.2
Majority		478	42.1	
Turnout		1,136	15.8	
Labour hold		Swing		

=== 1998-2002 ===
Arbury By-Election 10 February 2000
Party	Candidate	Votes	%	±%
Liberal Democrats	Rhodri James	723	44.5	+29.8
Labour	Stuart Newbold	540	33.2	−24.0
Conservative	Mark Taylor	312	19.2	−8.9
Green	Stephen Lawrence	51	3.1	+3.1
Majority		183	11.3	
Turnout		1,626	31.7	
Liberal Democrats gain from Labour		Swing		

=== 2002-2006 ===
Coleridge By-Election 21 July 2005
Party	Candidate	Votes	%	±%
Labour	Benjamin Stafford	829	46.8	+13.0
Liberal Democrats	Andrew Blackhurst	638	36.0	+14.8
Conservative	Steven Mastin	263	14.8	−7.4
UKIP	Albert Watts	42	2.4	−5.7
Majority		191	10.8	
Turnout		1,772	30.2	
Labour hold		Swing		

=== 2006-2010 ===
Trumpington By-Election 16 November 2006
Party	Candidate	Votes	%	±%
Liberal Democrats	Andrew Blackhurst	858	51.4	+5.9
Conservative	John Ionides	618	37.0	+1.3
Labour	Pamela Stacey	109	6.5	−2.6
Green	Ceri Galloway	85	5.1	−4.6
Majority		240	14.4	
Turnout		1,675	30.9	
Liberal Democrats hold		Swing		

East Chesterton By-Election 4 June 2009
Party	Candidate	Votes	%	±%
Liberal Democrats		836	37.6	−0.8
Conservative		552	24.9	−3.6
Labour		319	14.4	−3.8
Green		313	14.1	+4.1
UKIP		201	9.0	+9.0
Majority		284	12.8	
Turnout		2,221		
Liberal Democrats hold		Swing		

=== 2010-2014 ===
Coleridge By-Election 4 November 2010
Party	Candidate	Votes	%	±%
Labour	George Owers	900	44.0	+11.7
Conservative	Andrew Bower	734	35.9	+7.5
Liberal Democrats	Sarah Barnes	223	10.9	−14.6
Green	Valerie Hopkins	137	6.7	−4.2
UKIP	Albert Watts	53	2.6	−0.3
Majority		166	8.1	
Turnout		2,047		
Labour gain from Conservative		Swing		

Abbey By-Election 2 May 2013
Party	Candidate	Votes	%	±%
Labour	Peter Roberts	878	51.4	−3.0
Green	Oliver Perkins	336	19.7	−4.2
Conservative	Eric Barrett-Payton	284	16.6	+4.2
Liberal Democrats	Marcus Streets	209	12.2	+2.9
Majority		542	31.8	
Turnout		1,707		
Labour gain from Green		Swing		

=== 2014-2018 ===
Queen Edith's By-Election 13 November 2014
Party	Candidate	Votes	%	±%
Liberal Democrats	Viki Sanders	933	36.5	−6.1
Labour	Rahima Ahammed	790	30.9	+1.2
Conservative	Andrew Bower	614	24.0	+7.7
Green	Joel Chalfen	222	8.7	−2.7
Majority		143	5.6	
Turnout		2,559		
Liberal Democrats gain from Labour		Swing		

Arbury By-Election 4 May 2017
Party	Candidate	Votes	%	±%
Labour	Patrick Sheil	1,267	46.8	−14.7
Liberal Democrats	Tim Ward	992	36.5	+20.8
Conservative	Henry Collins	450	16.6	+4.5
Majority		275	10.2	
Turnout		2,709		
Labour hold		Swing		

=== 2018-2022 ===
Petersfield By-Election 13 September 2018
Party	Candidate	Votes	%	±%
Labour	Kelley Green	873	47.9	−10.4
Liberal Democrats	Sarah Brown	663	36.4	+16.4
Green	Virgin Ierubino	171	9.4	−3.5
Conservative	Othman Cole	115	6.3	−2.5
Majority		210	11.5	
Turnout		1,822		
Labour hold		Swing		

Newnham By-Election 8 August 2019
Party	Candidate	Votes	%	±%
Liberal Democrats	Josh Matthews	774	59.5	+16.3
Labour	Niamh Marian Sweeney	235	18.1	−18.1
Green	Mark Slade	149	11.5	+1.5
Conservative	Michael David Spencer	143	11.0	+0.2
Majority		539	41.4	
Turnout		1,301		
Liberal Democrats hold		Swing		

=== 2022-2026 ===
Trumpington By-Election 18 August 2022
Party	Candidate	Votes	%	±%
Liberal Democrats	David Levien	1,017	49.8	
Labour	Rahima Ahammed	472	23.1	
Green	Ceri Galloway	298	14.6	
Conservative	Shapour Meftah	256	12.5	
Majority		545	26.7	
Turnout		2,043		
Liberal Democrats hold		Swing		

King's Hedges By-Election 4 July 2023
Party	Candidate	Votes	%	±%
Conservative	Mohamed Delowar Hossain	622	34.9	+3.0
Labour	Zarina Anwar	598	33.6	−5.6
Liberal Democrats	Jamie Leon Dalzell	418	23.5	+8.5
Green	Elizabeth Alice May	142	8.0	–6.0
Majority		24	1.3	
Turnout		1,780	26.7	
Conservative gain from Labour		Swing	▲4.3	

Queen Edith's By-Election 23 November 2023
Party	Candidate	Votes	%	±%
Liberal Democrats	Immy Blackburn-Horgan	745	35.0	−2.9
Labour	Thomas Ron	678	31.8	+8.1
Conservative	David Carmona	454	21.3	+1.9
Green	Oliver Fisher	252	11.8	+1.6
Majority		67	3.1	
Turnout		2,129		
Liberal Democrats gain from Independent		Swing		

Romsey By-Election 12 September 2024
Party	Candidate	Votes	%	±%
Labour	Beth Gardiner-Smith	596	42.8	−9.4
Green	Zak Karimjee	409	29.4	+10.3
Liberal Democrats	John Walmsley	249	17.9	+6.7
Conservative	Rob Nelson	138	9.9	+2.3
Majority		187	13.4	
Turnout		1,392		
Labour hold		Swing		

East Chesterton By-Election 1 May 2025
Party	Candidate	Votes	%	±%
Liberal Democrats	Bob Illingworth	871	33.1	+1.1
Labour	Sarah Haithcock	756	28.7	−13.4
Green	Sarah Nicmanis	478	18.2	+2.8
Reform	Mike Nicolson	301	11.4	+11.4
Conservative	Steven George	224	8.5	−2.0
Majority		115	4.4	
Turnout		2,630		
Liberal Democrats gain from Labour		Swing		

West Chesterton By-Election 1 May 2025
Party	Candidate	Votes	%	±%
Liberal Democrats	Jamie Dalzell	1,204	38.5	+2.5
Labour	Rosy Greenlees	1,030	33.0	−9.9
Green	Hannah Copley	533	17.1	+3.9
Reform	Tommy Brace	197	6.3	+6.3
Conservative	Michael Harford	160	5.1	−2.8
Majority		174	4.4	
Turnout		3,124		
Liberal Democrats gain from Labour		Swing		
