= 2012 Cambridge City Council election =

2012 UK local government election

← 2011	3 May 2012	2014 →

16: one-third of 42 22 seats needed for a majority

	First party	Second party
Party	Labour	Liberal Democrats
Seat change	▲	▼
Swing	▲	▲
	Third party	Fourth party
Party	Independent	Green
Seat change	Steady	▼
Swing	▲	▼
- Winner of each seat at the 2012 Cambridge City Council election

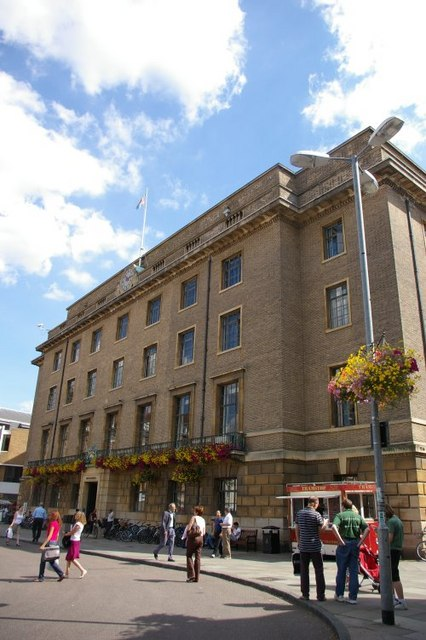
The Guildhall, Cambridge, where City Councillors meet.

Elections for Cambridge City Council (in Cambridge, England) were held on Thursday 3 May 2012. One third of the council was up for election and the Liberal Democrats lost overall control of the council, to No Overall Control.

== Election result ==
2012 Cambridge City Council election
Party	This election			Full council			This election		
Party	Seats	Net	Seats %	Other	Total	Total %	Votes	Votes %	+/−
Liberal Democrats	4	▼4	28.6	17	21	50.0	7,560	26.1	+0.7
Labour	8	▲4	57.1	10	18	42.9	12,353	42.7	+7.2
Conservative	1	▲1	7.1	0	1	2.4	4,464	15.4	-6.1
Green	0	▼1	0.0	1	1	2.4	2,925	10.1	-5.5
Independent	1	Steady	7.1	0	1	2.4	925	3.2	+2.8
Cambridge Socialists	0	Steady	0.0	0	0	0.0	457	1.6	N/A
UKIP	0	Steady	0.0	0	0	0.0	129	0.4	-0.1
United People's Party	0	Steady	0.0	0	0	0.0	105	0.4	N/A

The Liberal Democrats retained control of the council, with the casting vote of the Mayor, though they lost a majority. The overall turnout was 32.2%,

== Ward results ==
Note: in results where, in previous elections, two seats were up for election the party share of the vote is based on an average for those candidates who stood for that particular party in the election.

Unless stated otherwise, changes in party vote is in comparison with the 2011 Cambridge City Council election results.

=== Abbey ward ===
Councillor Margaret Wright retired her Abbey seat. William Birkin was aiming to retain the vacated seat for the Greens.

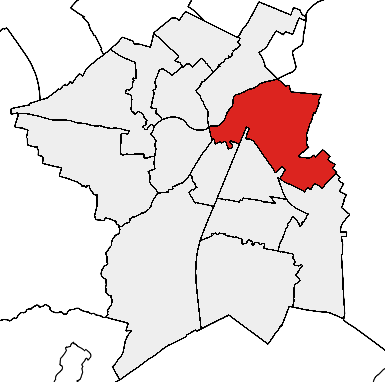
Abbey ward

Cambridge City Council Elections 2012: Abbey ward
Party	Candidate	Votes	%	±%
Labour	Richard Johnson	963	54.4	+12.6
Green	William Birkin	423	23.9	−7.6
Conservative	Timothy Haire	219	12.4	−4.0
Liberal Democrats	Christopher Brown	165	9.3	−1.0
Majority		540	30.5	+20.2
Rejected ballots		16		
Turnout		1770	26.3	−11.2
Labour gain from Green		Swing	+10.1	

=== Arbury ward ===
Councillor Mike Todd-Jones was defending his Arbury seat for the Labour and Co-operative Party.

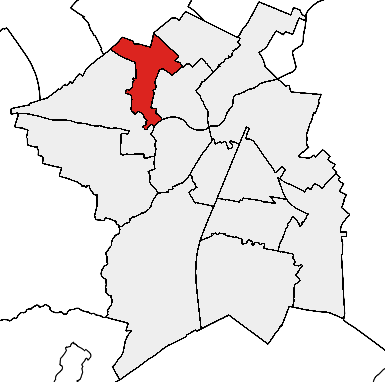
Arbury ward

Cambridge City Council Elections 2012: Arbury ward
Party	Candidate	Votes	%	±%
Labour	Mike Todd-Jones	1,322	59.9	+19.4
Liberal Democrats	Rhodri James	417	18.9	−12.5
Conservative	Ali Meftah	237	10.7	−3.1
Green	Stephen Lawrence	232	10.5	−1.1
Majority		905	41.0	+31.9
Rejected ballots		21		
Turnout		2208	32.7	−15.1
Labour hold		Swing	+16.0	

=== Castle ward ===
Councillor John Hipkin was defending his Castle seat as an independent candidate. Changes in vote is in comparison to 2008, when John Hipkin's seat was last contested.

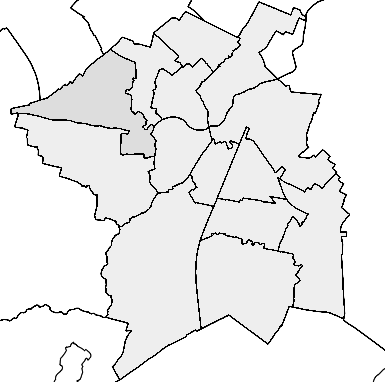
Castle ward

Cambridge City Council Elections 2012: Castle ward
Party	Candidate	Votes	%	±%
Independent	John Hipkin	925	49.5	+10.5
Labour	Ashley Walsh	330	17.7	+7.4
Liberal Democrats	Alan Levy	275	14.7	−17.7
Conservative	Nikesh Pandit	173	9.3	−2.4
Green	Jack Toye	164	8.8	+2.2
Majority		595	31.9	+25.3
Rejected ballots		5		
Turnout		1867		
Independent hold		Swing	+1.6	

=== Cherry Hinton ward ===
Councillor Robert Dryden was defending his Cherry Hinton seat for Labour.

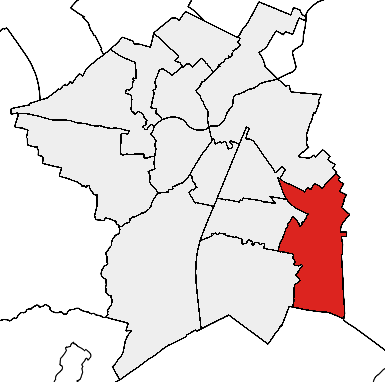
Cherry Hinton ward

Cambridge City Council Elections 2012: Cherry Hinton ward
Party	Candidate	Votes	%	±%
Labour	Robert Dryden	1556	73.2	+22.8
Conservative	Angela Ozturk	385	18.1	−11.4
Liberal Democrats	Keith Edkins	185	8.7	+1.1
Majority		1171	55.1	+35.4
Rejected ballots		16		
Turnout		2126		
Labour hold		Swing	+17.1	

=== Coleridge ward ===
Councillor George Owers was defending his Coleridge seat for Labour, having gained it in a 2010 by-election.

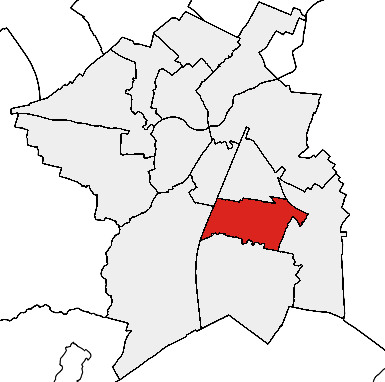
Coleridge ward

Cambridge City Council Elections 2012: Coleridge ward
Party	Candidate	Votes	%	±%
Labour	George Owers	1228	59.6	+12.7
Conservative	Sam Barker	422	20.5	−9.8
Green	Shaun Esgate	228	11.1	−1.7
Liberal Democrats	Thomas Yates	183	8.9	−1.0
Majority		806	39.1	+22.5
Rejected ballots		10		
Turnout		2061		
Labour hold		Swing	+11.3	

=== East Chesterton ward ===
Councillor Roman Znajek retired his East Chesterton seat. Tony Morris was aiming to retain the vacated seat for the Liberal Democrats.

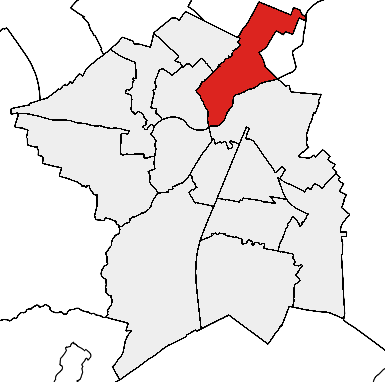
East Chesterton ward

Cambridge City Council Elections 2012: East Chesterton ward
Party	Candidate	Votes	%	±%
Labour	Margery Abbott	1,012	47.4	+9.0
Liberal Democrats	Tony Morris	438	20.5	−10.4
Conservative	Kevin Francis	317	14.8	−1.7
Green	Peter Pope	241	11.3	+0.6
UKIP	Peter Burkinshaw	129	6.0	+2.4
Majority		574	26.9	+19.4
Rejected ballots		10		
Turnout		2137		
Labour gain from Liberal Democrats		Swing	+9.7	

=== King's Hedges ward ===
Councillor Neil McGovern was defending his King's Hedges seat for the Liberal Democrats.

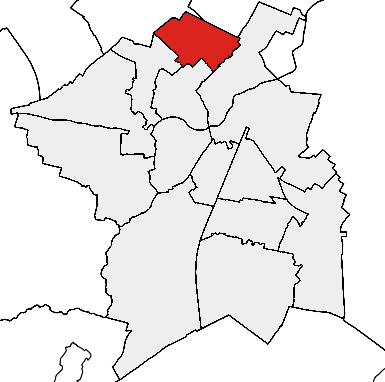
King's Hedges ward

Cambridge City Council Elections 2012: King's Hedges ward
Party	Candidate	Votes	%	±%
Labour	Nigel Gawthorpe	827	48.4	+8.4
Liberal Democrats	Neil McGovern	576	33.7	+1.4
Conservative	Annette Karimi	199	11.7	−5.6
United People's Party (UK)	Ian Tyes	105	6.2	+0.1
Majority		251	14.7	+7.0
Rejected ballots		12		
Turnout		1707		
Labour gain from Liberal Democrats		Swing	+3.5	

=== Market ward ===
Councillor Tim Bick was defending his Market seat for the Liberal Democrats.

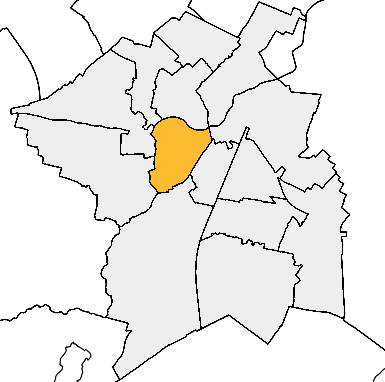
Market ward

Cambridge City Council Elections 2012: Market ward
Party	Candidate	Votes	%	±%
Liberal Democrats	Tim Bick	615	35.6	+7.6
Labour	Noel Kavanagh	505	29.3	+4.6
Green	Brett Hughes	349	20.2	−4.0
Conservative	Edward Turnham	257	14.9	−8.1
Majority		110	6.4	+3.1
Rejected ballots		13		
Turnout		1726		
Liberal Democrats hold		Swing	+1.5	

=== Newnham ward ===
Councillor Sian Reid was defending her Newnham seat for the Liberal Democrats.

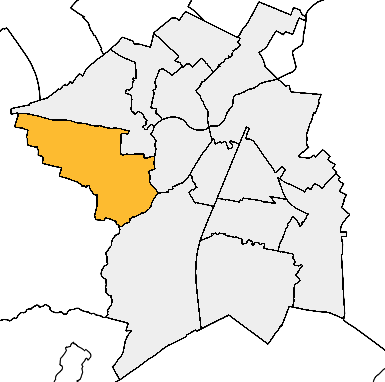
Newnham ward

Cambridge City Council Elections 2012: Newnham ward
Party	Candidate	Votes	%	±%
Liberal Democrats	Sian Reid	917	44.5	+9.3
Labour	Sarah Cain	641	31.1	+4.2
Conservative	Andre Beaumont	263	12.8	−9.3
Green	Billy Aldridge	241	11.7	−4.1
Majority		276	13.4	+5.1
Rejected ballots		14		
Turnout		2062		
Liberal Democrats hold		Swing	+2.6	

=== Petersfield ward ===
Councillor Gail Marchant-Daisley was defending her Petersfield seat for Labour.

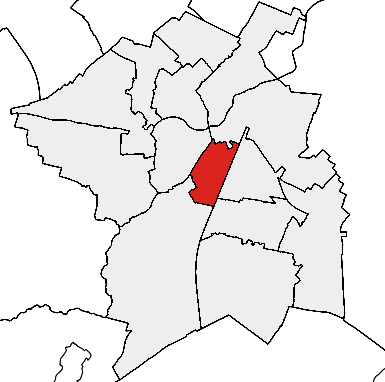
Petersfield ward

Cambridge City Council Elections 2012: Petersfield ward
Party	Candidate	Votes	%	±%
Labour	Gail Marchant-Daisley	1036	56.6	+7.7
Liberal Democrats	Zoe O'Connell	322	17.6	−3.9
Green	Sandra Billington	263	14.4	−3.0
Conservative	Pater Patrick	209	11.4	−0.9
Majority		714	39.0	+11.6
Rejected ballots		10		
Turnout		1830		
Labour hold		Swing	+5.8	

=== Queen Edith's ward ===
Councillor Amanda Taylor was defending her Queen Edith's seat for the Liberal Democrats.

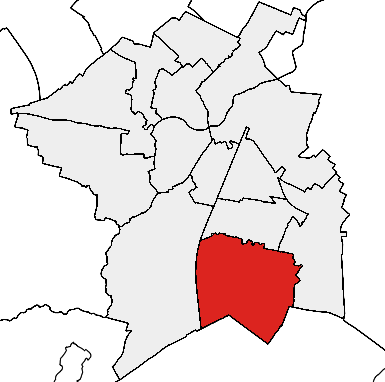
Queen Edith's ward

Cambridge City Council Elections 2012: Queen Edith's ward
Party	Candidate	Votes	%	±%
Labour	Sue Birtles	1048	38.9	+18.9
Liberal Democrats	Amanda Taylor	963	35.7	−5.4
Conservative	Richard Jeffs	513	19.0	−6.9
Green	Martin Lawson	172	6.4	−6.6
Majority		121	4.5	−10.7
Rejected ballots		14		
Turnout		2696		
Labour gain from Liberal Democrats		Swing	+12.2	

=== Romsey ward ===
Councillor Catherine Smart was defending her Romsey seat for the Liberal Democrats.

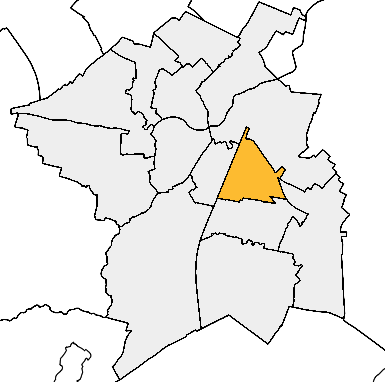
Romsey ward

Cambridge City Council Elections 2011: Romsey ward
Party	Candidate	Votes	%	±%
Liberal Democrats	Catherine Smart	1020	41.4	+12.3
Labour	Rachel Eckersley	813	33.0	−0.3
Cambridge Socialists	Tom Woodcock	457	18.5	+18.5
Conservative	Philip Salway	175	7.1	−4.9
Majority		207	8.4	+4.2
Rejected ballots		15		
Turnout		2465		
Liberal Democrats hold		Swing	+6.3	

=== Trumpington ward ===
Councillor Salah Al Bander was defending his Trumpington seat for the Liberal Democrats.

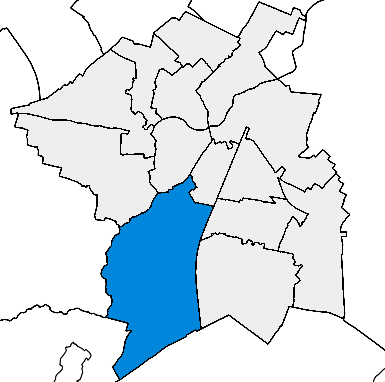
Trumpington ward

Cambridge City Council Elections 2012: Trumpington ward
Party	Candidate	Votes	%	±%
Conservative	Shapour Meftah	723	36.6	+4.9
Liberal Democrats	Salah Al Bander	644	32.6	−3.5
Labour	Kenny Latunde-Dada	321	16.3	−1.2
Green	Ceri Galloway	287	14.5	−0.1
Majority		79	4.0	+0.4
Rejected ballots		8		
Turnout		1975		
Conservative gain from Liberal Democrats		Swing	+4.2	

=== West Chesterton ward ===
Councillor Ian Nimmo-Smith retired his West Chesterton seat. Mike Pitt was aiming to retain the vacated seat for the Liberal Democrats.

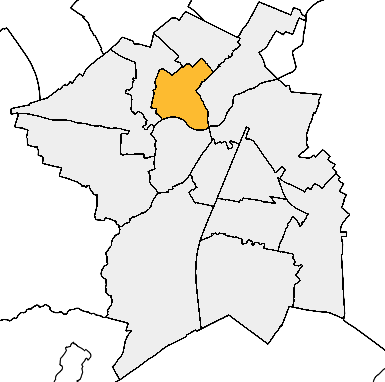
West Chesterton ward

Cambridge City Council Elections 2012: West Chesterton ward
Party	Candidate	Votes	%	±%
Liberal Democrats	Mike Pitt	840	36.7	−1.8
Labour	Mike Sargeant	751	32.8	+5.6
Conservative	James Strachan	372	16.3	−1.8
Green	Oliver Perkins	325	14.2	−1.9
Majority		89	3.9	−7.4
Rejected ballots		14		
Turnout		2288		
Liberal Democrats hold		Swing	-3.7	

== By-elections ==
=== Abbey ===
A by-election was called due to the resignation of incumbent Green Party councillor Adam Pogonowski.

Abbey: 2 May 2013
Party	Candidate	Votes	%	±%
Labour	Peter Roberts	878	51.4	−3.0
Green	Oliver Perkins	336	19.7	−4.2
Conservative	Eric Barrett-Payton	284	16.6	+4.2
Liberal Democrats	Marcus Streets	209	12.2	−3.0
Majority		542	31.7	
Turnout		1,707		
Labour gain from Green		Swing	▲0.6	
