= 2010 Cambridge City Council election =

2010 UK local government election

← 2008	6 May 2010	2012 →

16: one-third of 42 22 seats needed for a majority

	First party	Second party
Party	Labour	Liberal Democrats
Seat change	Steady	▲
Swing	▼	▲
	Third party	Fourth party
Party	Independent	Green
Seats won	0	0
Seats after		0
Seat change	Steady	▼
Swing	▲	▲
- Winner of each seat at the 2010 Cambridge City Council election

Elections to Cambridge City Council were held on 6 May 2010 as part of the wider local elections across England.

== Results summary ==
2010 Cambridge City Council election
Party	This election			Full council			This election		
Party	Seats	Net	Seats %	Other	Total	Total %	Votes	Votes %	+/−
Liberal Democrats	13	▲1	76.5	16	29	69.0	25,599	37.9	+5.1
Labour	3	▼2	17.6	6	9	21.4	15,237	22.5	-3.2
Green	1	▲1	5.9	1	2	4.8	11,011	16.3	+4.9
Conservative	0	Steady	0.0	1	1	2.4	14,849	22.0	-3.0
Independent	0	Steady	0.0	1	1	2.4	0	0.0	-2.9
Cambridge Socialists	0	Steady	0.0	0	0	0.0	640	0.9	N/A
UKIP	0	Steady	0.0	0	0	0.0	240	0.4	-0.2

== Ward results ==
=== Abbey ===
Abbey
Party	Candidate	Votes	%	±%
Green	Adam Pogonowski	1,104	29.7	−11.7
Liberal Democrats	Christopher Brown	1,010	27.1	+20.6
Labour	George Owers	848	22.8	−10.1
Conservative	Lara Hillman	758	20.4	+1.2
Majority				
Turnout				
Green gain from Labour		Swing		

=== Arbury ===
Arbury
Party	Candidate	Votes	%	±%
Liberal Democrats	Timothy Ward	1,633	38.9	+5.8
Labour	Ian Kidman	1,133	27.0	−8.3
Conservative	Ali Meftah	812	19.3	+1.7
Green	Stephen Lawrence	620	14.8	+7.8
Majority				
Turnout				
Liberal Democrats hold		Swing		

=== Castle ===
Castle
Party	Candidate	Votes	%	±%
Liberal Democrats	Simon Kightley	1,857	44.7	+12.3
Conservative	Warren Clegg	906	21.8	+10.1
Green	James Kennedy	749	18.0	+11.4
Labour	John Buckingham	641	15.4	+5.1
Majority				
Turnout				
Liberal Democrats hold		Swing		

=== Cherry Hinton ===
Cherry Hinton
Party	Candidate	Votes	%	±%
Labour	Stuart Newbold	1,610	38.4	−13.6
Conservative	Edward Macnaghten	1,231	29.4	−5.1
Liberal Democrats	Keith Edkins	1,023	24.4	+17.4
Green	Ross Pooley	328	7.8	+1.3
Majority				
Turnout				
Labour hold		Swing		

=== Coleridge ===
Coleridge
Party	Candidate	Votes	%	±%
Labour	Lewis Herbert	1,320	32.3	−7.3
Conservative	Andrew Bower	1,160	28.4	−11.8
Liberal Democrats	Thomas Yates	1,040	25.5	+16.3
Green	Valerie Hopkins	446	10.9	+2.8
UKIP	Albert Watts	118	2.9	+0.2
Majority				
Turnout				
Labour hold		Swing		

=== East Chesterton ===
East Chesterton
Party	Candidate	Votes	%	±%
Liberal Democrats	Susannah Kerr	1,477		
Liberal Democrats	Roman Zjanek	1,305		
Conservative	Kevin Francis	984		
Labour	Gerri Bird	859		
Conservative	Una McCormack	806		
Labour	Dan Cooper	776		
Green	Peter Pope	634		
Green	Matt Ellis	581		
Cambridge Socialists	Anna Gordon	137		
Majority				
Turnout				
Liberal Democrats hold		Swing		
Liberal Democrats hold		Swing		

=== King's Hedges ===
King's Hedges
Party	Candidate	Votes	%	±%
Liberal Democrats	Simon Brierley	1,236		
Labour	Elizabeth Hughes	986		
Conservative	Matthew Adams	813		
Green	Alexandra Collis	274		
Cambridge Socialists	Martin Booth	99		
Majority				
Turnout				
Liberal Democrats hold		Swing		

=== Market ===
Market
Party	Candidate	Votes	%	±%
Liberal Democrats	Colin Rosenstiel	1,697	43.0	−1.1
Conservative	James Boyd	894	22.7	−0.7
Green	Jack Toye	783	19.9	+4.7
Labour	Pam Stacey	571	14.5	−2.9
Majority				
Turnout				
Liberal Democrats hold		Swing		

=== Newnham ===
Newnham
Party	Candidate	Votes	%	±%
Liberal Democrats	Julie Smith	1,862	44.9	−5.2
Conservative	Stephen Oliver	994	24.0	−0.6
Labour	Len Freeman	648	15.6	+4.1
Green	James Youd	642	15.5	+1.8
Majority				
Turnout				
Liberal Democrats hold		Swing		

=== Petersfield ===
Petersfield
Party	Candidate	Votes	%	±%
Liberal Democrats	Sarah Brown	1,571		
Labour	Gail Marchant-Daisley	1,237		
Liberal Democrats	Andrea Reiner	1,000		
Green	Shayne Mitchell	923		
Labour	Kevin Blencowe	891		
Green	Hywel Sedgwick-Jell	575		
Conservative	Joshua Hordern	558		
Conservative	Shapour Meftah	472		
Majority				
Turnout				
Liberal Democrats gain from Labour		Swing		
Labour hold		Swing		

=== Queen's Edith ===
Queen's Edith
Party	Candidate	Votes	%	±%
Liberal Democrats	Jean Swanson	2,129	49.0	−0.9
Conservative	Vincenzo Marino	1,221	28.1	−4.6
Labour	Jonathan Goodacre	541	12.4	+3.1
Green	Brian Westcott	334	7.7	+0.4
UKIP	Carol Jackson	122	2.8	N/A
Majority				
Turnout				
Liberal Democrats hold		Swing		

=== Romsey ===
Romsey
Party	Candidate	Votes	%	±%
Liberal Democrats	Paul Saunders	1,615	38.0	+0.8
Labour	Edward Browne	928	21.9	−3.2
Green	Hannah Allum	697	16.4	+7.5
Conservative	Jane Slinn	600	14.1	+0.7
Cambridge Socialists	Tom Woodcock	404	9.5	−5.9
Majority				
Turnout				
Liberal Democrats hold		Swing		

=== Trumpington ===
Trumpington
Party	Candidate	Votes	%	±%
Liberal Democrats	Sheila Stuare	1,704	43.2	−2.7
Conservative	Julie Simpole-Clarke	1,236	31.3	−7.3
Labour	Kenny Latunde-Dada	559	14.2	+7.0
Green	Ceri Galloway	446	11.3	+3.0
Majority				
Turnout				
Liberal Democrats hold		Swing		

=== West Chesterton ===
West Chesterton
Party	Candidate	Votes	%	±%
Liberal Democrats	Max Boyce	1,881		
Liberal Democrats	Damien Tunnacliffe	1,559		
Green	Sarah Peake	1,201		
Labour	Paul McHugh	853		
Labour	Mike Seargeant	836		
Conservative	Anette Karimi	752		
Green	Stephen Peake	674		
Conservative	Jahanshah Karimi	652		
Majority				
Turnout				
Liberal Democrats hold		Swing		
Liberal Democrats hold		Swing		

== By-elections ==
=== Coleridge ===
A by-election was called due to the resignation of incumbent Conservative councillor Chris Howell.

Coleridge: 4 November 2010
Party	Candidate	Votes	%	±%
Labour	George Owers	900	44.0	+11.7
Conservative	Andrew Bower	734	35.9	+7.5
Liberal Democrats	Sarah Barnes	223	10.9	−14.6
Green	Valerie Hopkins	137	6.7	−4.2
UKIP	Albert Watts	53	2.6	−0.3
Majority		166	8.1	
Turnout		2,047		
Labour gain from Conservative		Swing	▲2.1	
