= Sarah Brown (politician) =

Transgender activist

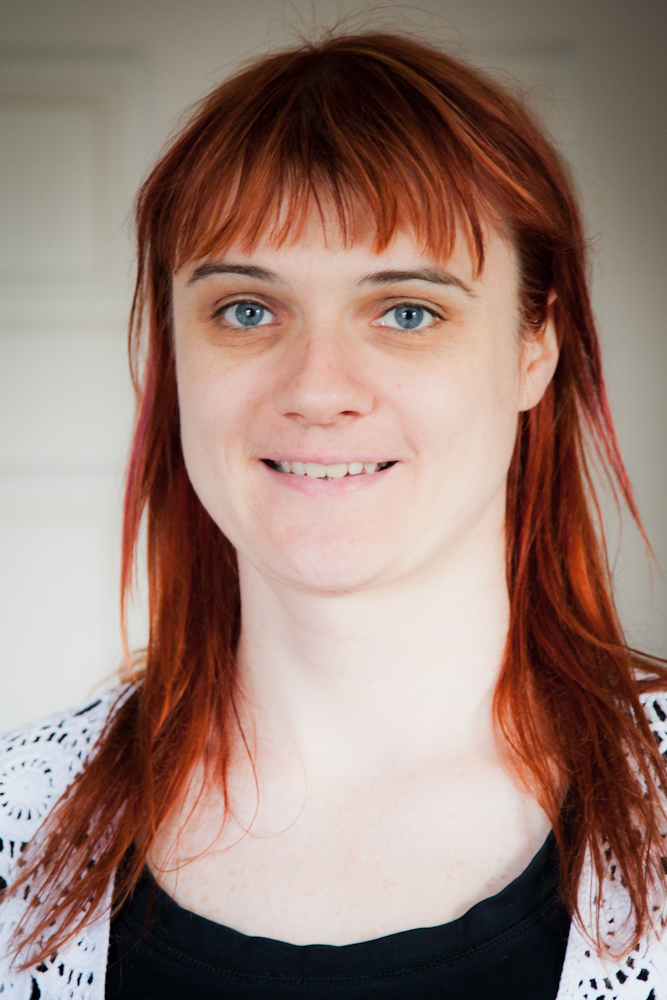

Cambridge City Councillor, Petersfield Ward
- In office 6 May 2010 – 23 May 2014

Personal details
- Born: 1972 or 1973 (age 52–53)
- Party: Liberal Democrats
- Spouse: Sylvia Knight
- Domestic partner: Zoe O'Connell
- Education: Trinity Hall, Cambridge

Sarah Brown is an English transgender activist and former Liberal Democrat politician. She was the Cambridge City Councillor for Petersfield ward between 2010 and 2014, serving as Executive Councillor for Community Wellbeing since 2013 and served as a member of the LGBT+ Liberal Democrats executive. She is a trans woman and, for several years, was the only openly transgender elected politician in the UK. In 2011, she appeared on the Independent on Sunday "Pink List" as the 28th most influential LGBT person in the UK, dropping to 34th in the 2012 list, but rising again to 27th in the 2013 list.

Brown is an advocate for equal marriage, and has several times discussed marriage laws as they affected her; her 2001 marriage to her wife Sylvia Knight was annulled upon gaining a Gender Recognition Certificate in 2009, and she described her subsequent civil partnership to Knight as a "kick in the teeth". Her case was cited during the report stage of the Marriage (Same-Sex Couples) Bill, when her MP Julian Huppert moved a series of amendments, which included a set intended to allow couples who dissolved their marriages under the Gender Recognition Act to retroactively restore their marriage.

Brown also advocates for improved provisions for transgender people under the National Health Service, and created the "#transdocfail" hashtag on Twitter and collated several thousand tweets talking about abuse of transgender patients that she alleges exposed "institutional transphobia" in the medical profession that "would be on the national news" if it "was happening to any other minority".

Brown is currently in a polyamorous relationship with Knight and fellow former Liberal Democrat and transgender activist Zoe O'Connell, although none of them describe themselves as "poly evangelists". All three partners contributed to a Guardian column discussing polyamory in the context of transition and Brown's previous marriage, which was later cited by Huppert during the Marriage (Same-Sex Couples) Bill debate.

She is currently a trustee of Cambridgeshire LGBT charity the Kite Trust and a member of Stonewall's Trans Advisory Group.

== Political career ==
Brown has contested local and Parliament elections in Cambridge. She was an elected Councillor for Petersfield from 2010 to 2014.

Elections contested by Sarah Brown
Date	Election	Seat	Result
6 May 2010	2010 Cambridge City Council election	Petersfield	1,571 - Elected
22 May 2014	2014 Cambridge City Council election	Petersfield	720 - Seat lost
3 May 2018	2018 Cambridge City Council election	Petersfield	432 - Not Elected
13 September 2018	Petersfield ward by-election, Cambridge	Petersfield	

Brown left the Liberal Democrats in September 2019 as part of a dispute over the acceptance of Phillip Lee.
