= 2015 Cambridge City Council election =

2015 UK local government election

- 7 May 2015

16: one-third of 42 22 seats needed for a majority

	First party	Second party
Party	Labour	Liberal Democrats
Seat change	Steady	▼
Swing	▼	▼
	Third party	Fourth party
Party	Independent	Green
Seat change	Steady	▲
Swing	▼	▲
- Winner of each seat at the 2015 Cambridge City Council election

The 2015 Cambridge City Council election took place on 7 May 2015 to elect members of Cambridge City Council in England as part of the English local elections of that year coinciding with the 2015 General Election.

== Results summary ==
2015 Cambridge City Council election
Party	This election			Full council			This election		
Party	Seats	Net	Seats %	Other	Total	Total %	Votes	Votes %	+/−
Labour	8	Steady	57.1	16	24	57.1	20,279	34.5	-6.3
Liberal Democrats	5	▼1	35.7	9	14	33.3	16,257	27.6	-2.0
Independent	0	Steady	0.0	1	2	4.8	89	0.2	-1.9
Conservative	0	Steady	0.0	1	1	2.4	10,266	17.5	+4.2
Green	1	▲1	7.1	0	1	2.4	9,675	16.5	+3.0
UKIP	0	Steady	0.0	0	0	0.0	2,261	3.8	+3.0

== Ward results ==
=== Abbey ===
Abbey
Party	Candidate	Votes	%	±%
Labour	Caroline Hart	1,645	42.5	−5.9
Liberal Democrats	Nichola Martin	831	21.5	+4.9
Green	Monica Hone	701	18.1	−2.6
Conservative	David Cowan	696	18.0	+3.9
Turnout				
Labour hold		Swing		

=== Arbury ===
Arbury
Party	Candidate	Votes	%	±%
Labour	Carina O'Reilly	1,673	39.1	−6.5
Liberal Democrats	Tim Ward	1,165	27.2	+1.9
Conservative	Eric Barrett-Payton	597	13.9	+0.4
Green	Stephen Lawrence	568	13.3	−2.3
UKIP	Celia Conway	281	6.6	N/A
Turnout				
Labour hold		Swing		

=== Castle ===
Castle
Party	Candidate	Votes	%	±%
Liberal Democrats	Valerie Holt	1,288	30.1	+3.6
Labour	Patrick Sheil	1,084	25.4	−4.5
Conservative	Simon Mitton	951	22.3	+11.9
Green	Martin Bonner	920	21.5	+6.4
Turnout				
Liberal Democrats hold		Swing		

=== Cherry Hinton ===
Cherry Hinton
Party	Candidate	Votes	%	±%
Labour Co-op	Mark Ashton	1,839	41.5	−38.5
Conservative	Timothy Haire	843	19.0	N/A
Liberal Democrats	Edward Sexton	790	17.8	−2.2
UKIP	Alex Crowson	393	8.9	N/A
Green	Phillip Barnett	364	8.2	N/A
Turnout				
Labour hold		Swing		

=== Coleridge ===
Coleridge
Party	Candidate	Votes	%	±%
Labour	Jeremy Benstead	1,606	38.1	−13.5
Liberal Democrats	Simon Cooper	1,044	24.8	+9.8
Conservative	Samuel Barker	748	17.8	+1.1
Green	Shaun Esgate	558	13.2	−0.7
UKIP	Bill Kaminski	259	6.1	N/A
Turnout				
Labour hold		Swing		

=== East Chesterton ===
East Chesterton
Party	Candidate	Votes	%	±%
Labour	Gerri Bird	1,630	38.9	+3.4
Liberal Democrats	Shahida Rahman	1,165	27.8	−7.4
Conservative	Alex Boyd	608	14.5	+5.9
Green	Peter Pope	466	11.1	+1.2
UKIP	Pater Burkinshaw	327	7.8	−2.0
Turnout				
Labour hold		Swing		

=== King's Hedges ===
King's Hedges
Party	Candidate	Votes	%	±%
Labour	Kevin Price	1,367	39.0	−2.2
Liberal Democrats	Hugh Newsam	726	20.7	−1.2
Conservative	Anette Karimi	552	15.7	+2.5
UKIP	Dave Corn	419	12.0	N/A
Green	Angela Ditchfield	355	10.1	−1.9
Turnout				
Labour hold		Swing		

=== Market ===
Market
Party	Candidate	Votes	%	±%
Green	Oscar Gillespie	1,147	27.7	+2.0
Labour	Danielle Greene	1,140	27.5	−4.7
Liberal Democrats	Dom Weldon	1,134	27.4	+2.9
Conservative	Daniel Coughlan	726	17.5	−0.3
Turnout				
Green gain from Liberal Democrats		Swing		

=== Newnham ===
Newnham
Party	Candidate	Votes	%	±%
Liberal Democrats	Markus Gehring	1,387	32.7	−2.9
Labour	Ewan McGaughey	1,203	28.4	−4.9
Green	Kate Honey	947	22.4	+4.6
Conservative	Sam Carr	700	16.5	+3.2
Turnout				
Liberal Democrats hold		Swing		

=== Petersfield ===
Petersfield
Party	Candidate	Votes	%	±%
Labour	Kevin Blencowe	1,632	44.0	−9.0
Green	Atus Mariqueo-Russell	864	23.3	+8.7
Liberal Democrats	Elizabeth Parkin	795	21.4	−0.6
Conservative	Ben Flook	422	11.4	+2.5
Turnout				
Labour hold		Swing		

=== Queen Edith's ===
Queen Edith's
Party	Candidate	Votes	%	±%
Liberal Democrats	George Pippas	1,502	33.7	−8.9
Labour	Matt Worth	1,102	24.7	−5.0
Conservative	Andrew Bower	1,093	24.5	+8.2
Green	Joel Chalfen	546	12.3	+0.9
UKIP	Candido Channell	213	4.8	N/A
Turnout				
Liberal Democrats hold		Swing		

=== Romsey ===
Romsey
Party	Candidate	Votes	%	±%
Labour	Anna Smith	1,636	37.7	−3.9
Liberal Democrats	Donald Adey	1,314	30.3	−7.5
Green	Jane Carpenter	951	21.9	+8.0
Conservative	Rahatul Raja	436	10.1	+3.0
Turnout				
Labour hold		Swing		

=== Trumpington ===
Trumpington
Party	Candidate	Votes	%	±%
Liberal Democrats	Zoe O'Connell	1,498	29.9	−16.3
Conservative	Daniel John	1,366	27.3	−7.6
Labour	Nick Gay	1,182	23.6	+4.5
Green	Ceri Galloway	751	15.0	N/A
UKIP	Richard Jeffs	213	4.6	N/A
Turnout				
Liberal Democrats hold		Swing		

=== West Chesterton ===
West Chesterton
Party	Candidate	Votes	%	±%
Liberal Democrats	Damien Tunnacliffe	1,618	37.0	−2.9
Labour	Mike Sargeant	1,540	35.2	+4.8
Green	Har Kaur	537	12.3	+1.7
Conservative	Linda Yeatman	528	12.1	+1.3
UKIP	Mary King	156	3.6	N/A
Turnout				
Liberal Democrats hold		Swing		
