= 2006 Cambridge City Council election =

2006 UK local government election

Map of the results

Elections for Cambridge City Council were held on Thursday 4 May 2006. As Cambridge City Council is elected by thirds, one seat in each of the city's 14 wards was up for election. The exception was Romsey, where two seats were up for election as a by-election for the other seat was held on the same day. Therefore, 15 of the 42 seats on the council were up for election. Overall turnout was 34.4%, down from 37.0% in 2004. The lowest turnout (28.4%) was in Abbey ward and the highest (40.8%) in Queen Edith's.

== Results summary ==
2006 Cambridge City Council election
Party	This election			Full council			This election		
Party	Seats	Net	Seats %	Other	Total	Total %	Votes	Votes %	+/−
Liberal Democrats	11	▲1	73.3	18	29	69.0	12,668	38.6	-2.7
Labour	4	Steady	26.7	9	13	31.0	8,328	25.4	-0.5
Conservative	0	▼1	0.0	0	0	0.0	7,015	21.4	-0.8
Green	0	Steady	0.0	0	0	0.0	4,124	12.6	+3.8
Respect	0	Steady	0.0	0	0	0.0	562	1.7	N/A
UKIP	0	Steady	0.0	0	0	0.0	138	0.4	-0.4

== Ward results ==
=== Abbey ===
Abbey
Party	Candidate	Votes	%	±%
Labour	Miriam Lynn	668	37.4	−3.0
Green	Margaret White	464	26.0	+8.1
Conservative	Simon Mitton	362	20.3	−1.3
Liberal Democrats	Edward Sexton	292	16.3	−3.8
Majority		204	11.4	N/A
Turnout		1,786	28.5	+0.7
Labour hold		Swing	▼5.6	

=== Arbury ===
Arbury
Party	Candidate	Votes	%	±%
Liberal Democrats	Timothy Ward	1,022	40.3	+4.2
Labour	Michael Todd-Jones	816	32.1	+4.0
Conservative	Shapour Meftah	482	19.0	−2.6
Green	Michael Smith	219	8.6	−5.6
Majority		206	8.2	N/A
Turnout		2,539	36.9	−6.3
Liberal Democrats hold		Swing	▲0.1	

=== Castle ===
Castle
Party	Candidate	Votes	%	±%
Liberal Democrats	Simon Kightley	985	48.3	+2.3
Conservative	Edward MacNaghten	476	23.3	+3.5
Green	Stephen Lawrence	298	14.6	−3.2
Labour	Lucy Sheerman	282	13.8	−2.6
Majority		509	25.0	N/A
Turnout		2,041	31.5	−1.6
Liberal Democrats hold		Swing	▼0.6	

=== Cherry Hinton ===
Cherry Hinton
Party	Candidate	Votes	%	±%
Labour	Stuart Newbold	1,071	42.9	+1.8
Conservative	Eric Barrett-Payton	864	34.6	+1.5
Liberal Democrats	Natalie Mayer-Hutchings	367	14.7	−3.2
Green	Neil Ford	193	7.7	−0.1
Majority		207	8.3	N/A
Turnout		2,495	39.7	−6.7
Labour gain from Conservative		Swing	▲0.2	

=== Coleridge ===
Coleridge
Party	Candidate	Votes	%	±%
Labour	Lewis Herbert	909	41.8	+8.0
Liberal Democrats	Andrew Blackhurst	477	22.0	+0.8
Conservative	Stephen Jones	463	21.3	−0.9
Green	Hamish Downer	186	8.6	−6.1
UKIP	Albert Watts	138	6.4	−1.7
Majority		432	19.8	N/A
Turnout		2,173	36.3	−0.8
Labour hold		Swing	▲3.6	

=== East Chesterton ===
East Chesterton
Party	Candidate	Votes	%	±%
Liberal Democrats	Marian Holness	884	40.6	+4.8
Labour	Richard Layfield	583	26.8	+1.4
Conservative	Kevin Francis	482	22.1	+6.7
Green	Peter Pope	228	10.5	−4.0
Majority		301	13.8	N/A
Turnout		2,177	35.9	−1.2
Liberal Democrats hold		Swing	▲1.7	

=== King's Hedges ===
King's Hedges
Party	Candidate	Votes	%	±%
Liberal Democrats	Neale Upstone	718	40.0	+14.0
Labour	Gerri Bird	533	29.7	−2.6
Conservative	Mark Taylor	350	19.5	−8.0
Green	Gerhard Golbeck-Wood	193	10.8	−3.3
Majority		185	10.3	N/A
Turnout		1,794	29.6	+2.0
Liberal Democrats gain from Labour		Swing	▲8.3	

=== Market ===
Market
Party	Candidate	Votes	%	±%
Liberal Democrats	Colin Rosenstiel	772	42.7	+1.8
Conservative	Timothy Haire	392	21.7	+3.5
Green	Martin Lucas-Smith	359	19.9	+2.8
Labour	Maureen Donnelly	285	15.8	+4.9
Majority		380	21.0	N/A
Turnout		1,808	28.7	−1.2
Liberal Democrats hold		Swing	▼0.9	

=== Newnham ===
Newnham
Party	Candidate	Votes	%	±%
Liberal Democrats	Rod Cantrill	974	46.2	−0.8
Conservative	James Strachan	475	22.6	+2.8
Labour	Joseph Powell	336	16.0	+1.4
Green	Anna Gomori-Woodcock	321	15.2	−3.3
Majority		499	23.7	N/A
Turnout		2,106	31.7	+0.1
Liberal Democrats hold		Swing	▼1.0	

=== Petersfield ===
Petersfield
Party	Candidate	Votes	%	±%
Labour	Kevin Blencowe	879	39.0	+4.3
Liberal Democrats	Steven Cooper	848	37.7	+3.4
Green	John Collins	282	12.5	−2.7
Conservative	Rosemary Clarkson	243	10.8	−1.1
Majority		31	1.4	N/A
Turnout		2,252	35.8	−1.3
Labour hold		Swing	▲0.5	

=== Queen's Edith ===
Queen's Edith
Party	Candidate	Votes	%	±%
Liberal Democrats	Alan Baker	1,489	56.7	+3.6
Conservative	Donald Douglas	735	28.0	+7.2
Labour	Leonard Freeman	219	8.3	−0.5
Green	Shayne Mitchell	181	6.9	−3.8
Majority		754	28.7	N/A
Turnout		2,624	40.8	−2.8
Liberal Democrats hold		Swing	▼1.8	

=== Romsey ===
Romsey (2 seats due to by-election)
Party	Candidate	Votes	%
Liberal Democrats	Sarah Ellis-Miller	1,065	44.6
Liberal Democrats	Raj Shah	815	34.1
Labour	Jonathan Goodacre	623	26.1
Labour	Tariq Sadiq	491	20.6
Green	Jesse Griffiths	358	15.0
Respect	Thomas Woodcock	294	12.3
Respect	Samuel Caldwell	268	11.2
Conservative	Hugh Mennie	235	9.8
Green	Neil Hewett	216	9.0
Conservative	Angela Ozturk	216	9.0
Turnout		2,388	37.0
Liberal Democrats hold			
Liberal Democrats hold			

=== Trumpington ===
Trumpington
Party	Candidate	Votes	%	±%
Liberal Democrats	Sheila Stuart	960	45.5	−1.9
Conservative	John Ionides	752	35.7	+4.6
Green	Ceri Galloway	205	9.7	−4.1
Labour	Pamela Stacey	191	9.1	+1.4
Majority		208	9.8	N/A
Turnout		2,108	39.5	−2.9
Liberal Democrats hold		Swing	▼3.3	

=== West Chesterton ===
West Chesterton
Party	Candidate	Votes	%	±%
Liberal Democrats	Max Boyce	1,000	42.5	−4.6
Conservative	Steven Mastin	488	20.8	+3.5
Labour	Simon Watkins	442	18.8	+0.6
Green	Sarah Peake	421	17.9	+0.5
Majority		512	21.8	N/A
Turnout		2,351	36.7	−4.1
Liberal Democrats hold		Swing	▼4.1	

== Sources ==
- Cambridge City Council: Local election results
- Cambridge City Council: 2006 local election full results
- Cambridge City Election Results since 1945

== See also ==
- Cambridge local elections
- 2006 United Kingdom local elections
- Elections in the United Kingdom
