= 1978 Cambridge City Council election =

1978 English local election

← 1976	4 May 1978	1979 →

14 out of 42 seats to Cambridge City Council 22 seats needed for a majority
- Turnout: 38.6% (▼3.9%)

	First party	Second party
Party	Conservative	Labour
Last election	24 seats, 50.2%	16 seats, 39.2%
Seats won	7	6
Seats after	22	17
Seat change	▼2	▲1
Popular vote	14,262	12,304
Percentage	46.4%	40.1%
Swing	▼3.8%	▲0.9%
	Third party	Fourth party
Party	Liberal	Independent
Last election	2 seats, 9.1%	N/A
Seats won	0	1
Seats after	2	1
Seat change	Steady	▲1
Popular vote	2,295	1,776
Percentage	7.5%	5.8%
Swing	▼1.6%	N/A
- Winner of each seat at the 1978 Cambridge City Council election
Council control before election
Conservative
Council control after election
Conservative

The 1978 Cambridge City Council election took place on 4 May 1978 to elect members of Cambridge City Council in Cambridge, Cambridgeshire, England. This was on the same day as other local elections across England.

== Summary ==
=== Election result ===
1978 Cambridge City Council election
Party	This election			Full council			This election		
Party	Seats	Net	Seats %	Other	Total	Total %	Votes	Votes %	+/−
Conservative	7	▼2	50.0	15	22	52.4	14,262	46.4	–3.8
Labour	6	▲1	42.9	11	17	40.5	12,304	40.1	+0.9
Liberal	0	Steady	0.0	2	2	4.8	2,295	7.5	–1.6
Independent	1	▲1	7.1	0	1	2.4	1,776	5.8	N/A
Communist	0	Steady	0.0	0	0	0.0	79	0.3	–0.1

== Ward results ==
=== Abbey ===
Abbey
Party	Candidate	Votes	%	±%
Labour	Alec Molt*	830	67.1	+14.9
Conservative	Edna Jones	407	32.9	–3.4
Majority		423	34.2	N/A
Turnout		1,237	26.6	–5.0
Registered electors		4,647		
Labour hold		Swing	▲9.2	

=== Arbury ===
Arbury
Party	Candidate	Votes	%	±%
Labour	Barbara May	1,314	53.7	+2.2
Conservative	Sheila Jones	1,135	46.3	–2.2
Majority		179	7.3	N/A
Turnout		2,449	43.5	–1.9
Registered electors		5,632		
Labour hold		Swing	▲2.2	

=== Castle ===
Castle
Party	Candidate	Votes	%	±%
Conservative	George Reid*	1,082	44.0	–16.8
Labour	Richard Kimber	842	34.2	–5.0
Liberal	Andrew Gore	537	21.8	N/A
Majority		240	9.8	N/A
Turnout		2,461	41.3	–3.5
Registered electors		5,953		
Conservative hold		Swing	▼5.9	

=== Cherry Hinton ===
Cherry Hinton
Party	Candidate	Votes	%	±%
Conservative	Colin Barker	1,321	52.0	–3.3
Labour	Anthony Carter	1,217	48.0	+3.3
Majority		104	4.0	N/A
Turnout		2,538	48.0	+2.3
Registered electors		5,284		
Conservative hold		Swing	▼3.3	

=== Coleridge ===
Coleridge
Party	Candidate	Votes	%	±%
Conservative	Charles Seagrove	979	48.5	+2.1
Labour	James Curley	860	42.6	+3.3
Liberal	Philip Mitchell	178	8.8	–5.5
Majority		119	5.9	N/A
Turnout		2,017	39.0	–8.3
Registered electors		5,168		
Conservative hold		Swing	▼0.6	

=== East Chesterton ===
East Chesterton
Party	Candidate	Votes	%	±%
Conservative	Sidney Miller*	1,277	58.3	+0.1
Labour	Richard Wall	912	41.7	–0.1
Majority		365	16.7	N/A
Turnout		2,189	34.6	–4.7
Registered electors		6,332		
Conservative hold		Swing	▲0.1	

=== Kings Hedges ===
Kings Hedges
Party	Candidate	Votes	%	±%
Labour	Philip Geoghan*	793	56.2	–0.9
Conservative	Malcolm Mackenzie	474	33.6	–9.3
Liberal	Brian Badcock	145	10.3	N/A
Majority		319	22.6	N/A
Turnout		1,412	34.6	–12.8
Registered electors		4,083		
Labour hold		Swing	▲4.2	

=== Market ===
Market
Party	Candidate	Votes	%	±%
Independent	Margaret Reiss	1,776	71.2	N/A
Conservative	Graham Edwards*	718	28.8	+4.0
Majority		1,058	42.4	N/A
Turnout		2,494	38.5	–0.2
Registered electors		6,473		
Independent gain from Conservative				

=== Newnham ===
Newnham
Party	Candidate	Votes	%	±%
Labour	Wendy Nicol	1,501	49.1	+6.6
Conservative	Ella Craigie	987	32.3	–5.8
Liberal	Anthony Waite	567	18.6	–0.8
Majority		514	16.8	N/A
Turnout		3,055	44.9	+0.1
Registered electors		6,809		
Labour hold		Swing	▲6.2	

=== Petersfield ===
Petersfield
Party	Candidate	Votes	%	±%
Labour	Frank Gawthrop	1,218	49.9	+9.2
Conservative	Elaine Wheatley*	1,022	41.9	+1.0
Liberal	Keith Edkins	201	8.2	N/A
Majority		196	8.0	N/A
Turnout		2,441	40.0	+2.1
Registered electors		6,101		
Labour gain from Conservative		Swing	▲4.1	

=== Queens Edith ===
Queens Edith
Party	Candidate	Votes	%	±%
Conservative	James Johnson*	1,569	70.3	+12.4
Labour	Stephen Dartford	663	29.7	+8.3
Majority		906	40.6	N/A
Turnout		2,232	36.5	–10.4
Registered electors		6,114		
Conservative hold		Swing	▲2.1	

=== Romsey ===
Romsey
Party	Candidate	Votes	%	±%
Labour	Terence Sweeney*	989	49.4	+4.2
Conservative	Philip Robinson	601	30.0	–2.9
Liberal	Alan Charlesworth	380	19.0	–2.8
Communist	Julian Chaloner	31	1.5	N/A
Majority		388	19.4	N/A
Turnout		2,001	35.0	–1.2
Registered electors		5,722		
Labour hold		Swing	▲3.6	

=== Trumpington ===
Trumpington
Party	Candidate	Votes	%	±%
Conservative	Millicent Suckling*	1,406	62.1	–5.1
Labour	Stephen Watts	524	23.1	–9.7
Liberal	David Green	287	12.7	N/A
Communist	David Mourton	48	2.1	N/A
Majority		882	38.9	N/A
Turnout		2,265	38.5	–5.7
Registered electors		5,880		
Conservative hold		Swing	▲2.3	

=== West Chesterton ===
West Chesterton
Party	Candidate	Votes	%	±%
Conservative	Chris Gough-Goodman*	1,284	66.7	+5.9
Labour	Richard Overy	641	33.3	–5.9
Majority		643	33.4	N/A
Turnout		1,925	36.2	–5.4
Registered electors		5,318		
Conservative hold		Swing	▲5.9	
