= 1980 Cambridge City Council election =

1980 English local election

← 1979	1 May 1980	1982 →

14 out of 42 seats to Cambridge City Council 22 seats needed for a majority
- Turnout: 41.8% (▼30.0%)

	First party	Second party
Party	Labour	Conservative
Last election	18 seats, 39.0%	20 seats, 38.0%
Seats won	8	4
Seats after	21	16
Seat change	▲3	▼4
Popular vote	13,964	12,496
Percentage	42.8%	38.3%
Swing	▲3.8%	▲0.3%
	Third party	Fourth party
Party	Liberal	Independent
Last election	3 seats, 22.9%	1 seat, 0.0%
Seats won	2	0
Seats after	4	1
Seat change	▲1	Steady
Popular vote	5,990	0
Percentage	18.4%	0.0%
Swing	▼4.5%	N/A
- Winner of each seat at the 1980 Cambridge City Council election
Council control before election
No overall control
Council control after election
No overall control

The 1980 Cambridge City Council election took place on 1 May 1980 to elect members of Cambridge City Council in Cambridge, Cambridgeshire, England. This was on the same day as other local elections across England.

== Summary ==
=== Election result ===
1980 Cambridge City Council election
Party	This election			Full council			This election		
Party	Seats	Net	Seats %	Other	Total	Total %	Votes	Votes %	+/−
Labour	8	▲3	57.1	13	21	50.0	13,964	42.8	+3.8
Conservative	4	▼4	28.6	12	16	38.1	12,496	38.3	+0.3
Liberal	2	▲1	14.3	2	4	9.5	5,990	18.4	–4.5
Independent	0	Steady	0.0	1	1	2.4	N/A	N/A	N/A
Ecology	0	Steady	0.0	0	0	0.0	145	0.4	N/A

== Ward results ==
=== Abbey ===
Abbey
Party	Candidate	Votes	%	±%
Labour	Richard Smith	1,169	71.6	+11.7
Conservative	Edna Jones	365	22.4	–5.8
Liberal	David Green	99	6.1	–5.8
Majority		804	49.2	+17.5
Turnout		1,633	34.5	–35.5
Registered electors		4,740		
Labour hold		Swing	▲8.8	

=== Arbury ===
Arbury
Party	Candidate	Votes	%	±%
Labour	Elizabeth Gard*	1,272	52.6	+7.7
Conservative	Patrick Harris	922	38.2	–1.0
Liberal	Charles Burch	222	9.2	–6.7
Majority		350	14.5	+8.7
Turnout		2,416	44.2	–27.6
Registered electors		5,463		
Labour hold		Swing	▲4.4	

=== Castle ===
Castle
Party	Candidate	Votes	%	±%
Liberal	Alan Charlesworth	1,162	43.5	–6.4
Conservative	Neville Auker*	984	36.9	+10.1
Labour	Joan Robinson	524	19.6	–3.7
Majority		178	6.7	–16.4
Turnout		2,670	45.2	–27.3
Registered electors		5,913		
Liberal gain from Conservative		Swing	▼8.3	

=== Cherry Hinton ===
Cherry Hinton
Party	Candidate	Votes	%	±%
Labour	John Woodhouse	1,382	52.6	+8.4
Conservative	John Phillips*	1,059	40.3	–1.0
Liberal	Ann Corsellis	187	7.1	–7.4
Majority		323	12.3	+9.3
Turnout		2,628	50.3	–27.5
Registered electors		5,225		
Labour gain from Conservative		Swing	▲4.7	

=== Coleridge ===
Coleridge
Party	Candidate	Votes	%	±%
Labour	Mark Todd	1,236	49.0	+10.2
Conservative	Donald Mackay*	998	39.5	–5.8
Liberal	Geoffrey Heathcock	291	11.5	–4.4
Majority		238	9.4	N/A
Turnout		2,525	48.6	–26.1
Registered electors		5,193		
Labour gain from Conservative		Swing	▲8.0	

=== East Chesterton ===
East Chesterton
Party	Candidate	Votes	%	±%
Conservative	Graham Knowles*	1,245	45.7	–1.5
Labour	Carey Widdows	1,239	45.5	+8.7
Liberal	Anita Anderson	238	8.7	–7.3
Majority		6	0.2	–10.2
Turnout		2,722	44.7	–25.6
Registered electors		6,088		
Conservative hold		Swing	▼5.1	

=== Kings Hedges ===
Kings Hedges
Party	Candidate	Votes	%	±%
Labour	Peter Cowell*	1,134	70.6	+18.3
Conservative	Jane Jenkins	344	21.4	–10.6
Liberal	Brian Badcock	128	8.0	–7.7
Majority		790	49.2	+28.9
Turnout		1,606	36.5	–34.0
Registered electors		4,398		
Labour hold		Swing	▲14.5	

=== Market ===
Market
Party	Candidate	Votes	%	±%
Liberal	Colin Rosenstiel*	1,036	50.8	+3.6
Conservative	Michael O'Hannah	566	27.8	+1.3
Labour	Gwilym Colseno	436	21.4	–4.8
Majority		470	23.1	+2.4
Turnout		2,038	33.5	–32.5
Registered electors		6,082		
Liberal hold		Swing	▲1.2	

=== Newnham ===
Newnham
Party	Candidate	Votes	%	±%
Labour	Gwyneth Lipstein*	1,215	47.9	+0.7
Conservative	Stanley Craigie	852	33.6	+7.1
Liberal	Shirley Fozzard	467	18.4	–7.8
Majority		363	14.3	–6.4
Turnout		2,534	37.6	–34.0
Registered electors		6,733		
Labour hold		Swing	▼3.2	

=== Petersfield ===
Petersfield
Party	Candidate	Votes	%	±%
Labour	Jill Tufnell	1,434	52.9	+4.0
Conservative	Elizabeth Sergeant*	898	33.1	–2.2
Liberal	Patrick Browne	236	8.7	–7.1
Ecology	Julian Paren	145	5.3	N/A
Majority		536	19.8	+6.2
Turnout		2,713	46.5	–18.6
Registered electors		5,836		
Labour gain from Conservative		Swing	▲3.1	

=== Queens Edith ===
Queens Edith
Party	Candidate	Votes	%	±%
Conservative	Graham Edwards	1,361	46.0	–5.4
Liberal	Bruce Galloway	1,016	34.4	+12.4
Labour	Ethel Shepherd	579	19.6	–7.0
Majority		345	11.7	–13.1
Turnout		2,956	50.1	–26.0
Registered electors		5,902		
Conservative hold		Swing	▼8.9	

=== Romsey ===
Romsey
Party	Candidate	Votes	%	±%
Labour	Peter Wright*	1,214	59.3	+10.0
Conservative	Barry Wright	553	27.0	–4.1
Liberal	Richard Folley	279	13.6	–5.9
Majority		661	32.3	+14.1
Turnout		2,046	36.4	–31.6
Registered electors		5,620		
Labour hold		Swing	▲7.1	

=== Trumpington ===
Trumpington
Party	Candidate	Votes	%	±%
Conservative	R Wright	1,226	56.5	+4.6
Labour	S Watts	598	27.6	+0.2
Liberal	J Walker	345	15.9	–3.3
Majority		628	29.0	+4.5
Turnout		2,169	39.1	–31.0
Registered electors		5,549		
Conservative hold		Swing	▲2.2	

=== West Chesterton ===
West Chesterton
Party	Candidate	Votes	%	±%
Conservative	Maurice Garner*	1,123	57.9	+8.0
Labour	Richard Wall	532	27.4	–2.8
Liberal	Anthony Waite	284	14.6	–5.2
Majority		591	30.5	+10.8
Turnout		1,939	36.9	–32.2
Registered electors		5,249		
Conservative hold		Swing	▲5.4	

== By-elections ==
=== Romsey ===
Romsey: December 1981
Party	Candidate	Votes	%	±%
SDP (Alliance)	Cathy Grove	947	47.6	
Labour	Leonard Freeman	862	43.3	
Conservative	Stephen George	180	9.0	
Majority		85	4.3	
Turnout		1,989		
SDP gain from Labour		Swing		
