= 2018 Cambridge City Council election =

English local government election

- 3 May 2018

16 seats up for election 22 seats needed for a majority

	First party	Second party
Party	Labour	Liberal Democrats
Seat change	▲	Steady
Swing	▲	▲
	Third party	Fourth party
Party	Independent	Green
Seat change	Steady	Steady
Swing	▲	▼

Map of the results of the 2018 Cambridge City Council election. Labour in red and Liberal Democrats in yellow.

The 2018 Cambridge City Council election took place on 3 May 2018 to elect members of Cambridge City Council in England. This was on the same day as other nationwide local elections.

== Results summary ==
2018 Cambridge City Council election
Party	This election				Full council			This election		
Party	Candidates	Seats	Net	Seats %	Other	Total	Total %	Votes	Votes %	+/−
Labour	{{{candidates}}}	10	▲1	66.7	17	27	64.3	17,086	46.4	+0.5
Liberal Democrats	{{{candidates}}}	5	Steady	33.3	8	13	31.0	11,736	31.9	+4.4
Green	{{{candidates}}}	0	Steady	0.0	1	1	2.4	3,206	8.7	-1.3
Independent	{{{candidates}}}	0	▼1	0.0	1	1	2.4	0	0.0	-2.3
Conservative	{{{candidates}}}	0	Steady	0.0	0	0	0.0	4,681	12.7	+0.9
UKIP	{{{candidates}}}	0	Steady	0.0	0	0	0.0	93	0.3	-2.2
Libertarian	{{{candidates}}}	0	Steady	0.0	0	0	0.0	26	0.1	New

== Ward results ==
Map showing the wards of Cambridge Council

=== Abbey ===
Abbey
Party	Candidate	Votes	%	±%
Labour	Nicky Massey	1,283	57.0	−4.3
Liberal Democrats	Nicky Shepard	466	20.7	+7.5
Conservative	David Philip Smith	263	11.7	+0.7
Green	Naomi Anne Bennett	240	10.6	−3.9
Turnout		2,252		
Labour hold		Swing		

=== Arbury ===
Arbury
Party	Candidate	Votes	%	±%
Labour	Patrick Sheil	1,250	51.8	−9.7
Liberal Democrats	Tim Ward	595	24.6	+8.8
Conservative	Dylan Coll-Reed	351	14.5	+2.4
Green	Stephen Roger Lawrence	219	9.1	−1.4
Turnout		2,415		
Labour hold		Swing		

=== Castle ===
Castle
Party	Candidate	Votes	%	±%
Liberal Democrats	Cheney-Anne Payne	957	40.8	+21.8
Labour	Mark Reader	932	39.8	+12.3
Conservative	Othman Bankole Cole	245	10.5	+4.2
Green	Lucas Ruzowitzky	184	7.8	−1.5
Libertarian	Aidan Powlesland	26	1.1	New
Turnout				
Liberal Democrats gain from Independent		Swing		

=== Cherry Hinton ===
Cherry Hinton
Party	Candidate	Votes	%	±%
Labour	Russ McPherson	1,282	56.8	−4.0
Conservative	Eric William Barrett-Payton	441	19.5	+3.3
Liberal Democrats	John Louis Oakes	364	16.1	+6.8
Green	Jenny Richens	171	7.6	+1.3
Turnout		2,258		
Labour hold		Swing		

=== Coleridge ===
Coleridge
Party	Candidate	Votes	%	±%
Labour	Lewis Herbert	1,303	55.9	−4.4
Liberal Democrats	Lindsey Noah Tate	410	17.6	+7.6
Conservative	Donald Fisher Douglas	388	16.7	+1.9
Green	Sarah Louise Nicmanis	228	9.8	+1.8
Turnout		2,329		
Labour hold		Swing		

=== East Chesterton ===
East Chesterton
Party	Candidate	Votes	%	±%
Labour	Carla Louise McQueen	1,362	50.5	+8.9
Labour	Baijumon Thittalayil Varkey	1,107	41.1	−0.5
Liberal Democrats	Owen Stewart Dunn	830	30.8	−3.4
Liberal Democrats	Shahida Rahman	811	30.1	−4.1
Green	Gareth Peter Bailey	345	12.8	+6.1
Conservative	Thomas Hedley Fairfax Harwood	336	12.5	+2.6
Conservative	Timur Coskun	299	11.1	+1.2
UKIP	Peter Burkinshaw	93	3.5	−4.1
Turnout				
Labour hold		Swing		
Labour hold		Swing		

Two seats were up due to the resignation of Margery Abbott (Labour, elected 2016)

=== King's Hedges ===
King's Hedges
Party	Candidate	Votes	%	±%
Labour	Martin Smart	924	51.7	−2.8
Liberal Democrats	Daniele Josephine Gibney	397	22.2	+8.5
Conservative	Anette Karimi	302	16.9	+5.1
Green	Angela Ditchfield	165	9.2	+0.8
Turnout		1,788		
Labour hold		Swing		

=== Market ===
Market
Party	Candidate	Votes	%	±%
Liberal Democrats	Anthony William Martinelli	866	43.5	+5.0
Labour	Dan Ratcliffe	744	37.3	+1.8
Green	Jeremy Lloyd Caddick	229	11.5	−8.4
Conservative	Henry James Mitson	153	7.7	+1.5
Turnout		1,992		
Liberal Democrats gain from Labour		Swing		

=== Newnham ===
Newnham
Party	Candidate	Votes	%	±%
Liberal Democrats	Rod Cantrill	1,139	49.7	+6.5
Labour	Michael Davey	825	36.0	−0.2
Conservative	Connor Gregory George MacDonald	165	7.2	−3.6
Green	Mark Slade	164	7.2	−2.7
Turnout		2,293		
Liberal Democrats hold		Swing		

=== Petersfield ===
Petersfield
Party	Candidate	Votes	%	±%
Labour	Ann Marie Sinnott	1,256	58.3	−3.1
Liberal Democrats	Sarah Brown	432	20.0	+7.0
Green	Virgil Au Wenhan Ierubino	278	12.9	−2.2
Conservative	Simon Lee	189	8.8	−1.6
Turnout		2,155		
Labour hold		Swing		

=== Queen Edith's ===
Queen Edith's
Party	Candidate	Votes	%	±%
Liberal Democrats	Colin Stephen McGerty	1,259	44.2	+1.2
Labour	Dan Greef	827	29.0	±0.0
Conservative	Manas Deb	543	19.1	−0.6
Green	Joel Chalfen	218	7.7	−0.7
Turnout		2,847		
Liberal Democrats hold		Swing		

=== Romsey ===
Romsey
Party	Candidate	Votes	%	±%
Labour	Dave Baigent	1,461	59.3	+9.6
Liberal Democrats	Joshua Guy Blanchard Lewis	563	22.9	−12.9
Green	Caitlin Ruth Patterson	269	10.9	+1.3
Conservative	Martin Keegan	170	6.9	+2.0
Turnout		2,463		
Labour hold		Swing		

=== Trumpington ===
Trumpington
Party	Candidate	Votes	%	±%
Labour	Katie Thornburrow	1,302	37.7	+12.0
Liberal Democrats	Dan Hilken	1,298	37.6	−3.7
Conservative	Philip James Salway	561	16.2	−6.4
Green	Ceri Barbara Galloway	293	8.5	−1.9
Turnout		3,454		
Labour gain from Liberal Democrats		Swing		

=== West Chesterton ===
West Chesterton
Party	Candidate	Votes	%	±%
Liberal Democrats	Jamie Dalzell	1,349	44.2	+6.1
Labour	Clare Frances King	1,228	40.2	−6.5
Conservative	Michael John Harford	275	9.0	+3.0
Green	Shayne Mary Mitchell	203	6.6	+0.1
Turnout		3,055		
Liberal Democrats hold		Swing		
