= 2011 Cambridge City Council election =

2011 UK local government election

- 5 May 2011

16: plus by-election 22 seats needed for a majority

	First party	Second party
Party	Labour	Liberal Democrats
Seat change	▲	▼
Swing	▲	▼
	Third party	Fourth party
Party	Independent	Green
Seat change	Steady	Steady
Swing	▲	▼
- Winner of each seat at the 2011 Cambridge City Council election

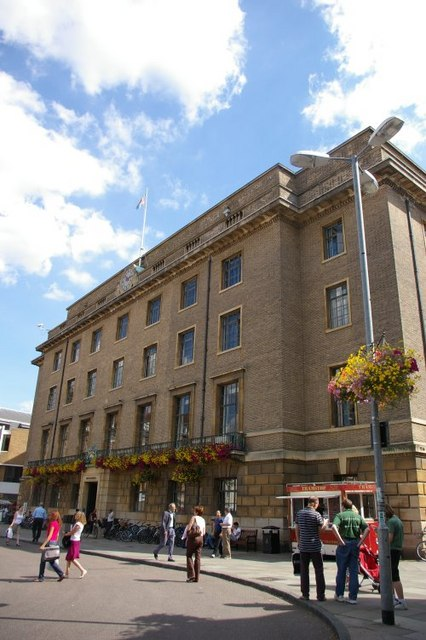
The Guildhall, Cambridge, where City Councillors meet.

Elections for Cambridge City Council (in Cambridge, England) were held on Thursday 5 May 2011. As the council is elected by thirds, one seat in each of the wards was up for election, with the exception of Cherry Hinton ward where two seats were up for election due to the early retirement of Councillor Stuart Newbold. The vote took place alongside the 2011 United Kingdom Alternative Vote referendum and a Cambridgeshire County Council by-election for Arbury ward.

== Results summary ==
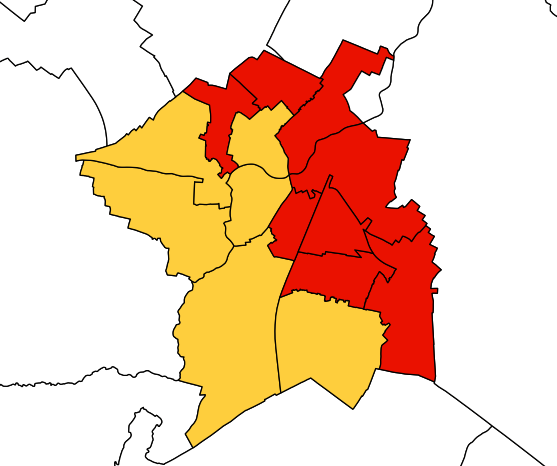
The election result shown geographically.

2011 Cambridge City Council election
Party	This election			Full council			This election		
Party	Seats	Net	Seats %	Other	Total	Total %	Votes	Votes %	+/−
Liberal Democrats	6	▼4	40.0	19	25	59.5	9,844	25.4	-10.0
Labour	9	▲4	60.0	5	14	33.3	13,762	35.5	+12.1
Green	0	Steady	0.0	2	2	4.8	6,045	15.6	-0.9
Independent	0	Steady	0.0	1	1	2.4	138	0.4	N/A
Conservative	0	Steady	0.0	0	0	0.0	8,326	21.5	-1.7
TUSC	0	Steady	0.0	0	0	0.0	455	1.2	+0.1
UKIP	0	Steady	0.0	0	0	0.0	193	0.5	+0.1

This result has the following consequences for the total number of seats on the council after the elections:

Party	Previous council	New council
Liberal Democrats	29	25
Labour	10	14
Green	2	2
Independent	1	1
Conservatives	0	0
Trade Unionist & Socialist	0	0
UKIP	0	0
Total	42	42
Working majority	16	8

The Liberal Democrats retained control of the council, albeit with a reduced majority.

== Ward results ==
Note: in results where, in previous elections, two seats were up for election the party share of the vote is based on an average for those candidates who stood for that particular party in the election.

Changes in party vote is in comparison with the 2010 Cambridge City Council election results.

=== Abbey ward ===
Councillor Caroline Hart was defending her Abbey seat for the Labour Party.

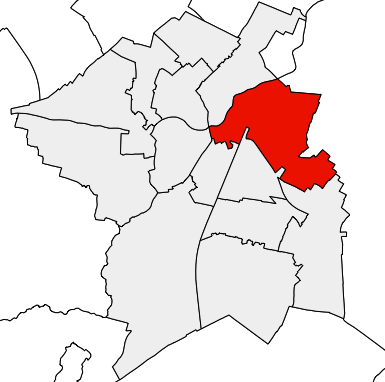
Abbey ward

Cambridge City Council elections 2011: Abbey ward
Party	Candidate	Votes	%	±%
Labour	Caroline Hart	1,057	41.8	+19.0
Green	Brett Hughes	796	31.5	+1.8
Conservative	Craig Thomas	414	16.4	−4.0
Liberal Democrats	Christopher Brown	260	10.3	−16.9
Majority		261	10.3	
Rejected ballots		22		
Turnout		2,527	37.5	
Labour hold		Swing	+8.6	

=== Arbury ward ===
Councillor Alan Levy was defending his Arbury seat for the Liberal Democrats.

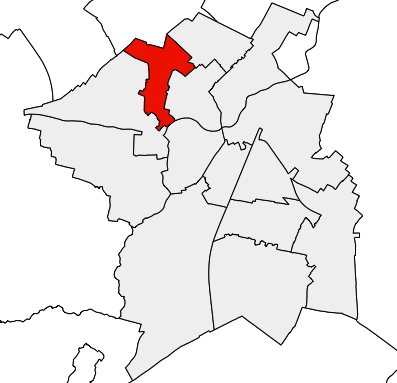
Arbury ward

Cambridge City Council elections 2011: Arbury ward
Party	Candidate	Votes	%	±%
Labour	Carina O'Reilly	1,310	40.5	+13.5
Liberal Democrats	Alan Levy	1,015	31.4	−7.5
Conservative	Ali Meftah	448	13.8	−5.5
Green	Stephen Lawrence	377	11.6	−3.2
UKIP	Albert Watts	87	2.7	+2.7
Majority		295	9.1	
Rejected ballots		35		
Turnout		3,237	47.8	
Labour gain from Liberal Democrats		Swing	+10.5	

=== Castle ward ===
Councillor Tania Zmura retired her seat. Philip Tucker was aiming to retain the vacated seat for the Liberal Democrats.

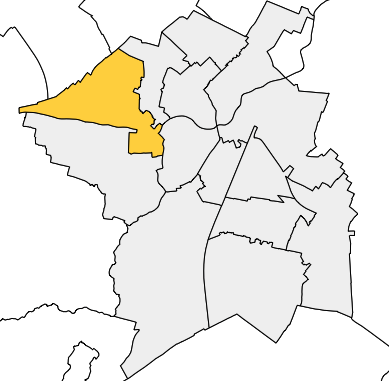
Castle ward

Cambridge City Council elections 2011: Castle ward
Party	Candidate	Votes	%	±%
Liberal Democrats	Philip Tucker	973	33.6	−11.1
Labour	Ashley Walsh	728	25.2	+9.8
Conservative	Philip Salway	620	21.4	−0.4
Green	Jack Toye	572	19.8	+1.8
Majority		254	8.4	
Rejected ballots		67		
Turnout		2,893	43.7	
Liberal Democrats hold		Swing	-10.5	

=== Cherry Hinton ward ===
Due to the retirement of Labour Party Councillor Stuart Newbold, two seats were up for election. Councillor Russ McPherson was defending his seat for the Labour Party.

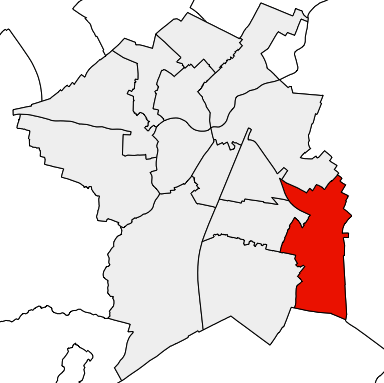
Cherry Hinton ward

Cambridge City Council elections 2011: Cherry Hinton ward (two seats)
Party	Candidate	Votes	%	±%
Labour	Mark Ashton	1,525	51.5	+13.1
Labour	Russ McPherson	1,464	49.4	+11.0
Conservative	Anthony Turnham	880	29.7	+0.3
Conservative	Timothy Haire	865	29.2	−0.2
Green	Jane Esgate	304	10.3	+2.5
Green	Neil Ford	267	9.0	+1.2
Liberal Democrats	Keith Edkins	246	8.3	−16.1
Liberal Democrats	Joe Ryan	205	6.9	−17.5
Majority		584	19.7	
Rejected ballots		19		
Turnout		5,756	45.8	
Labour hold		Swing	+6.5	
Labour hold		Swing	+5.5	

=== Coleridge ward ===
Councillor Jeremy Benstead was defending his Coleridge seat for the Labour Party.

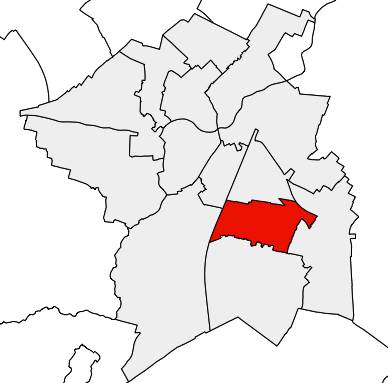
Coleridge ward

Cambridge City Council elections 2011: Coleridge ward
Party	Candidate	Votes	%	±%
Labour	Jeremy Benstead	1,346	46.9	+14.6
Conservative	Andrew Bower	869	30.3	+1.9
Green	Valerie Hopkins	368	12.8	+1.9
Liberal Democrats	Thomas Yates	285	9.9	−15.6
Majority		477	16.6	
Rejected ballots		27		
Turnout		2,868	45.5	
Labour hold		Swing	+6.4	

=== East Chesterton ward ===
Councillor Clare Blair was defending her East Chesterton seat for the Liberal Democrats.

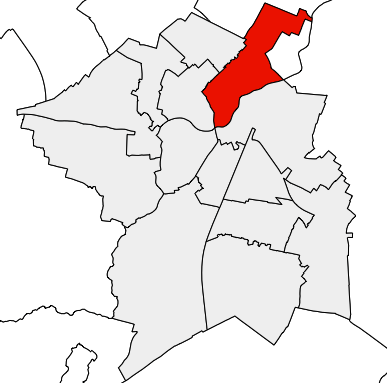
East Chesterton ward

Cambridge City Council elections 2011: East Chesterton ward
Party	Candidate	Votes	%	±%
Labour	Gerri Bird	1,133	38.4	+18.2
Liberal Democrats	Clare Blair	912	30.9	−3.5
Conservative	Kevin Francis	488	16.5	−5.7
Green	Peter Pope	312	10.7	−4.4
UKIP	Peter Burkinshaw	106	3.6	+3.6
Majority		221	7.5	
Rejected ballots		32		
Turnout		2,951	44.7	
Labour gain from Liberal Democrats		Swing	+10.9	

=== King's Hedges ward ===
Councillor Mike Pitt was defending his King's Hedges seat for the Liberal Democrats.

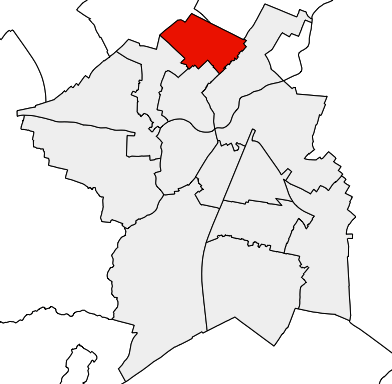
King's Hedges ward

Cambridge City Council elections 2011: King's Hedges ward
Party	Candidate	Votes	%	±%
Labour	Kevin Price	905	40.0	+11.0
Liberal Democrats	Mike Pitt	729	32.3	−4.0
Conservative	Annette Karimi	390	17.3	−6.6
Independent	Ian Tyes	138	6.1	+6.1
TUSC	Martin Booth	99	4.4	+2.1
Majority		175	7.7	
Rejected ballots		21		
Turnout		2,261	36.9	
Labour gain from Liberal Democrats		Swing	+7.5	

=== Market ward ===
Councillor Michael Dixon retired his seat. Andrea Reiner was aiming to retain the vacated seat for the Liberal Democrats.

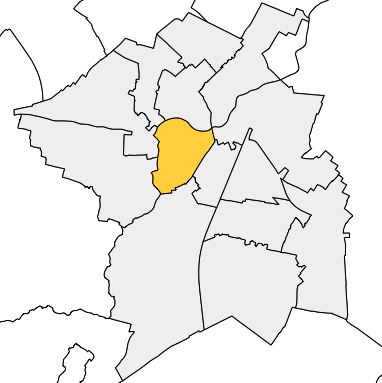
Market ward

Cambridge City Council elections 2011: Market ward
Party	Candidate	Votes	%	±%
Liberal Democrats	Andrea Reiner	754	28.0	−15.0
Labour	Oliver Holbrook	665	24.7	+10.2
Green	Alexandra Collis	651	24.2	+4.4
Conservative	Jeremy Waller	620	23.0	+0.3
Majority		89	3.3	
Rejected ballots		59		
Turnout		2,690	41.5	
Liberal Democrats hold		Swing	-12.6	

=== Newnham ward ===
Councillor Julie Smith was defending her Newnham seat for the Liberal Democrats.

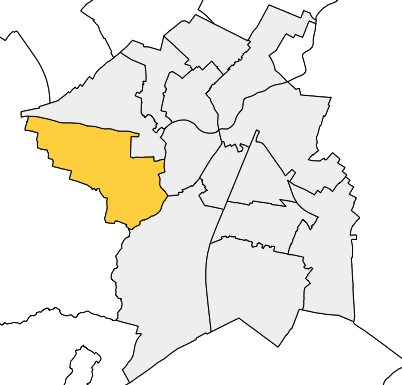
Newnham ward

Cambridge City Council elections 2011: Newnham ward
Party	Candidate	Votes	%	±%
Liberal Democrats	Julie Smith	990	35.2	−9.7
Labour	Richard Johnson	756	26.9	+11.3
Conservative	Joanna Anscombe-Bell	621	22.1	−1.9
Green	James Youd	443	15.8	+0.3
Majority		234	8.3	
Rejected ballots		52		
Turnout		2,810	43.2	
Liberal Democrats hold		Swing	-10.5	

=== Petersfield ward ===
Councillor Lucy Walker retired her Petersfield seat. Kevin Blencowe was aiming to retain the vacated seat for the Labour Party.

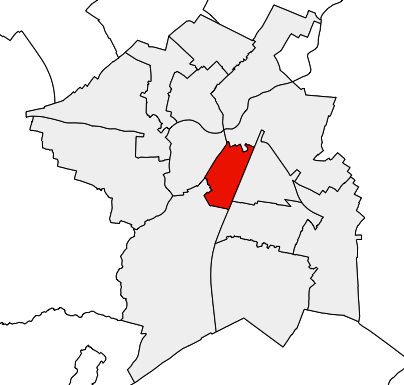
Petersfield ward

Cambridge City Council elections 2011: Petersfield ward
Party	Candidate	Votes	%	±%
Labour	Kevin Blencowe	1,353	48.9	+21.2
Liberal Democrats	Zoe O'Connell	594	21.5	−11.9
Green	Shayne Mitchell	481	17.4	−2.1
Conservative	Shapour Meftah	340	12.3	−1.4
Majority		759	27.4	
Rejected ballots		25		
Turnout		2,768	49.9	
Labour hold		Swing	+16.6	

=== Queen Edith's ward ===
Councillor Viki Sanders retired her Queen Edith's seat. George Pippas was aiming to retain the vacated seat for the Liberal Democrats.

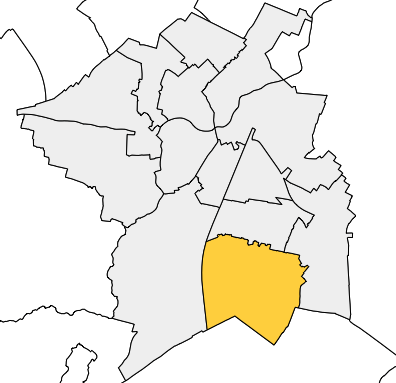
Queen Edith's ward

Cambridge City Council elections 2011: Queen Edith's ward
Party	Candidate	Votes	%	±%
Liberal Democrats	George Pippas	1,318	41.1	−7.9
Conservative	Vince Marino	830	25.9	−2.2
Labour	Sue Birtles	642	20.0	+7.6
Green	Brian Westcott	416	13.0	+5.3
Majority		488	15.2	
Rejected ballots		24		
Turnout		3,206	49.9	
Liberal Democrats hold		Swing	-2.8	

=== Romsey ward ===
Councillor Raj Shah was defending his Romsey seat for the Liberal Democrats.

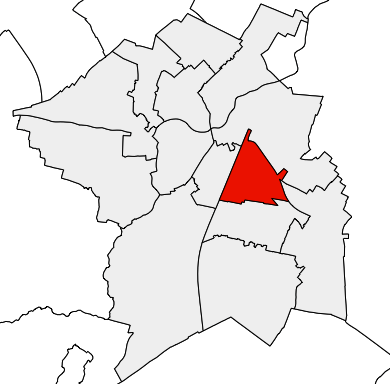
Romsey ward

Cambridge City Council elections 2011: Romsey ward
Party	Candidate	Votes	%	±%
Labour	Zoe Moghadas	996	33.3	+11.4
Liberal Democrats	Raj Shah	870	29.1	−9.0
Green	Jamie Gibson	411	13.7	−2.7
Conservative	Sam Barker	360	12.0	−2.1
TUSC	Tom Woodcock	356	11.9	+2.4
Majority		126	4.2	
Rejected ballots		18		
Turnout		2,993	46.0	
Labour gain from Liberal Democrats		Swing	+10.2	

=== Trumpington ward ===
Councillor Andy Blackhurst was defending his Trumpington seat for the Liberal Democrats.

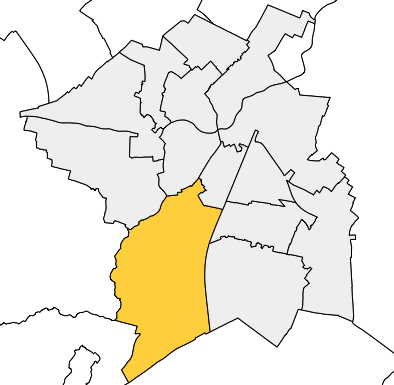
Trumpington ward

Cambridge City Council elections 2011: Trumpington ward
Party	Candidate	Votes	%	±%
Liberal Democrats	Andy Blackhurst	991	36.1	−7.1
Conservative	John Ionides	869	31.7	+0.4
Labour	Kenny Latunde-Dada	481	17.5	+3.3
Green	Ceri Galloway	401	14.6	+3.3
Majority		122	4.4	
Rejected ballots		24		
Turnout		2,742	40.6	
Liberal Democrats hold		Swing	-3.8	

=== West Chesterton ward ===
Councillor Damien Tunnacliffe was defending his West Chesterton seat for the Liberal Democrats.

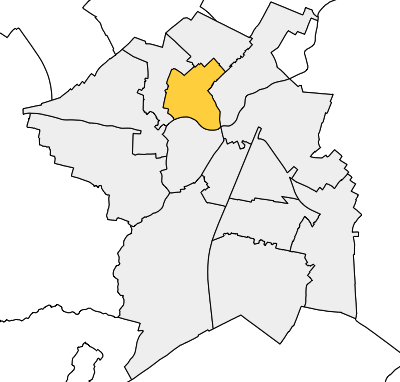
West Chesterton ward

Cambridge City Council elections 2011: West Chesterton ward
Party	Candidate	Votes	%	±%
Liberal Democrats	Damien Tunnacliffe	1,225	38.5	−1.1
Labour	Mike Sargeant	866	27.2	+7.8
Conservative	Robert Yeatman	577	18.1	+2.0
Green	Stephen Lintott	513	16.1	−5.5
Majority		359	11.3	
Rejected ballots		27		
Turnout		3,181	52.3	
Liberal Democrats hold		Swing	-4.5	

== Cambridgeshire County Council by-election for Arbury division ==
=== Arbury division ===
Following the retirement of County Councillor Rupert Moss-Eccardt, the Cambridgeshire County Council seat for Arbury was vacant. Amy Ellis was aiming to retain the seat for the Liberal Democrats.

Cambridgeshire City Council by-election 2011: Arbury division
Party	Candidate	Votes	%	±%
Labour	Paul Sales	1,214	37.5	+8.9
Liberal Democrats	Amy Ellis	1,078	33.7	−8.3
Conservative	Shapour Meftah	496	15.5	−0.3
Green	Martin Bonner	411	12.8	−0.4
Majority		136	3.8	N/A
Rejected ballots		35		
Turnout		3,199	47.2	
Labour gain from Liberal Democrats		Swing	+8.6	

== Alternative Vote referendum result for Cambridge ==
Cambridge was one of the few areas of the country that voted "yes" for the Alternative Vote in the referendum held on 5 May 2011. The result was as follows:

United Kingdom Alternative Vote referendum, 2011 – Cambridge result
Choice	Votes	%
For	21,253	52.97
Against	18,871	47.03
Total	40,124	100.00
Valid votes	39,124	99.40
Invalid/blank votes	236	0.60
Total votes	39,360	100.00
Registered voters/turnout	81,273	48.43
