= 2003 Cambridge City Council election =

Cambridge City Council election

Map of the results

The 2003 Cambridge City Council election took place on 1 May 2003 to elect members of Cambridge City Council in England. This was on the same day as other nationwide local elections.

== Results summary ==
2003 Cambridge City Council election
Party	This election			Full council			This election		
Party	Seats	Net	Seats %	Other	Total	Total %	Votes	Votes %	+/−
Liberal Democrats	11	▲2	64.7	14	25	59.5	12,896	41.2	+0.6
Labour	6	▼2	35.3	9	15	35.7	8,183	26.1	-3.0
Conservative	0	Steady	0.0	2	2	4.8	7,366	23.5	+2.2
Green	0	Steady	0.0	0	0	0.0	2,491	8.0	+0.7
UKIP	0	Steady	0.0	0	0	0.0	243	0.8	±0.0
Socialist Alliance	0	Steady	0.0	0	0	0.0	137	0.4	-0.1

== Ward results ==
=== Abbey ===
Abbey
Party	Candidate	Votes	%	±%
Labour	John Durrant	502	55.2	−3.4
Conservative	Vivian Ellis	195	21.4	+2.9
Liberal Democrats	Thomas Yates	142	15.6	+4.0
Green	John Collins	71	7.8	+1.6
Majority		307	33.7	−6.4
Turnout		910	19.2	−1.4
Labour hold		Swing	▼3.2	

=== Arbury ===
Arbury
Party	Candidate	Votes	%	±%
Liberal Democrats	Rhodri James	739	36.4	+7.7
Labour	Ian Kidman	689	33.9	−7.1
Conservative	Robert Boorman	535	26.3	+0.9
Green	Peter Pope	70	3.4	−0.2
Majority		50	2.5	—
Turnout		2,033	39.8	±0.0
Liberal Democrats hold		Swing	▲7.4	

=== Castle ===
Castle
Party	Candidate	Votes	%	±%
Liberal Democrats	David Howarth	1,226	58.2	+6.8
Conservative	Rhona Boorman	445	21.1	+0.1
Labour	Gillian Richardson	271	12.9	−6.0
Green	Stephen Lawrence	163	7.7	−0.9
Majority		781	37.1	+6.7
Turnout		2,105	30.1	−0.9
Liberal Democrats hold		Swing	▲3.4	

=== Cherry Hinton ===
Cherry Hinton
Party	Candidate	Votes	%	±%
Labour	Robert Dryden	1,072	43.3	+3.5
Conservative	Justin Hinchcliffe	1,021	41.2	−8.1
Liberal Democrats	Geoffrey Heathcock	311	12.6	+4.4
Green	Shayne Mitchell	73	2.9	+0.2
Majority		51	2.1	—
Turnout		2,477	45.8	+1.7
Labour hold		Swing	▲5.8	

=== Coleridge ===
Coleridge
Party	Candidate	Votes	%	±%
Labour	Berni Callaghan	742	41.1	−9.5
Conservative	Martin Hall	571	31.6	+7.1
Liberal Democrats	Laura Doherty	254	14.1	−0.3
Green	Richard Rippin	95	5.3	+0.2
Socialist Alliance	Simon Sedgwick-Jell	74	4.1	+1.6
UKIP	Albert Watts	70	3.9	+1.0
Majority		171	9.5	−16.6
Turnout		1,806	31.1	−0.6
Labour hold		Swing	▼8.3	

=== East Chesterton ===
East Chesterton
Party	Candidate	Votes	%	±%
Liberal Democrats	Donald Adey	912	40.8	+0.3
Labour	Patricia Johnston	756	33.8	−1.9
Conservative	Mamunur Rashid	332	14.8	+1.5
Green	Neil Hewett	157	7.0	+1.6
UKIP	Marjorie Barr	79	3.5	−1.7
Majority		156	7.0	+2.2
Turnout		2,236	31.6	−2.3
Liberal Democrats gain from Labour		Swing	▲1.1	

=== King's Hedges ===
King's Hedges (2 seats due to by-election)
Party	Candidate	Votes	%
Labour	Elizabeth Hughes	473	50.1
Labour	Louise Downham	438	46.3
Conservative	Hugh Mennie	214	22.6
Conservative	Cyril Weinman	202	21.4
Liberal Democrats	Evelyn Bradford	182	19.3
Liberal Democrats	Jonathan Monroe	129	13.7
Green	Gerhard Goldbeck-Wood	95	10.1
Turnout		945	19.7
Labour hold			
Labour hold			

=== Market ===
Market
Party	Candidate	Votes	%	±%
Liberal Democrats	Michael Dixon	817	56.7	−0.3
Conservative	James Orpin	240	16.7	+1.2
Green	Martin Lucas-Smith	213	14.8	+2.7
Labour	Paul Sales	171	11.9	−3.5
Majority		577	40.0	−1.5
Turnout		1,441	21.6	−1.1
Liberal Democrats hold		Swing	▼0.8	

=== Newnham ===
Newnham
Party	Candidate	Votes	%	±%
Liberal Democrats	Julie Smith	987	54.3	−1.2
Conservative	Laurence Tailby	334	18.4	+2.5
Labour	Miriam Lynn	257	14.1	−4.1
Green	Anna Gomori-Woodcock	239	13.2	+3.9
Majority		653	35.9	−1.4
Turnout		1,817	23.6	−3.0
Liberal Democrats hold		Swing	▼1.9	

=== Petersfield ===
Petersfield
Party	Candidate	Votes	%	±%
Labour	Patricia Wright	738	35.9	−4.5
Liberal Democrats	Kevin Wilkins	604	29.3	+5.0
Green	Margaret Wright	481	23.4	+1.9
Conservative	Daniel Whant	235	11.4	+0.6
Majority		134	6.5	−9.6
Turnout		2,058	26.5	−4.1
Labour hold		Swing	▼4.8	

=== Queen Edith's ===
Queen Edith's
Party	Candidate	Votes	%	±%
Liberal Democrats	Alan Baker	1,497	63.8	+4.0
Conservative	Keith Henry	395	16.8	−1.2
Labour	Susan Rosser	242	10.3	−2.8
Green	Robert Milsom	119	5.1	−1.0
UKIP	Helene Davies	94	4.0	+1.0
Majority		1,102	47.0	—
Turnout		2,347	38.7	−2.7
Liberal Democrats hold		Swing	▲2.6	

=== Romsey ===
Romsey
Party	Candidate	Votes	%	±%
Liberal Democrats	Iain Coleman	892	43.8	−1.0
Labour	Paul Gilchrist	789	38.8	−1.3
Green	Vicky Russell	146	7.2	−1.8
Conservative	Richard Normington	145	7.1	+1.0
Socialist Alliance	Diana Minns	63	3.1	N/A
Majority		103	5.0	+0.3
Turnout		2,035	34.0	−1.9
Liberal Democrats gain from Labour		Swing	▲0.2	

=== Trumpington ===
Trumpington (2 seats due to by-election)
Party	Candidate	Votes	%
Liberal Democrats	Philippa Slatter	1,225	50.4
Liberal Democrats	Edrich Adigun-Harris	1,126	46.3
Conservative	Hannah Towns	949	39.0
Conservative	Steven George	914	37.6
Green	Neil Ford	181	7.4
Labour	David Coulson	150	6.2
Labour	Jonathan Goodacre	135	5.6
Turnout		2,432	40.4
Liberal Democrats hold			
Liberal Democrats hold			

=== West Chesterton ===
West Chesterton
Party	Candidate	Votes	%
Liberal Democrats	Max Boyce	941	50.2
Liberal Democrats	Nichola Harrison	912	48.6
Labour	Mick Brown	390	20.8
Labour	Michael Sargeant	368	19.6
Conservative	James Strachan	341	18.2
Conservative	Graham Palmer	298	15.9
Green	Sarah Peake	233	12.4
Green	Stephen Peake	155	8.3
Turnout		1,875	30.9
Liberal Democrats hold			
Liberal Democrats hold			
