= 1982 Cambridge City Council election =

1982 English local election

← 1980	6 May 1982	1983 →

14 out of 42 seats to Cambridge City Council 22 seats needed for a majority
- Turnout: 46.7% (▲4.9%)

	First party	Second party	Third party
Party	Labour	Conservative	Alliance
Last election	21 seats, 42.8%	16 seats, 38.3%	4 seats, 18.4%
Seats won	7	4	3
Seats after	20	14	8
Seat change	▲1	▼2	▲2
Popular vote	12,286	12,617	12,022
Percentage	33.1%	34.0%	32.4%
Swing	▼9.7%	▼4.3%	▲14.0%
- Winner of each seat at the 1982 Cambridge City Council election
Council control before election
No overall control
Council control after election
No overall control

The 1982 Cambridge City Council election took place on 6 May 1982 to elect members of Cambridge City Council in Cambridge, Cambridgeshire, England. This was on the same day as other local elections across England.

== Summary ==
=== Election result ===
1982 Cambridge City Council election
Party	This election			Full council			This election		
Party	Seats	Net	Seats %	Other	Total	Total %	Votes	Votes %	+/−
Labour	7	▲1	50.0	13	20	47.6	12,286	33.1	–9.7
Conservative	4	▼2	28.6	10	14	33.3	12,617	34.0	–4.3
Alliance	3	▲2	21.4	5	8	19.0	12,022	32.4	+14.0
Independent	0	▼1	0.0	0	0	0.0	148	0.4	N/A
Workers Revolutionary	0	Steady	0.0	0	0	0.0	25	0.1	N/A

== Ward results ==
=== Abbey ===
Abbey
Party	Candidate	Votes	%	±%
Labour	Carey Widdows	1,169	59.2	–12.4
SDP (Alliance)	Else Meyland-Smith	435	22.0	+15.9
Conservative	Sally-Anne Worland	372	18.8	–3.6
Majority		734	37.1	–12.1
Turnout		1,976	40.6	+6.1
Registered electors		4,673		
Labour hold		Swing	▼14.2	

=== Arbury ===
Arbury
Party	Candidate	Votes	%	±%
Labour	Stephen Watts	1,058	39.2	–13.4
Conservative	Stephen George	854	31.7	–6.5
SDP (Alliance)	Philip Laidlaw	785	29.1	+19.9
Majority		204	7.6	–6.9
Turnout		2,697	50.3	+6.1
Registered electors		5,364		
Labour hold		Swing	▼3.5	

=== Castle ===
Castle
Party	Candidate	Votes	%	±%
Liberal (Alliance)	Andrew Duff	1,300	46.3	+2.8
Conservative	George Reid*	1,067	38.0	+1.1
Labour	Richard Newbury	440	15.7	–3.9
Majority		233	8.3	+1.6
Turnout		2,807	48.9	+3.7
Registered electors		5,735		
Liberal gain from Conservative		Swing	▲0.9	

=== Cherry Hinton ===
Cherry Hinton
Party	Candidate	Votes	%	±%
Labour	Adrian Herbert	1,123	38.9	–13.7
Conservative	Allen Alderson	952	33.0	–7.3
SDP (Alliance)	Margaret Reiss*	809	28.1	+21.0
Majority		171	5.9	–6.4
Turnout		2,884	55.0	+4.7
Registered electors		5,248		
Labour gain from Conservative		Swing	▼3.2	

=== Coleridge ===
Coleridge
Party	Candidate	Votes	%	±%
Conservative	Charles Seagrave*	1,127	41.3	+1.8
Labour	Eleanor Fairclough	1,003	36.8	–12.2
Liberal (Alliance)	Stephen Hunter	598	21.9	+10.4
Majority		124	4.5	N/A
Turnout		2,728	51.1	+2.5
Registered electors		5,337		
Conservative hold		Swing	▲7.0	

=== East Chesterton ===
East Chesterton
Party	Candidate	Votes	%	±%
Conservative	Sidney Miller*	1,257	40.8	–4.9
Labour	Jonathan Hardy	952	30.9	–14.6
SDP (Alliance)	Stephen Marshall	874	28.3	+19.6
Majority		305	9.9	+9.7
Turnout		3,083	50.5	+5.8
Registered electors		6,102		
Conservative hold		Swing	▲4.9	

=== Kings Hedges ===
Kings Hedges
Party	Candidate	Votes	%	±%
Labour	Raith Overhill	811	48.0	–22.6
Liberal (Alliance)	Tristram Riley-Smith	374	22.1	+14.1
Conservative	William Sale	358	21.2	–0.2
Independent	Philip Geoghan*	148	8.8	N/A
Majority		437	25.8	–23.4
Turnout		1,691	33.3	–3.2
Registered electors		5,084		
Labour hold		Swing	▼18.4	

=== Market ===
Market
Party	Candidate	Votes	%	±%
Liberal (Alliance)	Joye Rosenstiel	1,092	47.5	–3.3
Conservative	Michael O'Hannah	626	27.2	–0.6
Labour	Anthony Carter	580	25.2	+3.8
Majority		466	20.3	–2.8
Turnout		2,298	38.6	+5.1
Registered electors		5,961		
Liberal gain from Independent		Swing	▼1.4	

=== Newnham ===
Newnham
Party	Candidate	Votes	%	±%
Labour	Violet Crane	1,028	36.4	–11.5
Conservative	David Bard	937	33.2	–0.4
SDP (Alliance)	Terence Moore	857	30.4	+12.0
Majority		91	3.2	–11.1
Turnout		2,822	40.0	+2.4
Registered electors		7,054		
Labour hold		Swing	▼5.6	

=== Petersfield ===
Petersfield
Party	Candidate	Votes	%	±%
Labour	Frank Gawthrop*	1,560	52.7	–0.2
SDP (Alliance)	David Pearl	730	24.7	+16.0
Conservative	Matthew Butler	671	22.7	–10.4
Majority		830	28.0	+8.2
Turnout		2,691	51.4	+4.9
Registered electors		5,758		
Labour hold		Swing	▼8.1	

=== Queens Edith ===
Queens Edith
Party	Candidate	Votes	%	±%
Conservative	James Johnson*	1,486	44.9	–1.1
Liberal (Alliance)	Lesbia Bradford	1,317	39.8	+5.4
Labour	Richard Robinson	507	15.3	–4.3
Majority		169	5.1	–6.6
Turnout		3,310	56.3	+6.2
Registered electors		5,883		
Conservative hold		Swing	▼3.3	

=== Romsey ===
Romsey
Party	Candidate	Votes	%	±%
Labour	Terence Sweeney*	1,189	45.8	–13.5
Liberal (Alliance)	Richard Folley	1,007	38.8	+25.2
Conservative	Anthony Hay	376	14.5	–12.5
Workers Revolutionary	Martin Booth	25	1.0	N/A
Majority		182	7.0	–25.3
Turnout		2,597	46.4	+10.0
Registered electors		5,601		
Labour hold		Swing	▼19.4	

=== Trumpington ===
Trumpington
Party	Candidate	Votes	%	±%
Conservative	Millicent Suckling*	1,409	55.6	–0.9
SDP (Alliance)	Kevin Robinson	718	28.4	+12.5
Labour	Stephen Pugh	405	16.0	–11.6
Majority		691	27.3	–1.7
Turnout		2,532	44.1	+5.0
Registered electors		5,743		
Conservative hold		Swing	▼6.7	

=== West Chesterton ===
West Chesterton
Party	Candidate	Votes	%	±%
Liberal (Alliance)	Mark Hayes	1,126	41.5	+26.9
Conservative	Chris Gough-Goodman*	1,125	41.5	–16.4
Labour	Anil Sinha	461	17.0	–10.4
Majority		1	0.1	N/A
Turnout		2,712	51.0	+14.0
Registered electors		5,314		
Liberal gain from Conservative		Swing	▲21.7	
