= Salah Al Bandar =

British citizen of Sudanese origin

Dr Salah Al Bander (also Al Bandar, born 1955) is a British citizen of Sudanese origin known for his role in revealing the Bandargate scandal in Bahrain. Al Bander had been working as a strategic planning adviser to the Royal Court of Bahrain since January 2002, then he was seconded to Ministry of Cabinet Affairs in January 2006. On 13 September 2006 he was arrested and deported to London by Bahraini security officials after he distributed a report revealing a conspiracy to suppress the Shia in Bahrain (who form the majority of the population). The scandal that ensued was named Bandargate, after him. Al Bander is also the Secretary General of the MOWATIN: Gulf Centre for Democratic Development, a London-registered non-governmental organisation.

== UK politics ==
He served as a city councillor in Cambridge for the Liberal Democrats from 2008-2012. He left the Liberal Democrats in 2015.

== See also ==
- Bandargate scandal
- Politics of Bahrain
- Whistleblower
