= 1976 Cambridge City Council election =

1976 English local election

← 1973	6 May 1976	1978 →

All 42 seats to Cambridge City Council 22 seats needed for a majority
- Turnout: 42.3%

	First party	Second party	Third party
Party	Conservative	Labour	Liberal
Seats won	24	16	2
Seat change	▲13	▼10	▼3
Popular vote	42,350	33,020	7,646
Percentage	50.2%	39.2%	9.1%
Council control before election
Labour
Council control after election
Conservative

The 1976 Cambridge City Council election took place on 6 May 1976 to elect members of Cambridge City Council in Cambridge, Cambridgeshire, England. This was on the same day as other local elections across England.

The whole council was up for election on new ward boundaries, with fourteen 3-seat wards being contested at this election. Labour lost control of the council to the Conservatives.

== Summary ==
=== Election result ===
1976 Cambridge City Council election
Party	Candidates	Seats	Gains	Losses	Net gain/loss	Seats %	Votes %	Votes	+/−
Conservative	36	24	N/A	N/A	▲13	57.1	50.2	42,350	
Labour	38	16	N/A	N/A	▼10	38.1	39.2	33,020	
Liberal	15	2	N/A	N/A	▼3	4.8	9.1	7,646	
Independent Liberal	1	0	N/A	N/A	Steady	0.0	0.6	520	
Ind. Labour Party	1	0	N/A	N/A	Steady	0.0	0.5	460	
Communist	1	0	N/A	N/A	Steady	0.0	0.4	306	

== Ward results ==
=== Abbey ===
Abbey (3 seats)
Party	Candidate	Votes	%
Labour	P. Warren	763	54.3
Labour	D. Howe	671	47.8
Labour	A. Molt	627	44.6
Conservative	E. Jones	530	37.7
Independent	P. Allen	168	12.0
Turnout		1,405	31.6
Registered electors		4,446	
Labour win (new seat)			
Labour win (new seat)			
Labour win (new seat)			

=== Arbury ===
Arbury (3 seats)
Party	Candidate	Votes	%
Labour	E. Gard	1,160	47.3
Labour	M. Rooney	1,127	45.9
Labour	A. Pettifor	1,118	45.6
Conservative	O. Green	1,093	44.6
Conservative	S. Tyrrell	1,089	44.4
Conservative	J. Newman	1,084	44.2
Turnout		2,453	45.4
Registered electors		5,402	
Labour win (new seat)			
Labour win (new seat)			
Labour win (new seat)			

=== Castle ===
Castle (3 seats)
Party	Candidate	Votes	%
Conservative	N. Auker	1,550	58.0
Conservative	J. Powley	1,487	55.7
Conservative	G. Reid	1,449	54.2
Labour	M. Mackie	1,000	37.4
Labour	M. Wilson	987	37.0
Labour	J. Schicker	976	36.5
Turnout		2,671	44.8
Registered electors		5,962	
Conservative win (new seat)			
Conservative win (new seat)			
Conservative win (new seat)			

=== Cherry Hinton ===
Cherry Hinton (3 seats)
Party	Candidate	Votes	%
Conservative	J. Phillips	1,192	51.4
Conservative	J. West	1,086	46.8
Conservative	G. Coteman	1,017	43.8
Labour	P. Holmes	965	41.6
Labour	J. Hughes	932	40.2
Labour	S. Dartford	889	38.3
Turnout		2,321	45.7
Registered electors		5,078	
Conservative win (new seat)			
Conservative win (new seat)			
Conservative win (new seat)			

=== Coleridge ===
Coleridge (3 seats)
Party	Candidate	Votes	%
Conservative	D. Mackay	1,067	44.3
Conservative	F. Burling	1,044	43.3
Conservative	D. Anderson	996	41.3
Labour	H. Percival	905	37.6
Labour	J. Curley	819	34.0
Labour	O. Nicol	808	33.5
Liberal	A. Hill	329	13.7
Liberal	L. Edkins	288	12.0
Liberal	C. Townsend	269	11.2
Turnout		2,410	47.3
Registered electors		5,096	
Conservative win (new seat)			
Conservative win (new seat)			
Conservative win (new seat)			

=== East Chesterton ===
East Chesterton
Party	Candidate	Votes	%
Conservative	G. Knowles	1,342	55.0
Conservative	S. Reid	1,323	54.2
Conservative	S. Miller	1,279	52.4
Labour	R. Overhill	964	39.5
Labour	L. Freeman	960	39.3
Labour	A. Carter	904	37.0
Turnout		2,441	39.3
Registered electors		6,210	
Conservative win (new seat)			
Conservative win (new seat)			
Conservative win (new seat)			

=== Kings Hedges ===
Kings Hedges
Party	Candidate	Votes	%
Labour	P. Cowell	772	41.5
Labour	C. Kaldor	688	37.0
Labour	P. Geoghan	627	33.7
Conservative	D. Parmenter	580	31.2
Turnout		1,859	47.4
Registered electors		3,922	
Labour win (new seat)			
Labour win (new seat)			
Labour win (new seat)			

=== Market ===
Market (3 seats)
Party	Candidate	Votes	%
Liberal	C. Rosenstiel	839	35.3
Liberal	L. Hawes	807	33.9
Conservative	G. Edwards	790	33.2
Conservative	M. O'Hannan	783	32.9
Conservative	K. Price	776	32.6
Liberal	B. Greaves	764	32.1
Labour	D. Bleiman	725	30.5
Independent Liberal	S. Foott	520	21.9
Communist	P. Berry	306	12.9
Turnout		2,379	38.7
Registered electors		6,148	
Liberal win (new seat)			
Liberal win (new seat)			
Conservative win (new seat)			

=== Newnham ===
Newnham (3 seats)
Party	Candidate	Votes	%
Labour	G. Lipstein	1,306	43.4
Labour	R. Cohen	1,221	40.6
Labour	R. Edwards	1,218	40.5
Conservative	B. Cooper	1,172	38.9
Conservative	J. Shaw	1,110	36.9
Conservative	P. Robinson	1,106	36.7
Liberal	A. Gore	598	19.9
Liberal	J. Cummins	590	19.6
Liberal	D. Grace	550	18.3
Turnout		3,011	44.8
Registered electors		6,720	
Labour win (new seat)			
Labour win (new seat)			
Labour win (new seat)			

=== Petersfield ===
Petersfield (3 seats)
Party	Candidate	Votes	%
Conservative	E. Seargeant	1,018	44.6
Labour	R. Thornely	1,013	44.4
Conservative	E. Wheatley	966	42.4
Labour	D. Mackie	961	42.1
Conservative	B. Wright	948	41.6
Labour	S. Trotman	936	41.1
Ind. Labour Party	R. Beveridge	460	20.2
Turnout		2,280	37.9
Registered electors		6,016	
Conservative win (new seat)			
Labour win (new seat)			
Conservative win (new seat)			

=== Queen Ediths ===
Queen Ediths (3 seats)
Party	Candidate	Votes	%
Conservative	E. Hodder	1,677	58.9
Conservative	S. Dolby	1,577	55.4
Conservative	J. Johnson	1,568	55.1
Labour	P. Harper	620	21.8
Labour	G. Rowling	619	21.7
Labour	E. Shepherd	615	21.6
Liberal	J. Fitch	597	21.0
Liberal	A. Corsellis	441	15.5
Liberal	S. Weeds	380	13.3
Turnout		2,847	46.9
Registered electors		6,071	
Conservative win (new seat)			
Conservative win (new seat)			
Conservative win (new seat)			

=== Romsey ===
Romsey (3 seats)
Party	Candidate	Votes	%
Labour	P. Wright	971	47.2
Labour	R. May	879	42.7
Labour	T. Sweeney	860	41.8
Conservative	C. Barker	707	34.4
Liberal	A. Charlesworth	469	22.8
Liberal	J. Steward	369	17.9
Liberal	J. Minton	356	17.3
Turnout		2,058	36.2
Registered electors		5,686	
Labour win (new seat)			
Labour win (new seat)			
Labour win (new seat)			

=== Trumpington ===
Trumpington (3 seats)
Party	Candidate	Votes	%
Conservative	R. Wright	1,511	73.4
Conservative	B. Harrison	1,453	70.6
Conservative	M. Suckling	1,447	70.3
Labour	S. Richer	737	35.8
Turnout		2,505	44.2
Registered electors		5,667	
Conservative win (new seat)			
Conservative win (new seat)			
Conservative win (new seat)			

=== West Chesterton ===
West Chesterton
Party	Candidate	Votes	%
Conservative	M. Garner	1,578	71.2
Conservative	P. Reed	1,494	67.4
Conservative	C. Gough-Goodman	1,461	65.9
Labour	J. Hunt	596	26.9
Labour	H. Nightingale	562	25.4
Labour	A. Lehmann	519	23.4
Turnout		2,216	41.6
Registered electors		5,327	
Conservative win (new seat)			
Conservative win (new seat)			
Conservative win (new seat)			
