= 2014 Cambridge City Council election =

2014 UK local government election

- 22 May 2014

16: one-third of 42 22 seats needed for a majority

	First party	Second party
Party	Labour	Liberal Democrats
Seat change	▲	▼
Swing	▼	▲
	Third party	Fourth party
Party	Independent	Green
Seats won	0	0
Seat change	▲	Steady
Swing	▼	▲
- Winner of each seat at the 2014 Cambridge City Council election

The 2014 Cambridge City Council election took place on 22 May 2014 to elect members of Cambridge City Council in England. This was on the same day as other local elections and the European Union elections.

== Results summary ==
2014 Cambridge City Council election
Party	This election			Full council			This election		
Party	Seats	Net	Seats %	Other	Total	Total %	Votes	Votes %	+/−
Labour	10	▲6	66.7	15	25	59.5	16,025	40.8	-1.9
Liberal Democrats	4	▼7	26.7	10	14	33.3	11,619	29.6	+3.5
Independent	1	▲1	6.7	1	2	4.8	826	2.1	-1.1
Conservative	0	Steady	0.0	1	1	2.4	5,218	13.3	-2.1
Green	0	Steady	0.0	0	0	0.0	5,271	13.4	+3.3
UKIP	0	Steady	0.0	0	0	0.0	328	0.8	+0.4

== Ward results ==
=== Abbey ===
Abbey
Party	Candidate	Votes	%	±%
Labour	Peter Roberts	1,130	48.7	−5.7
Green	Oscar Gillespie	480	20.7	−3.2
Liberal Democrats	Marcus Streets	384	16.4	+7.1
Conservative	Eric Berrett-Payton	328	14.1	+1.7
Majority				
Turnout				
Labour hold		Swing		

This seat was gained by the Labour Party in a by-election in 2013 and is therefore shown as a hold.

=== Arbury ===
Arbury
Party	Candidate	Votes	%	±%
Labour	Charlotte Perry	1,300	45.6	−14.3
Liberal Democrats	Tim Ward	722	25.3	+6.4
Green	Stephen Lawrence	444	15.6	+5.1
Conservative	James Mottram	385	13.5	+3.0
Majority				
Turnout				
Labour gain from Liberal Democrats		Swing		

=== Castle ===
Castle
Party	Candidate	Votes	%	±%
Independent	Marie-Louise Holland	737	27.2	−22.3
Liberal Democrats	Fergus Blair	717	26.5	+11.8
Labour	Mark Reader	565	20.9	+3.2
Green	Sandra Billington	409	15.1	+6.3
Conservative	Tom Byrne	281	10.4	+1.1
Majority				
Turnout				
Independent gain from Liberal Democrats		Swing		

=== Cherry Hinton ===
Cherry Hinton
Party	Candidate	Votes	%	±%
Labour	Russ McPherson	1,533	60.6	−12.6
Conservative	Timothy Haire	613	24.2	+6.1
Liberal Democrats	Keith Edkins	383	15.1	+6.4
Majority				
Turnout				
Labour hold		Swing		

=== Coleridge ===
Coleridge
Party	Candidate	Votes	%	±%
Labour Co-op	Lewis Herbert	1,326	51.6	−8.0
Conservative	Samuel Barker	430	16.7	−3.8
Liberal Democrats	Donald Adey	368	15.0	+6.1
Green	Shaun Esgate	358	13.9	+2.8
Independent	Puffles The Dragon Fairy	89	3.5	+3.5
Majority				
Turnout				
Labour Co-op hold		Swing		

=== East Chesterton ===
East Chesterton
Party	Candidate	Votes	%	±%
Labour Co-op	Peter Sarris	1,076	35.5	−11.9
Liberal Democrats	Zoe O'Connell	1,066	35.2	+14.7
UKIP	Pater Burkinshaw	328	10.8	+4.8
Green	Peter Pope	299	9.9	−1.4
Conservative	Daniel John	260	8.6	−6.2
Majority				
Turnout				
Labour Co-op gain from Liberal Democrats		Swing		

=== King's Hedges ===
King's Hedges
Party	Candidate	Votes	%	±%
Labour	Martin Smart	831	41.2	−7.2
Liberal Democrats	Neale Upstone	393	19.5	−14.2
Independent	Ian Tyes	287	14.2	+14.2
Conservative	Anette Karimi	266	13.2	+1.5
Green	Michael Potter	242	12.0	+12.0
Majority				
Turnout				
Labour gain from Liberal Democrats		Swing		

=== Market ===
Market
Party	Candidate	Votes	%	±%
Labour	Dan Ratcliffe	903	32.2	+2.9
Green	Maximillian Fries	721	25.7	+5.5
Liberal Democrats	Colin Rosenstiel	678	24.2	−11.4
Conservative	Alex Boyd	500	17.8	+2.9
Majority				
Turnout				
Labour gain from Liberal Democrats		Swing		

=== Newnham ===
Newnham
Party	Candidate	Votes	%	±%
Liberal Democrats	Rod Cantrill	1,056	35.6	−8.9
Labour	Sam Wolfe	987	33.3	+2.2
Green	Julia Harrison	526	17.8	+6.1
Conservative	Joanna Anscombe-Bell	395	13.3	+0.5
Majority				
Turnout		2,964		
Liberal Democrats hold		Swing		

=== Petersfield ===
Petersfield
Party	Candidate	Votes	%	±%
Labour	Ann Sinnott	1,280	27.1	
Labour	Richard Robertson	1,223	25.9	
Liberal Democrats	Sarah Brown	720	15.3	
Green	Matthew Hodgkinson	688	14.6	
Liberal Democrats	David Grace	317	6.7	
Conservative	Daniel Coughlan	262	5.6	
Conservative	Linda Yeatman	228	4.8	
Majority				
Turnout				
Labour gain from Liberal Democrats		Swing		
Labour hold		Swing		

=== Queen Edith's ===
Queen Edith's
Party	Candidate	Votes	%	±%
Liberal Democrats	Tim Moore	1,362	42.6	+6.9
Labour Co-op	John Beresford	951	29.7	−9.2
Conservative	Vince Marino	522	16.3	−2.7
Green	Joel Chalfen	363	11.4	+5.0
Majority				
Turnout				
Liberal Democrats hold		Swing		

=== Romsey ===
Romsey
Party	Candidate	Votes	%	±%
Labour	Dave Baigent	1,205	41.6	+8.6
Liberal Democrats	Paul Saunders	1,093	37.7	−3.7
Green	Megan Parry	394	13.6	+13.6
Conservative	Simon Lee	206	7.1	0.0
Majority				
Turnout				
Labour gain from Liberal Democrats		Swing		

=== Trumpington ===
Trumpington
Party	Candidate	Votes	%	±%
Liberal Democrats	Nicholas Avery	1,066	46.2	+13.6
Conservative	Richard Jeffs	802	34.8	−1.8
Labour Co-op	Tim Sykes	440	19.1	+2.8
Majority				
Turnout				
Liberal Democrats hold		Swing		

=== West Chesterton ===
West Chesterton
Party	Candidate	Votes	%	±%
Liberal Democrats	Ysanne Austin	1,294	39.6	+2.9
Labour	Mike Sargeant	1,275	39.0	+6.2
Conservative	James Strachan	353	10.8	−5.5
Green	Shayne Mitchell	347	10.6	−3.6
Majority				
Turnout				
Liberal Democrats hold		Swing		

== By-elections ==
=== Queen's Edith ===
A by-election was called due to the resignation of the incumbent Labour Party councillor Sue Birtles.

Queen's Edith: 13 November 2014
Party	Candidate	Votes	%	±%
Liberal Democrats	Viki Sanders	933	36.5	−6.1
Labour	Rahima Ahammed	790	30.9	+1.2
Conservative	Andrew Bower	614	24.0	+7.7
Green	Joel Chalfen	222	8.7	−2.7
Majority		143	5.6	
Turnout		2,559		
Liberal Democrats gain from Labour		Swing	▼3.7	
