= 2008 Cambridge City Council election =

Cambridge City Council election

Map of the results

The 2008 Cambridge City Council election took place on 1 May 2008 to elect members of Cambridge City Council in England. This was on the same day as other nationwide local elections.

== Results summary ==
2008 Cambridge City Council election
Party	This election			Full council			This election		
Party	Seats	Net	Seats %	Other	Total	Total %	Votes	Votes %	+/−
Liberal Democrats	8	▼1	57.1	20	28	66.7	9,718	32.8	-0.3
Labour	3	▼2	21.4	8	11	26.2	7,624	25.7	-1.4
Conservative	1	▲1	7.1	0	1	2.4	7,410	25.0	+0.1
Green	1	▲1	7.1	0	1	2.4	3,374	11.4	-1.3
Independent	1	▲1	7.1	0	1	2.4	851	2.9	N/A
Left List	0	Steady	0.0	0	0	0.0	328	1.1	N/A
UKIP	0	Steady	0.0	0	0	0.0	165	0.6	-0.5
English Democrat	0	Steady	0.0	0	0	0.0	161	0.5	N/A

== Ward results ==
=== Abbey ===
Abbey
Party	Candidate	Votes	%	±%
Green	Margaret Wright	812	41.4	+11.4
Labour	John Durrant	645	32.9	−2.6
Conservative	Andrew Bower	376	19.2	−0.9
Liberal Democrats	Callie Leroux	129	6.6	−7.8
Majority		167	8.5	—
Turnout		1,962	31.0	+0.2
Green gain from Labour		Swing	▲7.0	

=== Arbury ===
Arbury
Party	Candidate	Votes	%	±%
Labour	Mike Todd-Jones	941	35.3	±0.0
Liberal Democrats	Rhodri James	908	34.1	−1.7
Conservative	Shapour Meftah	468	17.6	−2.7
Green	Catherine Terry	187	7.0	−1.5
English Democrat	Tim Hawke	161	6.0	N/A
Majority		33	1.2	—
Turnout		2,665	40.8	+3.4
Labour gain from Liberal Democrats		Swing	▲0.9	

=== Castle ===
Castle
Party	Candidate	Votes	%	±%
Independent	John Hipkin	851	39.0	N/A
Liberal Democrats	Valerie Holt	707	32.4	−10.1
Conservative	Edward MacNaghten	255	11.7	−14.1
Labour	Sam Wakeford	225	10.3	−5.1
Green	Stephen Lawrence	145	6.6	−9.7
Majority		144	6.6	—
Turnout		2,183	33.9	+4.1
Independent gain from Liberal Democrats		Swing	▲24.6	

=== Cherry Hinton ===
Cherry Hinton
Party	Candidate	Votes	%	±%
Labour	Robert Dryden	1,247	52.0	+5.9
Conservative	Sarah El-Neil	827	34.5	+1.9
Liberal Democrats	Savid Willingham	167	7.0	−3.5
Green	Neil Ford	157	6.5	+1.2
Majority		420	17.5	+4.4
Turnout		2,398	39.2	−0.2
Labour hold		Swing	▲2.0	

=== Coleridge ===
Coleridge
Party	Candidate	Votes	%	±%
Conservative	Christopher Howell	955	40.2	+8.3
Labour	Tariq Sadiq	941	39.7	+1.7
Liberal Democrats	Alain Desmeir	219	9.2	−4.6
Green	Valerie Hopkins	193	8.1	−3.1
UKIP	Albert Watts	65	2.7	−2.4
Majority		14	0.5	—
Turnout		2,373	39.4	+3.1
Conservative gain from Labour		Swing	▲3.3	

=== East Chesterton ===
East Chesterton
Party	Candidate	Votes	%	±%
Liberal Democrats	Jennifer Liddle	777	38.4	+3.8
Conservative	Kevin Francis	576	28.5	+0.9
Labour	Stefan Haselwimmer	368	18.2	−3.4
Green	Peter Pope	203	10.0	−0.7
UKIP	Peter Burkinshaw	100	4.9	−0.5
Majority		201	9.9	+2.9
Turnout		2,024	34.5	−1.8
Liberal Democrats hold		Swing	▲1.5	

=== King's Hedges ===
King's Hedges
Party	Candidate	Votes	%	±%
Liberal Democrats	Neil McGovern	760	40.6	+4.7
Labour	Gerri Bird	562	30.1	−4.9
Conservative	Cyril Weinman	419	22.4	+2.9
Green	James Youd	129	6.9	−2.7
Majority		198	10.6	+9.6
Turnout		1,870	33.1	+0.3
Liberal Democrats gain from Labour		Swing	▲4.8	

=== Market ===
Market
Party	Candidate	Votes	%	±%
Liberal Democrats	Tim Bick	645	44.1	+1.7
Conservative	Sheila Lawlor	342	23.4	+2.1
Labour	Nick Dale	255	17.4	+2.6
Green	Shayne Mitchell	222	15.2	−6.3
Majority		303	20.7	−0.2
Turnout		1,464	24.6	−1.1
Liberal Democrats hold		Swing	▼0.2	

=== Newnham ===
Newnham
Party	Candidate	Votes	%	±%
Liberal Democrats	Sian Reid	870	50.1	+5.2
Conservative	James Strachan	427	24.6	−1.5
Green	Jennifer Butler	238	13.7	−2.3
Labour	William Redfern	200	11.5	−1.6
Majority		443	25.5	+6.7
Turnout		1,735	26.9	−1.9
Liberal Democrats hold		Swing	▲3.2	

=== Petersfield ===
Petersfield
Party	Candidate	Votes	%	±%
Labour	Ben Bradnack	857	44.3	−1.0
Liberal Democrats	Elizabeth Parkin	541	28.0	−6.9
Conservative	Jonathan Newton	301	15.6	+5.4
Green	Simon Sedgwick-Jell	236	12.2	+2.6
Majority		316	16.3	+5.8
Turnout		1,935	31.4	−7.3
Labour hold		Swing	▲3.0	

=== Queen Edith's ===
Queen Edith's
Party	Candidate	Votes	%	±%
Liberal Democrats	Amanda Taylor	1,250	49.9	−3.5
Conservative	Donald Douglas	838	33.5	+3.8
Labour	Jonathan Goodacre	233	9.3	+0.7
Green	Martin Lawson	183	7.3	−0.9
Majority		412	16.5	−7.1
Turnout		2,504	40.9	−1.3
Liberal Democrats hold		Swing	▼3.7	

=== Romsey ===
Romsey
Party	Candidate	Votes	%	±%
Liberal Democrats	Catherine Smart	791	37.2	+1.0
Labour	Len Freeman	535	25.1	+1.9
Left List	Tom Woodcock	328	15.4	N/A
Conservative	Sam Barker	285	13.4	+2.3
Green	Keith Garrett	189	8.9	−3.8
Majority		256	12.0	−1.0
Turnout		2,128	33.2	−1.7
Liberal Democrats hold		Swing	▼0.5	

=== Trumpington ===
Trumpington
Party	Candidate	Votes	%	±%
Liberal Democrats	Salah al-Bandar	985	45.9	+0.7
Conservative	Peter Hase	828	38.6	+0.3
Green	Ceri Galloway	178	8.3	−0.2
Labour	Pamela Stacey	154	7.2	−0.7
Majority		157	7.3	+0.4
Turnout		2,145	38.7	+0.8
Liberal Democrats hold		Swing	▲0.2	

=== West Chesterton ===
West Chesterton
Party	Candidate	Votes	%	±%
Liberal Democrats	Ian Nimmo-Smith	969	43.2	+3.2
Conservative	Steven Mastin	513	22.9	±0.0
Labour	Mike Sargeant	461	20.5	±0.0
Green	Sarah Peake	302	13.5	−3.2
Majority		456	20.3	+3.2
Turnout		2,245	37.5	+1.5
Liberal Democrats hold		Swing	▲1.6	
