= Zoe O'Connell =

British politician

Cambridge City Councillor, Trumpington Ward
- In office 7 May 2015 – 3 May 2019

Personal details
- Born: 1976 or 1977 (age 48–49)
- Party: Liberal Democrats
- Domestic partner: Sarah Brown
- Education: Brunel University
- Occupation: Politician

Military service
- Allegiance: United Kingdom
- Branch/service: British Army
- Unit: Royal Corps of Signals, Intelligence Corps

Zoe O'Connell is a British Liberal Democrat politician, and a prominent campaigner for transgender rights.

== Political activism ==
O'Connell has campaigned on transgender rights for a number of years, and has been regularly quoted in national publications on these issues. Her contributions include writing for publications including The Guardian and HuffPost about trans issues and experiences, including calling for a greater focus on the safety and mental health of young transgender individuals. She has also criticised the Marriage (Same Sex Couples) Act 2013 for not going far enough to include transgender rights. She is a member of the executive of LGBT+ Liberal Democrats and has co-authored Liberal Democrat policy papers on both equality and on security.

Outside LGBT rights, she has also campaigned on online privacy issues, such as opposing the Snoopers' Charter, on other equalities issues including presentation of titles on driving licenses, and on local issues such as urban speed limits and road safety.

She was the Liberal Democrat candidate for Maldon in both the 2015 and 2017 general elections; finishing in fifth and third place, with 4.5% and 4.3% of the vote respectively. This made her one of a small number of openly transgender individuals to have run for a parliamentary seat in the UK (one of four in 2015, and one of nine in 2017.)

She was an elected member of Cambridge City Council, representing Trumpington ward from 2015-2019, and was deputy leader of the Liberal Democrat group.

O'Connell is also a vice-chair of the Liberal Democrats' Federal Conference Committee, which among other functions selects which policy motions can be debated (and thus potentially become party policy) at the party's federal conferences.

== Personal life ==
O'Connell is herself transgender, and has attracted significant media attention for her polyamorous family life. She lives with Sarah Brown (herself a Liberal Democrat activist and former Cambridge city councillor), Sylvia (Sarah's wife), and a number of snakes.

She has three children by her first marriage, works in managing IT systems, and is a former member of the Territorial Army; she is also a keen rock climber and sailor.
