= 1979 Cambridge City Council election =

1979 English local election

- 3 May 1979

14 out of 42 seats to Cambridge City Council 22 seats needed for a majority
- Turnout: 71.8% (▲33.2%)

	First party	Second party
Party	Conservative	Labour
Last election	22 seats, 46.4%	17 seats, 40.1%
Seats won	5	7
Seats after	20	18
Seat change	▼2	▲1
Popular vote	21,358	21,936
Percentage	38.0%	39.0%
Swing	▼8.4%	▼1.1%
	Third party	Fourth party
Party	Liberal	Independent
Last election	2 seats, 7.5%	1 seat, 5.8%
Seats won	2	0
Seats after	3	1
Seat change	▲1	Steady
Popular vote	12,898	0
Percentage	22.9%	0.0%
Swing	▲15.4%	▼5.8%
- Winner of each seat at the 1979 Cambridge City Council election
Council control before election
Conservative
Council control after election
No overall control

The 1979 Cambridge City Council election took place on 3 May 1979 to elect members of Cambridge City Council in Cambridge, Cambridgeshire, England. This was on the same day as other local elections across England.

== Summary ==
=== Election result ===
1979 Cambridge City Council election
Party	This election			Full council			This election		
Party	Seats	Net	Seats %	Other	Total	Total %	Votes	Votes %	+/−
Conservative	5	▼2	35.7	15	20	47.6	21,358	38.0	–8.4
Labour	7	▲1	50.0	11	18	42.9	21,936	39.0	–1.1
Liberal	2	▲1	14.3	1	3	7.1	12,898	22.9	+15.4
Independent	0	Steady	0.0	1	1	2.4	N/A	N/A	–5.8
Communist	0	Steady	0.0	0	0	0.0	59	0.1	–0.2

== Ward results ==
=== Abbey ===
Abbey
Party	Candidate	Votes	%	±%
Labour	Doris Howe*	2,006	59.9	–7.2
Conservative	Edna Jones	945	28.2	–4.7
Liberal	Bernard Greaves	400	11.9	N/A
Majority		1,061	31.7	–2.5
Turnout		3,351	70.0	+43.4
Registered electors		4,789		
Labour hold		Swing	▼1.3	

=== Arbury ===
Arbury
Party	Candidate	Votes	%	±%
Labour	Edward Cowell	1,797	44.9	–8.8
Conservative	Patrick Harris	1,566	39.2	–7.1
Liberal	Robert Arbon	636	15.9	N/A
Majority		231	5.8	–1.5
Turnout		3,999	71.8	+28.3
Registered electors		5,566		
Labour hold		Swing	▼0.9	

=== Castle ===
Castle
Party	Candidate	Votes	%	±%
Liberal	David Pickles	2,148	49.9	+28.1
Conservative	John Powley*	1,153	26.8	–17.2
Labour	Edwin Mortlock	1,003	23.3	–10.9
Majority		995	23.1	N/A
Turnout		4,304	72.5	+31.2
Registered electors		5,936		
Liberal gain from Conservative		Swing	▲22.7	

=== Cherry Hinton ===
Cherry Hinton
Party	Candidate	Votes	%	±%
Labour	Christopher Howard	1,804	44.2	–3.8
Conservative	John West*	1,683	41.3	–10.7
Liberal	Charles Burch	591	14.5	N/A
Majority		121	3.0	N/A
Turnout		4,078	77.8	+29.8
Registered electors		5,244		
Labour gain from Conservative		Swing	▲3.5	

=== Coleridge ===
Coleridge
Party	Candidate	Votes	%	±%
Conservative	Frederick Burling*	1,730	45.3	–3.2
Labour	Gordon Douglas	1,480	38.8	–3.8
Liberal	Philip Mitchell	606	15.9	N/A
Majority		250	6.6	+0.7
Turnout		3,816	74.7	+35.7
Registered electors		5,108		
Conservative hold		Swing	▲0.3	

=== East Chesterton ===
East Chesterton
Party	Candidate	Votes	%	±%
Conservative	Sidney Reid*	2,057	47.2	–11.1
Labour	Richard Wall	1,605	36.8	–4.9
Liberal	Anita Anderson	699	16.0	N/A
Majority		452	10.4	–6.3
Turnout		4,361	70.3	+35.7
Registered electors		6,204		
Conservative hold		Swing	▼3.1	

=== Kings Hedges ===
Kings Hedges
Party	Candidate	Votes	%	±%
Labour	Clarissa Kaldor	1,544	52.3	–3.9
Conservative	Jacqueline George	944	32.0	–1.6
Liberal	Brian Badcock	462	15.7	+5.4
Majority		600	20.3	–2.3
Turnout		2,950	70.5	+35.9
Registered electors		4,184		
Labour hold		Swing	▼1.2	

=== Market ===
Market
Party	Candidate	Votes	%	±%
Liberal	Lavena Hawes*	2,273	47.2	N/A
Conservative	Michael O'Hannan	1,276	26.5	–2.3
Labour	Mike Gunn	1,263	26.2	N/A
Majority		997	20.7	N/A
Turnout		4,812	66.0	+27.5
Registered electors		6,231		
Liberal hold				

=== Newnham ===
Newnham
Party	Candidate	Votes	%	±%
Labour	R Cohen	2,273	47.2	–1.9
Conservative	P Osbourne	1,276	26.5	–5.8
Liberal	V Alford	1,263	26.2	+7.6
Majority		997	20.7	+3.9
Turnout		4,812	71.6	+26.7
Registered electors		6,720		
Labour hold		Swing	▲2.0	

=== Petersfield ===
Petersfield
Party	Candidate	Votes	%	±%
Labour	Roger Thornely*	1,899	48.9	–1.0
Conservative	Bridget Tasker	1,372	35.3	–6.6
Liberal	Joye Rosentiel	613	15.8	+7.6
Majority		527	13.6	+5.6
Turnout		3,884	65.1	+25.1
Registered electors		5,967		
Labour hold		Swing	▲2.8	

=== Queens Edith ===
Queens Edith
Party	Candidate	Votes	%	±%
Conservative	Sylvia Dolby*	2,317	51.4	–18.9
Labour	Ethel Shepherd	1,199	26.6	–3.1
Liberal	Alan Newman	990	22.0	N/A
Majority		1,118	24.8	–15.8
Turnout		4,506	76.1	+39.6
Registered electors		5,918		
Conservative hold		Swing	▼7.9	

=== Romsey ===
Romsey
Party	Candidate	Votes	%	±%
Labour	Robert May	1,891	49.3	–0.1
Conservative	Stephen Clarke	1,193	31.1	+1.1
Liberal	Anthony Waite	748	19.5	+0.5
Majority		698	18.2	+1.2
Turnout		3,832	68.0	+33.0
Registered electors		5,639		
Labour hold		Swing	▼0.6	

=== Trumpington ===
Trumpington
Party	Candidate	Votes	%	±%
Conservative	Elaine Wheatley	2,019	51.9	–10.2
Labour	Stephen Watts	1,067	27.4	+4.3
Liberal	David Green	747	19.2	+6.5
Communist	David Mowton	59	1.5	–0.6
Majority		952	24.5	–14.4
Turnout		3,892	70.1	+31.6
Registered electors		5,549		
Conservative hold		Swing	▼7.3	

=== West Chesterton ===
West Chesterton
Party	Candidate	Votes	%	±%
Conservative	P Reed*	1,827	49.9	–17.5
Labour	J Elliott	1,105	30.2	–3.6
Liberal	A Gore	726	19.8	N/A
Majority		722	19.7	–13.7
Turnout		3,658	69.1	+32.9
Registered electors		5,294		
Conservative hold		Swing	▼7.0	
