= Lascar =

Sailor or militiaman from South Asia, Southeast Asia, and other territories

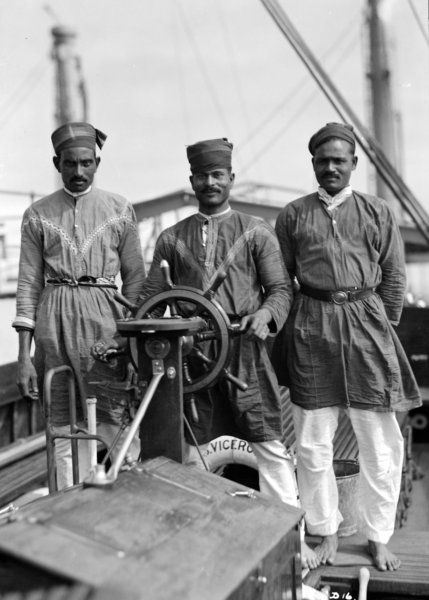
Three lascar crew of the P&O liner RMS Viceroy of India

A lascar was a sailor or militiaman from the Indian subcontinent, Southeast Asia, the Arab world, British Somaliland or other lands east of the Cape of Good Hope, who was employed on European ships from the 16th century until the mid-20th century.

== Etymology ==
The Oxford English Dictionary states that the word has two possible derivations:

Either an erroneous European use of Urdu lashkar army, camp [...], or a shortened form of its derivative lashkarī [...] In Portuguese c1600 laschar occurs in the same sense as lasquarim, i.e. Indian soldier; this use, from which the current applications are derived, is not recorded in English.

The Portuguese adapted the term to "lascarins", meaning Asian militiamen or seamen, from any area east of the Cape of Good Hope, including Indian, Malay, Chinese, and Japanese crewmen. The English word "lascarins", now obsolete, referred to Sri Lankans who fought in the colonial army of the Portuguese until the 1930s.

The British of the East India Company initially described Indian lascars as 'Topass', but later adopted the Portuguese name, calling them 'lascar'.

The word lascar was also used to refer to Indian servants, typically engaged by British military officers.

== History ==
=== 16th century ===
Indian seamen had been employed on European ships since the first European made the sea voyage to India. Vasco da Gama, the first European to reach India by sea (in 1498), hired an Indian pilot at Malindi (a coastal settlement in what is now Kenya) to steer the Portuguese ship across the Indian Ocean to the Malabar Coast in southwestern India. Portuguese ships continued to employ lascars from the Indian subcontinent in large numbers throughout the 16th and 17th centuries, mainly from Goa and other Portuguese colonies in India. The Portuguese applied the term "lascar" to all sailors on their ships who were originally from the Indies, which they defined as the areas east of the Cape of Good Hope.

Through the Portuguese and Spanish maritime world empires, some Indian lascars found their way onto English merchant ships, and were among the sailors on the first English East India Company (EIC) ships to sail to India. Lascar crewmen from India are depicted on Japanese Namban screens of the sixteenth century. The Luso-Asians appear to have evolved their own pidgin Portuguese, which was used throughout South and Southeast Asia.

=== 17th century ===
When the English adopted the term "lascar", they initially used it for all Asian sailors on English-flagged ships, but after 1661 and the Portuguese ceded Bombay to England, the term was used mainly to describe Indian sailors specifically. The term "topaze" was used to describe Indo-Portuguese personnel, especially those from Bombay, Thana, Diu, Daman and Cochin. The term "sepoy" was used to describe Indian soldiers in European service.

The number of lascars employed on EIC East Indiamen was so great that the Parliament of England restricted their employment via the Navigation Acts (in force from 1660 onwards) which required that 75% of the crew onboard English-flagged ships importing goods from Asia be English subjects. The restriction arose due to the high rates of illnesses and death among European sailors on East Indiamen, and their frequent desertions in Asia, which left such ships short of crew for the return voyage. Another reason was the frequent impressment of European sailors from EIC East Indiamen by the Royal Navy in times of war.

=== 18th century ===
In 1756, a British fleet under admirals George Pocock and Charles Watson, with an expeditionary force under Lieutenant-Colonel Robert Clive set off from Bombay with 1,300 men, including 700 Europeans, 300 sepoys and 300 "topaze Indo-Portuguese". Their successful expedition against Kanhoji Angre is one of the first references to the British use of Indo-Portuguese servicemen and one of the first major actions involving the EIC's Bombay Marine. Lascars also served with Arthur Wellesley on his campaigns in India during the late 18th and early 19th centuries. In 1786, the Committee for the Relief of the Black Poor was originally set up to assist lascars in London. However, in a report made after one month of the committee's existence, it was found that only 35 of the 250 recipients of aid were lascars. On Captain James Cook's ill-fated second voyage to the Pacific, HMS Resolution, had lost so many men (including Cook) that she had to take on new crew in Asia to get back to England. In 1797 one group of lascars on the Sydney Cove, a ship built in Calcutta, was shipwrecked on Preservation Island off the coast off Tasmania. That wreck was the first merchant wreck after the establishment of the British colony of New South Wales. Lascars were found as far afield as the United States; in 1784, a dozen were stranded at New Haven, Pennsylvania, leading Benjamin Franklin to organize a fundraising drive for their repatriation.

Lascars were often paid only half of their fellow white sailors' wages and were frequently expected to work longer hours as well as being given smaller and inferior rations. The remuneration for lascar crews "was much lower than European or Negro seamen" and "the cost of victualling a lascar crew was 50 percent less than that of a British crew, being six pence per head per day as opposed to twelve pence a day." Many lascars lived under poor conditions, as shipowners could keep their services for up to three years at a time, moving them from one ship to the next on a whim. The ill-treatment of lascars continued into the 19th and 20th centuries.

=== 19th century ===
The British East India Company recruited seamen from areas around its factories in Bengal, Assam and Gujarat, as well as from Yemen, British Somaliland and Goa. People from India have been travelling to Great Britain since the East India Company (EIC) recruited lascars to replace vacancies in their crews on East Indiamen whilst on voyages in India. Initially, these were men from the Indo-Portuguese or Luso-Asian communities of the subcontinent, including men from Bombay, Goa, Cochin, Madras and the Hugli River in Bengal.

Between 1600 and 1857, some 20–40,000 Indians had travelled to Britain, the majority of them being seamen working on ships. Most Indians during this period would visit or reside in Britain temporarily, returning to India after a short time, bringing back knowledge about Britain in the process. Until the beginning of the 20th century, the population of South Asians in Britain remained exceedingly small, and did not exceed 1,000 at any given time. The lascar population was restricted to a few hundred. Lascars would normally lodge in British ports in between voyages. Some settled in port towns and cities in Britain, often because of restrictions such as the Navigation Act or due to being stranded as well as suffering ill treatment. Some were abandoned and fell into poverty due to quotas on how many lascars could serve on a single ship. Lascars sometimes lived in Christian charity homes, boarding houses and barracks.

Language barriers between officers and lascars made the use of translators very important. Very few worked on deck because of the language barrier. Some Europeans managed to become proficient in the languages of their crew. Skilled captains such as John Adolphus Pope became adept linguists and were able to give complicated orders to their lascar crew. Often native bosses known as "serangs", as well as "tindals" who often assisted serangs, were the only men able to communicate directly with the captain and were the men who often spoke for the lascars. Many lascars made attempts to learn English but few were able to talk at length to their European captains.

Lascars served on ships for assisted passage to Australia, and on troopships during Britain's colonial wars including the Boer Wars and the Boxer Rebellion. In 1891 there were 24,037 lascars employed on British merchant ships. For example, the ship "Massilia" sailing from London to Sydney, Australia in 1891 lists more than half of its crew as Indian lascars.

By 1815, the Committee Report on Lascars and other Asiatic Seamen introduced requirements for equipping lascar workers, that they be provided with "a bed, a pillow, two jackets and trousers, shoes and two woollen caps."

=== 20th century ===
Lascars served all over the world in the period leading up to the First World War. Lascars were barred from landing at some ports, such as in British Columbia. At the beginning of World War I, there were 51,616 lascars working on British merchant ships in and around the British Empire.

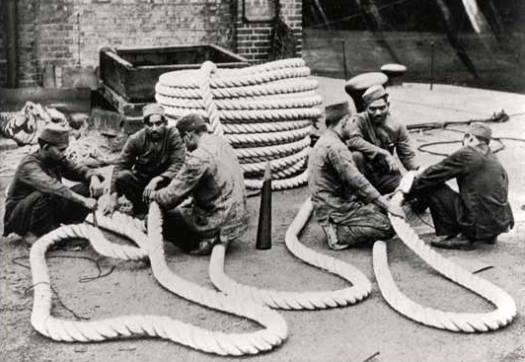
Lascars at the Royal Albert Dock in London

In World War II thousands of lascars served in the war and died on vessels throughout the world, especially those of the British India Steam Navigation Company, P&O and other British shipping companies. The lack of manpower led to the employment of a total of 121 Catholic Goans and 530 Muslim British Indians on the Empress vessels of the Canadian Pacific Railway, such as the Empress of Asia and Empress of Japan. These ships served in the Indian Ocean both as ANZAC convoy ships and in actions at Aden.

In the 1950s the use of the term "lascar" declined with the ending of the British Empire. The Indian "Lascar Act" of 1832 was finally repealed in 1963. However, "traditional" Indian deck and Pakistani engine crews continued to be used in Australia until 1986 when the last crew was discharged from the P&O and replaced by a general-purpose crew of Pakistanis.

== By location ==
=== Mascarene Islands ===
Presumably because Muslim lascars manned the "coolie ships" that carried Indian and Chinese indentured labour to the sugar plantations of the Mascarene Islands, the term lascar is also used in Mauritius, Réunion and the Seychelles to refer to Muslims, by both Muslims and non-Muslims.

=== Britain ===
Lascars began living in England in small numbers from the mid-17th century as servants as well as sailors on English ships. Baptism records show that a number of young men from the Malabar Coast were brought to England as servants. Lascars arrived in larger numbers in the 18th and 19th centuries, when the British East India Company began recruiting thousands of lascars (mostly Bengali Muslims, but also Konkani-speaking Christians from the northern part of Portuguese Goa and Muslims from Ratnagiri District in the adjacent Maharashtra) to work on British ships and occasionally in ports around the world. Lascars made up the largest group of South Asian workers in Britain. The majority of lascars were Muslim but there significant numbers of Catholics and Hindus.

Legislation in the United Kingdom systematically excluded lascars, who were British subjects, from employment rights afforded to white seafarers and barred them from settling in the UK. This exclusion was enforced through collaborative arrangements between the British government, the East India Company, and various shipping firms, alongside British trade unions. When British vessels called at ports in Britain, lascars were not allowed to disembark. When permitted to land, they were confined to designated warehouses or boarding houses. The East India Company, in particular, housed lascars in ship hulks. These overcrowded and unsanitary conditions contributed to elevated rates of illness and mortality among the confined sailors. Despite prejudice and a language barrier, some lascars settled in British port cities, often escaping ill-treatment on their ships as well or being unable to leave due to restrictions such as the Navigation Acts and abandonment by shipping masters. Shipowners would face penalties for leaving lascars behind. This measure was intended to discourage settlement of Asian sailors in Britain.

Until the beginning of the 20th century, the population of South Asians in Britain remained exceedingly small, and did not exceed 1,000 at any given time. The lascar population was restricted to a few hundred. Lascars in Britain often lived in Christian charity homes, boarding houses and barracks and there were a few instances of cohabitation with local women. The first and most frequent Indian travelers to Britain were Christian Indians and those of European-Asian mixed race. For Muslim Indians considerations about how their dietary and religious practices would alienate them from British society were brought into question but these considerations were often outweighed by economic opportunities. Those that stayed often adopted British culture, dress and habits. Although the Indian presence in London during the 19th century mainly constituted male lascars and sailors, some women were included. In the Limehouse and Shadwell areas of London, many lascars formed communities in the Oriental Quarter, areas where they could form connections and retain degrees of fellowship. Conditions in the quarter, however, were no better than that of the streets. Joseph Salter, a Christian missionary known for his work with lascars, once stated that “We are now fairly in the Oriental Quarter; there are several houses here devoted to Asiatics, presided over by Chinese, Malays, and Indians according to the country of the Asiatic seeking companionship, how shamelessness has its premium and admirers, and honestly truth and self-respect are trampled in the dust. Here disease and death decked in gaudy tinseled robes allure the victim to the grave.” Overcrowding in dilapidated accommodation was all too often a sight; slime, dirt and excrement a common experience of life in the Oriental Quarter.

A number of lascars settled down and married local white women, at least partly due to a lack of Asian women in Britain at the time, leading to multi-racial communities in port towns. Some of them converted to Christianity (at least nominally), as it was legally required to be Christian in order to marry in Britain at this time.

Lascars commonly suffered from poverty in Britain. In 1782, East India Company records describe lascars coming to their Leadenhall Street offices ‘reduced to great distress and applying to us for relief’. In 1785, a letter writer in The Public Advertiser wrote of "miserable objects, lascars, that I see shivering and starving in the streets". During the 1780s, it was not uncommon to see lascars starving on the streets of London. The East India Company responded to criticism of the lascars' treatment by making available lodgings for them, but no checks were kept on the boarding houses and barracks they provided. The lascars were made to live in cramped, dreadful conditions which resulted in the deaths of many each year, with reports of lascars being locked in cupboards and whipped for misbehaviour by landlords. Their poor treatment was reported on by the Society for the Protection of Asiatic Sailors (which was founded in 1814).

A letter in The Times stated that "The lascars have been landed from the ship ... One of them has since died...the coffin being filled with food and money, under the idea that the food would maintain him till his arrival in the new other world... Some of the poor fellows have hitherto been shivering about the streets, wet and half-naked, exhibiting a picture of misery but little creditable to the English nation".

In 1842, the Church Missionary Society reported on the dire ″state of the lascars in London″. In 1850 40 lascars, also known as ″Sons of India,″ were reported to have starved to death in the streets of London. Shortly after these reports, evangelical Christians proposed the construction of a charity house and gathered £15,000 in assistance of the lascars. In 1856 "The Strangers' Home for Asiatics, Africans and South Sea Islanders" was opened in Commercial Road, Limehouse under the manager, Lieutenant-Colonel R. Marsh Hughes. The home helped and supported lascars and sailors from as far as China. The home helped with employment and with leaving Britain. Additionally, it served as a repatriation centre where various sailors were recruited for ships returning East. It was also used as a missionary centre with Joseph Salter of the London City Mission as its missionary. Among the things provided by the home were a library of Christian books in Asian and African languages, a store room for valuables, and a place where lascars could send their earnings back to India. Lascars were allowed entrance as long as they had the prospect of local employment, or were on a ship returning East. The collective naming of these groups as "strangers" reflected contemporary British attitudes.

Lascar immigrants were often the first Asians to be seen in British cities and were initially perceived as indolent due to their reliance on Christian charities.

In 1925 the Coloured Alien Seamen Order 1925 Act was brought into law by the Secretary of State for the Home Department. It stated that "any coloured alien seaman who is not already registered should take steps to obtain a Certificate of Registration without delay." Any foreign seaman, regardless of whether they had been in Britain for several months, had to register with the police. In 1931, 383 Indians and Ceylonese were registered.

A letter dated 7 September 1925, from the wife of a Peshawar-born Indian domiciled in Britain and working as a sailor, describes the treatment of some Indians who were British subjects under the Home Office Coloured Alien Seamen's Order, 1925: "My husband landed at Cardiff, after a voyage at sea on the SS Derville as a fireman, and produced his Mercantile Marine Book, R.S 2 No. 436431, which bears his Certificate of Nationality, declaring him to be British, and is signed by a Mercantile Marine Superintendent, dated 18 August 1919. This book and its certificate were ignored, and my husband was registered as an Alien. Would you kindly inform me if it is correct that the Mercantile Marine Book should have been ignored as documentary proof?" Police eager to deport ''coloured'' seamen would often (and illegally) register seamen as aliens regardless of correct documentation.

The transitory presence of lascars continued into the 1930s, with the Port of London Authority mentioning lascars in a February 1931 article, writing that: "Although appearing so out of place in the East End, they are well able to look after themselves, being regular seamen who came to the Docks time after time and have learnt a little English and know how to buy what they want."

In 1932, the Indian National Congress survey of "all Indians outside India" estimated that there were 7,128 Indians in the United Kingdom, which included students, former lascars, and professionals such as doctors. The resident Indian population of Birmingham was recorded at 100. By 1945, it was 1,000.

Surat Alley is a notable activist who fought for the rights of lascars within the Britain within the 1930s and 1940s.

=== Canada ===
Lascars were on board late 18th-century and early 19th-century ships arriving on the Pacific coast of north-west North America. In most cases the ships sailed from Macau, though some came from India. When Gustavus III arrived at Clayoquot Sound on the coast of Vancouver Island, the ship's crew included three Chinese, one Goan and one Filipino. Lascars were barred from entry to British Columbia and other Canadian ports from June 1914 until the late 1940s. Therefore, they seldom occur on landing and embarkation records, though they were frequenting the ports but remaining on board the ships.

=== Macau and Hong Kong ===
After the death of James Cook in Hawaii, HMS Resolution sailed to Macau with her cargo of furs from the north-west coast of North America. The ship was very undermanned and took on fresh crew at Macau in December 1779 including a lascar from Calcutta by the name of Ibraham Mohammed.

Lascars were arriving in Hong Kong before the 1842 Treaty of Nanking. Since the island of Hong Kong was initially a naval base there were Indian lascars of the East Indies Fleet arriving at Hong Kong in those early colonial days. Lascars were housed at several streets in the Sheung Wan area where there are two roads called Upper Lascar Row and Lower Lascar Row. These are not far from the barracks established in 1847 at Sai Ying Pun for Indian soldiers or sepoys.

=== United States ===
Lascars were on board early British voyages to the north-west coast of North America. These sailors were among the multinational crew arriving from Asia in search of furs. Among these was the Nootka in 1786 that arrived at the Russian port of Unalaska and sailed on to Prince William Sound in Alaska. There were ten Indian and one Chinese lascar on this vessel. Three lascars died in Prince William Sound, Alaska. The Nootka sailed back to Asia via Hawaii, and the lascars became the first recorded Indians to sail to Alaska and Hawaii.

== Ranks and positions ==
These sailors served on British ships under "lascar agreements", which allowed shipowners more control than was the case in ordinary articles of agreement. The sailors could be transferred from one ship to another and retained in service for up to three years at one time.

In both deck and engine room departments, the lascars were headed by a serang (equivalent to the boatswain in the deck department), assisted by one or more tindals (equivalent to boatswain's mates in the deck department). Other senior deck positions included seacunny (quartermaster), mistree (carpenter, although a Chinese or European carpenter was often carried), and kussab or cassab (lamp trimmer). An apprentice in either department was known as a topas or topaz. The senior lascar steward was known as the butler (either answering to a European chief steward or in charge of the catering department himself in a small ship). A cook was known as a bhandary.

== Portrayal in literature and cinema ==
In 1800s British and North American literature, lascars are associated with the 'underworld' surrounding the docks in port cities, particularly opium dens, as well as the sea-faring world itself.

Examples in literature:

- Sir Arthur Conan Doyle created a lascar foil to Sherlock Holmes in The Man with the Twisted Lip.
- The crew of the Pequod in Herman Melville's Moby-Dick (1851) includes a Lascar sailor.
- Charles Dickens' The Mystery of Edwin Drood opens in an opium den, where John Jasper wakes from an opium-induced stupor alongside "a Chinaman, a Lascar, and a haggard woman".
- In Wuthering Heights, it is speculated that Heathcliff, the main character, may be of lascar origin. In Tasha Suri's 2018 novel What Souls Are Made Of, which is based on Wuthering Heights, the son of a lascar falls in love with an East India Company officer's mixed-race daughter, with both characters struggling to come to terms with their heritage as a members of the South Asian diaspora.
- In the H. P. Lovecraft short story The Call of Cthulhu, Gustaf Johansen, the last living seaman of an expedition to Cthulhu's sunken city R'lyeh, is assassinated (probably with poison needles) by two "lascar sailors" belonging to the evil Cult of Cthulhu.
- In the original version of Richard Connell's short story The Most Dangerous Game, the main antagonist General Zaroff mentions hunting lascars for sport.
- Lascars aboard the ship Patna figure prominently in the early chapters of Joseph Conrad's novel Lord Jim. In other works of Joseph Conrad, native seamen are frequently referred to by the Urdu term "serang" which appears to share the definition of lascar.
- Frances Hodgson Burnett's novel A Little Princess features a lascar named Ram Dass.
- Caleb Carr portrays two lascars as bodyguards for a Spanish diplomat near the end of The Angel of Darkness.
- Amitav Ghosh's book Sea of Poppies portrays the British East India Company and their use of lascar crews.
- Shahida Rahman's Lascar (2012) is the story of an East Indian lascar's journey to Victorian England.
- Ken Follett's A Place Called Freedom mentions lascars in the second part of the novel.
- Patrick O'Brian references Lascars, Indian seamen employed on British ships, particularly in The Mauritius Command and Desolation Island, showcasing their integral role in the British Raj's maritime operations and their distinct language and culture alongside the main characters.

Examples in cinema:

- In D. W. Griffith's 1919 silent film Broken Blossoms, the opium house in London that the protagonist goes to is described on the intertitle as "Chinese, Malays, lascars, where the Orient squats at the portals of the West".
- In Roy William Neill's 1942 film Sherlock Holmes and the Secret Weapon, which reimagines Sherlock Holmes as a World War II spy, Holmes adopts a brownface disguise as Ram Singh, a lascar sailor, to infiltrate Professor Moriarty's gang.

Examples in video games:

- In the 2018 mystery game Return of the Obra Dinn, four of the crew members of the titular East Indiaman are Indian lascars, two of whom die of a lung disease the ship's doctor states they likely contracted at a lascar house.

== See also ==
- East Indiaman
- Lascar Row
- Lascar War Memorial
- Lascars in Fiji
- Lascarins
- Askari
- Sepoy
- First Anglo-Afghan War
- Kar (suffix)
- Visa policy of the United Kingdom
