= Lascars in Fiji =

The first recorded presence of a lascar (Indian seaman) in Fiji was by Peter Dillon, a sandalwood trader in Fiji. The lascar survived a ship wreck and lived amongst the natives of Fiji in 1813. Dillon has written about Lascar Joe who, according to the Cyclopedia of Fiji, deserted from the brig Hibernia. He lived in Fiji with other beachcombers, hiring himself out as a mercenary to different chiefs in the numerous intertribal wars in Fiji. The Indian indenture ships which carried Indians from India to Fiji between 1879 and 1916 were manned mainly by lascars.

== Survivors of shipwreck ==
In 1813, a group, made up of the crew of the ship, Hunter, and local beachcombers led by Charles Savage took part in a tribal conflict in Wailea to gain the favour of the Waileans so that they could obtain sandalwood. In the ensuing conflict both sides suffered major casualties. Charles Savage was killed, together with 13 others who included three lascars, who were "Jonow, a lascar boatswain's mate; Hassen, a lascar seamen; Mosden, a lascar seaman;" Dillon and lascar Joe survived the battle.

The captain of the Hunter, transferred the beachcomber survivors on board another ship, commanded by Dillon, so that they could be returned to Bau, but adverse weather conditions prevented their landing and the ships left Fiji sailing north-west. On reaching Tikopia, a Polynesian outlier of the Solomons, three of the survivors, Martin Buchert, his Fijian wife and Lascar Joe were landed and the ships sailed to Sydney, passing the island of Vanikoro.

Thirteen years later, on 13 May 1826, Peter Dillon was sailing in command of his own ship, the St. Patrick, from Valparaíso, (Chile) to Pondicherry, (French India), when he sighted Ticopia. He stopped to enquire whether his old friend Martin Bushart was still alive. Both Martin Buchert and Lascar Joe were alive and doing well. When he left, he took Buchert with him, but Lascar Joe had no intention of leaving the island.

== Lascar crew of indenture ships ==
At the start of indenture most of the crews of indenture ships were lascars, but they treated their fellow countrymen passengers roughly and also many got sick in the cold weather, south of Australia on the voyage to Fiji. From 1891 attempts were made to employ more Europeans on the ship, but the crew remained predominantly lascar.

The indenture ship, Syria, which ran aground on Nasilai Reef on 11 May 1884 had on-board 33 lascars, out of a total crew of 43. Of the 33, three died in the disaster.
