= List of shipwrecks in May 1884 =

The list of shipwrecks in May 1884 includes ships sunk, foundered, grounded, or otherwise lost during May 1884.

== 1 May ==
List of shipwrecks: 1 May 1884
Ship	State	Description
Denia	United Kingdom	The steamship ran aground on the Longsand, in the North Sea off the coast of Essex. She was on a voyage from Antwerp, Belgium to London. She was refloated with the assistance of a number of smacks and resumed her voyage.
Matilde	Sweden	The barque was driven ashore and wrecked at Svaneke, Denmark. She was on a voyage from Kalmar to Hartlepool, County Durham, United Kingdom.
Seslin	United States	The schooner was wrecked on a rock near Howkan (54°52′15″N 132°48′05″W), Long Island, Department of Alaska. Her three crew survived.

== 3 May ==
List of shipwrecks: 3 May 1884
Ship	State	Description
Jane M'Call	United Kingdom	The schooner collided with the pier at Maryport, Cumberland and sank. Her crew were rescued. She was on a voyage from the Strangford River to Maryport.
Kate Sancton	United Kingdom	The ship was driven ashore south of St. Bees Head, Cumberland. Her crew were rescued. She was on a voyage from Liverpool, Lancashire to Sydney, Nova Scotia, Canada.
Nevada, and Romano	United Kingdom	The steamship Romano collided with the steamship Nevada and sank in the Atlantic Ocean. All on board were rescued by Nevada. Romano was on a voyage from Hull, Yorkshire to Boston, Massachusetts, United States. Nevada was on a voyage from New York, United States to Liverpool. She was severely damaged and put in to Saint John's, Newfoundland Colony on 6 May.
Thetis	United Kingdom	The ship was wrecked on "Brian Island".

== 4 May ==
List of shipwrecks: 4 May 1884
Ship	State	Description
Tim Whiffler	United Kingdom	The barge foundered off Ryde, Isle of Wight. Her crew were rescued.

== 5 May ==
List of shipwrecks: 5 May 1884
Ship	State	Description
Magellanes	Spain	The steamship was driven ashore at Barcelona. She was on a voyage from Manila, Spanish East Indies to Barcelona.
Riversdale	United Kingdom	The ship was driven ashore at Point Divi, India.

== 6 May ==
List of shipwrecks: 6 May 1884
Ship	State	Description
Northwest Lightship	Trinity House	The lightship was run into by the steamship Corso (United Kingdom) and was severely damaged.
Onega	Russia	The steamship ran aground on the London Chest, in the Baltic Sea. She was on a voyage from London, United Kingdom to Saint Petersburg.

== 8 May ==
List of shipwrecks: 8 May 1884
Ship	State	Description
Gelderland	United Kingdom	The steamship caught fire in the Red Sea. She was on a voyage from Rotterdam, South Holland to Batavia, Netherlands East Indies She put back to Suez, Khedivate of Egypt, where she arrived on 12 May. Her passengers were transferred to Bertha (Flag unknown).
City of Portland	United States	The passenger ship, a paddle steamer, struck Northwest Ledge, off Owls Head, Maine (44°02′56″N 069°02′54″W), and sank without loss of life in up to 40 feet (12 m) of water.

== 9 May ==
List of shipwrecks: 9 May 1884
Ship	State	Description
Constance	United Kingdom	The barque sprang a leak and foundered off Jamaica. Her crew were rescued. She was on a voyage from Old Harbour, Jamaica to Goole, Yorkshire.
Georgina	United Kingdom	The ship collided with the steamship Vale of Calder (United Kingdom) and sank in the River Shannon. Her crew were rescued.
Regina	Norway	The full-rigged ship was driven ashore and wrecked at Gnisvärde, Gotland, Sweden. She was on a voyage from Middlesbrough, Yorkshire, United Kingdom to Ljusne, Sweden. She was later refloated and towed in to Visby, Gotland.

== 10 May ==
List of shipwrecks: 10 May 1884
Ship	State	Description
Cormorant, and George Bewley	United Kingdom	The barque George Bewley was run into by the steamship Cormorant and sank off the Tuskar Rock with the loss of three of her crew. George Bewley was on a voyage from Liverpool, Lancashire to a port in Chile. Cormorant was severely damaged at the bow. Her 22 passengers were taken off by the steamship Avoca (United Kingdom). Cormorant was on a voyage from Cork to Liverpool. She put in to Rosslare Bay where temporary repairs were made. She then put in to Kingstown, County Dublin.
J.S. Seaverns	United States	The steamship sank in Lake Superior at Michipicoten, Ontario, Canada with no loss of life. Her wreck was discovered in 2016.

== 11 May ==
List of shipwrecks: 11 May 1884
Ship	State	Description
Mercia	United Kingdom	The steamship was driven ashore at "Bakari". She was on a voyage from Livorno, Italy to New York, United States. She was refloated with assistance and put in to Patras, Greece.
Syria	United Kingdom	The wreck of Syria The sailing ship ran aground on the Nasili Reef off the Fiji Islands with the loss of 59 lives from her 497 passengers, plus her crew. She was on a voyage from Calcutta, India to Suva, Fiji Islands.
Tunstall	Canada	The steamship was holed by ice and foundered in the Gulf of St. Lawrence (46°30′N 62°54′W). Her crew survived. She was on a voyage from Pictou, Nova Scotia to Montreal, Quebec.

== 12 May ==
List of shipwrecks: 12 May 1884
Ship	State	Description
Dagmar	Sweden	The brig ran aground at Barranquilla, United States of Colombia and was wrecked. Her crew were rescued. She was on a voyage from Newport, Monmouthshire, United Kingdom to Barranquilla.

== 14 May ==
List of shipwrecks: 14 May 1884
Ship	State	Description
Catherine and Alice	United Kingdom	The schooner was abandoned off St. Albans Head, Dorset. She was on a voyage from Middlesbrough, Yorkshire to Nefyn, Caernarfonshire. She was towed in to Weymouth, Dorset by the schooner William Martyn (United Kingdom).
St. Olaf	Norway	The brigantine capsized in Colwyn Bay and drifted ashore at Rhyl, Denbighshire, United Kingdom. Her crew were rescued. She was on a voyage from Norway to Connah's Quay, Flintshire.

== 15 May ==
List of shipwrecks: 15 May 1884
Ship	State	Description
Athanasios Vagliamos	Greece	The ship was driven ashore on rocks just above Port Gaverne, Cornwall. Her three crew took to the boat and landed safely ashore. She was on a voyage from Swansea, Glamorgan to Italy.
Ilyrian	United Kingdom	The cargo ship was wrecked on Cape Clear Island, County Cork. All on board survived. She was on a voyage from Liverpool, Lancashire to Boston, Massachusetts, United States.

== 17 May ==
List of shipwrecks: 17 May 1884
Ship	State	Description
xxxx	United Kingdom	The ship .

== 18 May ==
List of shipwrecks: 18 May 1884
Ship	State	Description
Catherine and Alice	United Kingdom	The ship was abandoned off St Alban's Bay. She was subsequently towed in to port as a derelict. Her captain was found guilty at Liverpool sessions of "... neglecting to take measures to avert the loss of his vessel." He was sentenced to 18 months in prison.
Cupido	Sweden	The brigantine capsized off Skye, Outer Hebrides, United Kingdom with the loss of two lives. She was on a voyage from Malmö to Campbeltown, Argyllshire, United Kingdom.

== 19 May ==
List of shipwrecks: 19 May 1884
Ship	State	Description
Felicia, and Northern Star	Germany; United Kingdom	The steamships collided off Bornholm, Denmark. Northern Star sank. Her crew were rescued. She was on a voyage from Memel, Germany to an English port. Felicia was severely damaged at the bow. She was on a voyage from Burntisland, Fife, United Kingdom to Kronstadt, Russia. She put in to Copenhagen, Denmark.
Retriever	United Kingdom	The steamship was driven ashore on the north of Santorini, Greece and was severely damaged. She was declared a total loss

== 22 May ==
List of shipwrecks: 22 May 1884
Ship	State	Description
Castalia	United Kingdom	The steamship was driven ashore and wrecked near Dénia, Spain. She was on a voyage from Valencia, Spain to New York, United States.

== 23 May ==
List of shipwrecks: 23 May 1884
Ship	State	Description
''Brothers, Flower of Portsoy, Mary Ann, and Velocity	United Kingdom	The ships collided in the River Mersey and were all damaged; Flower of Portsoy and Mary Ann severely.
Unnamed	Flag unknown	The derelict schooner was driven ashore in a capsized condition on the Isle of Skye, Outer Hebrides, United Kingdom.

== 24 May ==
List of shipwrecks: 24 May 1884
Ship	State	Description
Askalon	United Kingdom	The steamship ran aground off "Cape Romania". She was on a voyage from Hong Kong to Calcutta, India. She was refloated and taken into a port for a survey.
Mourino	United Kingdom	The steamship was driven ashore on the south point of Öland, Sweden. She was on a voyage from London to Kronstadt, Russia. She was refloated with assistance and taken in to Oskarshamn, Sweden.
Penelope	United Kingdom	The schooner collided with the steamship Princess Alice (United Kingdom) and sank off the Buchan Ness Lighthouse, Aberdeenshire. Her crew were rescued.
Petrel, and an unnamed vessel	United Kingdom	The schooner Petrel collided with a Mersey Flat off Seacombe, Cheshire. Both vessels sank. Their crews were rescued.

== 26 May ==
List of shipwrecks: 26 May 1884
Ship	State	Description
Daring, and Skeellings	Flags unknown	The schooner Daring collided with the steamshipSkeellings and both vessels sank off the Chicken Rock, Isle of Man. The captain and two of the crew of Daring drowned.

== 27 May ==
List of shipwrecks: 27 May 1884
Ship	State	Description
Constance	United Kingdom	The ship ran aground in the River Avon and was damaged. She was on a voyage from Bristol, Gloucestershire to Rotterdam, South Holland, Netherlands.
Daring	United Kingdom	The schooner was run down and sunk off the Isle of Man. Her crew were rescued by Brothers (United Kingdom).
Eleanor and Jane	United Kingdom	The schooner struck a sunken rock and foundered off the mouth of the River Yealm. Her crew survived. She was on a voyage from Port Madoc, Caernarfonshire to Hamburg, Germany.
Unnamed	Flag unknown	The schooner ran aground on the Brook Ledge, off the Isle of Wight, United Kingdom.

== 28 May ==
List of shipwrecks: 28 May 1884
Ship	State	Description
Progress	United Kingdom	The Mersey Flat was run into by the steamship Renpor (United Kingdom) and sank in the River Mersey.

== 29 May ==
List of shipwrecks: 29 May 1884
Ship	State	Description
Delabole	United Kingdom	The steamship collided with the barque Caspar (United Kingdom) and foundered in the Bristol Channel off the Bull Point Lighthouse, Devon. Her crew were rescued by Caspar. Delabole was on a voyage from Newport, Monmouthshire to Caen, Calvados, France.
Doktor Witte	Germany	The brig was driven ashore at Kastrup, Denmark. She was on a voyage from Stettin to Bristol, Gloucestershire, United Kingdom.
Posang	China	The steamship ran aground in the Fisherman's Group. Her passengers were rescued. She was on a voyage from Hong Kong to Shanghai. She was abandoned as a total loss.

== 30 May ==
List of shipwrecks: 30 May 1884
Ship	State	Description
Westminster	United Kingdom	The steamship collided with the steamship Nerissa (United Kingdom) and sank off the Mouse Sand. Her crew were rescued by Nerissa.

== Unknown date ==
List of shipwrecks: Unknown date in May 1884
Ship	State	Description
Albertha	Netherlands	The brig was abandoned at sea. Her crew were rescued by the schooner Sunbeam (United Kingdom), which put four of her crew aboard. They took Albertha in to Rio de Janeiro, Brazil.
Anna Carolina	Germany	The schooner was driven ashore and wrecked at Kuresaare, Russia. She was on a voyage from Rotterdam, South Holland, Netherlands to Vyborg, Grand Duchy of Finland.
Aspirant	United Kingdom	The barque was wrecked on the Lemon and Ower Sands, in the North Sea. Her crew were rescued. Her crew were rescued by the steamship Nentwater (United Kingdom). Aspirant was on a voyage from the River Tyne to Aspinwall, United States of Colombia.
Boskenna Bay	Flag unknown	The steamship was driven ashore in Chesapeake Bay. She was on a voyage from Baltimore, Maryland, United States to Antwerp, Belgium. She was later refloated and resumed her voyage.
Bulli	New South Wales	The steamship was driven ashore at Paternoster Point, Cape Colony. She was on a voyage from the Clyde to Adelaide, South Australia. She was declared a total loss.
Denderah	Germany	The steamship collided with the steamship SS Rio (Germany) and sank at São Vicente, Cape Verde Islands. All on board were rescued. Denderah was on a voyage from Valparaíso, Chile to Havre de Grâce, Seine-Inférieure, France.
Doris	United Kingdom	The ship was wrecked at "Balanga", Africa before 11 May. Her crew were rescued.
D. W. Pickering	United Kingdom	The ship struck the Harry Furlong Rocks, in the Irish Sea off the coast of Anglesey. She consequently foundered off The Skerries, Anglesey. Her crew survived.
Gothenburg City	United Kingdom	The steamship was driven ashore at Sproge, Gotland, Sweden. She was on her maiden voyage, from Hartlepool, County Durham to Stockholm, Sweden.
Grassendale	United Kingdom	The ship departed from New York, United States for Shanghai, China. No further trace, presumed foundered with the loss of all 32 crew.
Hero	Russia	The barque ran aground at Gibraltar. She was refloated.
Elsa	United Kingdom	The steamship was driven ashore on Romsø, Denmark. She was later refloated and put in to Helsingør, Denmark in a waterlogged condition.
Giulia Anna	Italy	The barque was wrecked at Cape Palos, Spain. Her crew were rescued. She was on a voyage from Surabaya, Netherlands East Indies to Marseille, Bouches-du-Rhône, France.
Harbinger	United Kingdom	The steamship ran aground at Couva, Trinidad.
J. P. Taylor	United Kingdom	The steamship ran aground on the Whitburn Steel Rocks. She was on a voyage from Middlesbrough, Yorkshire to the River Tyne. She was refloated with assistance and taken in to the River Tyne.
Knight Templar	United Kingdom	The tug collided with the steamship El Dorado (United Kingdom) and sank at Blyth, Northumberland.
L. H. de Veber	Canada	The barque ran aground on the Lereher Rock. She was on a voyage from Saint John, New Brunswick to Avonmouth, Somerset, United Kingdom. She was refloated and put in to Yarmouth, Nova Scotia in a leaky condition.
Nebo	United Kingdom	The steamship struck the Aliwal Rock and foundered. Her crew were rescued. She was on a voyage from Sunderland, County Durham to the Natal Colony.
Orion	Austria-Hungary	The steamship was damaged by fire at Hong Kong.
Pendle Hill	United Kingdom	The brig was reported to have been wrecked. Her crew were rescued. She was on a voyage from Port Mackay, Queensland to Sydney, New South Wales. She was refloated in late June and towed in to Hong Kong.
Pony	Germany	The tug was run into by the steamship Paola (Germany) at Swinemünde and sank.
Ravenscliffe	United Kingdom	The barque was driven ashore and wrecked in the Bahamas. Her crew were rescued. She was on a voyage from Havre de Grâce, Seine-Inférieure, France to Doboy, Georgia, United States.
Rio Branco	Brazil	The steamship was wrecked. All on board were rescued.
River Lagan	United Kingdom	The steamship was driven ashore at Falsterbo, Sweden. She was on a voyage from Ventspils, Russia to Ardrossan, Ayrshire. She was later refloated and taken in to Copenhagen, Denmark.
Senorine	France	The brig was lost on the Grand Banks of Newfoundland with the loss of 62 lives.
Stolzenfels	Germany	The steamship was run into by the steamship Canton (United Kingdom) at Saigon, French Indo-China and sank. All on board were rescued.
William Symington	United Kingdom	The ship caught fire at A Coruña, Spain. She was on a voyage from Genoa, Italy to Cardiff, Glamorgan.
Unnamed	United Kingdom	The Yorkshire Billyboy ran aground on the Nore.
