= Shahida Rahman =

English author, writer and publisher (born 1971)

- শহীদুন নেসসা রহমান
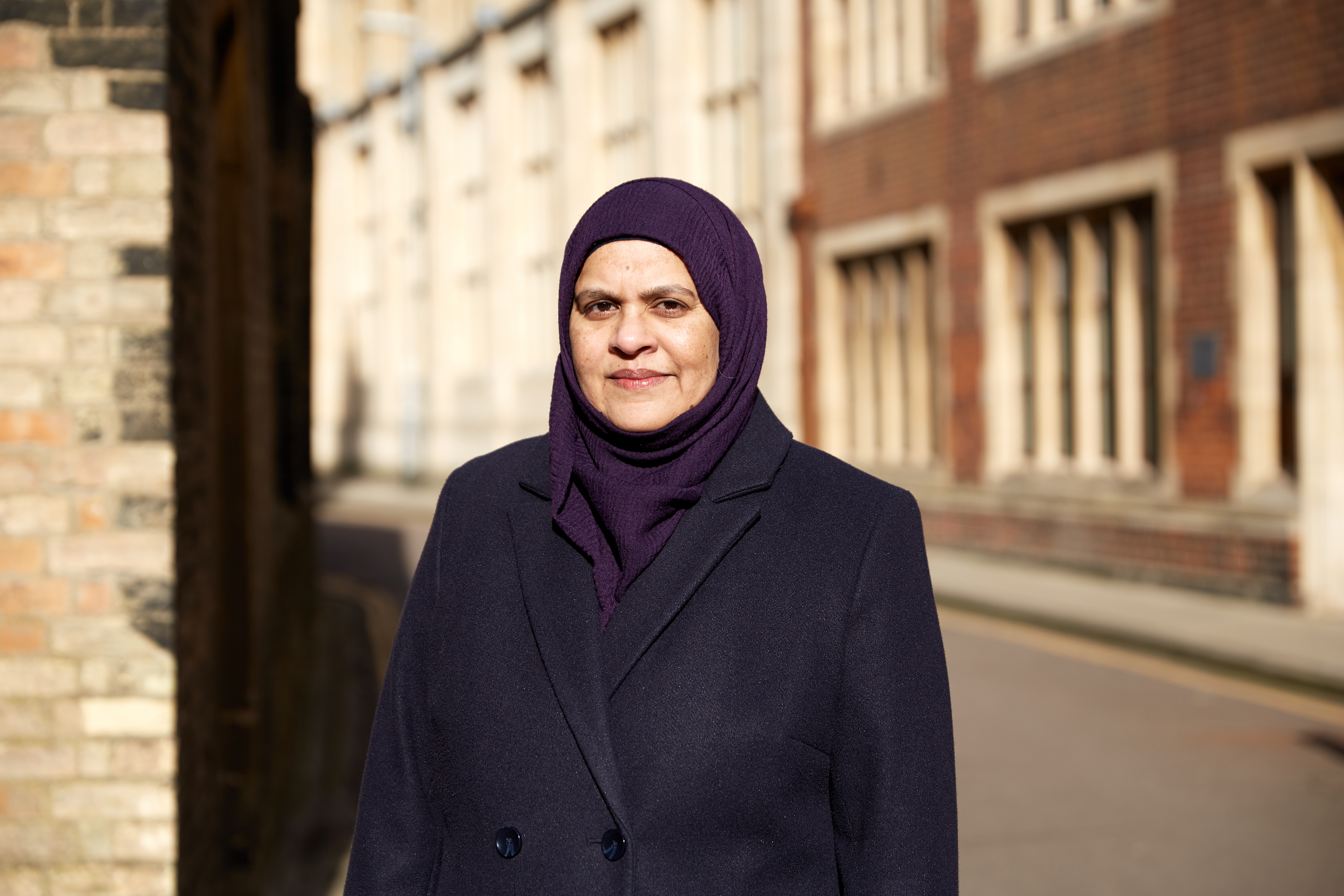
- Born: Shahidun Nessa Karim; 14 December 1971 (age 54); Cambridge, Cambridgeshire, England
- Occupations: Author, writer, publisher
- Children: 4
- Relatives: Abdul Karim (father); Fultera Banoo Karim (mother)
- Writing career
- Pen name: Shahida Rahman
- Language: English
- Years active: 2003–present
- Genres: Fiction, non-fiction
- Subject: History
- Website: www.shahidarahman.co.uk

Shahidun Nessa Rahman (Bengali: শহীদুন নেসসা রহমান; née Karim Bengali: করিম; born 14 December 1971), commonly known by her pseudonym Shahida Rahman, is an English author, writer and publisher. She is best known as the author of Lascar.

== Early life ==
Rahman was born in Mill Road Maternity Hospital, Mill Road, Cambridge, and brought up in Cambridge, Cambridgeshire, England. She is of Bangladeshi descent and both her parents are from Fenchuganj, Sylhet District. Her late father, Abdul Karim, was orphaned at a young age and moved to Cambridge from East Pakistan (now Bangladesh) in 1957 and her mother, Fultera Banoo Karim, arrived in 1963. Rahman has two older brothers, and her father was a restaurateur.

== Writing career ==
Rahman writes historical fiction, non-fiction and short stories. Since 2003, Rahman has been a freelance writer. In April 2005, she launched Perfect Publishers Ltd, a print-on-demand book publishing company providing a range of services for authors and other publishers.

In June 2012, her first historical novel Lascar was published by Indigo Dreams Publishing. Lascar was inspired by stories passed down orally through the generations about one of her paternal ancestors who one of the early lascars (sailor/seaman from East India) to work aboard the British steamships of the 19th century. It was shortlisted for the Muslim Writers Awards, Unpublished Novel Award in 2008 and longlisted for the Brit Writers Unpublished Award in 2010.

In 2009, she was commissioned to write a radio play for the Lascar Heritage Project for Silsila Productions which aired in 2011. In 2010, she co-wrote the screenplay India Ink with American screenwriter Halle Eavelyn which was based on Rahman's short story Homecoming. In 2011, India Ink was shortlisted for the Circalit First Draft Contest and reached the finals of the WriteMovies International Writing Contest.

She wrote The Integration of the Hijab into Police Uniforms which was published in the Behind the Hijab anthology, in March 2009 by Monsoon Press.

Other works of Rahman include: The Integration of the Hijab into Police Uniforms, The Lascar (radio play), and short stories and articles: Currying Favour, Backbone of the Fleet, The Life of Lascars Aboard Merchant Ships, Cambridge's first Gurdwara, Bangladeshis Trade Curry for College and Taxis, Baishaki Mela, Asian Women Suffragettes in the 1900s, Travel with Kids, The Middle Child Syndrome and Noor Inayat Khan.

Rahman has contributed to and been published in the Best of British, The Great War and SISTERS magazines, Asian World Newspaper, Children of the New Earth, The Huffington Post and BBC Radio Cambridgeshire. She was a columnist at Weekly Desh newspaper.

Rahman is currently working on her second historical novel about an Indian Ayah. Since 2014, she has been on the judging panel of the Young Muslim Writers Awards.

Rahman is the former presenter of 'Book Reviews' at online TV channel LB24tv.

== Political career ==
In May 2015, Rahman was a Liberal Democrat council candidate for East Chesterton ward in the Cambridge City Council election prior to the general election. She received 1,165 votes and lost to the Labour Party candidate who had 1,630 votes.

In May 2016, Rahman was a Liberal Democrat prospective councillor candidate for East Chesterton ward for the second time in the Cambridge City Council election. She received 906 votes, a swing of 6% of votes compared to 2015. She lost to the Labour Party candidate who had 1,103 votes.

== Awards and nominations ==
In April 2013, Rahman was awarded a Channel S 'Special Acknowledgement Award' for her work drawing attention to the forgotten Bangladeshi cultural history and heritage. In January 2015, she was awarded the Arts and Culture Awareness award at the British Muslim Awards.

== Personal life ==
In 1990, at the age of 18, Rahman got married. She has three sons Ibrahim, Imran, Aniq and a daughter, Aminah.

== Novels ==
Year	Title	Credit	Publisher	ISBN
2009	Behind the Hijab	Editor	Monsoon Press	978-0955726712
2012	Lascar	Author	Indigo Dreams Publishing	978-1907401718

== See also ==
- British Bangladeshi
- List of British Bangladeshis
- List of English writers
- List of Muslim writers and poets
