= Swan House, Chelsea Embankment =

House in Chelsea, London, England

Coordinates: 51°29′02″N 0°09′48″W

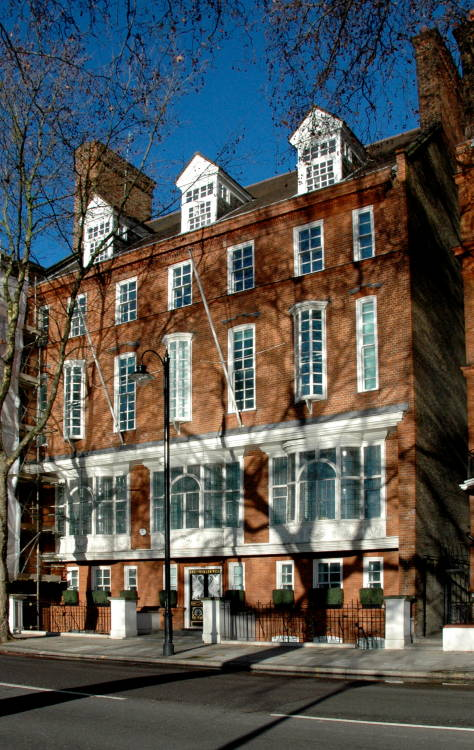
Swan House, 17 Chelsea Embankment in 2011

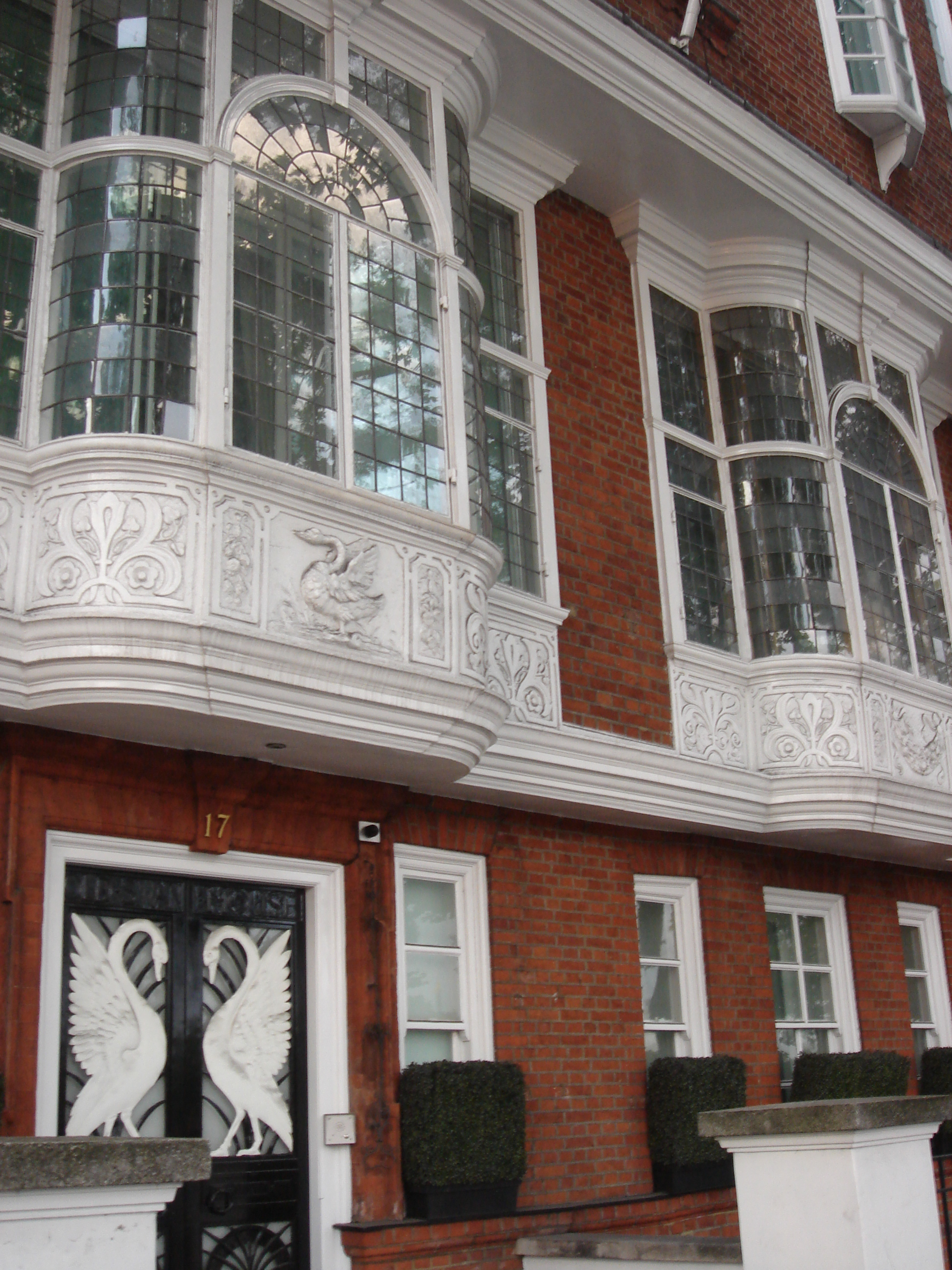
Swan House, 17 Chelsea Embankment

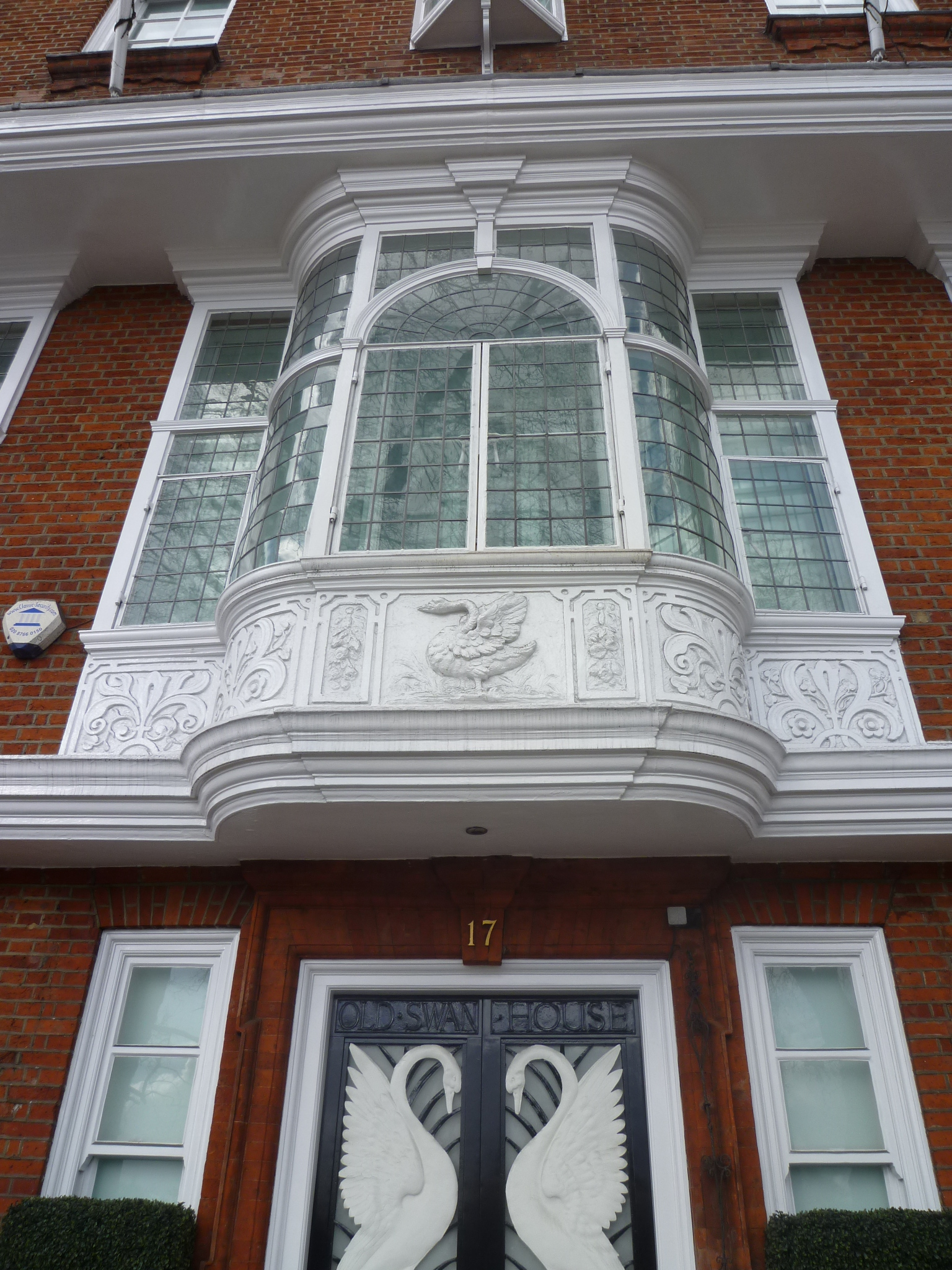
Architect R. Norman Shaw included distinctive bay windows on the first floor

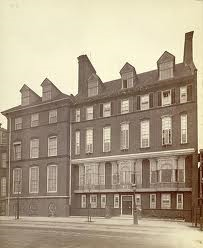
Swan House, circa 1885

Swan House is a Grade II* listed house at 17 Chelsea Embankment on the north bank of the River Thames in Chelsea, central London, England. Built in 1876 by the architect Richard Norman Shaw, architecturally it is relevant both to the Queen Anne Revival and to the Arts and Crafts movement. It was built by Shaw for the artistic patrons Wickham and Elizabeth Flower. Jones and Woodward, in their Guide to the Architecture of London, consider Swan House to be the "finest Queen Anne Revival domestic building in London."

== History ==
The building is one of eighteen elegant contiguous red-brick houses built in the late 1870s, adjacent to the Chelsea Physic Garden by notable architects of the day. In 1892, the journal The British Architect hailed Swan House and its neighbours as "some of the finest specimens of modern domestic architecture in London." The building owes its name to its location on the site of what was an inn named The Swan. Creating some confusion, now it is the newer, current structure, rather than the long-destroyed inn that is frequently called the Old Swan House. The old Swan Inn is sometimes misidentified with any of several Swan inns and taverns visited by diarist and politician Samuel Pepys.

The house built in 1875–76 made a home for solicitor and art collector Wickham Flower and his artist wife Elizabeth. Norman Shaw, known for the Piccadilly Hotel in Piccadilly Circus, Cragside in Northumberland and Lowther Lodge in Kensington, now headquarters of the Royal Geographical Society, served as the architect. Shaw designed the lower part of the building in the Queen Anne Revival style popular during the Victorian era. He incorporated bay windows on the second floor and dormer windows at the top floor for an unusual look. On the third floor, Shaw alternated flat narrow windows with caged oriel windows. In 1892, The British Architect hailed Swan House and the six other homes Shaw designed in the Chelsea Embankment as "masterpieces."

Wickham Flower hired the firm of designer William Morris to decorate Swan House. Flower also bought two pieces from his good friend, American expatriate artist James Whistler—Sweet Shop – Note in Orange and Sun Cloud—to display in his home. Similarities between some designs in Swan House and those in the David Parr House suggest that Parr was one of the art-workmen employed on the project by Morris.

The four-storey building with basement and dormers was listed as a Grade II building on 24 June 1954. Beginning in 1985, Swan House was an architectural studio and office space for many years.

After undergoing a 10-year renovation, Swan House was put on sale as a private home in 2007 for £32 million. The home has a 44-by-18-foot ballroom, a cinema and a basement pool. The house was formerly the headquarters of Securicor, and in 1981 presents for the royal wedding of Charles and Diana were stored there. The 19,000-square-foot home also has a dining room seating twenty, private terraces, an elevator, and parking for five cars.
