= Lascar (novel) =

2012 novel by Shahida Rahman

- Author: Shahida Rahman
- Language: English
- Genre: Historical, Epic, fiction
- Publisher: Indigo Dreams Publishing
- Publication date: 4 June 2012
- Publication place: United Kingdom
- Media type: Print
- Pages: 294
- ISBN: 978-1907401718

Lascar (novel) is a 2012 historical novel written by Shahida Rahman about an East Indian orphan who leaves poverty-stricken Bengal in 19th-century India by becoming a lascar and his extended stay in Victorian London.

== Plot summary ==
Sylheti orphans Ayan Miah and his elder brother Kazi are constantly reminded by their mission teachers of their low caste background and how their aim in life should be to become 'respectable'. Ayan's elder brother develops cancer, due to the incessant chewing of betel nuts, this motivates Ayan to join the seaman (as his father did) in order to earn money and better his brother's health. He finds work as a slave laborer aboard The Bengal, a British steamship making the journey from Calcutta to London.

Ayan is forced to rethink his situation after he realises the financial security that is promised to the lascar is far from the harsh reality of working in prison-like conditions of the trading ship. He soon discovers that it is rare for a lascar to finish his contract and leave with the promised payment. In order to survive and fearing for his life, he realises he must escape the ship. Ayan and his friend, Akbar, devise a plan to escape The Bengal when it docks in London, but to do so, they murder one of their captors, The Cruel One. Ayan and Akbar escape to a new life in Victorian London.

In London, an encounter with the police turns into a blessing when Ayan and Akbar are taken to a hostel where Louisa, an Italian prostitute, teaches them English and shows them how to earn money as street musicians. Ayan accompanies Louisa as an entertainer on drums and sings Bengali songs. When Akbar dies in winter and Louise disappears, Ayan is devastated and left to deal with the loss of his friends and loneliness. Ayan continues to play his music on the streets. He begins to sense growing resentment toward the Muslim community. Increasingly, the local constables interrupt his prayers and mock his devotion. The situation deteriorates until Ayan is falsely accused of arson and sent to prison.

However, when Mr. Lionel Jennings, a Christian missionary, visits the prisoners and chooses him as his servant, Ayan is free again, Jennings gives Ayan an English name, Albert, Ayan learns to read while helping Mr. Jennings manage his business. After 10 years of loyalty to his benefactor, upon the Mr. Jennings' death, Ayan is again cast into the streets of London where, despite his newly acquired skills, he becomes a street cleaner subject to racist attacks. However, he is rescued from one such attack by the rebellious Phoebe Hillary, Mr Jennings' niece, and daughter of Bradford and Yvette Hillary, who he falls in love with. Phoebe is a lady of peerage known for her liberal views. Ayan asks for her hand in marriage and, without the blessings of her father, she accepts. The newlyweds rent a room in the impoverished district of Whitechurch, where Ayan finds work at a factory. But Phoebe misses the privileged life she once had and her misgivings are accelerated when Jack the Ripper terrorises the neighbourhood and a brutal murder takes place close to their home. Phoebe panics and flees to her father's house in Chelsea. Bradford Hillary wants Ayan out of his daughter's life once and for all and falsely accuses him of theft and blackmail, sending him to prison again.

After serving a five-year prison sentence, Ayan meets a ship painter Malik, a fellow East Indian, at the London Docks. Together, they build an import shop. One day, they catch a street urchin named Arthur trying to steal from the store. Ayan discovers that the boy's father was also a Lascar who had escaped The Bengal and became involved with a white woman whose family loathed the idea of their daughter being in love with a dark-skinned Muslim man. Touched by the story reminiscent of his own life, Ayan befriends Arthur. With Arthur's help, the business flourishes.

Financially secure, Ayan decides it is time to return to Sylhet, East India to build a home, and care for his elder brother. Malik shares Ayan's desire to return to his homeland, but with illness plaguing him and no family in India, he has put such thoughts aside. But when Arthur also declares his wish to visit his father's country, the decision is final that all three shall return to India. The excitement of the impending trip takes its toll on Malik's health and, the morning the ship is scheduled to sail, he dies. Torn between burying his best friend and returning to India, Ayan faces a dilemma. When the local Muslim elders arrive at the shop and assure Ayan that Malik will be buried within the Islamic tradition, Ayan and Arthur bid their friend farewell and leave for the docks, minutes before it is set to sail.

However, Arthur and Ayan part company, as Arthur is impelled to board a ship headed for North America, while Ayan is intent on returning home. Ayan recognizes that we are all driven by our unique destinies, and no matter what he wanted Arthur to do, Arthur "would follow the path he was born to follow". After years of prejudice, love, friendship and pain have bestowed wisdom and maturity upon Ayan, his ship arrives in Calcutta. Ayan's journey is over as he is finally back in his homeland, the place he thought he would never see again.

== Characters ==
- Ayan Miah: Protagonist - Asian male, tall, slim, handsome, light skin colour.
- Kazi Miah: Ayan's sick brother - Asian male, overweight, dark skin.
- Akbar: Ayan's Asian friend and lascar. They work together on The Bengal.
- Louisa: Ayan's caucasian friend. She befriends him and teaches him English in London.
- Lionel Jennings: Ayan's caucasian employer who rescues Ayan from gaol. Employs Ayan as his manservant for ten years.
- Phoebe Hillary: Ayan's English wife. She comes from wealth and finds she cannot live without this. She returns to her family home.
- Bradford Hillary: Phoebe's father. He wants Ayan out of his daughter's life and falsely accuses him of theft.
- Yvette Hillary: Phoebe's mother and the woman who raises Mr Jennings children after his wife dies.
- Malik: Ayan's Asian friend. They become partners and build an import shop together.
- Arthur: Asian boy who tries to steal from the shop. Ayan takes him under his wing and plays the father role.

== Development and themes ==
Lascar traces the history of multi-racial seamen who were part of the British trading ships centuries ago. The novel was inspired by stories passed down orally through generations about one of her paternal ancestors who was a lascar (sailor/seaman from East India). Rahman went through recorded accounts of the experiences of lascars.

In a March 2013 interview with The Indian Express Rahman said, "Ayahs, Lascars and Princes: Indians in Britain by Rozina Visram really helped me to understand the history of lascars."

== Release ==
Lascar was released by Indigo Dreams Publishing on 4 June 2012.

== Critical response ==
Farkrul Alam of The Daily Star said, "Lascar is a good read because it has narrative pace, affective passages and the kind of momentum that an entertaining narrative requires to take the reader from its opening pages to its finale. Despite being essentially serious in intent it is light in its movement and the messages it conveys thus does not impede the flow of the tale."

Amber Ali of Asian Image said of the book, "Meticulously researched, Lascar delves into the trajectory of one man's life which is reminiscent of a whole genre of men and their struggle for basic happiness, and the inability of individuals to surmount the social and psychological forces that determine their lives. Rahman has produced an absorbing narrative that remains stamped on the readers mind."

== Awards and nominations ==
Year	Award	Category	Result
2008	Muslim Writers Awards	Unpublished Novel Award	Shortlisted
2010	Brit Writers Awards	Unpublished Award	Nominated

== See also ==
- Lascar
- British Bangladeshi
- Laskar Pelangi
