= David Parr House =

Preserved house in Cambridge, England

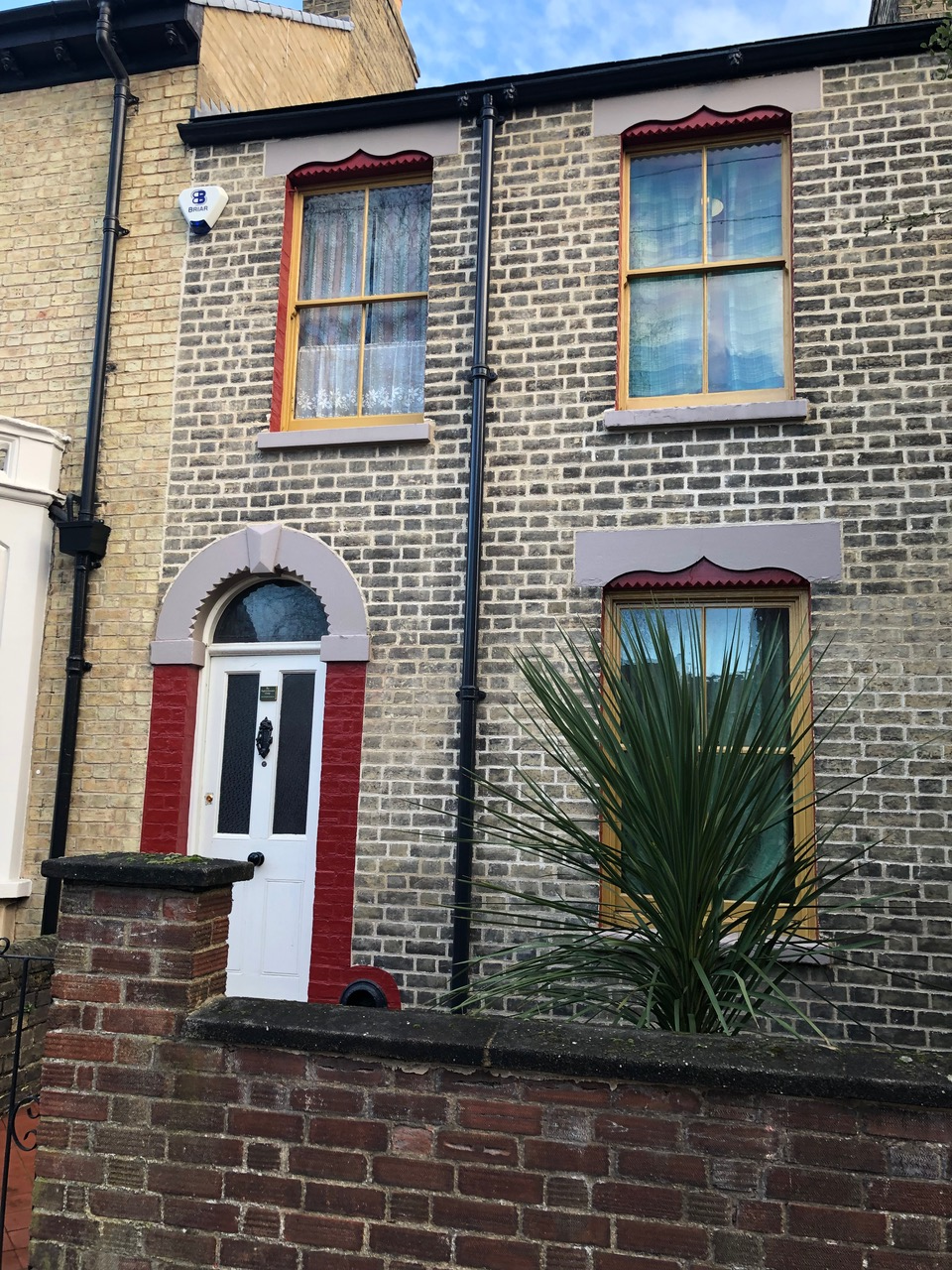
- David Parr House

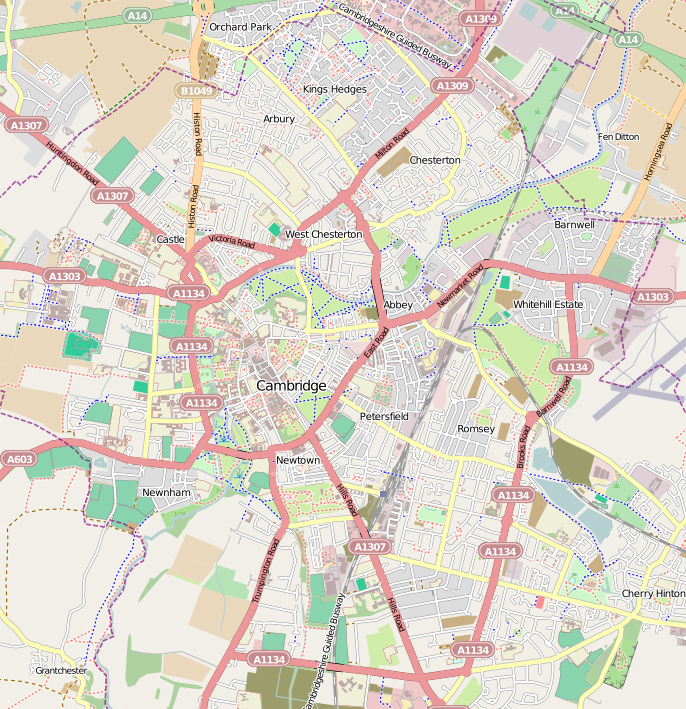
- Location within Cambridge

General information
- Type: Terraced house
- Architectural style: Arts and Crafts, Gothic Revival
- Location: 186 Gwydir Street, off Mill Road; Cambridge, CB1 2LW; United Kingdom
- Coordinates: 52.20019°N 0.13864°E
- Owner: The David Parr House CIO (Registered Charity)

Website
- davidparrhouse.org

The David Parr House is a preserved terraced house in Cambridge, England, with interior decoration in the Arts and Crafts style, executed by its owner, David Parr, between 1886 and 1926. The house is open to the public for guided tours in small groups.

David Parr was a working-class Victorian decorative artist who worked for the Cambridge firm of F. R. Leach & Sons. The firm was a contractor to leading Arts and Crafts and Gothic Revival architects and designers, and Parr worked on projects for clients such as George Frederick Bodley, William Morris and Charles Eamer Kempe. Parr's occupation was termed an art-workman at the time since these were the skilled employees who transferred designs onto the buildings of clients.

In 1886 Parr purchased 186 Gwydir Street, a terraced house off Mill Road in Cambridge. Over 40 years he decorated his own home in the style of the notable interiors he worked on for his employers. After Parr's death in 1927 his widow, and later his granddaughter, preserved the house interiors over the next 87 years.

In 2009 the interior of the house was seen by Tamsin Wimhurst, a social historian and philanthropist while it was still lived in by Parr's granddaughter. The house was essentially unchanged since Parr decorated and furnished it. After the granddaughter's death in 2014 the house was purchased by a charity led by Wimhurst and her husband, established to ensure its continued preservation, and a major conservation programme was undertaken. Similarities between patterns on Swan House, Chelsea Embankment and St James's Palace suggest that Parr worked on decoration of these buildings. The house opened to the public in May 2019 and became a Grade II* listed building in 2020. At the same time, Leach's showroom at 3 St Mary's Passage was listed Grade II.

A plaque to commemorate Parr will be installed on the house in February 2027.

== See also ==
- 575 Wandsworth Road
- Ron's Place
