= Lascar Row =

Street in Hong Kong

Coordinates: 22.284812°N 114.149759°E

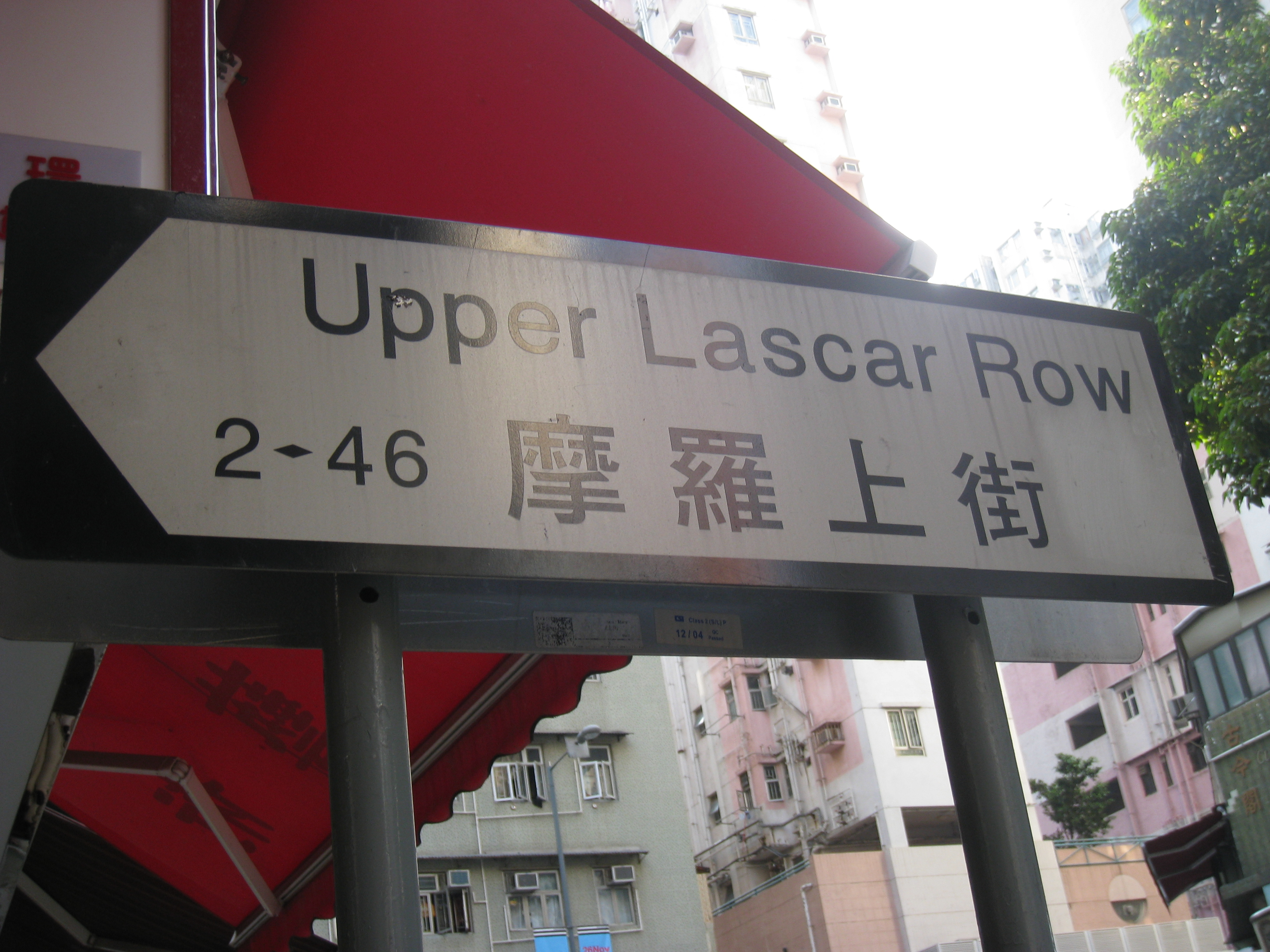
- Street sign in Sheung Wan
- Interactive map of Lascar Row
- Native name: 摩羅街 (Chinese)
- Maintained by: Highways Department
- Length: 225 m (738 ft); Upper Lascar Row: 168 metres (551 ft); Lower Lascar Row: 57 metres (187 ft)

Other
- Known for: Antique Market
- Status: Pedestrianized
Lascar Row
- Traditional Chinese: 摩羅街
- Simplified Chinese: 摩罗街
Transcriptions
Standard Mandarin
- Hanyu Pinyin: Mōluó Jiē
Yue: Cantonese
- Yale Romanization: Mo1 lo4 gaai1

Lascar Row is the combined name of two streets between Hollywood Road and Queen's Road Central in Sheung Wan, Hong Kong, Upper Lascar Row (摩羅上街) and Lok Ku Road (Historically Lower Lascar Row). The immediate area is notable for its antique stalls.

== Name ==
Although 摩囉 is not in the Chinese dictionary, its meaning stems from the English word lascar. Derived from the Persian lashkar (military camp), it was used by the British to refer to Indian seamen. The word 摩囉 comes from "Musselmen", Muslims from the Middle East who traded in China. The name row derives from the row of houses that served as accommodations for Indian seamen.

=== Other names ===
The Indian community formed a mini market, which provided a place for Indians to trade at ease. Since the 1920s, it gradually developed as a market for a wide range of antiques, including obsolete electronic appliances. It therefore gained the name "Antiques Street", along with the neighbouring Hollywood Road.

Cat Street (貓街) derives from the sale by some shops of stolen goods, known as "mouse goods" (老鼠貨) in Chinese. With its lower prices, many were attracted to shop in the area. Shoppers who walked cautiously down the street while selecting their goods were likened to cats trying to catch a mouse. Foreigners, particularly, came to refer to Lascar Row as Cat Street.

== Upper Lascar Row ==
Upper Lascar Row is a narrow alley in Mid-Levels which runs parallel to Hollywood Road on the north side. The straight alley measures over 500 feet (150 m), and there was an Indian police dormitory in the street. On 11 February 1911 a fire broke out on Upper and Lower Lascar Row, destroying 16 houses and damaging another 24.

== History ==
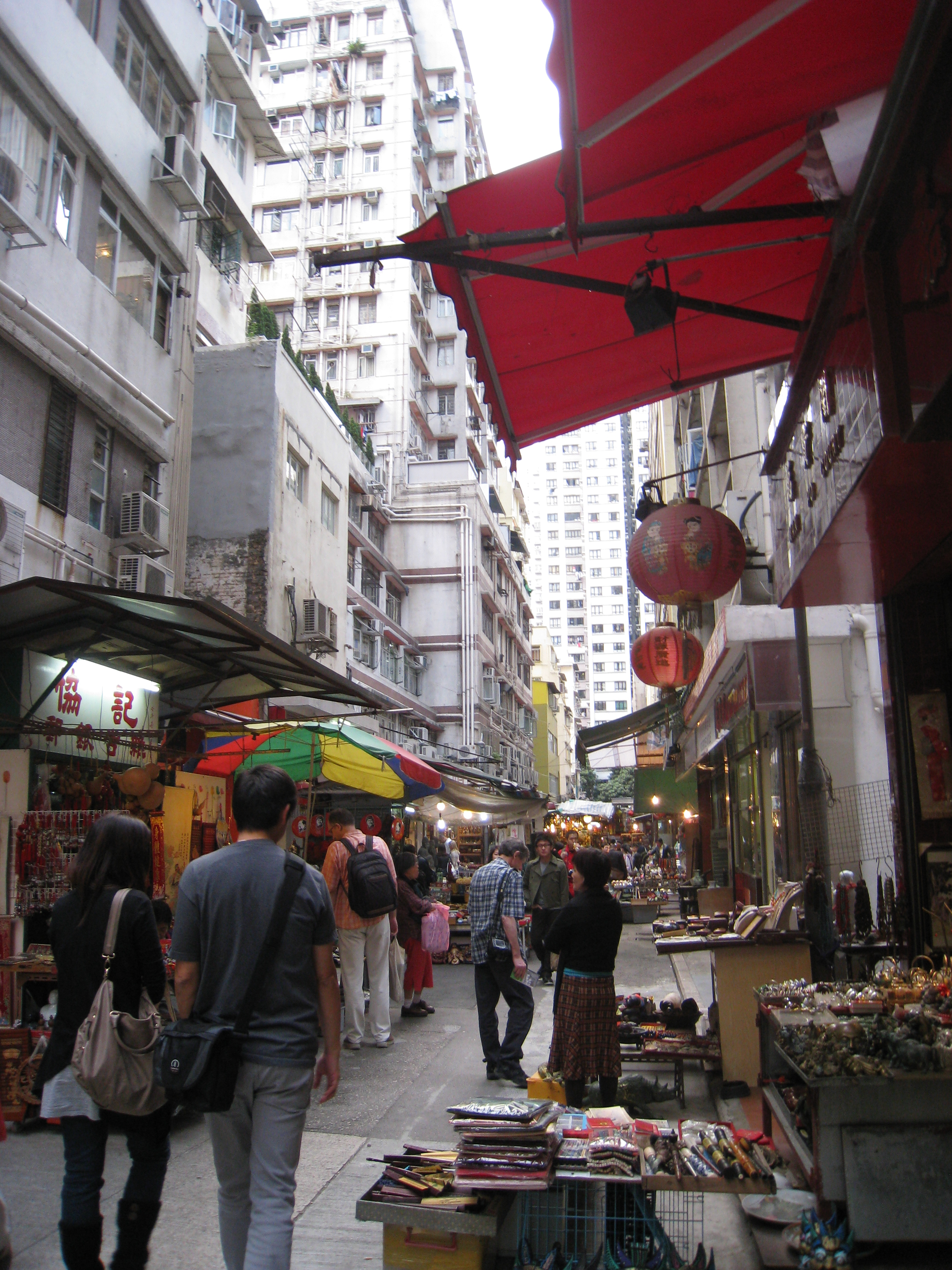
Lascar Row

In Chinese, it is common to use "摩囉" to describe Indians. At the beginning, it did not contain any derogatory sense.

== Shops and products ==
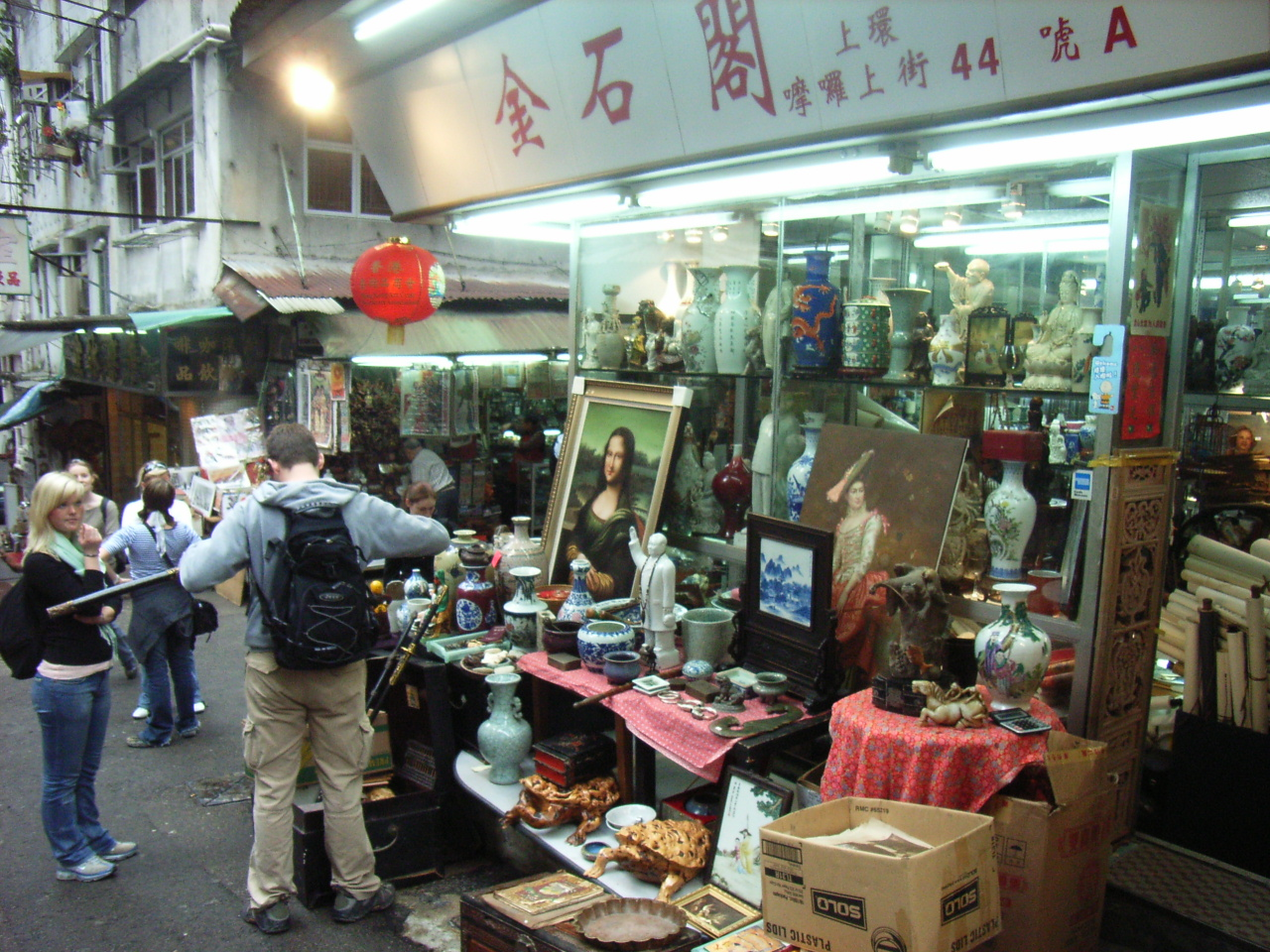
Upper Lascar Row shop

Hollywood Road and Upper Lascar Row's antiques shops have copper mirrors, electric fans, jade gems, watches, ancient coins, Qing dynasty vases, stamps, newspapers and calendars.

=== Renaming request ===
In 2010, eight district officers from the Central and Western District expressed the objection by South Asians to the Cantonese word 「摩羅」 and asked the Hong Kong government to consider changing the name of the street. However, the Lands Department decided not to do so. It ruled that it did not find the word offensive to South Asians. According to some officers, the refusal reflected government indifference to discrimination against ethnic minorities.

The Democratic Party criticised the government for not considering the sensibilities of South Asia, saying that the term is pejorative. According to the government, a name change would diminish the alley's historical value and the word Mouro is neutral. Inconvenience was also cited, since the street name "Upper Lascar Row" has been used for more than a century. Public input was suggested before any name change.

== See also ==
- List of streets and roads in Hong Kong
