= 2016 Cambridge City Council election =

English local election

- 2 May 2016

16: one-third of 42 22 seats needed for a majority

	First party	Second party
Party	Labour	Liberal Democrats
Seat change	▲	▼
Swing	▲	▼
	Third party	Fourth party
Party	Independent	Green
Seat change	Steady	Steady
Swing	▲	▼
- Winner of each seat at the 2016 Cambridge City Council election

The 2016 Cambridge City Council election took place on 5 May 2016 to elect members of Cambridge City Council in England. This was on the same day as other nationwide local elections. The Labour Party grouping gained two seats from the Liberal Democrats, increasing their majority on the council from 6 to 10 seats.

== Results summary ==
2016 Cambridge City Council election
Party	This election			Full council			This election		
Party	Seats	Net	Seats %	Other	Total	Total %	Votes	Votes %	+/−
Labour	9	▲2	64.3	17	26	61.9	15,279	45.9	+11.4
Liberal Democrats	4	▼1	28.6	9	13	31.0	9,172	27.5	-0.1
Independent	1	Steady	7.1	1	2	4.8	776	2.3	+2.1
Green	0	Steady	0.0	1	1	2.4	3,335	10.0	-6.5
Conservative	0	▼1	0.0	0	0	0.0	3,927	11.8	-5.7
UKIP	0	Steady	0.0	0	0	0.0	830	2.5	-1.3

== Ward results ==
=== Abbey ===
Abbey
Party	Candidate	Votes	%	±%
Labour	Richard Leslie Johnson	1,235	61.3	+18.8
Green	Monica Ursula Hone	292	14.5	−3.6
Liberal Democrats	Nicky Shepard	266	13.2	−8.3
Conservative	Angela Ozturk	222	11.0	−7.0
Turnout		2,015	31.9	−23.1
Labour hold		Swing	13.6	

=== Arbury ===
Arbury
Party	Candidate	Votes	%	±%
Labour	Mike Todd-Jones	1,430	61.5	+22.4
Conservative	James Andrew Strachan	282	12.1	−1.4
Liberal Democrats	Timothy Derek Ward	368	15.8	−11.4
Green	Stephen Roger Lawrence	245	10.5	−2.8
Turnout		2,325	37.4	−21.6
Labour hold		Swing	16.9	

=== Castle ===
Castle
Party	Candidate	Votes	%	±%
Independent	John Hipkin	776	37.9	−11.6†
Labour	Patrick Sheil	562	27.5	+2.0
Liberal Democrats	Mark Timothy Argent	388	19.0	−11.4
Green	Alacia Natalie Gent	191	9.3	−12.1
Conservative	Edward Alexander Macnaghten	129	6.3	−16.1
Turnout		2,046	35.7	−17.3
Independent hold		Swing	-4.8	

†on 2012 election.

=== Cherry Hinton ===
Cherry Hinton
Party	Candidate	Votes	%	±%
Labour	Robert Paul Dryden	1,373	60.8	+19.3
Conservative	Eric William Barrett-Payton	367	16.2	−2.8
Liberal Democrats	Jamie Dalzell	210	9.3	−8.5
UKIP	Richard Graham Jeffs	166	7.3	−1.6
Green	Caitlin Patterson	143	6.3	−1.9
Turnout		2,259		
Labour hold		Swing		

=== Coleridge ===
Coleridge
Party	Candidate	Votes	%	±%
Labour	Rosy Moore	1,404	60.3	+22.2
Conservative	Sam Barker	344	14.8	−3.0
Liberal Democrats	Raymundo Leysan Carlos	234	10.0	−14.8
Green	Virgil Au Wenhan Ierubino	187	8.0	−5.2
UKIP	Bill Kaminski	158	6.8	+0.7
Turnout		2,327		
Labour hold		Swing		

=== East Chesterton ===
East Chesterton
Party	Candidate	Votes	%	±%
Labour	Margery Betty Abbott	1,103	41.6	+2.7
Liberal Democrats	Shahida Rahman	906	34.2	+6.4
Conservative	Kevin Andre Francis	262	9.9	−4.6
UKIP	Peter Burkinshaw	202	7.6	−0.2
Green	Jiameng Gao	179	6.7	−4.4
Turnout		2,652		
Labour hold		Swing		

=== King's Hedges ===
King's Hedges
Party	Candidate	Votes	%	±%
Labour	Nigel Gawthrope	981	54.5	+15.5
Liberal Democrats	Hugh Bernard Newsam	233	13.7	+13.0
UKIP	Dave Corn	223	12.4	+0.4
Conservative	Anette Karimi	212	11.8	+3.9
Green	Angela Kalinzi Ditchfield	152	8.4	−1.7
Turnout		1,801		
Labour hold		Swing		

=== Market ===
Market
Party	Candidate	Votes	%	±%
Liberal Democrats	Tim Bick	777	38.5	+11.1
Labour	Danielle Greene	717	35.5	+8.0
Green	Stuart James Tuckwood	401	19.9	−7.8
Conservative	Barney Baber	125	6.2	−11.3
Turnout		2,020		
Liberal Democrats hold		Swing		

=== Newnham ===
Newnham
Party	Candidate	Votes	%	±%
Liberal Democrats	Lucy Nethsingha	939	43.2	+10.5
Labour	Ewan McGaughey	787	36.2	+8.2
Conservative	Julius Carrington	234	10.8	−5.7
Green	Mark Slade	216	9.9	−12.5
Turnout		2,176		
Liberal Democrats hold		Swing		

=== Petersfield ===
Petersfield
Party	Candidate	Votes	%	±%
Labour	Richard Andrew Robertson	1,305	61.4	+17.4
Green	Sharon Deep Kaur	321	15.1	−8.2
Liberal Democrats	Daniel Stephen Levy	277	13.0	−8.4
Conservative	Catherine Claire Durance	221	10.4	−1.0
Turnout		2,124		
Labour hold		Swing		

=== Queen Edith's ===
Queen Edith's
Party	Candidate	Votes	%	±%
Liberal Democrats	Jennifer A Page-Croft	1,189	43.0	+9.3
Labour	John Beresford	801	29.0	+4.3
Conservative	Manas Deb	544	19.7	−4.8
Green	Joel Henry Chalfen	232	8.4	−3.9
Turnout		2,766		
Liberal Democrats hold		Swing		

=== Romsey ===
Romsey
Party	Candidate	Votes	%	±%
Labour	Sophie Alice Barnett	1,409	49.7	+12.0
Liberal Democrats	Catherine Helen Lindsay Smart	1,016	35.8	+5.3
Green	Jane Heather Carpenter	273	9.6	−12.3
Conservative	Roy Leonard Barton	139	4.9	−5.2
Turnout		2,837		
Labour gain from Liberal Democrats		Swing		

=== Trumpington ===
Trumpington
Party	Candidate	Votes	%	±%
Liberal Democrats	Donald Marshall Adey	1,212	41.3	+4.3
Labour	Nick Gay	755	25.7	+2.1
Conservative	Shapour Meftah	664	22.6	−4.7
Green	Ceri Berbara Galloway	305	10.4	−4.6
Turnout		2,936		
Liberal Democrats gain from Conservative		Swing		

=== West Chesterton ===
West Chesterton
Party	Candidate	Votes	%	±%
Labour	Mike Sargeant	1,417	46.7	+11.5
Liberal Democrats	Nichola Jane Harrison	1,157	38.1	+1.1
Green	John David Bachelor	198	6.5	−5.8
Conservative	Simon Lee	182	6.0	−6.1
UKIP	Celia Margaret Conway	81	2.7	−0.9
Turnout		3,035		
Labour gain from Liberal Democrats		Swing	+6.3	
