= Mill Road, Cambridge =

Street in southeast Cambridge, England

Mill Road
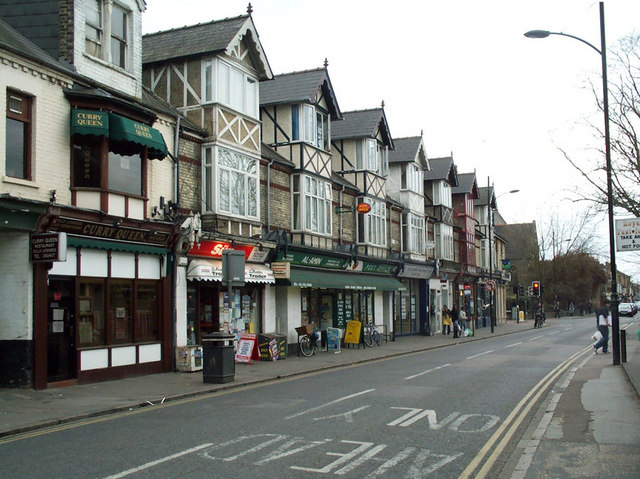
- Independent shops on Mill Road

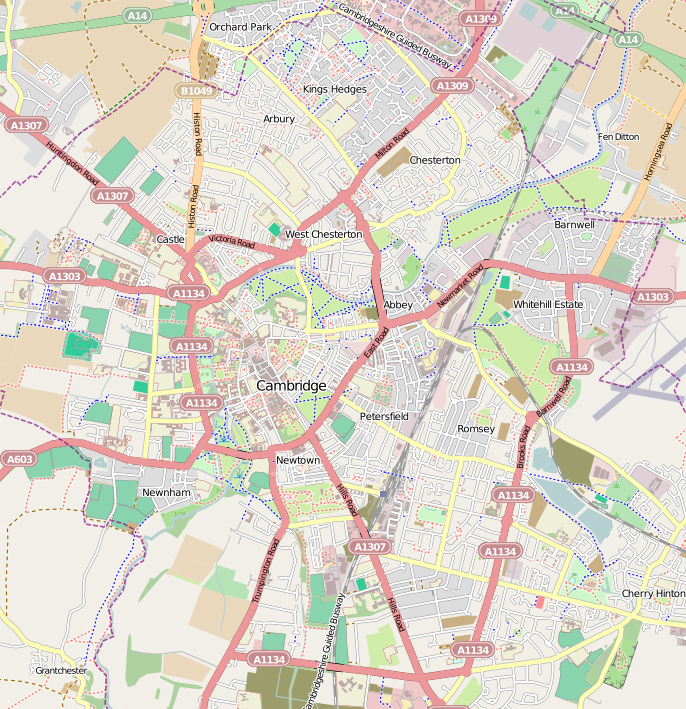
- Location within Cambridge
- Coordinates: 52.1999°N 0.1376°E

Mill Road is a two-lane road in southeast Cambridge, England. It runs southeast from near to Parker's Piece, at the junction with Gonville Place, East Road, and Parkside. It crosses the main railway line and links to the city's ring road (the A1134). It passes through the wards of Petersfield and Romsey, which are divided by the railway line. It is a busy road containing many independent businesses, churches, hospital and Cambridge Central Mosque.

Near the northwestern end to the south in Mortimer Road off Mill Road is Hughes Hall. Behind Hughes Hall is Fenner's, the cricket ground of the University of Cambridge, which has hosted first-class cricket since 1848. To the north is Anglia Ruskin University, formerly Cambridgeshire College of Arts and Technology (CCAT).

== History ==
Mill Road was originally a quiet country lane leading to the southeast out of the city of Cambridge, named after the windmill that stood at what is now the corner of Covent Garden. The coming of the railways in the mid-19th century brought about a rapid development of the eastern part of the city after the University of Cambridge repeatedly blocked attempts to build a more central station. The population of the Mill Road area was listed as 252 in 1801, 6,651 in 1831, 11,848 in 1861 and 25,091 in 1891.

Petersfield and Romsey Town, the areas of Mill Road to either side of the railway bridge, developed in markedly different ways.

Petersfield, to the west of the railway, was originally developed by Gonville and Caius and Corpus Christi colleges (a fact reflected in the naming of the area's streets after college fellows). In 1838 the Cambridge Union Workhouse was opened, a building subsequently to become the Mill Road Maternity Hospital and finally Ditchburn Place, a sheltered housing scheme. Mill Road Cemetery adjoins the Petersfield part of Mill Road to the north and David Parr House, a preserved terraced house decorated in the Arts and Crafts style, is close to the junction of Mill Road and Gwydir Street.

Romsey Town, east of the railway, started to be developed after the inclosure acts of the middle 19th century. Expansion of the railway network drove the building of housing for railway workers and the majority of the houses were built in the ten years after 1885.

Historically Petersfield has always been thought of by local residents as being on the 'Gown' side of the town and gown divide, with many of the residents having been employed by the University. Romsey, on the other hand, remained predominantly working class with a socialist tradition in its local politics, becoming known locally as 'Red Romsey' or 'Little Russia'.

Mill Road

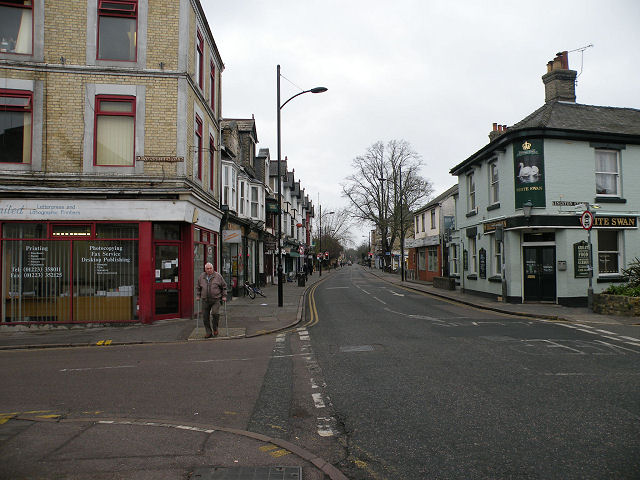
Mill Road, looking toward the city.

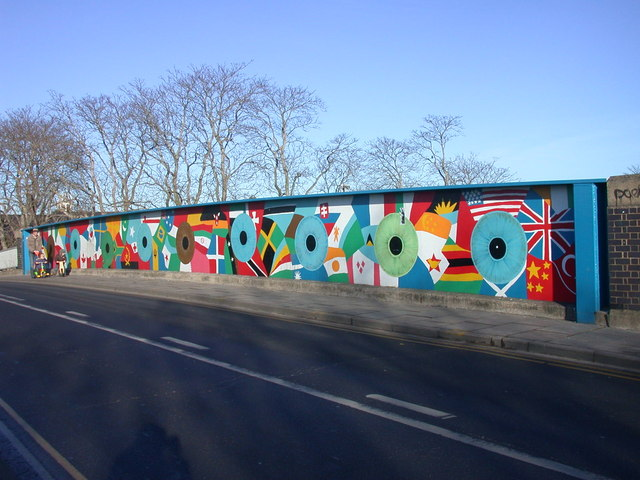
Railway bridge mural.

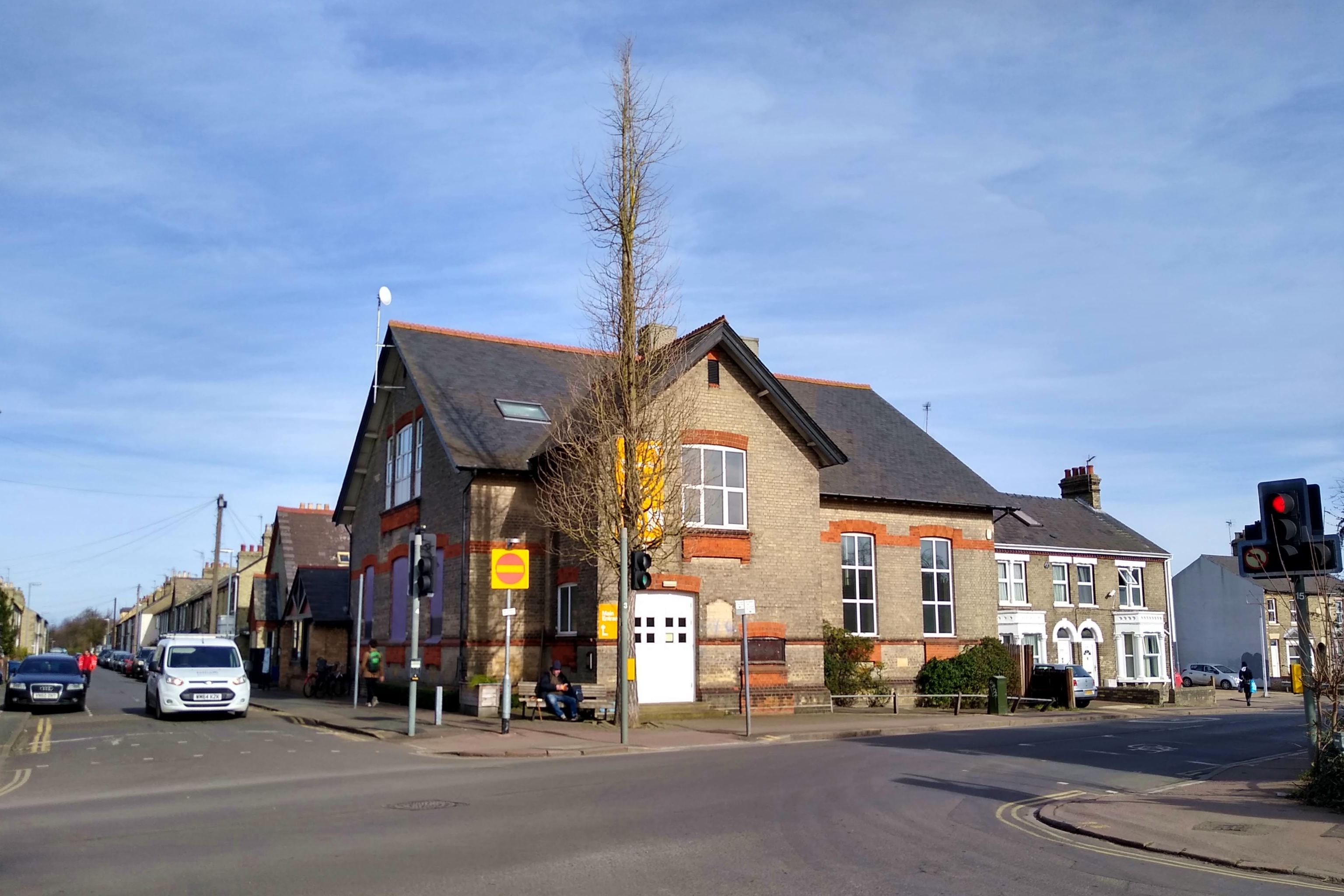
Romsey Mill Centre

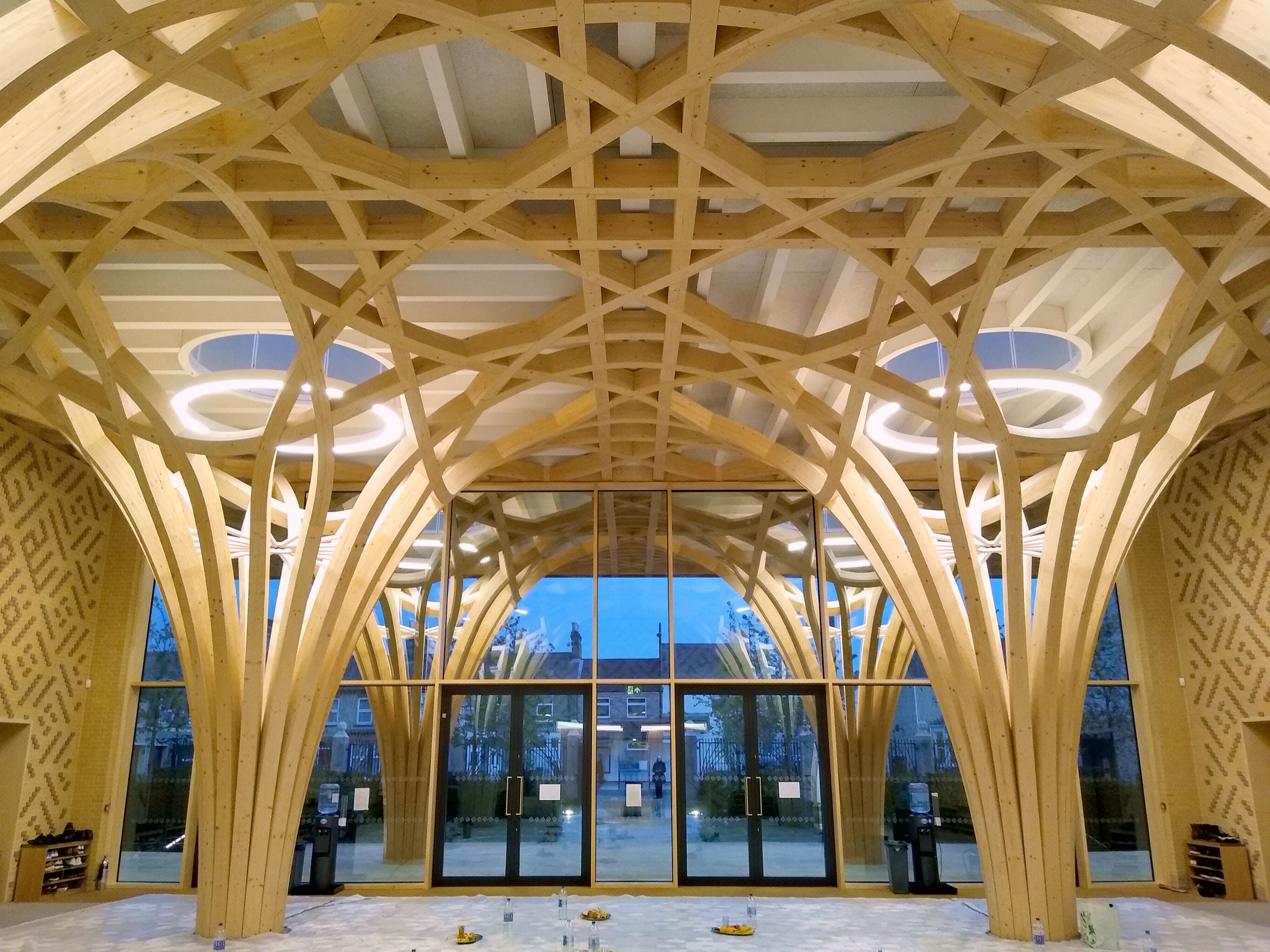
Cambridge Central Mosque atrium, looking towards Mill Road

== Mill Road Winter Fair ==
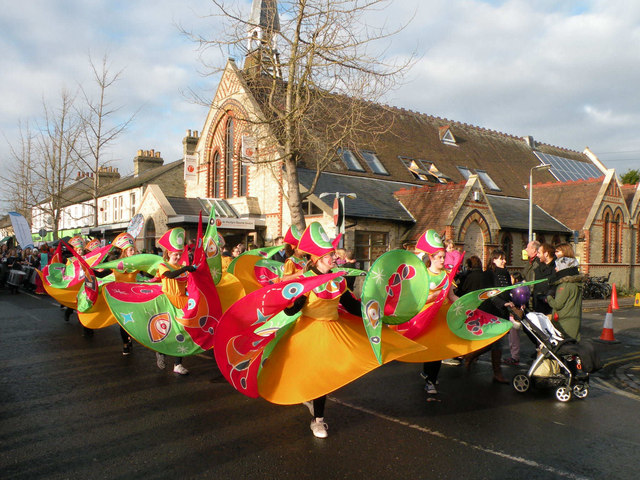
The 2013 Mill Road Winter Fair

The Mill Road Winter Fair is an annual fair on the first Saturday in December. Attendance grew from 10,000 at the first fair in 2005 to at least 20,000 in 2009. Since 2009 part of Mill Road, including the bridge, has been closed to traffic for the duration of the fair. Regular activities include a shop window display competition, live music, folk dancing, a local history walk and open days at the road's churches, temple and mosque. The fair was founded by Suzy Oakes.

== Gateway from India ==
The Gateway from India is an intricate temple archway that was carved by hand in Rajasthan, over a period of five years. In 2006, it was installed in the Bharat Bhavan Hindu temple, inside the library building on Mill Road. Following repossession of the temple by Cambridgeshire County Council in 2020, the archway was bought by hairdresser Piero D'Angelico, a member of Mill Road Traders' Association for £1. Subsequently installed in public gardens in Ditchburn Place. It was opened in September 2023 in the presence of local dignitaries.

== Notable residents ==
The following live or have lived in the Mill Road area:

- Douglas Adams — author. Born at Mill Road Maternity Hospital, 1952.
- Syd Barrett — musician. Born at 60 Glisson Road, 1946. Attended Cambridgeshire College of Arts and Technology (now Anglia Ruskin University) with David Gilmour, 1962–64. Worked as a postman at Mill Road Sorting Office.
- Richard Berengarten (aka Burns), poet and founder of the Cambridge Poetry Festival.
- Allan Brigham — local historian and tour guide. Lived in Cockburn Street, off Mill Road.
- Robert Carpenter — cricketer. Born 18 November 1830 in Mill Road.
- Susanna Clarke — author (Jonathan Strange & Mr Norrell).
- Rajani Palme Dutt — communist ideologue and vice-chairman of the British Communist Party (CPGB). Born 1896 in 25 Mill Road, where his father Upendra Krishna Dutt had founded a medical practice around 1890. The building now houses the Petersfield Medical Practice.
- Rosalind Franklin — scientist. Lived in "very unglamorous digs" on Mill Road as a research student, complaining of her landlady's "little meannesses and uncivilized habits".
- Gordon Fraser — publisher. Lived at 274a Mill Road during the late 1930s. Dylan Thomas attended a notorious week-long drunken party there in 1937 after coming to Cambridge to give a reading.
- David Gilmour — musician. Lived in a flat on Mill Road while playing in Joker's Wild, his first band.
- Colin Greenland — Science fiction author (Take Back Plenty).
- Timothy Gowers — Mathematician.
- Fred Hoyle — astronomer and mathematician. Lived on Mill Road as an undergraduate in Emmanuel College digs, 1933–35.
- Tom Karen — designer of the Reliant Scimitar GTE, Bond Bug and Raleigh Chopper bicycle.
- Mary Kingsley — Ethnographist, writer and explorer. Lived at 7, Mortimer Road.
- F. R. Leavis — notable British literary critic. Born above his father's music shop at 68 Mill Road, 1895.
- David Parr - decorative artist in the Arts and Crafts and Gothic Revival styles, lived at 186 Gwydir Street, just off Mill Road, from 1886 to 1927
- Shahida Rahman - English author, writer and publisher. Born at Mill Road Maternity Hospital, 1971
- Tom Robinson — Singer-songwriter and radio presenter. Born at Mill Road Maternity Hospital, 1950.
- Ronald Searle — Artist and satirical cartoonist. Creator of St Trinian's School. Lived at 6, Petersfield as a child and then at 29 Collier Road while studying at The Cambridge School of Art (now Anglia Ruskin University).
- Tom Sharpe — author (Wilt). Lived on Mill Road while lecturing in History at CCAT between 1963 and 1972.
- Amy Williams — 2010 Winter Olympics women's Skeleton gold medalist.
- Bee Wilson — Food writer, journalist and historian.
