= Allan Brigham =

British road sweeper, historian, and tour guide (1951–2020)

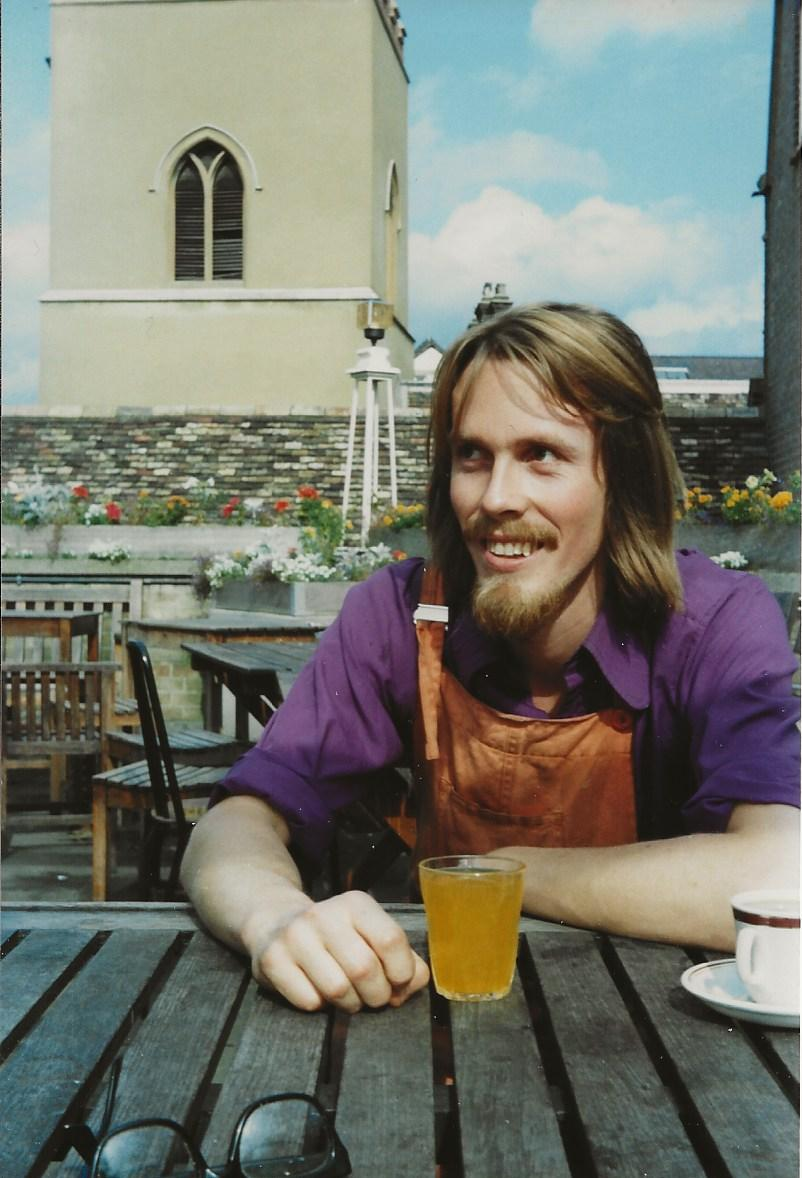
Allan Brigham. Teabreak at Cambridge Arts Theatre roof garden. Summer 1980.

Allan Brigham (1951–2020) was a British road sweeper, historian, and tour guide. His historical writing includes Bringing It All Back Home (2006), a report published by the Chartered Institute of Housing, lamenting the decline of the Romsey neighbourhood of Cambridge, and his many contributions as a founder member of the Mill Road History Project, funded by the National Lottery Heritage Fund in 2013. His honours include a Tidy Britain Group Silver Broom award and an honorary degree from the University of Cambridge.

== Biography ==
Brigham was born in 1951, in Harpenden, Hertfordshire, the son of Michael Brigham, an accountant, and his wife, Helen Hine, a physiotherapist. He was educated at the Leys School, Cambridge. He then studied history and politics at University of Sheffield, graduating in 1973. At Sheffield he was taught by political theorist Bernard Crick and was a contemporary of politician David Blunkett.

Brigham moved to Cambridge in 1974 but could only get a job as a road sweeper. "Roadsweeping was the only job I could get when I moved here. It was meant to be a temporary job but I have just continued doing it. I had planned to be a teacher." He joined the GMB union. For a time he lived in a "virtual squat", a house sublet by computer pioneer Christopher Curry, co-founder of Acorn Computers. He became a Blue Badge tourist guide, and devoted his energies to inspiring the locals of Cambridge about their city, from his personal perspective.

In 1995, Brigham led a campaign that attempted to preserve the public right of way through the Lion Yard shopping centre, and avoid closing the precinct at night.

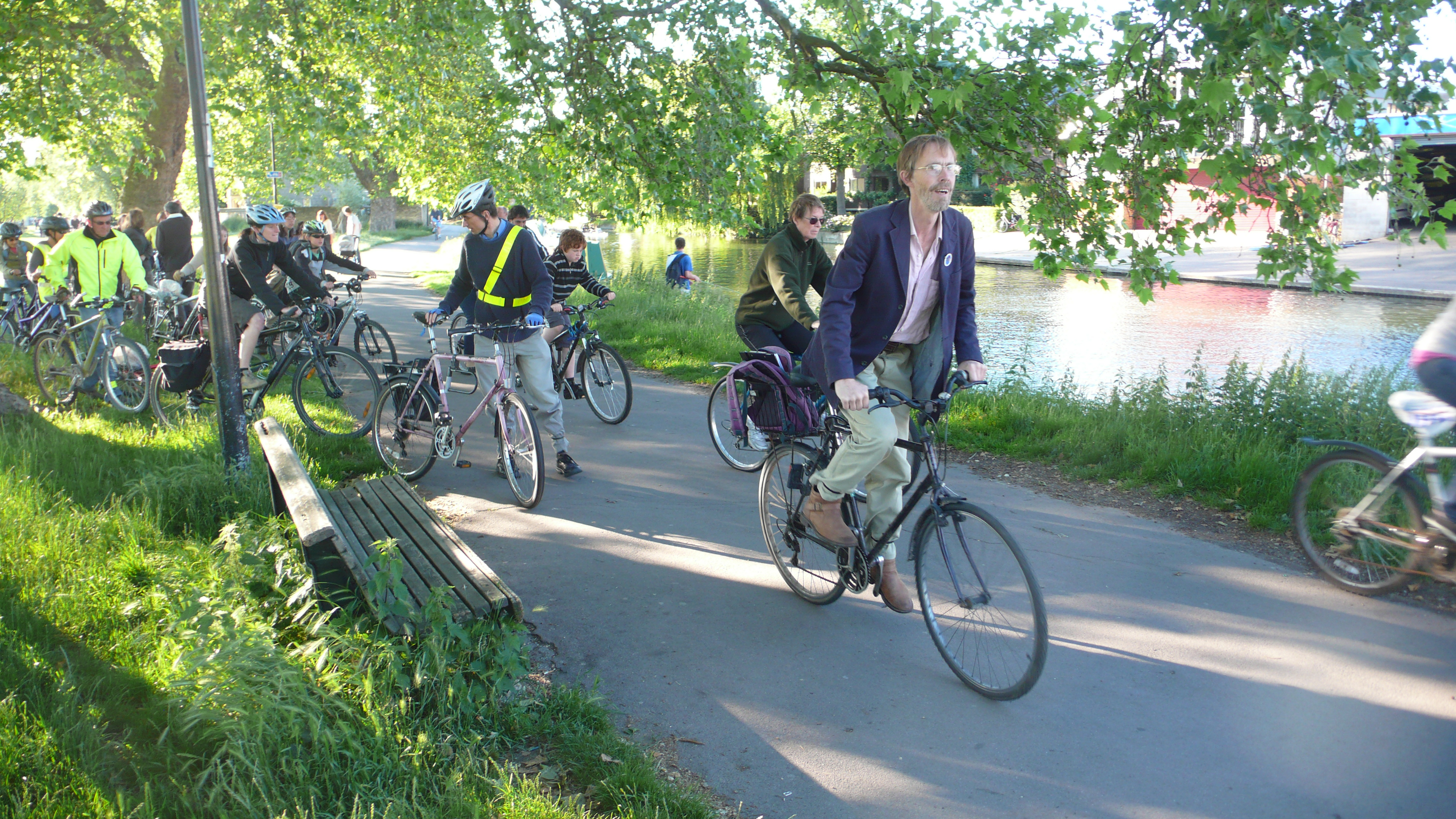
Allan Brigham leading a Bicycle History Tour, 16 June 2010

The "Town NOT Gown" Tours were walking tours around different parts of Cambridge. His website included the quotation: "What an eye opener! We have seen so many things we never noticed before. We can truly say that Allan brought our city to life for us with his knowledge and his enthusiasm. A great guide!" His brother wrote: "Allan was a great communicator and listener, and for him debate and discussion were vital. He used his guided tours to discuss wider issues."

Brigham was a trustee and Chair of the Friends of the Museum of Cambridge for 30 years. He was a founding member of the Mill Road History Society. He was a Senior Member of Wolfson College, Cambridge.

In 2016, Brigham criticized the use of Section 106 funds acquired by Cambridge City Council from property developers: "The city council has rolled over to developers and taken commuted payments for open spaces elsewhere, not on the site which is being developed. This is leading to over-development on some parks and is failing to provide new open spaces in areas of greatest need around new developments in the inner city. We would ask why the council is not trying for the very best, rather than appearing to accept commuted payments so often. Its actions appear to be frequently contradicting its own aspirations."

In 2017, Brigham was quoted in a Guardian report about the CB1 development near Cambridge railway station. Condemning the work of architect Richard Rogers, Brigham said, "We were all taken in by the name Richard Rogers, but now it seems they were just using his name as a fig leaf. This was a chance to make a gateway to the city that we could all be proud of. But they've blown it."

Writing in 2018 in regret at the closure of the Mill Road Depot, where he had first found work as a street sweeper, he was relieved "to see council housing being built, not more student flats".

== Writing ==
Brigham contributed to Society and Public Voices in The Guardian.

The Brigham family moved to Surrey when Allan was still young. He published a study of 19th-century Dorking as Urban Growth in a Surrey Market Town (1988). He co-authored the 1996 book Cambridge Iron Founders, published by the Cambridge Industrial Archaeology Society.

=== Bringing It All Back Home ===
In November 2006, his report Bringing It All Back Home, co-authored with Colin Wiles, was launched at a conference of the Chartered Institute of Housing Eastern Region, four decades on from the TV drama Cathy Come Home. The Guardian reported the launch under the headline "Death of a Neighbourhood" and described how Brigham "charts the decline of Romsey in the 1970s and its gentrification with the arrival of the first wave of educated, middle-class public sector workers a decade later, attracted by the character of the tiny brick houses, their affordability and sense of community."

=== Mill Road History Project ===
In May 2013, the Mill Road History Project received a grant of £99,248 from the National Lottery Heritage Fund for a two-year project to document the history of Mill Road as a tribute to the area's significance in the history of the whole city. Founding members of the team were Lucy Walker, Ian Bent, Melissa McGreechan, Tamsin Wimhurst, Caro Wilson, Allan Brigham, and Sarah Tovell. In October 2013, the Cambridge News pictured Brigham alongside other founder members, at the launch of the Mill Road History Project at Ditchburn Place. Allan said "Mill Road has recently been described as ‘the new Islington’; others still remember it as the route to the Workhouse. The Mill Road History Project hopes to capture memories of people who have lived here all their lives and the stories of those who come here from all over the world. Adapting to change is what Mill Road is all about."

The website of the Mill Road History Society includes a list of his selected writing:

- Allan Brigham (2006). A Community in Transition, Romsey Town, Cambridge 1966-2006. Part of "Bringing it all back home: Changes in Housing and Society 1966-2006" Chartered Institute of Housing.
- Allan Brigham (2015). Mill Road, Cambridge: 1823-1851. Mill Road History Project.
- Allan Brigham and James Ingram (2017). Donkey's Common and adjacent land. Mill Road History Project.
- Allan Brigham (2018). Romsey Recreation Ground: A Brief History: 1898-2017. Mill Road History Project.
- Allan Brigham (2019). The Mill Road Depot. Mill Road History Project.

=== A Brush with the Past ===
In February 2021, his book A Brush with the Past was published posthumously by Cambridge Place Publishing. The book has nine chapters, based on his articles and talks; it is illustrated by Brigham's own photography and edited by Becky Proctor. The opening words are: "Local history is a good way to draw people together. By asking them to think about the past, some will be encouraged to ask how they can shape the future."

== Honours ==
=== Silver Broom Award from Tidy Britain Group ===
In 1999, Brigham was pictured on the front page of the Cambridge Town Crier newspaper, as the first Cambridgeshire County Winner in the East of England Silver Broom Awards, organised by the Tidy Britain Group and sponsored by Anglian Water: the certificate described him as a "special person who not only keeps the environment clean and safe for everyone, but who also does that little bit over and above the call of duty in the service of the community" and the article noted his talks in schools to raise awareness of litter and to help prevent it. He said: "When I started sweeping 24 years ago there was not a single take-away in the centre of Cambridge, everything was not wrapped up twice and syringes were something you only found in hospitals."

=== Honorary Degree from University of Cambridge ===
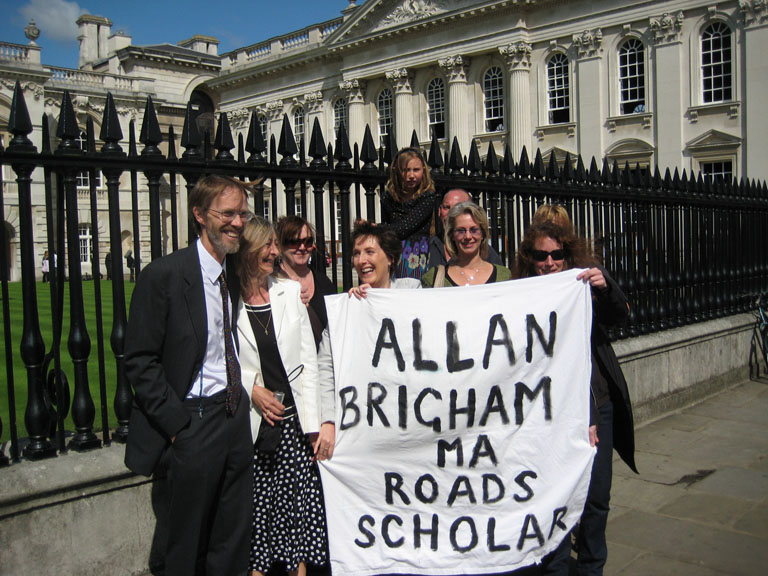
With friends outside the Senate House, 18 July 2009

In 2009, in recognition of his work as tour guide and local historian in the City of Cambridge, Brigham was awarded the Honorary Degree of Master of Arts by the University of Cambridge. The university noted his research on the history of brooms, the cinemas of Cambridge, Cambridge industrial history, and Cambridge working class holidays, and stated that: "Allan has been working with the University’s Community Affairs team for some time. He is a ‘critical friend’ reminding us that town-gown divisions do still exist in some measure, and advising the university on the best way to conquer these." He was pictured in The Daily Telegraph newspaper and interviewed by BBC News. Other distinguished people listed alongside the Cambridge street sweeper to receive honorary degrees in 2009 included Melinda Gates, Bill Gates, Shirley Williams, Peter Maxwell Davies, and the Aga Khan.

== Media work ==
Brigham was involved in television programmes about Cambridge; he made a series about the industrial history of Cambridge with Anglia TV, and helped make a BBC documentary with Rory McGrath about Hobson's Conduit watercourse.

He told his life story to Alan Macfarlane on 26 November 2013. (The text is transcribed from the collection "Filmed Interviews with Leading Thinkers" at the Museum of Archaeology and Anthropology, University of Cambridge.)

In September 2020, documentary maker Kip Loades published a short film of the life of Allan Brigham.

== Personal life ==
He married Janice Western, who survives him, in 1991. They met in 1978 while Allan was working at The Eagle pub.

== Memorial Bench ==
In November 2022, Piero D'Angelico of Mill Road Traders announced plans to situate benches in public gardens in Mill Road in memory of Brigham and Suzy Oakes, founder of Mill Road Winter Fair. D'Angelico said: "They were both extremely important to the area and I hope this is a meaningful way to remember them."

On 3 December 2022, about 70 people gathered to celebrate the installation of the bench, unveiled by Cambridge City Council and the Mill Road History Society, at the start of the Mill Road Winter Fair. Councillor Alex Collis said: "You couldn’t help but be drawn in by his love of Cambridge, and of the environment – I remember going on a fantastic bat safari with him around Romsey recreation ground. I am so pleased that we have been able to come together as a community to pay tribute to someone who gave so much to our city." Secretary of the history society Caro Wilson said: "Allan was a street sweeper, a shop steward, a local historian, tour guide and a community activist, and was very much loved by many people in Cambridge." Chair of the Museum of Cambridge Lucy Walker said: "Allan knew Cambridge and Mill Road like no one else. Allan wrote about sites and buildings on Mill Road, as part of the history project, and you can find all these now on the social history website, Capturing Cambridge, hosted by the Museum of Cambridge".
