= Romsey Mill =

Christian charity based in Cambridge, United Kingdom

Coordinates: 52.1973°N 0.1485°E

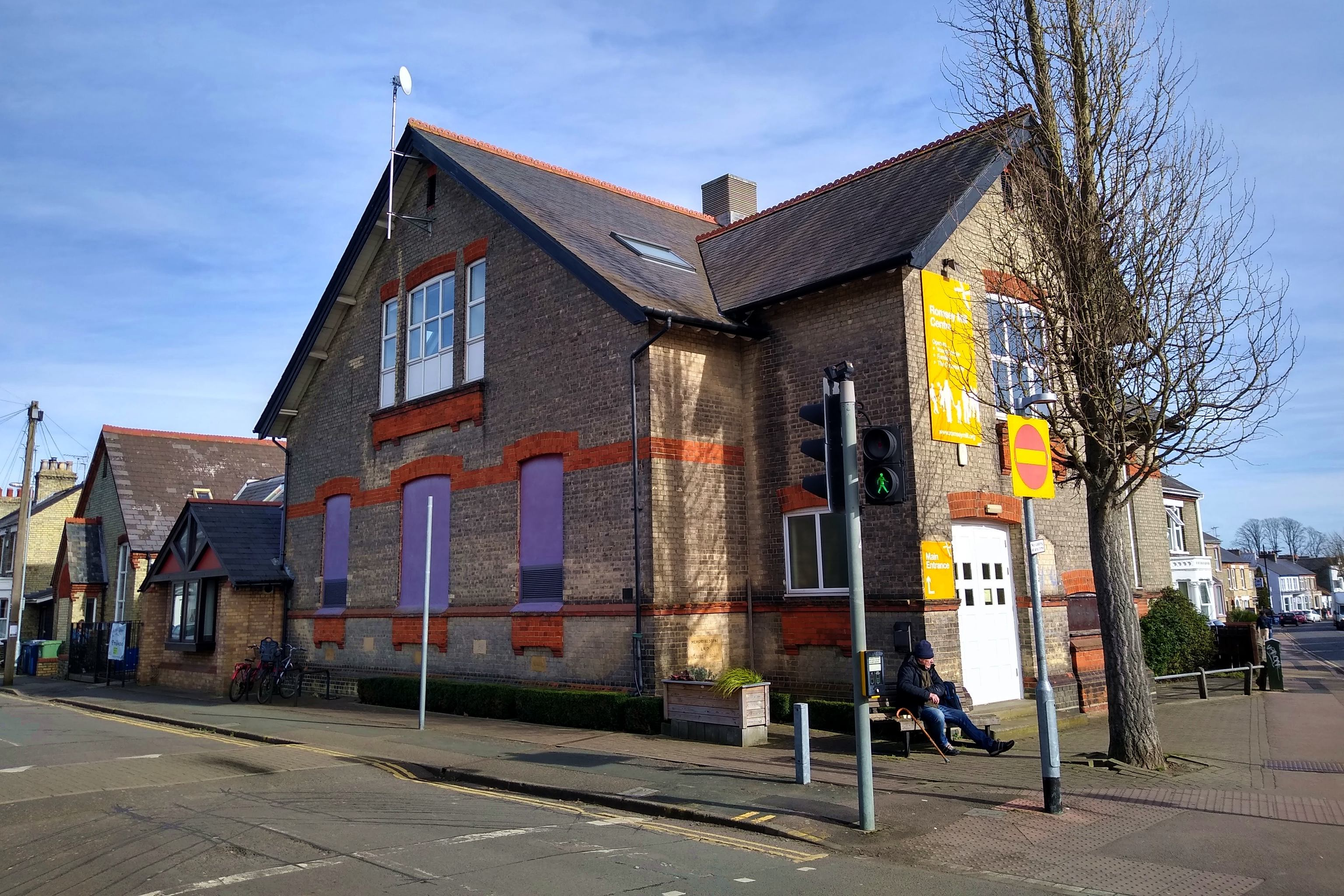
Romsey Mill Centre on Hemingford Road

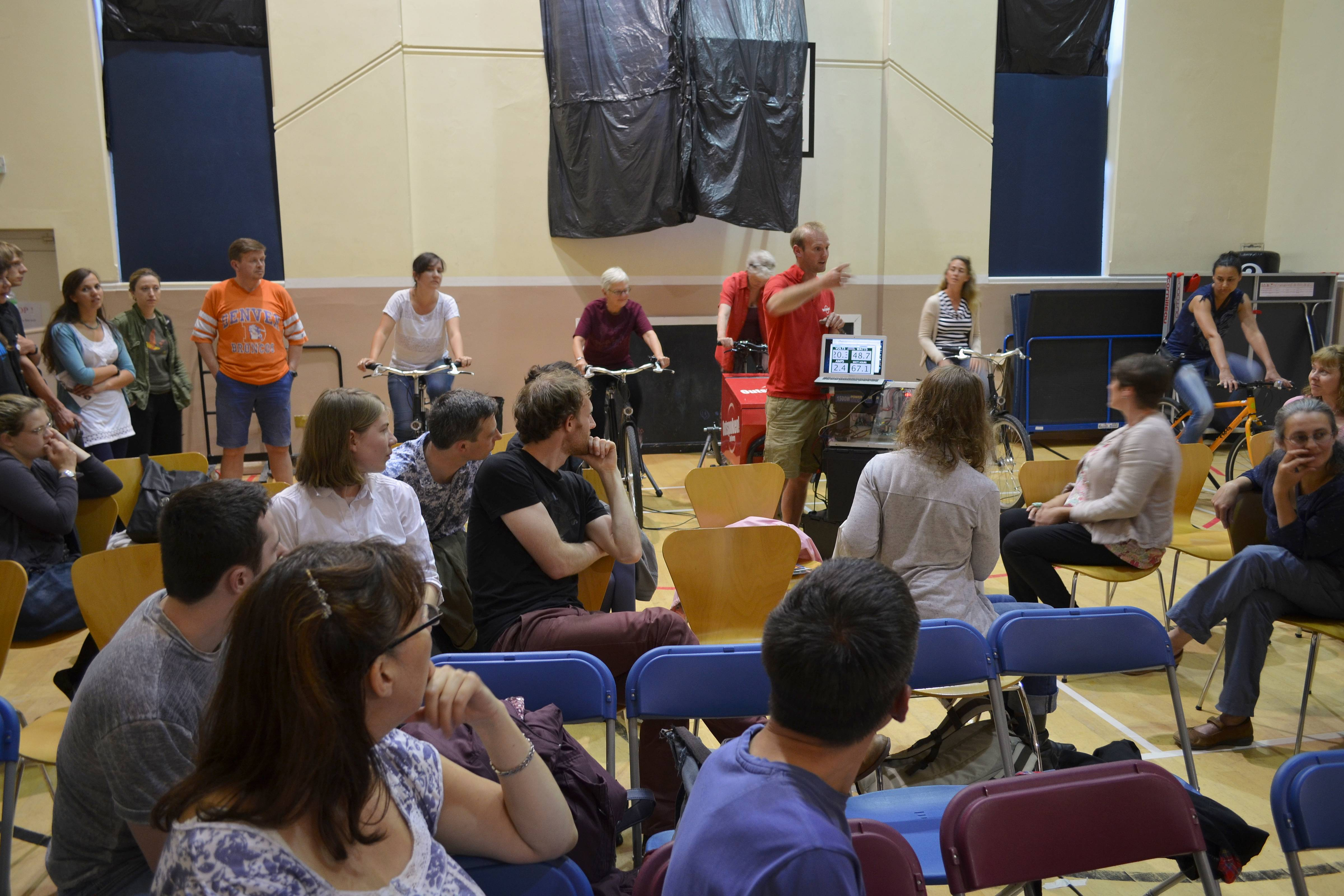
A pedal-powered screening of Les Triplettes de Belleville at Romsey Mill Centre

Romsey Mill is a Cambridgeshire-based charity supporting young people, children, and families, including young people with autism, teenage parents, and young people facing vulnerability or disadvantage.

The organisation provides programmes to enhance personal and social skills and assist in education and training. The Step-Up programme offers alternative education for 14- to 16-year-olds, and the Young Parents Programme delivers certified courses.

The Romsey Mill Centre in the Romsey Town area of Cambridge hosts various affiliated groups and community activities. After renovations, it was inaugurated in May 2007 by Dr. John Sentamu, then Archbishop of York.

== History ==
Founded in 1980 by five Cambridge churches, Romsey Mill, under the leadership of Rev Peter Phenna of St Martin's Church, sought to address the social needs of young people and families in the area. Recognising that many might not attend church services, the initiative aimed to serve them directly.

By 2011, the charity expanded its reach, serving approximately 2,600 young people and families annually. The charity now covers Cambridge and parts of South Cambridgeshire, using community venues like the Soul Centre in Cambourne. In 2009, Romsey Mill became a Children's Centre, offering Sure Start services to families with pre-school children.

Patrons of Romsey Mill include Hugh Duberly CBE, Colin Greenhalgh CBE DL, and Lady Wilson of Dinton.
