= Lamp trimmer =

Maintainer of ships' oil lamps

Lamp trimmer was a specialist position on board ships that involved maintaining oil lamps.

In the days when light came from burning oil in lamps, a vessel at sea needed crewmen to constantly care for the lamps. This care involved trimming the wick, which drew the oil up from the storage reservoir, so that the flame would be clean and bright. Lamp trimmers also refilled the reservoirs, which held enough oil for several hours of burning, but not enough to start a major fire if the lamp were to be knocked down or damaged somehow. As vessels became larger, the number of lamp trimmers increased significantly, because the only lighting below decks came from lamps. The position of lamp trimmer was so entrenched into marine tradition that electricians were called lamp trimmers for years after oil lamps had been completely replaced.

The skilled part of being a lamp trimmer was the ability to trim a wick in such a way that it would burn evenly, without hot spots, so that it would not need attention again for some time. A poorly trimmed wick creates a flame which is dim and smoky. A properly trimmed wick should come to a rounded point, or should be wedge shaped. When lit, the wick should burn cleanly all the way up to the highest flame it can make. The flame should be at least the width of the wick, and even, not ragged.
