= Circalit =

Online community

Circalit is an online community for writers, screenwriters, agents and producers. It mediates between industry professionals and individuals, and also provides a forum for writers to discuss each other's work. It was "[l]abeled as the first ever social networking site for screenwriters" by Movie Maker website, and dubbed the 'Facebook for screenwriters'. Recently, Circalit has partnered the website with The Script Factory, which has links to both Disney and Sony Pictures.

== History ==
Circalit was founded by a group of University College London students in February 2010. The CEO came up with the idea while working in a film production studio, noticing scripts he enjoyed that were ignored. In 2011 the company won the UCL Bright Ideas award.

== Competitions ==
Circalit holds competitions, many of which take place in conjunction with publishing companies, literary agents or film producers. Finished competitions have included both a Crime Fiction and a Short Story category done with Ether Books. Additionally the independent publishing company Little Episodes and Circalit jointly crowdsourced a short story on the subject of 'Broken Identities'. The publisher A. P. Watt linked up with the social networking site and its agents have attempted to read as many scripts as possible, with one manuscript winning a personal review by the publishers themselves. Alex Merkin hosted a screenplay competition with Circalit in which he reviewed the winning script.
