= Syria (ship) =

- Image of wreckage

History

United Kingdom
- Name: Syria
- Owner: Nourse Line
- Operator: Nourse Line
- Builder: William Pile of Sunderland
- Launched: 8 June 1868
- Fate: Wrecked 11 May 1884

General characteristics
- Class & type: Iron-hulled sailing ship
- Tonnage: 1,010 tons
- Length: 207.7 ft (63.3 m)
- Beam: 34.1 ft (10.4 m)
- Draught: 20.8 ft (6.3 m)

Syria was a 1,010-ton, iron sailing ship with a length of 207.7 feet (63.3 m), a breadth of 34.1 feet (10.4 m) and draught of 20.8 feet (6.3 m). She was built by William Pile of Sunderland for the Nourse Line, named after the Syria River in Karnataka, India and launched in 1868. She was primarily used for the transportation of Indian indentured labourers to the colonies.

== Voyages of the Syria ==
Details of some of these voyages are as follows:

Destination	Date of Arrival	Number of Passengers	Deaths During Voyage
Trinidad	2 January 1872	420	3
Trinidad	24 November 1873	412	23
Nevis	30 March 1874	315	n/a
Trinidad	28 January 1877	447	3
Trinidad	2 February 1878	474	11
Fiji	14 May 1884	438	59

== Destruction ==
The voyage to Fiji was the last for Syria as she ran aground on the Nasilai Reef, only four miles from shore, at 8.30 pm on 11 May 1884 with the loss of 59 lives. This was the worst maritime disaster in the history of Fiji. On this fateful voyage, the Syria left Calcutta on 13 March 1884 carrying 497 passengers. Its journey was uneventful except that the route, through the Indian Ocean and travelling south of Australia to utilise the prevailing winds, took only 58 days which was two weeks less than expected.

Five of the six lifeboats were destroyed by the heavy seas and on the sixth, four crew members went to look for assistance. They reached Nasilai village at dawn but their inability to communicate with the natives resulted in them being taken to Levuka instead of Suva. On reaching Levuka at 5 pm a rescue party was organised and they reached the stricken ship at 9 pm. Dr William MacGregor, the Chief Medical Officer and Acting Colonial Secretary, took charge of the rescue operations on the morning of 13 May. When the first rescue boats reached the scene, the majority of the passengers were in the water on the reef, making as far towards the land as they could, but a considerable number were still in the wrecked vessel, chiefly women and children. The ship lay on her port side. The masts were all broken into fragments, and sails, ropes, and debris of all kinds were mixed up and thrown about in the breakers in wild confusion.

The survivors were carried by boats and Fijian canoes to Nasilai village. The last rescue boat reached the village at 8 pm The next morning they were taken to Nasilai Immigration Depot and then to Nukulau. Fifty-six passengers and three crew members died in the wreck but a further eleven died in the next fortnight due to complications resulting from their experience.

On 29 June 2006, the Fiji Indian Association in Auckland (New Zealand) donated a 100-year-old tree root, recovered from the sea, to be placed in the crematorium foyer of the Memorial Gardens Crematorium in Manukau City. The artifact commemorates the ship Syria.

== See also ==
- Indian indenture system
- Indian Indenture Ships to Fiji
