= 1999 Cambridge City Council election =

1999 UK local government election

← 1998	6 May 1999	2000 →

14 out of 42 seats to Cambridge City Council 22 seats needed for a majority
- Turnout: 29.7% (▲1.9%)

	First party	Second party	Third party
Party	Labour	Liberal Democrats	Conservative
Last election	19 seats, 36.1%	17 seats, 39.3%	6 seats, 22.0%
Seats won	8	6	0
Seats after	19	17	6
Seat change	Steady	Steady	Steady
Popular vote	9,748	9,643	5,368
Percentage	38.1%	37.7%	21.0%
Swing	▲2.0%	▼1.6%	▼1.0%
- Winner of each seat at the 1999 Cambridge City Council election
Council control before election
No overall control
Council control after election
No overall control

The 1999 Cambridge City Council election took place on 6 May 1999 to elect members of Cambridge City Council in Cambridge, Cambridgeshire, England. This was on the same day as other local elections across England.

== Summary ==
=== Election result ===
1999 Cambridge City Council election
Party	This election			Full council			This election		
Party	Seats	Net	Seats %	Other	Total	Total %	Votes	Votes %	+/−
Labour	8	Steady	57.1	11	19	45.2	9,748	38.1	+2.0
Liberal Democrats	6	Steady	42.9	11	17	40.5	9,643	37.7	–1.6
Conservative	0	Steady	0.0	6	6	14.3	5,368	21.0	–1.0
Green	0	Steady	0.0	0	0	0.0	837	3.3	+0.7

== Ward results ==
=== Abbey ===
Abbey
Party	Candidate	Votes	%	±%
Labour	John Durrant*	702	71.3	+6.3
Conservative	Simon Mitton	157	16.0	–2.3
Liberal Democrats	Stephen Smith	76	7.7	–8.9
Green	John Collins	49	5.0	N/A
Majority		545	55.3	+8.6
Turnout		984	21.1	+2.1
Registered electors		4,679		
Labour hold		Swing	▲4.3	

=== Arbury ===
Arbury
Party	Candidate	Votes	%	±%
Labour	Robin Horne*	775	57.2	+4.0
Conservative	Mark Taylor	381	28.1	–3.0
Liberal Democrats	Rhodri James	198	14.6	–1.1
Majority		394	29.1	+7.0
Turnout		1,354	26.7	+1.5
Registered electors		5,118		
Labour hold		Swing	▲3.5	

=== Castle ===
Castle
Party	Candidate	Votes	%	±%
Liberal Democrats	David Howarth*	1,459	72.2	+11.8
Labour	Stephen Hartley	320	15.3	–3.0
Conservative	James Strachan	243	12.0	–3.1
Majority		1,139	56.3	+14.7
Turnout		2,022	28.9	+1.2
Registered electors		7,068		
Liberal Democrats hold		Swing	▲7.4	

=== Cherry Hinton ===
Cherry Hinton
Party	Candidate	Votes	%	±%
Labour	Robert Dryden*	1,264	53.0	+8.0
Conservative	Christopher Howell	989	41.4	–5.2
Liberal Democrats	France Amrani	134	5.6	–2.8
Majority		275	11.5	N/A
Turnout		2,387	43.1	+8.4
Registered electors		5,540		
Labour hold		Swing	▲6.6	

=== Coleridge ===
Coleridge
Party	Candidate	Votes	%	±%
Labour	Berni Callaghan	908	60.1	–1.6
Conservative	Fiona McNish	364	24.1	–1.5
Liberal Democrats	Richard Folley	239	15.8	+3.1
Majority		544	36.0	±0.0
Turnout		1,511	25.7	+1.9
Registered electors		5,896		
Labour hold		Swing	▼0.1	

=== East Chesterton ===
East Chesterton
Party	Candidate	Votes	%	±%
Labour	Patricia Johnston	1,121	44.9	+3.8
Liberal Democrats	Jennifer Liddle	1,049	42.0	–1.8
Conservative	Colin Havercroft	325	13.0	–1.7
Majority		72	2.9	N/A
Turnout		2,495	36.2	+4.1
Registered electors		6,927		
Labour gain from Liberal Democrats		Swing	▲3.0	

=== Kings Hedges ===
Kings Hedges
Party	Candidate	Votes	%	±%
Labour	Raith Overhill*	641	65.9	+0.8
Conservative	John Phillips	171	17.6	–1.2
Liberal Democrats	Philip Rodgers	161	16.5	+0.5
Majority		470	48.3	+2.0
Turnout		973	20.2	+0.4
Registered electors		4,808		
Labour hold		Swing	▲1.0	

=== Market ===
Market
Party	Candidate	Votes	%	±%
Liberal Democrats	Michael Dixon	818	54.0	–6.5
Labour	Andrew Jones	338	22.3	+1.5
Conservative	Jason Webb	198	13.1	+2.0
Green	Adam Swallow	162	10.7	+3.1
Majority		480	31.7	–8.0
Turnout		1,516	22.6	+1.5
Registered electors		6,743		
Liberal Democrats hold		Swing	▼4.0	

=== Newnham ===
Newnham
Party	Candidate	Votes	%	±%
Liberal Democrats	Nichola Harrison	1,109	54.9	–4.3
Labour	Edward Addison	634	31.4	+4.5
Conservative	Ann Watkins	278	13.8	±0.0
Majority		475	23.5	–8.8
Turnout		2,021	25.8	+3.5
Registered electors		7,912		
Liberal Democrats gain from Labour		Swing	▼4.4	

=== Petersfield ===
Petersfield
Party	Candidate	Votes	%	±%
Labour	Hannah Reed*	988	54.4	–0.7
Green	Shayne Mitchell	342	18.8	+3.0
Liberal Democrats	Jason McCullagh	259	14.3	–2.4
Conservative	Charles Harcourt	227	12.5	±0.0
Majority		646	35.6	–2.8
Turnout		1,816	25.1	+3.2
Registered electors		7,243		
Labour hold		Swing	▼1.9	

=== Queens Edith ===
Queens Edith
Party	Candidate	Votes	%	±%
Liberal Democrats	Ashley Woodford	1,175	48.7	–6.1
Conservative	Richard Williams	742	30.7	–0.8
Labour	Kira Davison	371	15.4	+1.7
Green	Robert Milsom	126	5.2	N/A
Majority		433	18.0	–5.3
Turnout		2,414	39.9	–1.8
Registered electors		6,061		
Liberal Democrats hold		Swing	▼2.7	

=== Romsey ===
Romsey
Party	Candidate	Votes	%	±%
Labour	Paul Gilchrist	1,015	50.2	+8.1
Liberal Democrats	Jane Tienne	889	43.9	–4.9
Conservative	Vivian Ellis	119	5.9	+2.2
Majority		126	6.2	N/A
Turnout		2,023	32.9	–1.0
Registered electors		6,176		
Labour hold		Swing	▲6.5	

=== Trumpington ===
Trumpington
Party	Candidate	Votes	%	±%
Liberal Democrats	Philippa Slatter*	1,205	52.2	+11.7
Conservative	Elaine Wheatley	937	40.6	–4.4
Labour	Denstone Kemp	168	7.3	–7.2
Majority		268	11.6	N/A
Turnout		2,310	38.6	+3.9
Registered electors		6,010		
Liberal Democrats hold		Swing	▲8.1	

=== West Chesterton ===
West Chesterton
Party	Candidate	Votes	%	±%
Liberal Democrats	Evelyn Knowles*	872	49.3	–2.1
Labour	Patrick Schicker	503	28.4	–0.4
Conservative	Richard Hoile	237	13.4	+1.1
Green	Jennifer Ward	158	8.9	N/A
Majority		369	20.8	–1.7
Turnout		1,770	29.5	–1.8
Registered electors		6,023		
Liberal Democrats hold		Swing	▼0.9	

== By-elections ==
=== Kings Hedges ===
Kings Hedges: February 2000
Party	Candidate	Votes	%	±%
Liberal Democrats	Rhodri James	723	44.5	+28.0
Labour	Stuart Newbold	540	33.2	–32.7
Conservative	Mark Taylor	312	19.2	+1.6
Green	Stephen Lawrence	51	3.1	N/A
Majority		183	11.3	N/A
Turnout		1,626		
Liberal Democrats gain from Labour		Swing	▲30.4	
