= 2000 Cambridge City Council election =

2000 UK local government election

← 1999	4 May 2000	2002 →

14 out of 42 seats to Cambridge City Council 22 seats needed for a majority
- Turnout: 29.6% (▼0.1%)

	First party	Second party	Third party
Party	Liberal Democrats	Labour	Conservative
Last election	17 seats, 37.7%	19 seats, 38.1%	6 seats, 21.0%
Seats won	9	4	1
Seats after	22	14	6
Seat change	▲4	▼4	Steady
Popular vote	9,994	8,602	6,142
Percentage	38.9%	33.4%	23.9%
Swing	▲1.2%	▼4.7%	▲2.9%
- Winner of each seat at the 2000 Cambridge City Council election
Council control before election
No overall control
Council control after election
Liberal Democrats

The 2000 Cambridge City Council election took place on 4 May 2000 to elect members of Cambridge City Council in Cambridge, Cambridgeshire, England. This was on the same day as other local elections across England.

== Summary ==
=== Election result ===
2000 Cambridge City Council election
Party	This election			Full council			This election		
Party	Seats	Net	Seats %	Other	Total	Total %	Votes	Votes %	+/−
Liberal Democrats	9	▲4	64.3	13	22	52.4	9,994	38.9	+1.2
Labour	4	▼4	28.6	10	14	33.3	8,602	33.4	–4.7
Conservative	1	Steady	7.1	5	6	14.3	6,142	23.9	+2.9
Green	0	Steady	0.0	0	0	0.0	985	3.8	+0.5

== Ward results ==
=== Abbey ===
Abbey
Party	Candidate	Votes	%	±%
Labour	Richard Smith*	567	62.4	–8.9
Conservative	Simon Mitton	224	24.7	+8.7
Liberal Democrats	Julian Huppert	117	12.9	+5.2
Majority		343	37.8	–17.5
Turnout		908	19.2	–1.9
Registered electors		4,764		
Labour hold		Swing	▼8.8	

=== Arbury ===
Arbury
Party	Candidate	Votes	%	±%
Liberal Democrats	Timothy Ward	691	35.5	+20.9
Labour	Patricia Wright*	655	33.6	–23.6
Conservative	Robert Boorman	544	27.9	–0.2
Green	Stephen Lawrence	57	2.9	N/A
Majority		36	1.8	N/A
Turnout		1,947	38.7	+12.0
Registered electors		5,045		
Liberal Democrats gain from Labour		Swing	▲22.3	

=== Castle ===
Castle
Party	Candidate	Votes	%	±%
Liberal Democrats	John Hipkin*	1,195	62.3	–9.9
Conservative	Mark Taylor	324	16.9	+4.9
Labour	Denstone Kemp	261	13.6	–1.7
Green	Margaret Wright	137	7.1	N/A
Majority		871	45.4	–10.9
Turnout		1,917	27.4	–1.5
Registered electors		7,015		
Liberal Democrats hold		Swing	▼7.4	

=== Cherry Hinton ===
Cherry Hinton
Party	Candidate	Votes	%	±%
Conservative	Christopher Howell	1,138	49.8	+8.4
Labour	George Rowling	994	43.5	–9.5
Liberal Democrats	Frances Amrani	152	6.7	+1.1
Majority		144	6.3	N/A
Turnout		2,284	41.9	–1.2
Registered electors		5,465		
Conservative gain from Labour		Swing	▲9.0	

=== Coleridge ===
Coleridge
Party	Candidate	Votes	%	±%
Labour	Jeremy Benstead*	789	52.6	–7.5
Conservative	James Strachan	433	28.8	+4.7
Liberal Democrats	Judith Pinnington	279	18.6	+2.8
Majority		356	23.7	–12.3
Turnout		1,501	25.3	–0.4
Registered electors		5,939		
Labour hold		Swing	▼6.1	

=== East Chesterton ===
East Chesterton
Party	Candidate	Votes	%	±%
Liberal Democrats	Jennifer Liddle	1,104	45.9	+3.9
Labour	Sarah Woodall	940	39.1	–5.8
Conservative	Colin Havercroft	361	15.0	+2.0
Majority		164	6.8	N/A
Turnout		2,405	34.6	–1.6
Registered electors		6,974		
Liberal Democrats hold		Swing	▲4.9	

=== Kings Hedges ===
Kings Hedges
Party	Candidate	Votes	%	±%
Labour	Peter Cowell*	644	64.3	–1.6
Conservative	Jason Webb	204	20.4	+2.8
Liberal Democrats	Philip Rodgers	153	15.3	–1.2
Majority		440	44.0	–4.3
Turnout		1,001	21.0	+0.8
Registered electors		4,774		
Labour hold		Swing	▼2.2	

=== Market ===
Market
Party	Candidate	Votes	%	±%
Liberal Democrats	Colin Rosenstiel*	835	54.6	+0.6
Labour	Andrew Jones	298	19.5	–2.8
Conservative	John Phillips	234	15.3	+2.2
Green	Adam Swallow	162	10.6	–0.1
Majority		537	35.1	+3.4
Turnout		1,529	22.4	–0.2
Registered electors		6,854		
Liberal Democrats hold		Swing	▲1.7	

=== Newnham ===
Newnham
Party	Candidate	Votes	%	±%
Liberal Democrats	Malcolm Schofield	1,016	53.1	–1.8
Labour	Gillian Richardson*	540	28.2	–3.2
Conservative	Ann Watkins	358	18.7	+4.9
Majority		476	24.9	+1.4
Turnout		1,914	24.7	–2.1
Registered electors		7,863		
Liberal Democrats gain from Labour		Swing	▲0.7	

=== Petersfield ===
Petersfield
Party	Candidate	Votes	%	±%
Labour	Benjamin Bradnack*	896	49.7	–4.7
Green	Shayne Mitchell	391	21.7	+2.9
Liberal Democrats	Kevin Wilkins	267	14.8	+0.5
Conservative	Charles Harcourt	249	13.8	+1.3
Majority		505	28.0	–7.6
Turnout		1,803	23.5	–1.6
Registered electors		7,710		
Labour hold		Swing	▼3.8	

=== Queens Edith ===
Queens Edith
Party	Candidate	Votes	%	±%
Liberal Democrats	Richard Stebbings	1,282	54.9	+6.2
Conservative	Hilary Pennington	711	30.5	–0.2
Labour	Louise Downham	341	14.6	–0.8
Majority		571	24.5	+6.5
Turnout		2,334	38.6	–1.3
Registered electors		6,064		
Liberal Democrats gain from Conservative		Swing	▲3.2	

=== Romsey ===
Romsey
Party	Candidate	Votes	%	±%
Liberal Democrats	Sarah Ellis-Miller	951	45.0	+1.1
Labour	Adrian Lucas*	900	42.6	–7.6
Conservative	Vivian Ellis	134	6.3	+0.4
Green	Robert Milsom	126	5.4	N/A
Majority		51	2.4	N/A
Turnout		2,111	34.6	
Registered electors		6,133		
Liberal Democrats gain from Labour		Swing	▲4.4	

=== Trumpington ===
Trumpington
Party	Candidate	Votes	%	±%
Liberal Democrats	Jean Currie	1,096	49.0	–3.2
Conservative	Fiona McNish	925	41.4	+0.8
Labour	Maria Bell	216	9.7	+2.4
Majority		171	7.6	–4.0
Turnout		2,111	37.9	–0.7
Registered electors		5,908		
Liberal Democrats hold		Swing	▼2.0	

=== West Chesterton ===
West Chesterton
Party	Candidate	Votes	%	±%
Liberal Democrats	Gaynor Griffiths*	856	46.7	–2.6
Labour	David Gosling	561	30.6	+2.2
Conservative	Richard Hoile	303	16.5	+3.1
Green	Gerhard Goldbeck-Wood	112	6.1	–2.8
Majority		295	16.1	–4.7
Turnout		1,832	30.2	+0.7
Registered electors		6,065		
Liberal Democrats hold		Swing	▼2.4	
