= 1996 Cambridge City Council election =

1996 UK local government election

← 1995	2 May 1996	1998 →

14 out of 42 seats to Cambridge City Council 22 seats needed for a majority
- Turnout: 35.9% (▼3.6%)

	First party	Second party	Third party
Party	Labour	Liberal Democrats	Conservative
Last election	18 seats, 45.3%	17 seats, 37.1%	4 seats, 15.6%
Seats won	8	5	1
Seats after	21	17	4
Seat change	▲3	Steady	▼3
Popular vote	13,852	10,848	6,086
Percentage	45.0%	35.2%	19.8%
Swing	▼0.3%	▼1.9%	▲4.2%
- Winner of each seat at the 1996 Cambridge City Council election
Council control before election
No overall control
Council control after election
No overall control

The 1996 Cambridge City Council election took place on 2 May 1996 to elect members of Cambridge City Council in Cambridge, Cambridgeshire, England. This was on the same day as other local elections across England.

== Summary ==
=== Election result ===
1996 Cambridge City Council election
Party	This election			Full council			This election		
Party	Seats	Net	Seats %	Other	Total	Total %	Votes	Votes %	+/−
Labour	8	▲3	57.1	13	21	50.0	13,852	45.0	–0.3
Liberal Democrats	5	Steady	35.7	12	17	40.5	10,848	35.2	–1.9
Conservative	1	▼3	7.1	3	4	9.5	6,086	19.8	+4.2

== Ward results ==
=== Abbey ===
Abbey
Party	Candidate	Votes	%	±%
Labour	Richard Smith*	882	71.5	–6.9
Conservative	Simon Mitton	200	16.2	N/A
Liberal Democrats	Stephanie Langton	151	12.2	–9.4
Majority		682	55.3	–1.4
Turnout		1,233	25.4	–1.0
Registered electors		4,858		
Labour hold				

=== Arbury ===
Arbury
Party	Candidate	Votes	%	±%
Labour	Patricia Wright	1,063	54.9	–6.3
Conservative	Vivian Ellis*	670	34.6	+11.9
Liberal Democrats	Adrian Wrigley	205	10.6	–5.5
Majority		393	20.3	–18.2
Turnout		1,938	36.8	±0.0
Registered electors		5,250		
Labour gain from Conservative		Swing	▼9.1	

=== Castle ===
Castle
Party	Candidate	Votes	%	±%
Liberal Democrats	John Hipkin*	1,421	55.8	+1.7
Labour	Robert Smith	684	26.9	+0.7
Conservative	Jacqueline Mitton	441	17.3	+2.0
Majority		737	28.9	+1.0
Turnout		2,546	36.1	–1.3
Registered electors		7,013		
Liberal Democrats hold		Swing	▲0.5	

=== Cherry Hinton ===
Cherry Hinton
Party	Candidate	Votes	%	±%
Labour	Geoffrey Howe	1,022	55.4	–7.9
Conservative	Eric Barrett-Payton	510	27.6	+1.8
Liberal Democrats	Edna Howarth	313	17.0	+6.0
Majority		512	27.8	–9.7
Turnout		1,845	32.9	–10.2
Registered electors		5,516		
Labour gain from Conservative		Swing	▼4.9	

=== Coleridge ===
Coleridge
Party	Candidate	Votes	%	±%
Labour	Jeremy Benstead*	1,234	62.1	+3.8
Conservative	Pamela Axhorn	500	25.2	+3.2
Liberal Democrats	Evelyn Corder	254	12.8	–7.0
Majority		734	36.9	+0.6
Turnout		1,988	33.3	–3.7
Registered electors		5,944		
Labour hold		Swing	▲0.3	

=== East Chesterton ===
East Chesterton
Party	Candidate	Votes	%	±%
Liberal Democrats	Joe Nunes*	1,271	44.1	–3.1
Labour	Stephen Hartley	1,249	43.3	+1.7
Conservative	Colin Havercroft	365	12.7	+1.6
Majority		22	0.8	–4.8
Turnout		2,885	41.5	–2.0
Registered electors		6,906		
Liberal Democrats hold		Swing	▼2.4	

=== Kings Hedges ===
Kings Hedges
Party	Candidate	Votes	%	±%
Labour	Peter Cowell*	1,116	77.0	–0.2
Conservative	Stephen George	197	13.6	N/A
Liberal Democrats	Rhodri James	136	9.4	–5.9
Majority		919	63.4	+1.5
Turnout		1,449	29.5	
Registered electors		4,904		
Labour hold				

=== Market ===
Market
Party	Candidate	Votes	%	±%
Liberal Democrats	Colin Rosenstiel*	1,196	55.9	+5.5
Labour	Eleanor Flood	719	33.6	–0.4
Conservative	Alexandra Hardie	223	10.4	+0.5
Majority		477	22.3	+5.9
Turnout		2,138	32.6	–2.5
Registered electors		6,579		
Liberal Democrats hold		Swing	▲3.0	

=== Newnham ===
Newnham
Party	Candidate	Votes	%	±%
Labour	Gillian Richardson	1,282	45.3	–3.6
Liberal Democrats	Joyce Baird*	1,249	44.1	+3.6
Conservative	Caroline Turnbull	301	10.6	±0.0
Majority		33	1.2	–7.3
Turnout		2,832	35.3	–3.3
Registered electors		8,026		
Labour gain from Liberal Democrats		Swing	▼3.6	

=== Petersfield ===
Petersfield
Party	Candidate	Votes	%	±%
Labour	Benjamin Bradnack*	1,456	62.4	+14.4
Liberal Democrats	Simon Goddard	585	25.1	–10.5
Conservative	Peter Welton	294	12.6	+2.9
Majority		871	37.3	+23.9
Turnout		2,335	33.6	–4.8
Registered electors		6,913		
Labour hold		Swing	▲12.5	

=== Queens Edith ===
Queens Edith
Party	Candidate	Votes	%	±%
Conservative	Graham Edwards*	1,138	37.7	+11.9
Liberal Democrats	Ashley Woodford	1,120	37.1	–10.2
Labour	John Beresford	759	25.2	–1.1
Majority		18	0.5	N/A
Turnout		3,017	50.6	+0.4
Registered electors		5.884		
Conservative hold		Swing	▲11.1	

=== Romsey ===
Romsey
Party	Candidate	Votes	%	±%
Labour	Adrian Lucas	1,184	55.5	+2.3
Liberal Democrats	Catherine Smart	840	39.4	+3.8
Conservative	Ann Watkins	109	5.1	–0.6
Majority		344	16.1	–1.5
Turnout		2,133	35.5	–3.7
Registered electors		6,000		
Labour hold		Swing	▼0.8	

=== Trumpington ===
Trumpington
Party	Candidate	Votes	%	±%
Liberal Democrats	Hazel Eagle	886	41.2	–3.9
Conservative	Sonja Froggett*	815	37.9	+3.6
Labour	Kira Davison	447	20.8	+0.3
Majority		71	3.3	–7.6
Turnout		2,146	34.8	–3.5
Registered electors		6,092		
Liberal Democrats gain from Conservative		Swing	▼3.8	

=== West Chesterton ===
West Chesterton
Party	Candidate	Votes	%	±%
Liberal Democrats	Gaynor Griffiths*	1,221	53.1	+3.6
Labour	Ben Wardle	755	32.8	–3.4
Conservative	Graham Stuart	323	14.0	–0.3
Majority		466	20.3	+7.0
Turnout		2,299	38.8	–4.5
Registered electors		5,883		
Liberal Democrats hold		Swing	▲3.5	
