= 1991 Cambridge City Council election =

1991 UK local government election

← 1990	2 May 1991	1992 →

14 out of 42 seats to Cambridge City Council 22 seats needed for a majority
- Turnout: 44.5% (▼5.8%)

	First party	Second party	Third party
Party	Labour	Conservative	Liberal Democrats
Last election	22 seats, 45.6%	14 seats, 27.3%	6 seats, 19.1%
Seats won	7	3	4
Seats after	23	13	6
Seat change	▲1	▼1	Steady
Popular vote	13,480	11,202	9,933
Percentage	37.5%	31.1%	27.6%
Swing	▼8.1%	▲3.8%	▲8.5%
- Winner of each seat at the 1991 Cambridge City Council election
Council control before election
Labour
Council control after election
Labour

The 1991 Cambridge City Council election took place on 2 May 1991 to elect members of Cambridge City Council in Cambridge, Cambridgeshire, England. This was on the same day as other local elections across England.

== Summary ==
=== Election result ===
1991 Cambridge City Council election
Party	This election			Full council			This election		
Party	Seats	Net	Seats %	Other	Total	Total %	Votes	Votes %	+/−
Labour	7	▲1	50.0	16	23	54.8	13,480	37.5	–8.1
Conservative	3	▼1	21.4	10	13	31.0	11,202	31.1	+3.8
Liberal Democrats	4	Steady	28.6	2	6	14.3	9,933	27.6	+8.5
Green	0	Steady	0.0	0	0	0.0	1,349	3.8	–4.2

== Ward results ==
=== Abbey ===
Abbey
Party	Candidate	Votes	%	±%
Labour	John Durrant*	1,050	61.4	–5.6
Conservative	Robert Marven	418	24.4	+3.6
Liberal Democrats	Brian Whitt	169	9.9	+4.4
Green	Phillipa Bryan	74	4.3	–2.4
Majority		632	36.9	–9.2
Turnout		1,711	36.4	–6.3
Registered electors		4,705		
Labour hold		Swing	▼4.6	

=== Arbury ===
Arbury
Party	Candidate	Votes	%	±%
Labour	Sandra Wilson	1,034	48.0	–6.4
Conservative	Vivian Ellis	655	30.4	+2.6
Liberal Democrats	Evelyn Corder	466	21.6	+9.7
Majority		379	17.6	–9.0
Turnout		2,155	41.2	–6.4
Registered electors		5,230		
Labour hold		Swing	▼4.5	

=== Castle ===
Castle
Party	Candidate	Votes	%	±%
Liberal Democrats	David Howarth*	1,565	50.3	+16.7
Conservative	Richard Baty	930	29.9	+0.9
Labour	Kevin Price	616	19.8	–10.1
Majority		635	20.4	+16.7
Turnout		3,111	50.9	–4.6
Registered electors		6,111		
Liberal Democrats hold		Swing	▲7.9	

=== Cherry Hinton ===
Cherry Hinton
Party	Candidate	Votes	%	±%
Conservative	Stephen Hillier	1,182	44.4	+12.7
Labour	Anthony Schofield	1,150	43.2	–10.7
Liberal Democrats	Kevin Wilkins	332	12.5	+5.9
Majority		32	1.2	N/A
Turnout		2,664	49.0	–2.6
Registered electors		5,433		
Conservative hold		Swing	▲11.7	

=== Coleridge ===
Coleridge
Party	Candidate	Votes	%	±%
Labour	Paul Diamond	1,320	48.2	–6.6
Conservative	Audrey Hall	1,011	37.0	+5.5
Liberal Democrats	Stephen Howarth	290	10.6	+3.0
Green	Yvonne Douglas	115	4.2	–1.9
Majority		309	11.3	N/A
Turnout		2,736	47.8	–4.2
Registered electors		5,729		
Labour hold		Swing	▼6.1	

=== East Chesterton ===
East Chesterton
Party	Candidate	Votes	%	±%
Liberal Democrats	Roman Znajek	1,083	33.7	+11.4
Conservative	Patrick Harding	1,033	32.1	+3.4
Labour	Andrew Milbourn	1,008	31.3	–12.3
Green	Peter Pope	94	2.9	–2.5
Majority		50	1.6	N/A
Turnout		3,218	51.1	–3.5
Registered electors		6,299		
Liberal Democrats gain from Conservative		Swing	▲4.0	

=== Kings Hedges ===
Kings Hedges
Party	Candidate	Votes	%	±%
Labour	Kevin Southernwood	999	57.3	–4.2
Conservative	Geoffrey Howe	465	26.7	+8.8
Liberal Democrats	Stephen Warde	279	16.0	+2.3
Majority		534	30.6	–13.0
Turnout		1,743	34.4	–6.1
Registered electors		5,073		
Labour hold		Swing	▼6.5	

=== Market ===
Market
Party	Candidate	Votes	%	±%
Liberal Democrats	Andrew Lake	1,344	49.5	+8.4
Labour	Kevin Blencowe	821	30.3	–7.6
Conservative	Martin Graham	353	13.0	+1.5
Green	Timothy Cooper	196	7.2	–2.3
Majority		523	19.3	+16.1
Turnout		2,714	45.2	–8.2
Registered electors		6,005		
Liberal Democrats hold		Swing	▲8.0	

=== Newnham ===
Newnham
Party	Candidate	Votes	%	±%
Labour	Daphne Roper	1,010	33.2	–13.3
Conservative	Kenneth Wheatcroft	896	29.5	+5.1
Liberal Democrats	Pamela Strachan	857	28.2	+10.5
Green	Margaret Wright	278	9.1	–2.2
Majority		114	3.7	–18.4
Turnout		3,041	41.6	–6.0
Registered electors		7,306		
Labour gain from Liberal Democrats		Swing	▼9.2	

=== Petersfield ===
Petersfield
Party	Candidate	Votes	%	±%
Labour	Beth Scott	1,358	56.5	–8.7
Conservative	Peter Welton	464	19.3	+2.0
Liberal Democrats	Andrew Paton	344	14.3	=5.0
Green	Guy Grimley	236	9.8	–2.7
Majority		894	37.2	–6.4
Turnout		2,402	38.8	–7.8
Registered electors		6,194		
Labour hold		Swing	▼3.2	

=== Queens Edith ===
Queens Edith
Party	Candidate	Votes	%	±%
Conservative	George Reid*	1,381	46.7	+2.6
Liberal Democrats	Tricia Charlesworth	867	29.3	+2.4
Labour	Janice Auton	711	24.0	–3.0
Majority		514	17.4	+4.4
Turnout		2,959	52.1	–5.5
Registered electors		5,683		
Conservative hold		Swing	▲0.1	

=== Romsey ===
Romsey
Party	Candidate	Votes	%	±%
Labour	Simon Sedgwick-Jell*	1,111	52.3	–8.2
Liberal Democrats	Thomas Timmons	413	19.5	+5.5
Conservative	Jason Webb	376	17.8	+3.2
Green	Ian Miller	217	10.3	–0.5
Majority		698	33.0	–13.1
Turnout		2,117	39.2	–6.0
Registered electors		5,395		
Labour hold		Swing	▼6.9	

=== Trumpington ===
Trumpington
Party	Candidate	Votes	%	±%
Conservative	Justin Coleman	1,235	48.9	+8.2
Liberal Democrats	Phillipa Slatter	682	27.0	+2.0
Labour	Andrew Powell	469	18.6	–6.6
Green	David Rees	139	5.5	–3.5
Majority		553	21.9	+6.4
Turnout		2,525	41.0	–5.2
Registered electors		6,155		
Conservative hold		Swing	▲3.1	

=== West Chesterton ===
West Chesterton
Party	Candidate	Votes	%	±%
Liberal Democrats	Evelyn Knowles*	1,242	43.3	+11.7
Labour	Paul McHugh	823	28.7	–2.6
Conservative	Michael Farrington	803	28.0	–1.6
Majority		419	13.3	+12.9
Turnout		2,868	52.2	–4.3
Registered electors		5,496		
Liberal Democrats hold		Swing	▲7.2	
