= 1995 Cambridge City Council election =

1995 UK local government election

← 1994	5 May 1995	1996 →

14 out of 42 seats to Cambridge City Council 22 seats needed for a majority
- Turnout: 39.5% (▼4.6%)

	First party	Second party	Third party
Party	Labour	Liberal Democrats	Conservative
Last election	17 seats, 41.0%	15 seats, 39.1%	10 seats, 19.5%
Seats won	8	6	0
Seats after	18	17	7
Seat change	▲1	▲2	▼3
Popular vote	14,733	12,042	5,077
Percentage	45.3%	37.1%	15.6%
Swing	▲4.3%	▼2.0%	▼3.9%
- Winner of each seat at the 1995 Cambridge City Council election
Council control before election
No overall control
Council control after election
No overall control

The 1995 Cambridge City Council election took place on 4 May 1995 to elect members of Cambridge City Council in Cambridge, Cambridgeshire, England. This was on the same day as other local elections across England.

== Summary ==
=== Election result ===
1995 Cambridge City Council election
Party	This election			Full council			This election		
Party	Seats	Net	Seats %	Other	Total	Total %	Votes	Votes %	+/−
Labour	8	▲1	57.1	10	18	42.9	14,733	45.3	+4.3
Liberal Democrats	6	▲2	42.9	11	17	40.5	12,042	37.1	–2.0
Conservative	0	▼3	0.0	7	7	16.7	5,077	15.6	–3.9
Green	0	Steady	0.0	0	0	0.0	509	1.6	+1.3
Natural Law	0	Steady	0.0	0	0	0.0	33	0.1	N/A

== Ward results ==
=== Abbey ===
Abbey
Party	Candidate	Votes	%	±%
Labour	John Durrant*	988	78.4	+12.2
Liberal Democrats	Stephanie Langton	273	21.6	+5.2
Majority		715	56.7	+7.8
Turnout		1,261	26.4	–4.3
Registered electors		4,873		
Labour hold		Swing	▲3.5	

=== Arbury ===
Arbury
Party	Candidate	Votes	%	±%
Labour	Robin Horne	1,180	61.2	+7.9
Conservative	Stephen George	438	22.7	–3.2
Liberal Democrats	Adrian Weigley	310	16.1	–4.7
Majority		742	38.5	+11.1
Turnout		1,928	36.8	–6.5
Registered electors		5,250		
Labour hold		Swing	▲5.6	

=== Castle ===
Castle
Party	Candidate	Votes	%	±%
Liberal Democrats	David Howarth*	1,459	54.1	+1.2
Labour	Robert Smith	690	26.2	+1.1
Conservative	Adam Nichols	402	15.3	–6.6
Green	Lydia Howitt	118	4.5	N/A
Majority		736	27.9	–0.9
Turnout		2,669	37.4	–9.4
Registered electors		5,160		
Liberal Democrats hold		Swing	▲0.1	

=== Cherry Hinton ===
Cherry Hinton
Party	Candidate	Votes	%	±%
Labour	Robert Dryden	1,478	63.3	+10.8
Conservative	Eric Barrett-Payton	602	25.8	–7.7
Liberal Democrats	Ashley Woodford	256	11.0	–3.0
Majority		876	37.5	+18.5
Turnout		2,336	43.1	–6.2
Registered electors		5,416		
Labour gain from Conservative		Swing	▲9.3	

=== Coleridge ===
Coleridge
Party	Candidate	Votes	%	±%
Labour	Raith Overhill	1,260	58.3	–2.7
Conservative	Jeremy Froggett	475	22.0	–2.0
Liberal Democrats	Tricia Charlesworth	427	19.8	+4.7
Majority		785	36.3	–0.7
Turnout		2,162	37.0	–7.4
Registered electors		5,849		
Labour hold		Swing	▼0.4	

=== East Chesterton ===
East Chesterton
Party	Candidate	Votes	%	±%
Liberal Democrats	Roman Znajek*	1,412	47.2	+1.2
Labour	Stephen Hartley	1,244	41.6	+2.4
Conservative	Colin Havercroft	333	11.1	–3.7
Majority		168	5.6	–1.2
Turnout		2,989	43.5	–2.1
Registered electors		6,873		
Liberal Democrats hold		Swing	▼0.6	

=== Kings Hedges ===
Kings Hedges
Party	Candidate	Votes	%	±%
Labour	Kevin Southernwood*	1,100	77.2	+12.4
Liberal Democrats	Evelyn Corder	218	15.3	–5.0
Independent	Stephen Ryder	107	7.5	N/A
Majority		882	61.9	+17.4
Turnout		1,425	28.9	–2.4
Registered electors		4,945		
Labour hold		Swing	▲8.7	

=== Market ===
Market
Party	Candidate	Votes	%	±%
Liberal Democrats	Andrew Lake*	1,125	50.4	–10.6
Labour	Carol Atack	759	34.0	+6.6
Conservative	James Strachan	221	9.9	–1.7
Green	Lois Hickey	127	5.7	N/A
Majority		366	16.4	–17.1
Turnout		2,232	35.1	–5.4
Registered electors		6,391		
Liberal Democrats hold		Swing	▼8.6	

=== Newnham ===
Newnham
Party	Candidate	Votes	%	±%
Labour	Daphne Roper*	1,391	48.9	+8.1
Liberal Democrats	Malcolm Schofield	1,150	40.5	–6.2
Conservative	Jason Webb	301	10.6	–1.9
Majority		241	8.5	N/A
Turnout		2,842	38.6	–4.5
Registered electors		7,414		
Labour hold		Swing	▲7.2	

=== Petersfield ===
Petersfield
Party	Candidate	Votes	%	±%
Labour	Colin Rodgers	1,259	48.0	–0.7
Liberal Democrats	Catherine Bowden	915	35.6	–4.6
Conservative	Peter Welton	249	9.7	–0.5
Green	Margaret Wright	150	5.8	N/A
Majority		344	13.4	+3.9
Turnout		2,842	38.4	–6.0
Registered electors		6,686		
Labour hold		Swing	▲2.0	

=== Queens Edith ===
Queens Edith
Party	Candidate	Votes	%	±%
Liberal Democrats	Anthony Mills	1,388	47.3	–3.8
Labour	John Beresford	771	26.3	+4.8
Conservative	Alexandra Hardie	755	25.8	–1.6
Natural Law	Luke Leighton	18	0.6	N/A
Majority		617	21.0	–2.7
Turnout		2,932	50.2	–7.8
Registered electors		5,854		
Liberal Democrats gain from Conservative		Swing	▼4.3	

=== Romsey ===
Romsey
Party	Candidate	Votes	%	±%
Labour	David Baxter	1,238	53.2	+2.6
Liberal Democrats	Catherine Smart	829	35.6	–3.4
Conservative	Adam Cannon	133	5.7	–0.3
Green	Ian Miller	114	4.9	+0.5
Natural Law	Patrice Gladwin	15	0.6	N/A
Majority		409	17.6	+6.0
Turnout		2,329	39.2	–7.6
Registered electors		5,961		
Labour hold		Swing	▲3.0	

=== Trumpington ===
Trumpington
Party	Candidate	Votes	%	±%
Liberal Democrats	Philippa Slatter	1,056	45.2	–1.0
Conservative	Margaret Hoskins	802	34.3	–4.0
Labour	Robert Hardy	480	20.5	+5.0
Majority		254	10.9	+3.0
Turnout		2,338	38.3	–5.4
Registered electors		6,120		
Liberal Democrats gain from Conservative		Swing	▲1.5	

=== West Chesterton ===
West Chesterton
Party	Candidate	Votes	%	±%
Liberal Democrats	Evelyn Knowles*	1,224	49.5	–0.5
Labour	Christine Mann	895	36.2	–0.6
Conservative	Graham Stuart	355	14.3	+1.1
Majority		329	13.3	+0.1
Turnout		2,474	43.3	–4.5
Registered electors		5,720		
Liberal Democrats hold		Swing	▲0.1	
