= 1984 Cambridge City Council election =

1984 English local election

← 1983	3 May 1984	1986 →

14 out of 42 seats to Cambridge City Council 22 seats needed for a majority
- Turnout: 47.7% (▼3.2%)

	First party	Second party	Third party
Party	Labour	Conservative	Alliance
Last election	21 seats, 35.9%	12 seats, 35.2%	9 seats, 28.6%
Seats won	7	3	4
Seats after	21	12	9
Seat change	Steady	▼1	▲1
Popular vote	14,405	12,317	10,984
Percentage	37.9%	32.4%	28.9%
Swing	▲2.0%	▼2.8%	▲0.3%
- Winner of each seat at the 1984 Cambridge City Council election
Council control before election
No overall control
Council control after election
No overall control

The 1984 Cambridge City Council election took place on 3 May 1984 to elect members of Cambridge City Council in Cambridge, Cambridgeshire, England. This was on the same day as other local elections across England.

== Summary ==
=== Election result ===
1984 Cambridge City Council election
Party	This election			Full council			This election		
Party	Seats	Net	Seats %	Other	Total	Total %	Votes	Votes %	+/−
Labour	7	Steady	50.0	14	21	50.0	14,405	37.9	+2.0
Conservative	3	▼1	21.4	9	12	28.6	12,317	32.4	–2.8
Alliance	4	▲1	28.6	5	9	21.4	10,984	28.9	+0.3
Ecology	0	Steady	0.0	0	0	0.0	286	0.8	+0.6

== Ward results ==
=== Abbey ===
Abbey
Party	Candidate	Votes	%	±%
Labour	Richard Smith*	1,208	62.3	+0.4
Conservative	Peter Day	550	28.4	+2.5
SDP (Alliance)	Don McBey	182	9.4	–2.8
Majority		658	33.9	–2.1
Turnout		1,940	41.2	+0.6
Registered electors		4,707		
Labour hold		Swing	▼1.1	

=== Arbury ===
Arbury
Party	Candidate	Votes	%	±%
Labour	Elizabeth Gard*	1,093	46.8	–0.3
Conservative	Susan Pilkington	741	31.7	–0.5
SDP (Alliance)	Peter Warner	501	21.5	+0.9
Majority		352	15.1	+0.2
Turnout		2,335	43.1	–8.4
Registered electors		5,420		
Labour hold		Swing	▲0.1	

=== Castle ===
Castle
Party	Candidate	Votes	%	±%
Liberal (Alliance)	Alan Charlesworth*	1,261	44.3	–1.6
Conservative	Kate French	948	33.3	–1.4
Labour	Mark Adams	637	22.4	+2.9
Majority		313	11.0	–0.2
Turnout		2,846	48.7	–4.4
Registered electors		5,847		
Liberal hold		Swing	▲0.1	

=== Cherry Hinton ===
Cherry Hinton
Party	Candidate	Votes	%	±%
Labour	John Woodhouse*	1,389	49.1	+3.1
Conservative	Rowena Davies	846	29.9	–1.6
SDP (Alliance)	June Greenwell	592	20.9	–1.5
Majority		543	19.2	+4.7
Turnout		2,827	52.9	–6.4
Registered electors		5,370		
Labour hold		Swing	▲2.4	

=== Coleridge ===
Coleridge
Party	Candidate	Votes	%	±%
Labour	Mark Todd*	1,538	48.7	+5.5
Conservative	Ian Cornwell	1,255	39.7	–4.5
Liberal (Alliance)	Simon Lavery	367	11.6	–1.0
Majority		283	9.0	N/A
Turnout		3,160	57.0	+1.5
Registered electors		5,546		
Labour hold		Swing	▲5.0	

=== East Chesterton ===
East Chesterton
Party	Candidate	Votes	%	±%
Conservative	Stephen George	1,355	43.4	+2.4
Labour	Vivien Allum	1,063	34.0	–0.7
SDP (Alliance)	Marion Simpson	705	22.6	–1.8
Majority		292	9.3	+3.0
Turnout		3,123	50.3	–2.3
Registered electors		6,214		
Conservative hold		Swing	▲1.6	

=== Kings Hedges ===
Kings Hedges
Party	Candidate	Votes	%	±%
Labour	Peter Cowell*	1,188	55.9	+6.4
Liberal (Alliance)	Richard Smee	599	28.2	+0.8
Conservative	Claire Barker	340	16.0	–7.2
Majority		589	27.7	+5.6
Turnout		2,127	40.8	–2.6
Registered electors		5,212		
Labour hold		Swing	▲2.8	

=== Market ===
Market
Party	Candidate	Votes	%	±%
Liberal (Alliance)	Colin Rosenstiel*	1,257	49.5	+7.5
Labour	Maureen Fallside	695	27.4	–1.1
Conservative	Richard Jones	492	19.4	–10.1
Ecology	Timothy Astin	93	3.7	N/A
Majority		562	22.2	+9.7
Turnout		2,537	43.1	–1.1
Registered electors		5,885		
Liberal hold		Swing	▲4.3	

=== Newnham ===
Newnham
Party	Candidate	Votes	%	±%
SDP (Alliance)	Gwyneth Lipstein*	1,204	37.8	+11.1
Labour	Jean Glasberg	1,052	33.1	–4.8
Conservative	David Bard	925	29.1	–6.3
Majority		152	4.8	N/A
Turnout		3,181	44.5	–3.5
Registered electors		7,148		
SDP hold		Swing	▲8.0	

=== Petersfield ===
Petersfield
Party	Candidate	Votes	%	±%
Labour	Jill Tufnell*	1,510	57.2	+1.3
Conservative	Steven Gardiner	645	24.4	–4.0
SDP (Alliance)	Andrew Lake	391	14.8	–0.9
Ecology	Guy Grimley	96	3.6	N/A
Majority		865	32.7	+5.2
Turnout		2,642	46.3	–1.1
Registered electors		5,704		
Labour hold		Swing	▲2.7	

=== Queens Edith ===
Queens Edith
Party	Candidate	Votes	%	±%
Conservative	Graham Edwards*	1,477	44.7	–3.3
Liberal (Alliance)	Michael Allen	1,238	37.5	+0.6
Labour	Jan Burt	491	14.9	–0.2
Ecology	Corinne Garvie	97	2.9	N/A
Majority		239	7.2	–3.9
Turnout		3,303	55.2	–3.1
Registered electors		5,981		
Conservative hold		Swing	▼2.0	

=== Romsey ===
Romsey
Party	Candidate	Votes	%	±%
Labour	Peter Wright*	1,497	55.0	+14.7
Liberal (Alliance)	Gale Waller	714	26.3	–13.0
Conservative	Colin Barker	509	18.7	+1.1
Majority		783	28.8	+27.7
Turnout		2,720	48.5	–7.3
Registered electors		5,613		
Labour hold		Swing	▲13.9	

=== Trumpington ===
Trumpington
Party	Candidate	Votes	%	±%
Conservative	Geoffrey Clark	1,166	49.4	–8.6
SDP (Alliance)	Anne Kent	767	32.5	+10.4
Labour	Alyson Makin	427	18.1	–1.7
Majority		399	16.9	–19.0
Turnout		2,362	41.4	–2.8
Registered electors		5,701		
Conservative hold		Swing	▼9.5	

=== West Chesterton ===
West Chesterton
Party	Candidate	Votes	%	±%
Liberal (Alliance)	Simon Boyd	1,206	41.7	–1.8
Conservative	Maurice Garner*	1,068	36.9	–1.5
Labour	Richard Overy	617	21.3	+3.2
Majority		138	4.8	–0.4
Turnout		2,891	54.7	–2.5
Registered electors		5,289		
Liberal gain from Conservative		Swing	▼0.2	

== By-elections ==
=== East Chesterton ===
East Chesterton: May 1985
Party	Candidate	Votes	%	±%
Labour	Martin Blake	1,199	35.1	+1.1
Conservative	Peter Day	1,177	34.5	–8.9
SDP (Alliance)	Simon Kightley	1,037	30.4	+7.8
Majority		22	0.6	N/A
Turnout		3,413		
Labour gain from Conservative		Swing	▲5.0	
