= 1994 Cambridge City Council election =

1994 UK local government election

← 1992	5 May 1994	1995 →

14 out of 42 seats to Cambridge City Council 22 seats needed for a majority
- Turnout: 44.1% (▲2.9%)

	First party	Second party	Third party
Party	Labour	Liberal Democrats	Conservative
Last election	17 seats, 36.3%	11 seats, 27.0%	12 seats, 34.5%
Seats won	7	7	0
Seats after	17	15	10
Seat change	▼2	▲4	▼2
Popular vote	14,843	14,159	7,048
Percentage	41.0%	39.1%	19.5%
Swing	▲4.7%	▲12.1%	▼15.0%
- Winner of each seat at the 1994 Cambridge City Council election
Council control before election
No overall control
Council control after election
No overall control

The 1994 Cambridge City Council election took place on 5 May 1994 to elect members of Cambridge City Council in Cambridge, Cambridgeshire, England. This was on the same day as other local elections across England.

== Summary ==
=== Election result ===
1994 Cambridge City Council election
Party	This election			Full council			This election		
Party	Seats	Net	Seats %	Other	Total	Total %	Votes	Votes %	+/−
Labour	7	▼2	50.0	10	17	40.5	14,843	41.0	+4.7
Liberal Democrats	7	▲4	50.0	8	15	35.7	14,159	39.1	+12.1
Conservative	0	▼2	0.0	10	10	23.8	7,048	19.5	–15.0
Green	0	Steady	0.0	0	0	0.0	118	0.3	–1.8

== Ward results ==
=== Abbey ===
Abbey
Party	Candidate	Votes	%	±%
Labour	Anthony Barnes*	965	66.2	+8.6
Conservative	Jeremy Froggett	253	17.4	–17.3
Liberal Democrats	Joan Molyneux-Hill	239	16.4	+8.6
Majority		712	48.9	+26.0
Turnout		1,457	30.7	+1.4
Registered electors		4,756		
Labour hold		Swing	▲13.0	

=== Arbury ===
Arbury
Party	Candidate	Votes	%	±%
Labour	Anthony Colombo	1,200	53.3	+11.6
Conservative	Thomas McGuire	583	25.9	–19.5
Liberal Democrats	Adrian Wrigley	467	20.8	+7.9
Majority		617	27.4	N/A
Turnout		2,250	43.3	+3.6
Registered electors		5,201		
Labour hold		Swing	▲15.6	

=== Castle ===
Castle
Party	Candidate	Votes	%	±%
Liberal Democrats	Alan Charlesworth*	1,597	53.5	+6.5
Labour	Angela Smith	739	24.8	+7.7
Conservative	Jacqueline Mitton	647	21.7	–14.3
Majority		858	28.8	+17.8
Turnout		2,983	46.8	+0.9
Registered electors		6,382		
Liberal Democrats hold		Swing	▼0.6	

=== Cherry Hinton ===
Cherry Hinton
Party	Candidate	Votes	%	±%
Labour	Alexander MacEachern*	1,391	52.5	+13.8
Conservative	Jason Webb	888	33.5	–13.9
Liberal Democrats	Ashley Woodford	370	14.0	+5.3
Majority		503	19.0	N/A
Turnout		2,649	49.3	+2.0
Registered electors		5,389		
Labour hold		Swing	▲13.8	

=== Coleridge ===
Coleridge
Party	Candidate	Votes	%	±%
Labour	Ruth Bagnall	1,545	61.0	+14.9
Conservative	Stephen George	607	24.0	–20.3
Liberal Democrats	Andrew Hoddinott	382	15.1	+5.5
Majority		938	37.0	+35.2
Turnout		2,534	44.4	+0.1
Registered electors		5,731		
Labour hold		Swing	▲17.6	

=== East Chesterton ===
East Chesterton
Party	Candidate	Votes	%	±%
Liberal Democrats	Sheila Stickley	1,402	46.0	+10.5
Labour	Christopher Wilson	1,196	39.2	+8.7
Conservative	Colin Havercroft	453	14.8	–19.2
Majority		206	6.8	+5.3
Turnout		3,051	45.6	+2.5
Registered electors		6,698		
Liberal Democrats gain from Labour		Swing	▲0.9	

=== Kings Hedges ===
Kings Hedges
Party	Candidate	Votes	%	±%
Labour	Angela Ratcliffe	1,000	64.8	+6.6
Liberal Democrats	Edna Howarth	314	20.3	+7.0
Conservative	Sally Black	229	14.8	–13.7
Majority		686	44.5	N/A
Turnout		1,543	31.3	+4.5
Registered electors		4,922		
Labour hold		Swing	▼0.2	

=== Market ===
Market
Party	Candidate	Votes	%	±%
Liberal Democrats	Joye Rosenstiel*	1,502	61.0	+11.8
Labour	David Blunt	676	27.4	–4.4
Conservative	James Strachan	286	11.6	–3.3
Majority		826	33.5	+16.2
Turnout		2,464	40.5	–3.5
Registered electors		6,107		
Liberal Democrats hold		Swing	▲8.1	

=== Newnham ===
Newnham
Party	Candidate	Votes	%	±%
Liberal Democrats	Christopher Larkin	1,477	46.7	+11.4
Labour	Asha Patel	1,290	40.8	+8.7
Conservative	Graham Stuart	394	12.5	–12.4
Majority		187	5.9	+2.7
Turnout		3,161	43.1	+1.5
Registered electors		7,370		
Liberal Democrats gain from Labour		Swing	▲1.4	

=== Petersfield ===
Petersfield
Party	Candidate	Votes	%	±%
Labour	Kevin Blencowe	1,387	49.6	–2.9
Liberal Democrats	Catherine Bowden	1,122	40.2	+20.6
Conservative	Valerie Clayton	285	10.2	–10.6
Majority		265	9.5	–22.1
Turnout		2,794	44.4	+6.0
Registered electors		6,326		
Labour hold		Swing	▼11.8	

=== Queens Edith ===
Queens Edith
Party	Candidate	Votes	%	±%
Liberal Democrats	Amanda Taylor	1,703	51.1	+15.1
Conservative	Chris Gough-Goodman*	913	27.4	–16.8
Labour	Caroline Smith	717	21.5	+1.7
Majority		790	23.7	N/A
Turnout		3,333	58.0	+5.4
Registered electors		5,762		
Liberal Democrats gain from Conservative		Swing	▲16.0	

=== Romsey ===
Romsey
Party	Candidate	Votes	%	±%
Labour	John Ratcliff	1,344	50.6	–5.2
Liberal Democrats	Catherine Smart	1,036	39.0	+24.4
Conservative	Stephen Wren	160	6.0	–15.2
Green	Ian Miller	118	4.4	–4.0
Majority		308	11.6	–23.1
Turnout		2,658	46.8	+13.4
Registered electors		5,700		
Labour hold		Swing	▼14.8	

=== Trumpington ===
Trumpington
Party	Candidate	Votes	%	±%
Liberal Democrats	Stephen Warde	1,201	46.2	+18.4
Conservative	Margaret Hoskins*	995	38.3	–17.9
Labour	Colin Dickins	402	15.5	–0.5
Majority		206	7.9	N/A
Turnout		2,598	43.7	+6.0
Registered electors		5,953		
Liberal Democrats gain from Conservative		Swing	▲18.2	

=== West Chesterton ===
West Chesterton
Party	Candidate	Votes	%	±%
Liberal Democrats	Ian Nimmo-Smith*	1,347	50.0	+12.3
Labour	Paul Humber	991	36.8	+4.0
Conservative	Dianne Walton	355	13.2	–16.2
Majority		356	13.2	+8.3
Turnout		2,693	47.8	–1.7
Registered electors		5,655		
Liberal Democrats hold		Swing	▲4.2	
