= 1983 Cambridge City Council election =

1983 English local election

| ← 1982 | 5 May 1983 | 1984 → |

14 out of 42 seats to Cambridge City Council 22 seats needed for a majority
- Turnout: 50.9% (▲4.2%)

| | First party | Second party | Third party |
|---|---|---|---|
| Party | Labour | Conservative | Alliance |
| Last election | 20 seats, 33.1% | 14 seats, 34.0% | 8 seats, 32.4% |
| Seats won | 7 | 4 | 3 |
| Seats after | 21 | 13 | 8 |
| Seat change | ▲1 | ▼1 | Steady |
| Popular vote | 14,464 | 14,190 | 11,517 |
| Percentage | 35.9% | 35.2% | 28.6% |
| Swing | ▲2.8% | ▲1.2% | ▼3.8% |
- Winner of each seat at the 1983 Cambridge City Council election
Council control before election
No overall control
Council control after election
No overall control

The 1983 Cambridge City Council election took place on 5 May 1983 to elect members of Cambridge City Council in Cambridge, Cambridgeshire, England. This was on the same day as other local elections across England.

== Summary ==
=== Election result ===
1983 Cambridge City Council election
| Party | This election | | | Full council | | | This election | | |
| Party | Seats | Net | Seats % | Other | Total | Total % | Votes | Votes % | +/− |
|---|---|---|---|---|---|---|---|---|---|
| Labour | 7 | ▲1 | 50.0 | 15 | 21 | 50.0 | 14,464 | 35.9 | +2.8 |
| Conservative | 4 | ▼1 | 28.6 | 9 | 13 | 31.0 | 14,190 | 35.2 | +1.2 |
| Alliance | 3 | Steady | 21.4 | 4 | 8 | 19.0 | 11,517 | 28.6 | –3.8 |
| Ecology | 0 | Steady | 0.0 | 0 | 0 | 0.0 | 90 | 0.2 | N/A |

== Ward results ==
=== Abbey ===
Abbey
| Party | Candidate | Votes | % | ±% |
|---|---|---|---|---|
| Labour | Eleanor Fairclough | 1,167 | 61.9 | +3.6 |
| Conservative | Sally-Anne Worland | 488 | 25.9 | +7.1 |
| Liberal (Alliance) | Kenneth Hales | 230 | 12.2 | –9.8 |
| Majority | | 679 | 36.0 | –1.1 |
| Turnout | | 1,885 | 40.6 | ±0.0 |
| Registered electors | | 4,641 | | |
| Labour hold | | Swing | ▼1.8 | |

=== Arbury ===
Arbury
| Party | Candidate | Votes | % | ±% |
|---|---|---|---|---|
| Labour | Edward Cowell* | 1,305 | 47.1 | +7.9 |
| Conservative | Stephen George | 893 | 32.2 | +0.5 |
| SDP (Alliance) | Philip Laidlaw | 572 | 20.6 | –8.5 |
| Majority | | 412 | 14.9 | +7.3 |
| Turnout | | 2,770 | 51.5 | +1.2 |
| Registered electors | | 5,379 | | |
| Labour hold | | Swing | ▲3.7 | |

=== Castle ===
Castle
| Party | Candidate | Votes | % | ±% |
|---|---|---|---|---|
| Liberal (Alliance) | David Pickles* | 1,425 | 45.9 | –0.4 |
| Conservative | George Reid | 1,077 | 34.7 | –3.3 |
| Labour | Vivien Allum | 605 | 19.5 | +3.8 |
| Majority | | 348 | 11.2 | +2.9 |
| Turnout | | 3,107 | 53.1 | +4.2 |
| Registered electors | | 5,849 | | |
| Liberal hold | | Swing | ▲1.5 | |

=== Cherry Hinton ===
Cherry Hinton
| Party | Candidate | Votes | % | ±% |
|---|---|---|---|---|
| Labour | Christopher Howard* | 1,443 | 46.0 | +7.1 |
| Conservative | Kevin Akehurst | 989 | 31.5 | –1.5 |
| Liberal (Alliance) | Gale Waller | 703 | 22.4 | –5.7 |
| Majority | | 454 | 14.5 | +8.6 |
| Turnout | | 3,135 | 59.3 | +4.3 |
| Registered electors | | 5,291 | | |
| Labour hold | | Swing | ▲4.3 | |

=== Coleridge ===
Coleridge
| Party | Candidate | Votes | % | ±% |
|---|---|---|---|---|
| Conservative | Frederick Burling* | 1,334 | 44.2 | +2.9 |
| Labour | Anthony Carter | 1,305 | 43.2 | +6.4 |
| Liberal (Alliance) | Stephen Hunter | 379 | 12.6 | –9.3 |
| Majority | | 29 | 1.0 | –3.5 |
| Turnout | | 3,018 | 55.5 | +4.4 |
| Registered electors | | 5,434 | | |
| Conservative hold | | Swing | ▼1.8 | |

=== East Chesterton ===
East Chesterton
| Party | Candidate | Votes | % | ±% |
|---|---|---|---|---|
| Conservative | Sidney Reid* | 1,320 | 41.0 | +0.2 |
| Labour | Peter Hall | 1,117 | 34.7 | +3.8 |
| SDP (Alliance) | Christine Carling | 786 | 24.4 | –3.9 |
| Majority | | 203 | 6.3 | –3.6 |
| Turnout | | 3,223 | 52.6 | +2.1 |
| Registered electors | | 6,126 | | |
| Conservative hold | | Swing | ▼1.8 | |

=== Kings Hedges ===
Kings Hedges
| Party | Candidate | Votes | % | ±% |
|---|---|---|---|---|
| Labour | Andrew Burn | 1,117 | 49.5 | +1.5 |
| Liberal (Alliance) | Richard Smee | 618 | 27.4 | +5.3 |
| Conservative | Andrew Dean | 523 | 23.2 | +2.0 |
| Majority | | 499 | 22.1 | –3.7 |
| Turnout | | 2,258 | 43.4 | +10.1 |
| Registered electors | | 5,199 | | |
| Labour hold | | Swing | ▼1.9 | |

=== Market ===
Market
| Party | Candidate | Votes | % | ±% |
|---|---|---|---|---|
| Liberal (Alliance) | Lavena Hawes* | 1,092 | 42.0 | –5.5 |
| Conservative | John Phillips | 766 | 29.5 | +2.3 |
| Labour | Maureen Fallside | 741 | 28.5 | +3.3 |
| Majority | | 326 | 12.5 | –7.8 |
| Turnout | | 2,599 | 44.2 | +5.6 |
| Registered electors | | 5,874 | | |
| Liberal hold | | Swing | ▼3.9 | |

=== Newnham ===
Newnham
| Party | Candidate | Votes | % | ±% |
|---|---|---|---|---|
| Labour | Ruth Cohen* | 1,308 | 37.9 | +1.5 |
| Conservative | David Bard | 1,223 | 35.4 | +2.2 |
| SDP (Alliance) | Margaret Reiss | 922 | 26.7 | –3.7 |
| Majority | | 85 | 2.5 | –0.7 |
| Turnout | | 3,453 | 48.0 | +8.0 |
| Registered electors | | 7,200 | | |
| Labour hold | | Swing | ▼0.4 | |

=== Petersfield ===
Petersfield
| Party | Candidate | Votes | % | ±% |
|---|---|---|---|---|
| Labour | Richard Robertson | 1,538 | 55.9 | +3.2 |
| Conservative | Geoffrey Clark | 781 | 28.4 | +5.7 |
| SDP (Alliance) | Troy Cooper | 431 | 15.7 | –9.0 |
| Majority | | 757 | 27.5 | –0.5 |
| Turnout | | 2,750 | 47.4 | –4.0 |
| Registered electors | | 5,796 | | |
| Labour hold | | Swing | ▼1.3 | |

=== Queens Edith ===
Queens Edith
| Party | Candidate | Votes | % | ±% |
|---|---|---|---|---|
| Conservative | Sylvia Dolby* | 1,670 | 48.0 | +3.1 |
| Liberal (Alliance) | Lesbia Bradford | 1,284 | 36.9 | –2.9 |
| Labour | Patricia Winney | 526 | 15.1 | –0.2 |
| Majority | | 386 | 11.1 | +6.0 |
| Turnout | | 3,480 | 58.3 | +2.0 |
| Registered electors | | 5,970 | | |
| Conservative hold | | Swing | ▲3.0 | |

=== Romsey ===
Romsey
| Party | Candidate | Votes | % | ±% |
|---|---|---|---|---|
| Labour | Simon Sedgwick-Jell | 1,263 | 40.3 | –5.5 |
| SDP (Alliance) | Cathy Grove* | 1,229 | 39.2 | +0.4 |
| Conservative | Julia Clark | 552 | 17.6 | +3.1 |
| Ecology | Guy Grimley | 90 | 2.9 | N/A |
| Majority | | 34 | 1.1 | –5.9 |
| Turnout | | 3,134 | 55.8 | +9.4 |
| Registered electors | | 5,615 | | |
| Labour gain from SDP | | Swing | ▼3.0 | |

=== Trumpington ===
Trumpington
| Party | Candidate | Votes | % | ±% |
|---|---|---|---|---|
| Conservative | Elaine Wheatley* | 1,428 | 58.0 | +2.4 |
| SDP (Alliance) | Kevin Robinson | 545 | 22.1 | –6.3 |
| Labour | Alyson Makin | 488 | 19.8 | +3.8 |
| Majority | | 883 | 35.9 | +8.6 |
| Turnout | | 2,461 | 44.2 | +0.1 |
| Registered electors | | 5,572 | | |
| Conservative hold | | Swing | ▲4.4 | |

=== West Chesterton ===
West Chesterton
| Party | Candidate | Votes | % | ±% |
|---|---|---|---|---|
| Liberal (Alliance) | Hilary Richmond | 1,301 | 43.5 | +2.0 |
| Conservative | Percival Reed* | 1,146 | 38.4 | –3.1 |
| Labour | Anil Sinha | 541 | 18.1 | +1.1 |
| Majority | | 155 | 5.2 | +5.1 |
| Turnout | | 2,988 | 57.2 | +6.2 |
| Registered electors | | 5,220 | | |
| Liberal gain from Conservative | | Swing | ▲2.6 | |
