= 1990 Cambridge City Council election =

1990 UK local government election

← 1988	5 May 1990	1991 →

15 out of 42 seats to Cambridge City Council 22 seats needed for a majority
- Turnout: 50.3% (▲3.9%)

	First party	Second party	Third party
Party	Labour	Conservative	Liberal Democrats
Last election	21 seats, 41.8%	15 seats, 34.4%	6 seats, 21.5%
Seats won	10	2	3
Seats after	22	14	6
Seat change	▲1	▼1	Steady
Popular vote	20,015	11,979	8,378
Percentage	45.6%	27.3%	19.1%
Swing	▲3.8%	▼7.1%	▼2.4%
- Winner of each seat at the 1990 Cambridge City Council election
Council control before election
No overall control
Council control after election
Labour

The 1990 Cambridge City Council election took place on 5 May 1990 to elect members of Cambridge City Council in Cambridge, Cambridgeshire, England. This was on the same day as other local elections across the UK.

== Summary ==
=== Election result ===
1990 Cambridge City Council election
Party	This election			Full council			This election		
Party	Seats	Net	Seats %	Other	Total	Total %	Votes	Votes %	+/−
Labour	10	▲1	66.7	12	22	52.4	20,015	45.6	+3.8
Conservative	2	▼1	13.3	12	14	33.3	11,979	27.3	–7.1
Liberal Democrats	3	Steady	20.0	3	6	14.3	8,378	19.1	–2.4
Green	0	Steady	0.0	0	0	0.0	3,494	8.0	+5.7

== Ward results ==
=== Abbey ===
Abbey
Party	Candidate	Votes	%	±%
Labour	Anthony Barnes	1,401	67.0	+2.4
Conservative	Sheila Cann	436	20.8	–4.7
Green	Stuart Emms	140	6.7	+2.9
Liberal Democrats	Brian Whitt	115	5.5	–0.6
Majority		965	46.1	+7.0
Turnout		2,092	42.7	+7.2
Registered electors		4,894		
Labour hold		Swing	▲3.6	

=== Arbury ===
Arbury
Party	Candidate	Votes	%	±%
Labour	Marie Thompson*	1,343	54.4	+2.6
Conservative	Julia Clark	687	27.8	–9.5
Liberal Democrats	Evelyn Corder	294	11.9	+1.0
Green	Simon Ounsworth	145	5.9	N/A
Majority		656	26.6	+12.2
Turnout		2,469	47.6	+7.1
Registered electors		5,192		
Labour hold		Swing	▲6.1	

=== Castle ===
Castle
Party	Candidate	Votes	%	±%
Liberal Democrats	Alan Charlesworth	1,139	33.6	–0.9
Labour	Kevin Price	1,014	29.9	–0.7
Conservative	June Saunders	983	29.0	–5.9
Green	Maxine Holloway	258	7.6	N/A
Majority		125	3.7	N/A
Turnout		3,394	55.5	+6.6
Registered electors		6,110		
Liberal Democrats hold		Swing	▼0.1	

=== Cherry Hinton ===
Cherry Hinton
Party	Candidate	Votes	%	±%
Labour	Alexander MacEachern	1,502	53.9	+2.3
Conservative	Richard Baty	885	31.7	–6.1
Green	Patrick Tooth	218	7.8	N/A
Liberal Democrats	Ken Lowe	184	6.6	–4.0
Majority		617	22.1	+8.4
Turnout		2,789	51.6	–7.4
Registered electors		5,402		
Labour hold		Swing	▲4.2	

=== Coleridge ===
Coleridge (2 seats due to by-election)
Party	Candidate	Votes	%
Labour	Jessie Ball	1,721	54.8
Labour	Alison New*	1,491	47.5
Conservative	Justin Coleman	989	31.5
Conservative	Jean Shinn	979	31.2
Liberal Democrats	Valerie Mackie	238	7.6
Liberal Democrats	Kathryn Robinson	212	6.7
Green	Jennifer Belza	193	6.1
Green	Gabrielle Hutton	183	5.8
Turnout		3,000	52.0
Registered electors		5,769	
Labour hold			
Labour hold			

=== East Chesterton ===
East Chesterton
Party	Candidate	Votes	%	±%
Labour	Valerie Antopolski	1,515	43.6	+6.7
Conservative	Geoffrey Howe	998	28.7	–19.9
Liberal Democrats	Roman Znajek	776	22.3	+7.8
Green	Peter Pope	186	5.4	N/A
Majority		517	14.9	N/A
Turnout		3,475	54.6	+7.0
Registered electors		6,359		
Labour gain from Conservative		Swing	▲13.3	

=== Kings Hedges ===
Kings Hedges
Party	Candidate	Votes	%	±%
Labour	Jill Patterson*	1,307	61.5	–3.7
Conservative	Martin Graham	381	17.9	–4.0
Liberal Democrats	David Creek	292	13.7	+0.9
Green	James Entwistle	144	6.8	N/A
Majority		926	43.6	+0.3
Turnout		2,124	40.5	+6.2
Registered electors		5,245		
Labour hold		Swing	▲0.2	

=== Market ===
Market
Party	Candidate	Votes	%	±%
Liberal Democrats	Joye Rosenstiel*	1,285	41.1	+3.7
Labour	Kevin Southernwood	1,184	37.9	–0.5
Conservative	Mark Waldron	361	11.5	–6.8
Green	Alred Droy	297	9.5	+3.6
Majority		101	3.2	N/A
Turnout		3,127	53.4	+7.0
Registered electors		5,860		
Liberal Democrats hold		Swing	▲2.1	

=== Newnham ===
Newnham
Party	Candidate	Votes	%	±%
Labour	Jean Glasberg	1,676	46.5	+12.6
Conservative	Mark Bishop	881	24.4	–3.1
Liberal Democrats	Nicholas Whyte	638	17.7	–13.6
Green	Joel Smith	409	11.3	+4.0
Majority		795	22.1	+19.4
Turnout		3,604	47.6	–2.3
Registered electors		7,221		
Labour hold		Swing	▲7.9	

=== Petersfield ===
Petersfield
Party	Candidate	Votes	%	±%
Labour	Francesca Stevens	1,751	60.9	–5.4
Conservative	Audrey Hull	497	17.3	–3.6
Green	Robert Graham	359	12.5	+7.1
Liberal Democrats	Andrew Paton	268	9.3	+1.9
Majority		1,254	43.6	–1.8
Turnout		2,875	46.6	+4.5
Registered electors		6,169		
Labour hold		Swing	▼0.9	

=== Queens Edith ===
Queens Edith
Party	Candidate	Votes	%	±%
Conservative	Chris Gough-Goodman*	1,456	44.1	–6.5
Labour	Andrew Hibbert	891	27.0	+6.0
Liberal Democrats	Lesley Bradford	886	26.9	–5.4
Green	Paul Martin	201	6.1	N/A
Majority		428	13.0	–4.7
Turnout		3,434	57.6	+3.8
Registered electors		5,727		
Conservative hold		Swing	▼6.3	

=== Romsey ===
Romsey
Party	Candidate	Votes	%	±%
Labour	Barry Gardiner	1,525	60.7	+9.6
Conservative	Rosemary Wheeler	367	14.6	–4.8
Liberal Democrats	Janice Corn	351	14.0	–11.0
Green	Ian Miller	271	10.8	+6.3
Majority		1,158	46.1	+20.0
Turnout		2,514	45.2	±0.0
Registered electors		5,556		
Labour hold		Swing	▲7.2	

=== Trumpington ===
Trumpington
Party	Candidate	Votes	%	±%
Conservative	Margaret Hoskins*	1,151	40.7	–11.1
Labour	Andrew Powell	713	25.2	+7.9
Liberal Democrats	Philippa Slatter	708	25.0	–5.8
Green	David Rees	255	9.0	N/A
Majority		438	15.5	–5.5
Turnout		2,827	46.2	+5.8
Registered electors		6,114		
Conservative hold		Swing	▼9.5	

=== West Chesterton ===
West Chesterton
Party	Candidate	Votes	%	±%
Liberal Democrats	Ian Nimmo-Smith	992	31.6	–0.4
Labour	Christine Mann	981	31.3	+6.8
Conservative	Rodney Stokes	928	29.6	–9.5
Green	Margaret Wright	235	7.5	+3.0
Majority		11	0.4	N/A
Turnout		3,136	56.5	+7.0
Registered electors		5,544		
Liberal Democrats hold		Swing	▼3.6	
