= Graham Stuart (politician) =

British politician

The Right Honourable Graham Stuart MP
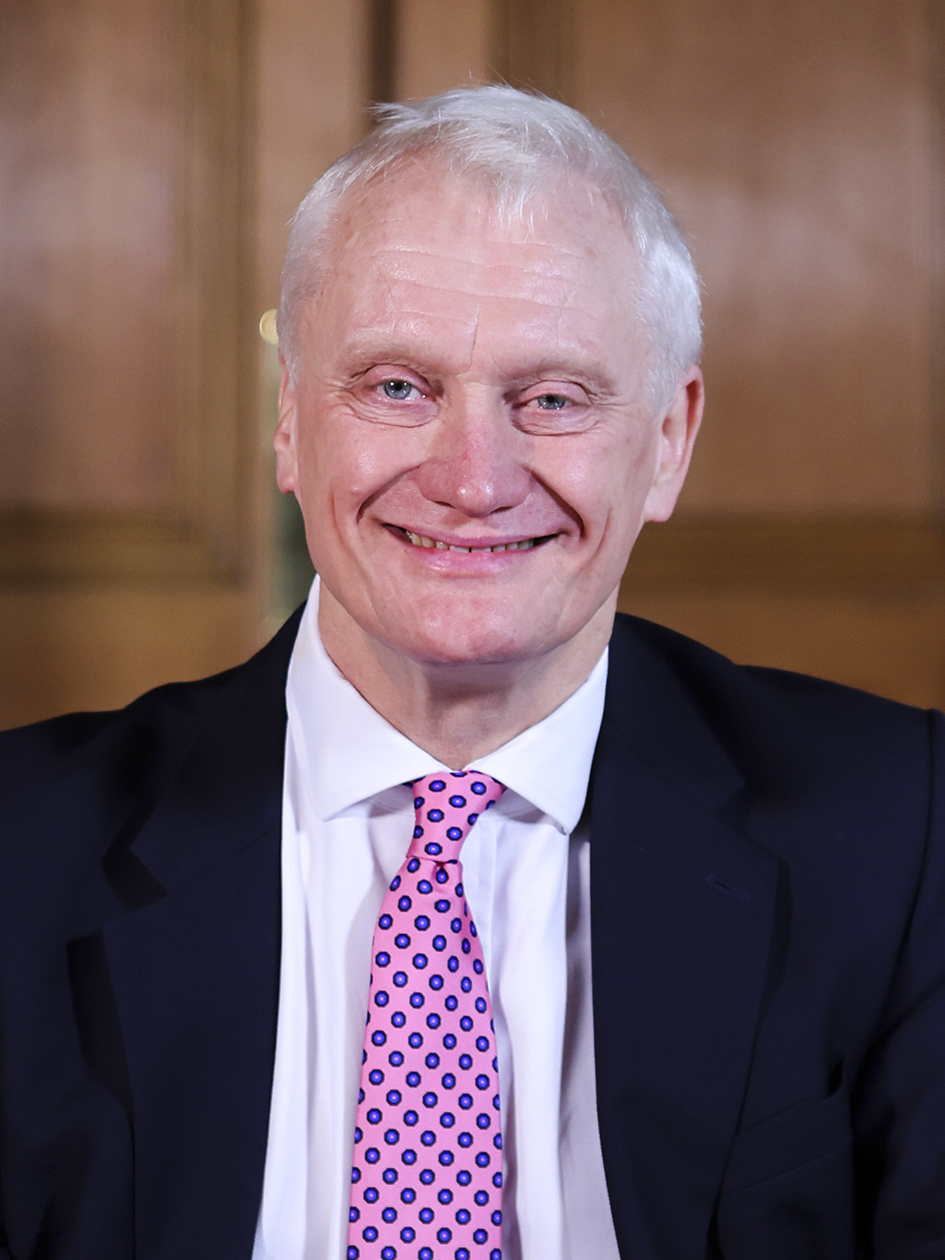
- Official portrait, 2022

Minister of State for Energy Security and Net Zero (Note: Minister of State for Climate and attending Cabinet from September to October 2022; Minister of State for Energy and Climate from October 2022 to February 2023.)
- In office 6 September 2022 – 12 April 2024
- Prime Minister: Liz Truss; Rishi Sunak
- Preceded by: Greg Hands
- Succeeded by: Justin Tomlinson

Minister of State for Europe
- In office 7 July 2022 – 6 September 2022
- Prime Minister: Boris Johnson
- Preceded by: James Cleverly
- Succeeded by: Leo Docherty

Parliamentary Under-Secretary of State for Exports
- In office 9 January 2018 – 16 September 2021
- Prime Minister: Theresa May; Boris Johnson
- Preceded by: Mark Garnier
- Succeeded by: Mike Freer

Chair of the Education Select Committee
- In office 9 June 2010 – 30 March 2015
- Preceded by: Barry Sheerman
- Succeeded by: Neil Carmichael

Member of Parliament for Beverley and Holderness
- Incumbent
- Assumed office 5 May 2005
- Preceded by: James Cran
- Majority: 124 (0.3%)

Member of Cambridge City Council for Cherry Hinton
- In office 7 May 1998 – 10 June 2004
- Preceded by: Alexander MacEachern
- Succeeded by: Eric Barrett-Payton

Personal details
- Born: Graham Charles Stuart; 12 March 1962 (age 64) Carlisle, Cumberland, England
- Party: Conservative
- Spouse: Anne Crawshaw
- Children: 2 daughters
- Education: Glenalmond College; University of Cambridge (dropped out)
- Website: www.grahamstuart.com

Graham Charles Stuart (born 12 March 1962) is a British Conservative Party politician and businessman who has served as the Member of Parliament for Beverley and Holderness since 2005. He previously served in various ministerial positions under Prime Ministers Theresa May, Boris Johnson, Liz Truss and Rishi Sunak between 2018 and 2024.

Born in Carlisle, Stuart was privately educated at Glenalmond College and later studied at the University of Cambridge as a student at Selwyn College, Cambridge. He served as a member of Cambridge City Council from 1998 to 2004 for the Conservative Party, and unsuccessfully contested the Cambridge constituency in the 2001 general election. He was elected to Parliament in 2005 general election for the constituency Beverley and Holderness, and was reelected in the 2010 general election. On the backbenches, Stuart was the Chair of the Education Select Committee from 2010 to 2015. He was reelected in both the 2015 and 2017 general elections. He joined the government in 2018 as Parliamentary Under-Secretary of State for Exports under Prime Minister Theresa May, and was reappointed to the position under Boris Johnson in 2019. He was reelected in the 2019 general election, and later returned to the backbenches after being dismissed by Johnson in 2021.

Stuart returned to the government as Minister of State for Europe following the July 2022 government crisis under Johnson. After Liz Truss became Prime Minister in September 2022, Stuart was appointed to a cabinet attending position as Minister of State for Climate. Following the appointment of Rishi Sunak as Prime Minister the following month, Stuart was reappointed to the position with the additional portfolio of Energy but was removed from cabinet. The portfolio was retitled to Energy Security and Net Zero in the February 2023 British cabinet reshuffle, before Stuart stood down from the position in April 2024. He was reelected in the 2024 general election with a reduced majority.

== Early life and education ==
Graham Stuart was born on 12 March 1962 in Carlisle, and attended Glenalmond College in Perthshire, before studying at the University of Cambridge from 1982 to 1985, where he read Philosophy and Law as an undergraduate student of Selwyn College, Cambridge. Stuart failed his degree, after focusing his efforts on developing his "What's on in Cambridge" guide into a profitable business. He remains a non-executive chairman of the company.

He served as Chairman of the Cambridge University Conservative Association in 1985.

== Political career ==
Stuart was elected as a member of Cambridge City Council for the Cherry Hinton Ward in the 1998 local elections. He contested the Cambridge constituency as the Conservative Party candidate at the 2001 general election, coming in third place with 9,829 votes, 23% of the share. He was re-elected to Cambridge City Council in the 2002 local elections and served until 2004.

== Parliamentary career ==
=== 1st term (2005–2010) ===
Stuart was elected to the House of Commons as Member of Parliament (MP) for Beverley and Holderness in the 2005 general election with a majority of 2,580. Following his election, he said "I plan to be upfront and have a high profile, not only within the constituency but nationally". He became a member of two select committees: the Environmental Audit Select Committee and the Children, Schools and Families Select Committee. He was elected a member of the Conservative Party Board in 2006.

In 2005, he founded Beverley and Holderness Pensioners Action Group, Community Hospitals Acting Nationally Together (CHANT), a cross-party campaign group, and Hull and Holderness Opposing the Incinerator (HOTI Group). He is vice-chairman of the GLOBE UK branch of Global Legislators Organisation for a Balanced Environment. Following the Parliamentary expenses scandal, Stuart defended his expenses in June 2009, which included spending £426 on bed linen and towels.

His campaigns in the 2005–10 Parliament included the defeat of legislation on home education and saving the Beverley Pasture Masters. In the following parliament, he was involved in the successful campaign for lower Humber Bridge tolls, and persuaded the government to improve the A164 and construct the Beverley Bypass. In 2012, he defeated a proposed increase in VAT on static caravans, which are largely manufactured in the East Riding of Yorkshire.

=== 2nd term (2010–2015) ===
At the 2010 general election Stuart was re-elected, increasing his share of the vote to 47.1% and increasing his majority to 12,987.

In June 2010, Stuart was elected by MPs as Chair of the Education Select Committee. Despite being a Conservative MP, Stuart frequently disagreed with the Secretary of State for Education Michael Gove. His committee produced up to six reports a year ranging from single evidence inquiries to more detailed examinations into Education, Schools and Family policy.

Stuart supports repealing the 2004 Hunting Act to bring back fox hunting, stating in 2010: "I've always said I would vote to reverse the ban".

=== 3rd term (2015–2017) ===
At the 2015 general election Stuart was again re-elected, increasing his vote share to 48.1%, but saw his majority cut from 12,987 to 12,203.

On 27 February 2016, Stuart announced his support for Britain continuing to be a member of the European Union.

In an interview with the journalist Peter Wilby for The Guardian, Stuart described himself as socially liberal, a "deficit hawk" who favours faster cuts to public spending, and an end to welfare dependency. He was appointed an Assistant Whip by the new Prime Minister, Theresa May on 18 July 2016.

=== 4th term (2017–2019) ===
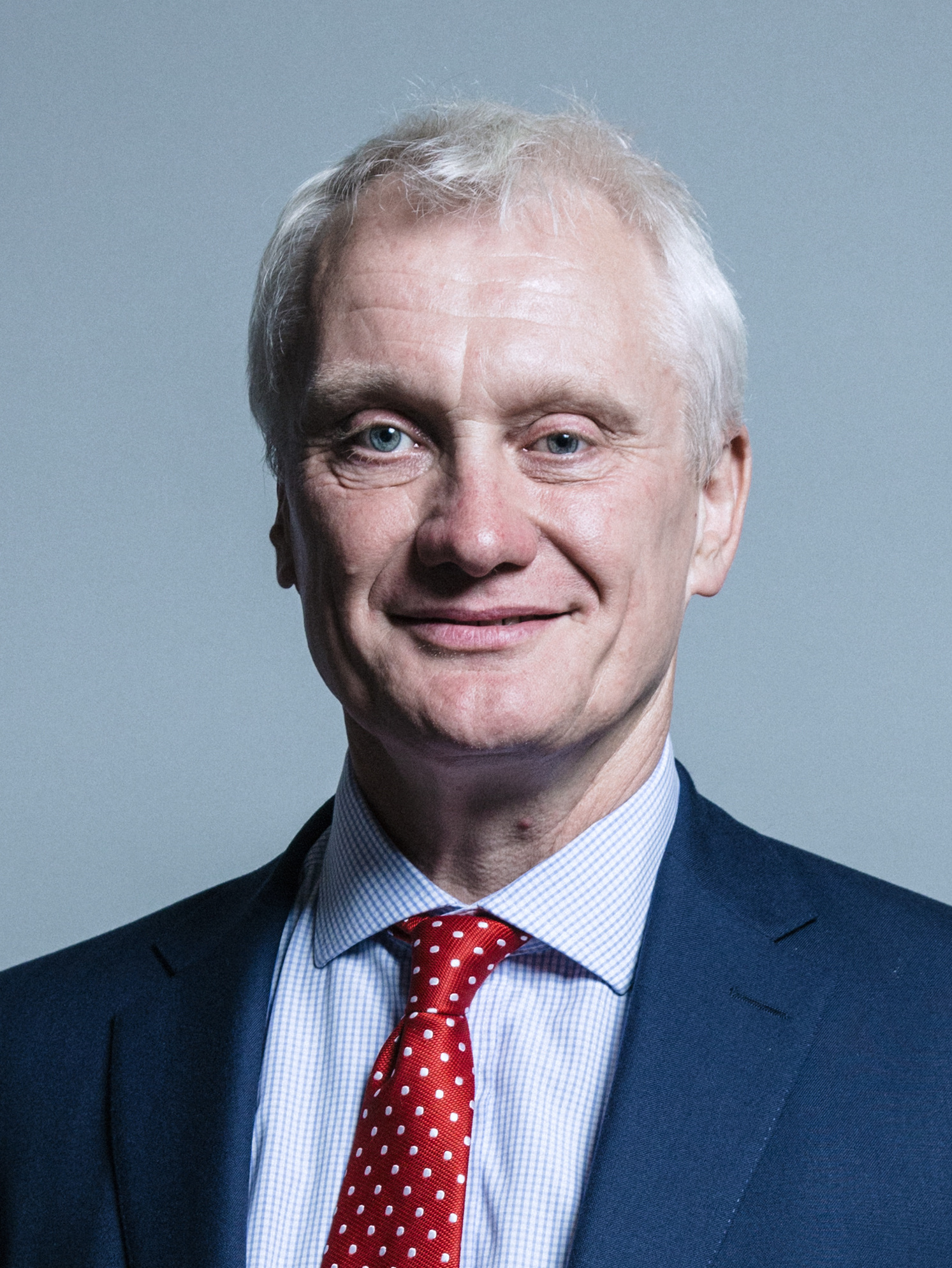
Graham Stuart in 2017

At the snap 2017 general election, Stuart was again re-elected, increasing his vote share to 58.4% and increasing his majority to 14,042.

Stuart was promoted to serve as Parliamentary Under-Secretary of State for Exports in the January 2019 government reshuffle. He returned to the backbenches in the September 2021 reshuffle.

=== 5th term (2019–2024) ===
Stuart was again re-elected at the 2019 general election, increasing his vote share to 62.1% and his majority to 20,448. This was the highest vote share and highest majority ever won by an MP in Beverley and Holderness.

In January 2022 Stuart was appointed as a Trade Envoy to Vietnam, Cambodia and Laos and held this role until July 2022. He was made Minister of State at the Foreign, Commonwealth and Development Office in July 2022 as part of the caretaker government by outgoing Prime Minister Boris Johnson.

He was made Minister of State for Climate in September 2022 as part of the incoming cabinet of Prime Minister Liz Truss. In one of his first interviews in his new position with the BBC, Stuart commented that oil and gas exploration in the North Sea would be "good for the environment". He attended Charles III's accession council on 10 September. He was formally appointed a privy counsellor three days later, granting him the honorific style The Right Honourable. On 19 October 2022, before a controversial vote on fracking that the government had declared a vote of confidence, Stuart suggested that the vote was not actually a confidence vote, apparently communicating a message from a "junior official at 10 Downing Street". The resulting confusion played a significant role in the resignation of Liz Truss the next day. On 27 October 2022, upon the appointment of Rishi Sunak as Prime Minister he was reappointed to his position and given the additional Energy portfolio but was removed from Cabinet.

In 2023, reports emerged that Stuart had received £10,000 donation towards his campaign from energy company JR Rix & Sons and an additional £2,000 from Bostonair, an aviation company, both based in Hull.

In April 2024, Stuart stood down as Energy Minister and Net Zero Minister.

=== 6th term (2024–) ===
At the 2024 general election, Stuart was again re-elected, with a decreased vote share of 34.5% and a narrow majority of 124.

In March 2025 Stuart suggested US President Donald Trump was a Russian asset/agent. When later challenged on the BBC he admitted he had "no hard and fast evidence" for the charge but said "well if it walks like a duck and quacks like a duck. What we’ve got is a president who is making absolutely no demands of the aggressor, the dictator... And therefore, it’s hard not to have it as a possibility."

== Personal life ==
Graham Stuart lives in Beverley and separated from his wife in January 2022. He enjoys motorcycling, cycling and cricket.

== Electoral results ==
=== UK Parliament elections ===
Date of election	Constituency	Party	Votes	%	Result
2001	Cambridge	Conservative	9,829	22.9	Not Elected (3rd / 8 candidates)
2005	Beverley and Holderness	Conservative	20,435	40.7	Elected (1st / 4 candidates)
2010	Beverley and Holderness	Conservative	25,063	47.1	Elected (1st / 7 candidates)
2015	Beverley and Holderness	Conservative	25,363	48.1	Elected (1st / 6 candidates)
2017	Beverley and Holderness	Conservative	32,499	58.4	Elected (1st / 5 candidates)
2019	Beverley and Holderness	Conservative	33,250	62.1	Elected (1st / 5 candidates)
2024	Beverley and Holderness	Conservative	15,501	34.5	Elected (1st / 8 candidates)

=== Cambridge City Council elections ===
Date of election	Constituency	Party	Votes	%	Result
1998	Cherry Hinton	Conservative	893	46.6	Elected (1st / 3 candidates)
2002	Cherry Hinton	Conservative	1,174	49.3	Elected (1st / 4 candidates)

=== Most recent election result ===
2024 general election: Beverley and Holderness (Note: The changes in percentage values since the 2019 election are based on notional results due to boundary changes.)
Party	Candidate	Votes	%	±%
Conservative	Graham Stuart	15,501	34.5	−26.5
Labour	Margaret Pinder	15,377	34.2	+9.5
Reform	Andrew Smith	8,198	18.3	N/A
Liberal Democrats	Denis Healy	3,386	7.5	−1.8
Green	Jonathan Stephenson	1,647	3.7	+1.2
Yorkshire	George McManus	625	1.4	−1.2
SDP	Chris Collin	89	0.2	N/A
Alliance for Democracy and Freedom	John Ottaway	74	0.2	N/A
Majority		124	0.3	−36.0
Turnout		44,897	62.4	−4.8
Registered electors		71,994		
Conservative hold		Swing	−18.0	

== Notes ==
Parliament of the United Kingdom
Preceded by James Cran	Member of Parliament for Beverley and Holderness; 2005–present	Incumbent
