= 1988 Cambridge City Council election =

1988 UK local government election

← 1987	5 May 1988	1990 →

14 out of 42 seats to Cambridge City Council 22 seats needed for a majority
- Turnout: 46.4% (▼5.0%)

	First party	Second party	Third party
Party	Labour	Conservative	SLD
Last election	19 seats, 33.3%	13 seats, 36.0%	10 seats, 29.6%
Seats won	9	5	0
Seats after	21	15	6
Seat change	▲2	▲2	▼4
Popular vote	15,751	12,937	8,108
Percentage	41.8%	34.4%	21.5%
Swing	▲8.5%	▼1.6%	▼9.1%
- Winner of each seat at the 1988 Cambridge City Council election
Council control before election
No overall control
Council control after election
No overall control

The 1988 Cambridge City Council election took place on 5 May 1988 to elect members of Cambridge City Council in Cambridge, Cambridgeshire, England. This was on the same day as other local elections across England.

== Summary ==
=== Election result ===
1988 Cambridge City Council election
Party	This election			Full council			This election		
Party	Seats	Net	Seats %	Other	Total	Total %	Votes	Votes %	+/−
Labour	9	▲2	64.3	12	21	50.0	15,751	41.8	+8.5
Conservative	5	▲2	35.7	10	15	35.7	12,937	34.4	–1.6
SLD	0	▼4	0.0	6	6	14.3	8,108	21.5	–9.1
Green	0	Steady	0.0	0	0	0.0	851	2.3	N/A

== Ward results ==
=== Abbey ===
Abbey
Party	Candidate	Votes	%	±%
Labour	Richard Smith*	1,096	64.6	+9.2
Conservative	Timothy Wheatley	433	25.5	–4.7
SLD	Barrie Coombes	103	6.1	–8.3
Green	Phillipa Bryan	64	3.8	N/A
Majority		663	39.1	+13.9
Turnout		1,696	35.5	–4.5
Registered electors		4,779		
Labour hold		Swing	▲7.0	

=== Arbury ===
Arbury
Party	Candidate	Votes	%	±%
Labour	Elizabeth Gard*	1,100	51.8	+12.1
Conservative	Sylvia Davenport	793	37.3	+0.4
SLD	Evelyn Corder	232	10.9	–12.4
Majority		307	14.4	+10.6
Turnout		2,125	40.5	–4.2
Registered electors		5,241		
Labour hold		Swing	▲5.9	

=== Castle ===
Castle
Party	Candidate	Votes	%	±%
Conservative	Robert Gregory	1,058	34.9	+0.5
SLD	Jane Bays	1,048	34.5	–9.3
Labour	Jessie Ball	928	30.6	+8.8
Majority		10	0.3	N/A
Turnout		3,034	48.9	–6.4
Registered electors		6,206		
Conservative gain from SLD		Swing	▲4.9	

=== Cherry Hinton ===
Cherry Hinton
Party	Candidate	Votes	%	±%
Labour	John Woodhouse*	1,623	51.6	+16.1
Conservative	Barry Wright	1,191	37.8	+0.5
SLD	Michael Allan	333	10.6	–16.6
Majority		432	13.7	N/A
Turnout		3,147	59.0	–4.6
Registered electors		5,334		
Labour hold		Swing	▲7.8	

=== Coleridge ===
Coleridge
Party	Candidate	Votes	%	±%
Labour	Mark Todd*	1,807	55.3	+15.8
Conservative	Rodney Stokes	1,267	38.8	–7.3
SLD	Catherine Bowden	194	5.9	–8.4
Majority		540	16.5	N/A
Turnout		3,268	56.0	–2.2
Registered electors		5,838		
Labour hold		Swing	▲11.6	

=== East Chesterton ===
East Chesterton
Party	Candidate	Votes	%	±%
Conservative	Stephen George*	1,460	48.6	+1.1
Labour	Mark Thompson	1,110	36.9	+7.3
SLD	Roman Znajek	437	14.5	–8.5
Majority		350	11.6	–6.3
Turnout		3,007	47.6	–6.2
Registered electors		6,322		
Conservative hold		Swing	▼3.1	

=== Kings Hedges ===
Kings Hedges
Party	Candidate	Votes	%	±%
Labour	Peter Cowell*	1,175	65.2	+22.4
Conservative	Marilyn Hulyer	395	21.9	–4.9
SLD	David Creek	231	12.8	–17.6
Majority		780	43.3	N/A
Turnout		1,801	34.3	–0.8
Registered electors		5,256		
Labour hold		Swing	▲13.7	

=== Market ===
Market
Party	Candidate	Votes	%	±%
Labour	Richard Leggatt	1,061	38.4	+4.1
SLD	Colin Rosenstiel*	1,032	37.4	–3.3
Conservative	Michael O'Hannan	506	18.3	–6.2
Green	Mark Tester	164	5.9	N/A
Majority		29	1.0	N/A
Turnout		2,763	46.4	–3.1
Registered electors		5,960		
Labour gain from SLD		Swing	▲3.7	

=== Newnham ===
Newnham
Party	Candidate	Votes	%	±%
Labour	Eleanor Fairclough	1,152	33.9	+0.3
SLD	Gwyneth Lipstein*	1,061	31.3	–7.8
Conservative	Ann Knight	934	27.5	+0.3
Green	Catherine Wolfe	248	7.3	N/A
Majority		91	2.7	N/A
Turnout		3,395	47.6	–5.9
Registered electors		7,132		
Labour gain from SLD		Swing	▲4.1	

=== Petersfield ===
Petersfield
Party	Candidate	Votes	%	±%
Labour	Jill Tuffnell	1,679	66.3	+14.1
Conservative	Christine Butler	529	20.9	–2.2
SLD	Andrew Paton	188	7.4	–15.7
Green	David Lenihan	138	5.4	N/A
Majority		1,150	45.4	+16.3
Turnout		2,534	42.1	–6.6
Registered electors		6,016		
Labour hold		Swing	▲8.2	

=== Queens Edith ===
Queens Edith
Party	Candidate	Votes	%	±%
Conservative	Graham Edwards	1,550	48.9	+3.4
SLD	Alan Baker	990	31.2	–8.0
Labour	Roger Fairclough	631	19.9	+4.6
Majority		560	17.7	+11.3
Turnout		3,171	53.8	–5.0
Registered electors		5,878		
Conservative hold		Swing	▲5.7	

=== Romsey ===
Romsey
Party	Candidate	Votes	%	±%
Labour	Peter Wright*	1,295	51.1	+0.6
SLD	Lee Jones	633	25.0	+4.8
Conservative	Rosemary Wheeler	492	19.4	–9.9
Green	David Fox	114	4.5	N/A
Majority		662	26.1	+4.8
Turnout		2,534	45.2	–0.7
Registered electors		5,609		
Labour hold		Swing	▼2.1	

=== Trumpington ===
Trumpington
Party	Candidate	Votes	%	±%
Conservative	Sonja Froggett	1,255	51.8	+0.7
SLD	Philippa Slatter	747	30.8	–4.8
Labour	Andrew Robson	420	17.3	+4.1
Majority		508	21.0	+5.5
Turnout		2,422	40.4	–8.2
Registered electors		6,002		
Conservative hold		Swing	▲2.8	

=== West Chesterton ===
West Chesterton
Party	Candidate	Votes	%	±%
Conservative	James Strachan	1,074	39.1	+0.2
SLD	Margaret Trowell	879	32.0	–11.9
Labour	Christine Mann	674	24.5	+7.4
Green	Margaret Wright	123	4.5	N/A
Majority		195	7.1	N/A
Turnout		2,750	49.5	–10.4
Registered electors		5,555		
Conservative gain from SLD		Swing	▲6.1	
