= 1992 Cambridge City Council election =

1992 UK local government election

| ← 1991 | 7 May 1992 | 1994 → |

15 out of 42 seats to Cambridge City Council 22 seats needed for a majority
- Turnout: 41.2% (▼3.3%)

| | First party | Second party | Third party |
|---|---|---|---|
| Party | Labour | Conservative | Liberal Democrats |
| Last election | 23 seats, 37.5% | 13 seats, 31.1% | 6 seats, 27.6% |
| Seats won | 6 | 4 | 5 |
| Seats after | 19 | 12 | 11 |
| Seat change | ▼4 | ▼1 | ▲5 |
| Popular vote | 12,530 | 11,915 | 9,326 |
| Percentage | 36.3% | 34.5% | 27.0% |
| Swing | ▼1.2% | ▲3.4% | ▼0.6% |
- Winner of each seat at the 1992 Cambridge City Council election
Council control before election
Labour
Council control after election
No overall control

The 1992 Cambridge City Council election took place on 7 May 1992 to elect members of Cambridge City Council in Cambridge, Cambridgeshire, England. This was on the same day as other local elections across England.

== Summary ==
=== Election result ===
1992 Cambridge City Council election
| Party | This election | | | Full council | | | This election | | |
| Party | Seats | Net | Seats % | Other | Total | Total % | Votes | Votes % | +/− |
|---|---|---|---|---|---|---|---|---|---|
| Labour | 6 | ▼4 | 40.0 | 13 | 19 | 45.2 | 12,530 | 36.3 | –1.2 |
| Conservative | 4 | ▼1 | 26.7 | 8 | 12 | 28.6 | 11,915 | 34.5 | +3.4 |
| Liberal Democrats | 5 | ▲5 | 33.3 | 6 | 11 | 26.2 | 9,326 | 27.0 | –0.6 |
| Green | 0 | Steady | 0.0 | 0 | 0 | 0.0 | 670 | 1.9 | –1.9 |
| Independent | 0 | Steady | 0.0 | 0 | 0 | 0.0 | 123 | 0.4 | N/A |

== Ward results ==
=== Abbey ===
Abbey
| Party | Candidate | Votes | % | ±% |
|---|---|---|---|---|
| Labour | Richard Smith* | 801 | 57.6 | –3.8 |
| Conservative | Joan Hill-Molyneux | 482 | 34.7 | +10.3 |
| Liberal Democrats | Paul Harden | 108 | 7.8 | –2.1 |
| Majority | | 319 | 22.9 | –14.0 |
| Turnout | | 1,391 | 29.3 | –7.1 |
| Registered electors | | 4,747 | | |
| Labour hold | | Swing | ▼7.1 | |

=== Arbury ===
Arbury
| Party | Candidate | Votes | % | ±% |
|---|---|---|---|---|
| Conservative | Vivian Ellis | 931 | 45.4 | +15.0 |
| Labour | Elizabeth Gard* | 855 | 41.7 | –6.3 |
| Liberal Democrats | Alison Pegrum | 265 | 12.9 | –8.7 |
| Majority | | 76 | 3.7 | N/A |
| Turnout | | 2,051 | 39.7 | –1.5 |
| Registered electors | | 5,169 | | |
| Conservative gain from Labour | | Swing | ▲10.7 | |

=== Castle ===
Castle
| Party | Candidate | Votes | % | ±% |
|---|---|---|---|---|
| Liberal Democrats | John Hipkin | 1,333 | 47.0 | –3.3 |
| Conservative | Simon Mitton | 1,021 | 36.0 | +6.1 |
| Labour | Simon Gosnell | 485 | 17.1 | –2.7 |
| Majority | | 312 | 11.0 | –9.4 |
| Turnout | | 2,839 | 45.9 | –5.0 |
| Registered electors | | 6,190 | | |
| Liberal Democrats gain from Conservative | | Swing | ▼4.7 | |

=== Cherry Hinton ===
Cherry Hinton
| Party | Candidate | Votes | % | ±% |
|---|---|---|---|---|
| Conservative | Tim Seaton | 1,193 | 47.4 | +6.8 |
| Labour | Anthony Schofield | 973 | 38.7 | –1.3 |
| Liberal Democrats | Suzanne Henney | 220 | 8.7 | –3.1 |
| Green | Elizabeth Cooper | 66 | 2.6 | N/A |
| Independent | Peter Chaplin | 65 | 2.6 | N/A |
| Majority | | 220 | 8.7 | N/A |
| Turnout | | 2,517 | 47.3 | –1.7 |
| Registered electors | | 5,326 | | |
| Conservative gain from Labour | | Swing | ▲4.1 | |

=== Coleridge ===
Coleridge
| Party | Candidate | Votes | % | ±% |
|---|---|---|---|---|
| Labour | Jeremy Benstead | 1,153 | 46.1 | –2.1 |
| Conservative | Richard Jones | 1,109 | 44.3 | +7.3 |
| Liberal Democrats | Andrew Paton | 241 | 9.6 | –1.0 |
| Majority | | 44 | 1.8 | –9.5 |
| Turnout | | 2,503 | 44.3 | –3.5 |
| Registered electors | | 5,646 | | |
| Labour hold | | Swing | ▼4.7 | |

=== East Chesterton ===
East Chesterton
| Party | Candidate | Votes | % | ±% |
|---|---|---|---|---|
| Liberal Democrats | Joseph Nunes | 987 | 35.5 | +1.8 |
| Conservative | Alan Carter | 945 | 34.0 | +1.9 |
| Labour | Michael Rooney | 848 | 30.5 | –0.8 |
| Majority | | 42 | 1.5 | –0.1 |
| Turnout | | 2,780 | 43.1 | –8.0 |
| Registered electors | | 6,443 | | |
| Liberal Democrats gain from Conservative | | Swing | ▼0.1 | |

=== Kings Hedges ===
Kings Hedges (2 seats due to by-election)
| Party | Candidate | Votes | % |
|---|---|---|---|
| Labour | Peter Cowell* | 871 | 58.4 |
| Labour | Kevin Price | 657 | 44.0 |
| Conservative | Geoffrey Howe | 426 | 28.6 |
| Conservative | Richard Baty | 390 | 26.1 |
| Liberal Democrats | Stephen Howarth | 199 | 13.3 |
| Liberal Democrats | Stephen Warde | 144 | 9.7 |
| Turnout | | 1,345 | 26.8 |
| Registered electors | | 5,017 | |
| Labour hold | | | |
| Labour hold | | | |

=== Market ===
Market
| Party | Candidate | Votes | % | ±% |
|---|---|---|---|---|
| Liberal Democrats | Colin Rosenstiel | 1,313 | 49.2 | –0.3 |
| Labour | Richard Leggatt* | 850 | 31.8 | +1.5 |
| Conservative | Richard Harwood | 398 | 14.9 | +1.9 |
| Green | Timothy Cooper | 109 | 4.1 | –3.1 |
| Majority | | 463 | 17.3 | –1.8 |
| Turnout | | 2,670 | 44.0 | –1.2 |
| Registered electors | | 6,073 | | |
| Liberal Democrats gain from Labour | | Swing | ▼0.9 | |

=== Newnham ===
Newnham
| Party | Candidate | Votes | % | ±% |
|---|---|---|---|---|
| Liberal Democrats | Joyce Baird | 1,075 | 35.3 | +7.1 |
| Labour | Eleanor Fairclough* | 977 | 32.1 | –1.1 |
| Conservative | Kenneth Wheatcroft | 760 | 24.9 | –4.6 |
| Green | Margaret Wright | 178 | 5.8 | –3.3 |
| Independent | Neil Costello | 58 | 1.9 | N/A |
| Majority | | 98 | 3.2 | N/A |
| Turnout | | 3,048 | 41.6 | ±0.0 |
| Registered electors | | 7,326 | | |
| Liberal Democrats gain from Labour | | Swing | ▲4.1 | |

=== Petersfield ===
Petersfield
| Party | Candidate | Votes | % | ±% |
|---|---|---|---|---|
| Labour | Benjamin Bradnack | 1,220 | 52.5 | –4.0 |
| Conservative | Dianne Walton | 484 | 20.8 | +1.5 |
| Liberal Democrats | Britt Meyland-Smith | 456 | 19.6 | +5.3 |
| Green | Daryl Tayar | 166 | 7.1 | –2.7 |
| Majority | | 736 | 31.6 | –5.6 |
| Turnout | | 2,326 | 38.1 | –0.7 |
| Registered electors | | 6,112 | | |
| Labour hold | | Swing | ▼2.8 | |

=== Queens Edith ===
Queens Edith
| Party | Candidate | Votes | % | ±% |
|---|---|---|---|---|
| Conservative | Graham Edwards* | 1,326 | 44.2 | –2.5 |
| Liberal Democrats | Richard Darlington | 1,082 | 36.0 | +6.7 |
| Labour | Pamela Henderson | 595 | 19.8 | –4.2 |
| Majority | | 244 | 8.1 | –9.3 |
| Turnout | | 3,003 | 52.6 | +0.5 |
| Registered electors | | 5,704 | | |
| Conservative hold | | Swing | ▼4.6 | |

=== Romsey ===
Romsey
| Party | Candidate | Votes | % | ±% |
|---|---|---|---|---|
| Labour | Peter Wright* | 1,002 | 55.8 | +3.5 |
| Conservative | Rachel Atherton | 380 | 21.2 | +3.4 |
| Liberal Democrats | Rupert Ford | 262 | 14.6 | –4.9 |
| Green | Ian Miller | 151 | 8.4 | –1.9 |
| Majority | | 622 | 34.7 | +1.7 |
| Turnout | | 1,795 | 33.4 | –5.8 |
| Registered electors | | 5,381 | | |
| Labour hold | | Swing | ▲0.1 | |

=== Trumpington ===
Trumpington
| Party | Candidate | Votes | % | ±% |
|---|---|---|---|---|
| Conservative | Sonja Froggett* | 1,283 | 56.2 | +7.3 |
| Liberal Democrats | Phillipa Slatter | 633 | 27.8 | +0.8 |
| Labour | Christopher Wilson | 365 | 16.0 | –2.6 |
| Majority | | 650 | 28.5 | +6.6 |
| Turnout | | 2,281 | 37.7 | –3.3 |
| Registered electors | | 6,058 | | |
| Conservative hold | | Swing | ▲3.3 | |

=== West Chesterton ===
West Chesterton
| Party | Candidate | Votes | % | ±% |
|---|---|---|---|---|
| Liberal Democrats | Gaynor Griffiths | 1,008 | 37.7 | –5.6 |
| Labour | Christine Mann | 878 | 32.8 | +4.1 |
| Conservative | Sandra Manley | 787 | 29.4 | +1.4 |
| Majority | | 130 | 4.9 | –8.4 |
| Turnout | | 2,673 | 49.5 | –2.7 |
| Registered electors | | 5,405 | | |
| Liberal Democrats gain from Conservative | | Swing | ▼4.9 | |
