= 1987 Cambridge City Council election =

1987 UK local government election

← 1986	7 May 1987	1988 →

15 out of 42 seats to Cambridge City Council 22 seats needed for a majority
- Turnout: 51.4% (▲4.8%)

	First party	Second party	Third party
Party	Labour	Conservative	Alliance
Last election	21 seats, 37.5%	12 seats, 32.7%	9 seats, 28.1%
Seats won	6	5	4
Seats after	19	13	10
Seat change	▼2	▲1	▲1
Popular vote	14,491	15,646	13,291
Percentage	33.3%	36.0%	30.6%
Swing	▼4.2%	▲3.3%	▲2.5%
- Winner of each seat at the 1987 Cambridge City Council election
Council control before election
No overall control
Council control after election
No overall control

The 1987 Cambridge City Council election took place on 7 May 1987 to elect members of Cambridge City Council in Cambridge, Cambridgeshire, England. This was on the same day as other local elections across England.

== Summary ==
=== Election result ===
1987 Cambridge City Council election
Party	This election			Full council			This election		
Party	Seats	Net	Seats %	Other	Total	Total %	Votes	Votes %	+/−
Labour	6	▼2	40.0	13	19	45.2	14,491	33.3	–4.2
Conservative	5	▲1	33.3	8	13	31.0	15,646	36.0	+3.3
Alliance	4	▲1	26.7	6	10	23.8	13,291	30.6	+2.5
Independent	0	Steady	0.0	0	0	0.0	44	0.1	±0.0

== Ward results ==
=== Abbey ===
Abbey
Party	Candidate	Votes	%	±%
Labour	John Durrant	1,069	55.4	–4.5
Conservative	Julie Hayward	583	30.2	+5.8
Liberal (Alliance)	Simon Jordan	278	14.4	–1.4
Majority		486	25.2	–10.3
Turnout		1,930	40.0	+5.6
Registered electors		4,826		
Labour hold		Swing	▼5.2	

=== Arbury ===
Arbury
Party	Candidate	Votes	%	±%
Labour	Peter Chaplin	959	39.7	–7.6
Conservative	Sylvia Davenport	891	36.9	+6.4
SDP (Alliance)	Alison Pegrum	563	23.3	+1.2
Majority		68	2.8	–14.0
Turnout		2,413	44.7	+3.6
Registered electors		5,400		
Labour hold		Swing	▼7.0	

=== Castle ===
Castle
Party	Candidate	Votes	%	±%
Liberal (Alliance)	David Howarth	1,470	43.8	+2.6
Conservative	Robert Gregory	1,153	34.4	+1.8
Labour	Jessie Ball	733	21.8	–3.5
Majority		317	9.4	–0.1
Turnout		3,356	55.3	+5.7
Registered electors		6,071		
Liberal hold		Swing	▲0.4	

=== Cherry Hinton ===
Cherry Hinton
Party	Candidate	Votes	%	±%
Conservative	Ann Wright	1,262	37.3	+4.7
Labour	Christopher Howard*	1,200	35.5	–6.3
Liberal (Alliance)	Mary Basham	918	27.2	+1.6
Majority		62	1.8	N/A
Turnout		3,380	63.6	+10.2
Registered electors		5,312		
Conservative gain from Labour		Swing	▲5.5	

=== Coleridge ===
Coleridge
Party	Candidate	Votes	%	±%
Conservative	Frederick Burling*	1,559	46.1	+7.3
Labour	Martin Blake	1,337	39.5	–8.8
Liberal (Alliance)	Andrew Paton	485	14.3	+1.4
Majority		222	6.6	N/A
Turnout		3,381	58.2	+5.4
Registered electors		5,810		
Conservative hold		Swing	▲8.1	

=== East Chesterton ===
East Chesterton
Party	Candidate	Votes	%	±%
Conservative	Gordon Beckett	1,628	47.5	+6.7
Labour	Eleanor Fairclough*	1,013	29.6	–6.0
SDP (Alliance)	Margaret Trowell	787	23.0	–0.5
Majority		615	17.9	+12.7
Turnout		3,428	53.8	–1.3
Registered electors		6,367		
Conservative hold		Swing	▲6.4	

=== Kings Hedges ===
Kings Hedges (2 seats due to by-election)
Party	Candidate	Votes	%
Labour	Stephen Hopkins	809	41.8
Labour	Jill Patterson	756	39.0
SDP (Alliance)	David Creek	575	29.7
Conservative	Aidan Dodson	507	26.2
Conservative	Peter Hoskins	500	25.8
SDP (Alliance)	Peter Warner	472	24.4
Turnout		1,891	35.1
Registered electors		5,386	
Labour hold			
Labour hold			

=== Market ===
Market
Party	Candidate	Votes	%	±%
Liberal (Alliance)	Lavena Hawes*	1,202	40.7	–1.9
Labour	Richard Leggatt	1,026	34.3	+3.3
Conservative	Mark Cathcart	724	24.5	+6.4
Majority		176	6.0	–5.1
Turnout		2,952	49.5	+8.2
Registered electors		5,963		
Liberal hold		Swing	▼2.6	

=== Newnham ===
Newnham
Party	Candidate	Votes	%	±%
SDP (Alliance)	Elsa Meyland-Smith	1,496	39.1	+6.8
Labour	Jean Glasberg	1,286	33.6	+1.1
Conservative	Edward Connolly	1,040	27.2	+0.2
Majority		210	5.5	N/A
Turnout		3,822	53.5	+7.8
Registered electors		7,145		
SDP gain from Labour		Swing	▲2.9	

=== Petersfield ===
Petersfield
Party	Candidate	Votes	%	±%
Labour	Richard Robertson*	1,517	52.2	–12.3
Conservative	Steuart Northfield	672	23.1	+1.4
SDP (Alliance)	Andrew Lake	671	23.1	+9.4
Independent	William Gill	44	1.5	N/A
Majority		845	29.1	–13.8
Turnout		2,904	48.7	+3.7
Registered electors		5,959		
Labour hold		Swing	▼6.9	

=== Queens Edith ===
Queens Edith
Party	Candidate	Votes	%	±%
Conservative	George Reid	1,622	45.5	+1.5
SDP (Alliance)	Patricia Reynolds	1,395	39.2	–0.2
Labour	Timothy Bedford	543	15.3	–1.2
Majority		227	6.4	+1.6
Turnout		3,560	58.8	+13.8
Registered electors		5,906		
Conservative hold		Swing	▲0.9	

=== Romsey ===
Romsey
Party	Candidate	Votes	%	±%
Labour	Simon Segdwick-Jell	1,304	50.5	–8.0
Conservative	Rosemary Wheeler	755	29.3	+5.1
Liberal (Alliance)	Karen Anderson	522	20.2	+2.9
Majority		549	21.3	–13.0
Turnout		2,581	45.9	+7.1
Registered electors		5,621		
Labour hold		Swing	▼6.6	

=== Trumpington ===
Trumpington
Party	Candidate	Votes	%	±%
Conservative	Elaine Wheatley*	1,495	51.1	+2.6
SDP (Alliance)	Philippa Slatter	1,041	35.6	+0.5
Labour	Martin Rose	387	13.2	–2.3
Majority		454	15.5	+2.1
Turnout		2,923	48.6	±0.0
Registered electors		6,020		
Conservative hold		Swing	▲1.1	

=== West Chesterton ===
West Chesterton
Party	Candidate	Votes	%	±%
SDP (Alliance)	Evelyn Knowles	1,416	43.9	+7.3
Conservative	James Strachan	1,255	38.9	+3.6
Labour	Valerie Antopolski	552	17.1	–6.2
Majority		161	5.0	+3.7
Turnout		3,223	59.9	+6.9
Registered electors		5,380		
SDP hold		Swing	▲1.9	
