= 1986 Cambridge City Council election =

1986 English local election

← 1984	8 May 1986	1987 →

14 out of 42 seats to Cambridge City Council 22 seats needed for a majority
- Turnout: 46.6% (▼1.1%)

	First party	Second party	Third party
Party	Labour	Conservative	Alliance
Last election	21 seats, 37.9%	12 seats, 32.4%	9 seats, 28.9%
Seats won	8	3	3
Seats after	21	12	9
Seat change	▼1	▲1	Steady
Popular vote	13,979	12,178	10,493
Percentage	37.5%	32.7%	28.1%
Swing	▼0.4%	▲0.3%	▼0.8%
- Winner of each seat at the 1986 Cambridge City Council election
Council control before election
Labour
Council control after election
No overall control

The 1986 Cambridge City Council election took place on 8 May 1986 to elect members of Cambridge City Council in Cambridge, Cambridgeshire, England. This was on the same day as other local elections across England.

== Summary ==
=== Election result ===
1986 Cambridge City Council election
Party	This election			Full council			This election		
Party	Seats	Net	Seats %	Other	Total	Total %	Votes	Votes %	+/−
Labour	8	▼1	57.1	13	21	50.0	13,979	37.5	–0.4
Conservative	3	▲1	21.4	9	12	28.6	12,178	32.7	+0.3
Alliance	3	Steady	21.4	6	9	21.4	10,493	28.1	–0.8
Green	0	Steady	0.0	0	0	0.0	594	1.6	+0.8
Independent	0	Steady	0.0	0	0	0.0	26	0.1	N/A
Communist	0	Steady	0.0	0	0	0.0	20	0.1	N/A

== Ward results ==
=== Abbey ===
Abbey
Party	Candidate	Votes	%	±%
Labour	Anthony Barnes	998	59.9	–2.4
Conservative	Julie Hayward	406	24.4	–4.0
SDP (Alliance)	Brian Whitt	263	15.8	+6.4
Majority		592	35.5	+1.6
Turnout		1,667	34.4	–6.8
Registered electors		4,852		
Labour hold		Swing	▲0.8	

=== Arbury ===
Arbury
Party	Candidate	Votes	%	±%
Labour	Marie Thompson	1,041	47.3	+0.5
Conservative	Sylvia Davenport	672	30.5	–1.2
Liberal (Alliance)	Karen Burgess	487	22.1	+0.6
Majority		369	16.8	+1.7
Turnout		2,200	41.1	–2.0
Registered electors		5,347		
Labour hold		Swing	▲0.9	

=== Castle ===
Castle
Party	Candidate	Votes	%	±%
Liberal (Alliance)	Andrew Duff*	1,221	41.2	–2.2
Conservative	Peter Hoskins	945	32.6	–0.7
Labour	Jonathan Megginson	734	25.3	+2.9
Majority		276	9.5	–1.5
Turnout		2,900	49.6	+0.9
Registered electors		5,850		
Liberal hold		Swing	▼0.8	

=== Cherry Hinton ===
Cherry Hinton
Party	Candidate	Votes	%	±%
Labour	Thomas Ling	1,199	41.8	–7.3
Conservative	Ann Wright	936	32.6	+2.7
SDP (Alliance)	Norman Braddick	734	25.6	+4.7
Majority		263	9.2	–10.0
Turnout		2,869	53.4	+0.5
Registered electors		5,373		
Labour hold		Swing	▼5.0	

=== Coleridge ===
Coleridge
Party	Candidate	Votes	%	±%
Labour	Alison New	1,474	48.3	–0.4
Conservative	Gordon Beckett	1,184	38.8	–0.9
Liberal (Alliance)	Andrew Paton	395	12.9	+1.3
Majority		290	9.5	+0.5
Turnout		3,053	52.8	–4.2
Registered electors		5,777		
Labour hold		Swing	▲0.3	

=== East Chesterton ===
East Chesterton
Party	Candidate	Votes	%	±%
Conservative	Peter Day	1,429	40.8	–2.6
Labour	Martin Blake*	1,247	35.6	+1.6
SDP (Alliance)	Victor Godfrey	824	23.5	+0.9
Majority		182	5.2	–4.1
Turnout		3,500	55.1	+4.8
Registered electors		6,347		
Conservative gain from Labour		Swing	▼2.1	

=== Kings Hedges ===
Kings Hedges
Party	Candidate	Votes	%	±%
Labour	Ruth Overhill*	881	52.2	–3.7
Liberal (Alliance)	David Howarth	418	24.7	–3.5
Conservative	Steuart Northfield	370	21.9	+5.9
Communist	Glenn Richer	20	1.2	N/A
Majority		463	27.5	–0.2
Turnout		1,689	31.7	–9.1
Registered electors		5,323		
Labour hold		Swing	▼0.1	

=== Market ===
Market
Party	Candidate	Votes	%	±%
Liberal (Alliance)	Joye Rosenstiel*	1,036	42.6	–6.9
Labour	Richard Leggatt	765	31.5	+4.1
Conservative	Aidan Dodson	439	18.1	–1.3
Green	Julian Paren	191	7.9	+4.2
Majority		271	11.1	–11.1
Turnout		2,431	41.3	–1.8
Registered electors		5,893		
Liberal hold		Swing	▼5.5	

=== Newnham ===
Newnham
Party	Candidate	Votes	%	±%
Labour	Violet Cane*	1,057	32.5	–0.6
SDP (Alliance)	Christine Bondi	1,053	32.3	–5.5
Conservative	Edward Connolly	878	27.0	–2.1
Green	Stephen Lloyd	269	8.3	N/A
Majority		4	0.2	N/A
Turnout		3,257	45.7	+1.2
Registered electors		7,125		
Labour hold		Swing	▼2.5	

=== Petersfield ===
Petersfield
Party	Candidate	Votes	%	±%
Labour	Frank Gawthrop*	1,676	64.6	+7.5
Conservative	Dianne Walton	562	21.7	–2.7
Liberal (Alliance)	Keith Edkins	354	13.7	–1.1
Majority		1,113	42.9	+10.2
Turnout		2,592	45.0	–1.3
Registered electors		5,761		
Labour hold		Swing	▲5.1	

=== Queens Edith ===
Queens Edith
Party	Candidate	Votes	%	±%
Conservative	Chris Gouch-Goodman	1,456	44.1	–0.6
Liberal (Alliance)	Lesley Bradford	1,298	39.4	+1.9
Labour	Emma Stiles	544	16.5	+1.6
Majority		158	4.8	–2.4
Turnout		3,298	45.0	–10.2
Registered electors		5,761		
Conservative hold		Swing	▼1.3	

=== Romsey ===
Romsey
Party	Candidate	Votes	%	±%
Labour	Terence Sweeney*	1,261	58.5	+3.5
Conservative	Colin Barker	521	24.2	+5.5
SDP (Alliance)	Carla Hurrell	373	17.3	–9.0
Majority		740	34.3	+5.5
Turnout		2,155	38.8	–9.7
Registered electors		5,560		
Labour hold		Swing	▼1.0	

=== Trumpington ===
Trumpington
Party	Candidate	Votes	%	±%
Conservative	Millicent Suckling*	1,374	48.5	–0.9
SDP (Alliance)	Philippa Slater	994	35.1	+2.6
Labour	Nicola Glegg	438	15.5	–2.6
Independent	Lewis Wilbur	26	0.9	N/A
Majority		380	13.4	–3.5
Turnout		2,832	48.6	+7.2
Registered electors		5,824		
Conservative hold		Swing	▼1.8	

=== West Chesterton ===
West Chesterton
Party	Candidate	Votes	%	±%
SDP (Alliance)	Stephen Marshall	1,043	36.6	–5.1
Conservative	James Strachan	1,006	35.3	–1.6
Labour	Paul McHugh	664	23.3	+2.0
Green	Margaret Wright	134	4.7	N/A
Majority		37	1.3	–3.5
Turnout		2,847	53.0	–1.7
Registered electors		5,367		
SDP hold		Swing	▼1.8	
