= 2002 Cambridge City Council election =

Cambridge City Council election

- 2 May 2002

15 out of 42 seats 22 seats needed for a majority

| | First party | Second party | Third party |
|---|---|---|---|
| Party | Liberal Democrats | Labour | Conservative |
| Last election | 22 | 17 | 3 |
| Seats before | 22 | 17 | 3 |
| Seats won | 9 | 5 | 1 |
| Seats after | 23 | 17 | 2 |
| Seat change | ▲1 | Steady | ▼1 |
| Popular vote | 12,294 | 8,821 | 6,455 |
| Percentage | 40.6% | 29.1% | 21.3% |
- Winner of each seat at the 2002 Cambridge City Council election

The 2002 Cambridge City Council election took place on 2 May 2002 to elect members of Cambridge City Council in England. This was on the same day as other nationwide local elections.

== Results summary ==
2002 Cambridge City Council election
| Party | This election | | | Full council | | | This election | | |
| Party | Seats | Net | Seats % | Other | Total | Total % | Votes | Votes % | +/− |
|---|---|---|---|---|---|---|---|---|---|
| Liberal Democrats | 9 | ▲1 | 60.0 | 14 | 23 | 54.8 | 12,294 | 40.6 | |
| Labour | 5 | Steady | 33.3 | 12 | 17 | 40.5 | 8,821 | 29.1 | |
| Conservative | 1 | ▼1 | 6.7 | 1 | 2 | 4.8 | 6,455 | 21.3 | |
| Green | 0 | Steady | 0.0 | 0 | 0 | 0.0 | 2,220 | 7.3 | |
| UKIP | 0 | Steady | 0.0 | 0 | 0 | 0.0 | 255 | 0.8 | |
| Socialist Alliance | 0 | Steady | 0.0 | 0 | 0 | 0.0 | 145 | 0.5 | |
| Independent | 0 | Steady | 0.0 | 0 | 0 | 0.0 | 74 | 0.2 | |

== Ward results ==
=== Abbey ===
Abbey
| Party | Candidate | Votes | % | ±% |
|---|---|---|---|---|
| Labour | Caroline Hart | 571 | 58.6 | |
| Conservative | Simon Mitton | 180 | 18.5 | |
| Liberal Democrats | Chris Keating | 113 | 11.6 | |
| Green | John Collins | 60 | 6.2 | |
| Independent | Mungai Mbaya | 51 | 5.2 | |
| Majority | | 391 | 40.1 | |
| Turnout | | 975 | 20.6 | |
| Labour hold | | Swing | | |

=== Arbury ===
Arbury
| Party | Candidate | Votes | % | ±% |
|---|---|---|---|---|
| Labour | Michael Todd-Jones | 828 | 41.0 | |
| Liberal Democrats | Rupert Moss-Eccardt | 579 | 28.7 | |
| Conservative | Robert Boorman | 513 | 25.4 | |
| Green | Shayne Mitchell | 73 | 3.6 | |
| Socialist Alliance | Diana Minns | 27 | 1.3 | |
| Majority | | 249 | 12.3 | |
| Turnout | | 2,020 | 39.8 | |
| Labour hold | | Swing | | |

=== Castle ===
Castle
| Party | Candidate | Votes | % | ±% |
|---|---|---|---|---|
| Liberal Democrats | David White | 1,121 | 51.4 | |
| Conservative | Rhona Boorman | 458 | 21.0 | |
| Labour | Gillian Richardson | 412 | 18.9 | |
| Green | Stephen Lawrence | 188 | 8.6 | |
| Majority | | 663 | 30.4 | |
| Turnout | | 2,179 | 31.0 | |
| Liberal Democrats hold | | Swing | | |

=== Cherry Hinton ===
Cherry Hinton
| Party | Candidate | Votes | % | ±% |
|---|---|---|---|---|
| Conservative | Graham Stuart | 1,174 | 49.3 | |
| Labour | Stuart Newbold | 948 | 39.8 | |
| Liberal Democrats | Frances Amrani | 196 | 8.2 | |
| Green | Daryl Tayar | 64 | 2.7 | |
| Majority | | 226 | 9.5 | |
| Turnout | | 2,382 | 44.1 | |
| Conservative hold | | Swing | | |

=== Coleridge ===
Coleridge
| Party | Candidate | Votes | % | ±% |
|---|---|---|---|---|
| Labour | Ruth Bagnall | 938 | 50.6 | |
| Conservative | Martin Hall | 454 | 24.5 | |
| Liberal Democrats | Jonathan Monroe | 267 | 14.4 | |
| Green | Damian Docherty | 94 | 5.1 | |
| UKIP | Albert Watts | 53 | 2.9 | |
| Socialist Alliance | Simon Sedgwick-Jell | 46 | 2.5 | |
| Majority | | 484 | 26.1 | |
| Turnout | | 1,852 | 31.7 | |
| Labour hold | | Swing | | |

=== East Chesterton ===
East Chesterton
| Party | Candidate | Votes | % | ±% |
|---|---|---|---|---|
| Liberal Democrats | Jennifer Bailey | 974 | 40.5 | |
| Labour | Sarah Woodall | 858 | 35.7 | |
| Conservative | Mamanur Rashid | 319 | 13.3 | |
| Green | Neil Hewett | 129 | 5.4 | |
| UKIP | Barry Hudson | 124 | 5.2 | |
| Majority | | 116 | 4.8 | |
| Turnout | | 2,404 | 33.9 | |
| Liberal Democrats hold | | Swing | | |

=== Kings Hedges ===
Kings Hedges
| Party | Candidate | Votes | % | ±% |
|---|---|---|---|---|
| Labour | Maria Bell | 550 | 54.6 | |
| Conservative | Cyril Weinman | 235 | 23.3 | |
| Liberal Democrats | Evelyn Bradford | 157 | 15.6 | |
| Green | Gerhard Goldbeck-Wood | 65 | 6.5 | |
| Majority | | 315 | 31.3 | |
| Turnout | | 1,007 | 21.3 | |
| Labour hold | | Swing | | |

=== Market ===
Market
| Party | Candidate | Votes | % | ±% |
|---|---|---|---|---|
| Liberal Democrats | Joye Rosenstiel | 879 | 57.0 | |
| Conservative | Samuel Chamberlain | 239 | 15.5 | |
| Labour | Michael Sargeant | 238 | 15.4 | |
| Green | Martin Lucas-Smith | 187 | 12.1 | |
| Majority | | 640 | 41.5 | |
| Turnout | | 1,543 | 22.7 | |
| Liberal Democrats hold | | Swing | | |

=== Newnham ===
Newnham
| Party | Candidate | Votes | % | ±% |
|---|---|---|---|---|
| Liberal Democrats | Sian Reid | 1,134 | 55.5 | |
| Labour | Patricia Wright | 372 | 18.2 | |
| Conservative | Richard Normington | 326 | 15.9 | |
| Green | Tandy Harrison | 190 | 9.3 | |
| Independent | Nigel Douglas | 23 | 1.1 | |
| Majority | | 762 | 37.3 | |
| Turnout | | 2,045 | 26.6 | |
| Liberal Democrats hold | | Swing | | |

=== Petersfield ===
Petersfield
| Party | Candidate | Votes | % | ±% |
|---|---|---|---|---|
| Labour | Kevin Blencowe | 964 | 40.4 | |
| Liberal Democrats | Kevin Wilkins | 579 | 24.3 | |
| Green | Margaret Wright | 514 | 21.5 | |
| Conservative | Lee Glendon | 257 | 10.8 | |
| Socialist Alliance | Jonathan Walker | 72 | 3.0 | |
| Majority | | 385 | 16.1 | |
| Turnout | | 2,386 | 30.6 | |
| Labour hold | | Swing | | |

=== Queen Edith's ===
Queen Edith's (2 seats due to by-election)
| Party | Candidate | Votes | % |
|---|---|---|---|
| Liberal Democrats | Amanda Taylor | 1,564 | 62.7 |
| Liberal Democrats | Alan Baker | 1,424 | 57.1 |
| Conservative | Keith Henry | 473 | 19.0 |
| Conservative | James Ray | 409 | 16.4 |
| Labour | Frances Harper | 342 | 13.7 |
| Labour | Jean Stevens | 258 | 10.3 |
| Green | Robert Milsom | 160 | 6.4 |
| UKIP | Helene Davies | 78 | 3.1 |
| Turnout | | 2,494 | 41.4 |
| Liberal Democrats hold | | | |
| Liberal Democrats hold | | | |

=== Romsey ===
Romsey
| Party | Candidate | Votes | % | ±% |
|---|---|---|---|---|
| Liberal Democrats | Catherine Smart | 1,118 | 44.8 | |
| Labour | Paul Sales | 867 | 40.1 | |
| Green | Vicky Russell | 194 | 9.0 | |
| Conservative | Vivian Ellis | 131 | 6.1 | |
| Majority | | 251 | 4.7 | |
| Turnout | | 2,310 | 35.9 | |
| Liberal Democrats hold | | Swing | | |

=== Trumpington ===
Trumpington
| Party | Candidate | Votes | % | ±% |
|---|---|---|---|---|
| Liberal Democrats | Judith Pinnington | 1,118 | 47.5 | |
| Conservative | Hannah Towns | 937 | 39.8 | |
| Labour | Rosemary Turner | 201 | 8.5 | |
| Green | Brian Westcott | 100 | 4.2 | |
| Majority | | 181 | 7.7 | |
| Turnout | | 2,356 | 39.9 | |
| Liberal Democrats gain from Conservative | | Swing | | |

=== West Chesterton ===
West Chesterton
| Party | Candidate | Votes | % | ±% |
|---|---|---|---|---|
| Liberal Democrats | Ian Nimmo-Smith | 1,071 | 51.1 | |
| Labour | Patrick Schicker | 474 | 22.6 | |
| Conservative | James Strachan | 350 | 16.7 | |
| Green | Stephen Peake | 202 | 9.6 | |
| Majority | | 597 | 28.5 | |
| Turnout | | 2,097 | 34.6 | |
| Liberal Democrats hold | | Swing | | |
