= 1998 Cambridge City Council election =

1998 UK local government election

- 7 May 1998

14 out of 42 seats to Cambridge City Council 22 seats needed for a majority
- Turnout: 27.8% (▼8.1%)

	First party	Second party	Third party
Party	Labour	Liberal Democrats	Conservative
Last election	21 seats, 45.0%	17 seats, 35.2%	4 seats, 19.8%
Seats won	5	7	2
Seats after	19	17	6
Seat change	▼2	▲1	▲2
Popular vote	8,572	9,335	5,223
Percentage	36.1%	39.3%	22.0%
Swing	▼8.9%	▲4.1%	▲2.2%
- Winner of each seat at the 1998 Cambridge City Council election
Council control before election
No overall control
Council control after election
No overall control

The 1998 Cambridge City Council election took place on 7 May 1998 to elect members of Cambridge City Council in Cambridge, Cambridgeshire, England. This was on the same day as other local elections across England.

Prior to the election, Cllr Alan Charlesworth (Castle) left the Liberal Democrats to sit as an independent.

== Summary ==
=== Election result ===
1998 Cambridge City Council election
Party	This election				Full council			This election		
Party	Candidates	Seats	Net	Seats %	Other	Total	Total %	Votes	Votes %	+/−
Labour	{{{candidates}}}	5	▼2	35.7	14	19	45.2	8,572	36.1	–8.9
Liberal Democrats	{{{candidates}}}	7	▲1	50.0	10	17	40.5	9,335	39.3	+4.1
Conservative	{{{candidates}}}	2	▲2	14.3	4	6	14.3	5,223	22.0	+2.2
Green	{{{candidates}}}	0	Steady	0.0	0	0	0.0	616	2.6	N/A

In addition to the gains/losses above, one Independent lost a seat but is not shown as no Independent candidates stood at this election.

== Ward results ==
=== Abbey ===
Abbey
Party	Candidate	Votes	%	±%
Labour	Mungai Mbayah	578	65.0	–6.5
Conservative	Ann Watkins	163	18.3	+2.1
Liberal Democrats	Catherine Stebbings	148	16.6	+4.4
Majority		415	46.7	–8.6
Turnout		889	19.0	–6.4
Registered electors		4,668		
Labour hold		Swing	▼4.3	

=== Arbury ===
Arbury
Party	Candidate	Votes	%	±%
Labour	Anthony Schofield*	676	53.2	–1.7
Conservative	Mark Taylor	395	31.1	–3.5
Liberal Democrats	Rhordi James	199	15.7	+5.1
Majority		281	22.1	+1.8
Turnout		1,270	25.2	–11.6
Registered electors		5,057		
Labour hold		Swing	▲0.9	

=== Castle ===
Castle
Party	Candidate	Votes	%	±%
Liberal Democrats	David White	1,172	60.4	+4.6
Labour	Stephen Hartley	365	18.8	–8.1
Conservative	Richard Hollie	293	15.1	–2.2
Green	Marion Barber	112	5.8	N/A
Majority		807	41.6	–12.7
Turnout		1,942	27.7	–8.4
Registered electors		7,036		
Liberal Democrats gain from Independent		Swing	▲6.4	

=== Cherry Hinton ===
Cherry Hinton
Party	Candidate	Votes	%	±%
Conservative	Graham Stuart	893	46.6	+19.0
Labour	Richard Carling	862	45.0	–10.4
Liberal Democrats	Ashley Woodford	161	8.4	–8.6
Majority		31	1.6	N/A
Turnout		1,916	34.7	+1.8
Registered electors		5,525		
Conservative gain from Labour		Swing	▲14.7	

=== Coleridge ===
Coleridge
Party	Candidate	Votes	%	±%
Labour	Ruth Bagnall	873	61.7	–0.4
Conservative	Eric Barrett-Payton	363	25.6	+0.4
Liberal Democrats	Richard Folley	180	12.7	–0.1
Majority		510	36.0	–0.9
Turnout		1,416	23.8	–9.5
Registered electors		5,966		
Labour hold		Swing	▼0.4	

=== East Chesterton ===
East Chesterton
Party	Candidate	Votes	%	±%
Liberal Democrats	Fiona Levison	971	44.2	+0.1
Labour	Tricia Charlesworth	903	41.1	–2.2
Conservative	Colin Havercroft	324	14.7	+2.0
Majority		68	3.1	+2.3
Turnout		2,198	32.1	–9.4
Registered electors		6,867		
Liberal Democrats hold		Swing	▲1.2	

=== Kings Hedges ===
Kings Hedges
Party	Candidate	Votes	%	±%
Labour	Michael Talbot	613	65.1	–11.9
Conservative	Christopher Howell	177	18.8	+5.2
Liberal Democrats	Tim Wesson	151	16.0	+6.6
Majority		436	46.3	–17.1
Turnout		941	19.8	–9.7
Registered electors		4,774		
Labour hold		Swing	▼8.6	

=== Market ===
Market
Party	Candidate	Votes	%	±%
Liberal Democrats	Joye Rosenstiel*	837	60.5	+4.6
Labour	Andrew Jones	288	20.8	–12.8
Conservative	Julie-Ann Ing	154	11.1	+0.7
Green	Adam Swallow	105	7.6	N/A
Majority		549	39.7	+17.4
Turnout		1,384	21.1	–11.5
Registered electors		6,595		
Liberal Democrats hold		Swing	▲8.7	

=== Newnham ===
Newnham
Party	Candidate	Votes	%	±%
Liberal Democrats	Christopher Larkin*	1,041	59.2	+15.1
Labour	Trevor Critchlow	473	26.9	–18.4
Conservative	James Strachan	243	13.8	+3.2
Majority		568	32.3	+31.1
Turnout		1,757	22.3	–13.0
Registered electors		7,929		
Liberal Democrats hold		Swing	▲16.8	

=== Petersfield ===
Petersfield
Party	Candidate	Votes	%	±%
Labour	Kevin Blencowe*	865	55.1	–7.3
Liberal Democrats	Stephen Smith	262	16.7	–8.4
Green	Shayne Mitchell	248	15.8	N/A
Conservative	Peter Welton	196	12.5	–0.1
Majority		603	38.4	+1.1
Turnout		1,571	21.9	–11.7
Registered electors		7,181		
Labour hold		Swing	▲0.6	

=== Queens Edith ===
Queens Edith
Party	Candidate	Votes	%	±%
Liberal Democrats	Amanda Taylor*	1,394	54.8	+17.7
Conservative	Richard Williams	802	31.5	–6.2
Labour	Kira Davison	349	13.7	–11.5
Majority		592	23.3	N/A
Turnout		2,545	41.7	–8.9
Registered electors		6,107		
Liberal Democrats hold		Swing	▲12.0	

=== Romsey ===
Romsey
Party	Candidate	Votes	%	±%
Liberal Democrats	Catherine Smart	1,027	48.8	+9.4
Labour	Paul Gilchrist	887	42.1	–13.4
Green	Hamish Downer	114	5.4	N/A
Conservative	Peter Whitehead	77	3.7	–1.4
Majority		140	6.7	N/A
Turnout		2,105	33.9	–1.6
Registered electors		6,107		
Liberal Democrats gain from Labour		Swing	▲11.4	

=== Trumpington ===
Trumpington
Party	Candidate	Votes	%	±%
Conservative	Donald Douglas	910	45.0	+7.1
Liberal Democrats	Michael Dixon	819	40.5	–0.7
Labour	Patrick Diamond	294	14.5	–6.3
Majority		91	4.5	N/A
Turnout		2,023	34.7	–0.1
Registered electors		5,837		
Conservative gain from Liberal Democrats		Swing	▲3.9	

=== West Chesterton ===
West Chesterton
Party	Candidate	Votes	%	±%
Liberal Democrats	Ian Nimmo-Smith*	973	51.4	–1.7
Labour	Patrick Schicker	546	28.8	–4.0
Conservative	Vivian Ellis	233	12.3	–1.7
Green	Margaret Wright	142	7.5	N/A
Majority		427	22.5	+2.2
Turnout		1,894	31.3	–7.5
Registered electors		6,064		
Liberal Democrats hold		Swing	▲1.2	
