= 2025 Cambridgeshire County Council election =

2025 UK local government election

- 1 May 2025

All 61 seats to Cambridgeshire County Council 31 seats needed for a majority
- Registered: 499,001
- Turnout: 36.1% (▼3.0 pp)
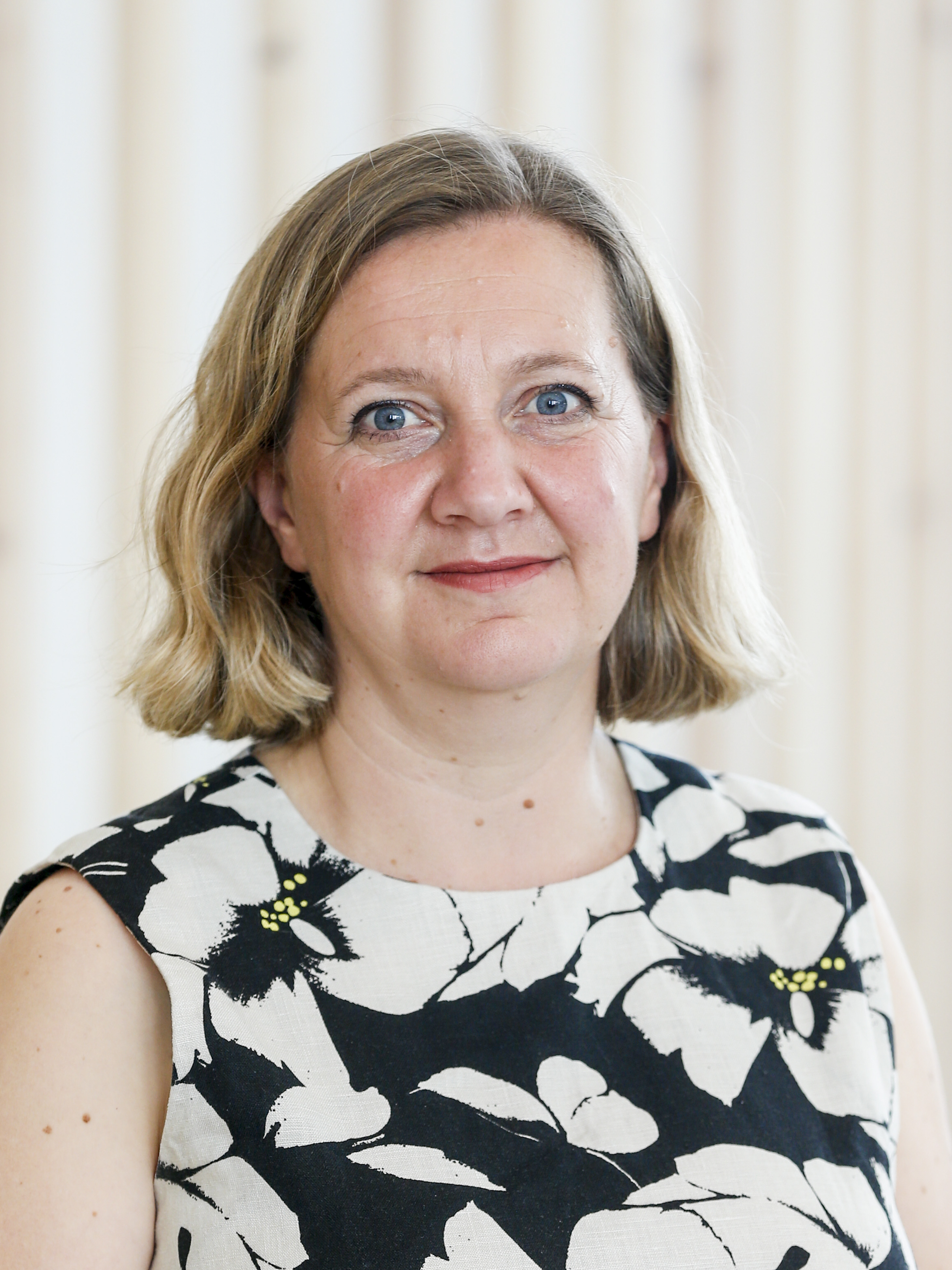

	First party	Second party	Third party
Leader	Lucy Nethsingha	Steve Count (defeated)	none
Party	Liberal Democrats	Conservative	Reform
Leader's seat	Cambourne (Note: Nethsingha was the councillor for Newnham but ran in Cambourne in the 2025 election.)	March North & Waldersey	none
Last election	20 seats, 28.1%	28 seats, 39.5%	did not stand
Seats before	22	23	0
Seats won	31	10	10
Seat change	▲11	▼18	▲10
Popular vote	50,919	44,083	42,697
Percentage	27.4%	23.7%	23.0%
Swing	▼1.2 pp	▼15.3 pp	did not stand
	Fourth party	Fifth party	Sixth party
Leader	Elisa Meschini	none	none
Party	Labour	Green	Independent
Leader's seat	King's Hedges	none	none
Last election	9 seats, 19.2%	0 seats, 9.3%	4 seats, 3.9%
Seats before	10	0	2
Seats won	5	3	2
Seat change	▼4	▲3	▼2
Popular vote	24,431	19,315	4,207
Percentage	13.2%	10.4%	2.3%
Swing	▼5.9 pp	▲1.0 pp	▼1.5 pp
Leader before election
Lucy Nethsingha
Liberal Democrats
No overall control
Leader after election
Lucy Nethsingha
Liberal Democrats

The 2025 Cambridgeshire County Council election took place on 1 May 2025 as part of the 2025 local elections in the United Kingdom. All 61 councillors were elected from 59 electoral divisions, which returned either one or two county councillors each by first-past-the-post voting for a four-year term of office. The election was held alongside the election of a Mayor of Cambridgeshire and Peterborough. The council was under no overall control prior to the election. The election saw the Liberal Democrats win a majority of the seats on the council for the first time.

== Previous council composition ==
Prior to the election, the council was under no overall control, being run by a joint Liberal Democrat, Labour and independent administration, led by Lucy Nethsingha, a Liberal Democrat.

After 2021 election		Before 2025 election	
Party	Seats	Party	Seats
Liberal Democrats	20	Liberal Democrats	23
Conservative	28	Conservative	21
Labour	9	Labour	10
The St Neots Independent Group	2	The St Neots Independent Group	1
Independent	2	Independent	6

== Summary ==
The Liberal Democrats won 31 of the 61 seats on the council, giving them an overall majority on the council for the first time.

=== Election result ===
2025 Cambridgeshire County Council election
Party	Candidates	Seats	Gains	Losses	Net gain/loss	Seats %	Votes %	Votes	+/−
Liberal Democrats	61	31	12	1	▲11	50.8	27.4	50,919	–1.2
Conservative	61	10	0	18	▼18	16.4	23.7	44,083	–15.3
Reform	61	10	10	0	▲10	16.4	23.0	42,697	N/A
Labour	61	5	1	5	▼4	8.2	13.2	24,431	–5.9
Green	61	3	3	0	▲3	4.9	10.4	19,315	+1.0
Independent	9	2	1	3	▼2	3.3	2.3	4,207	–1.5
Party of Women	1	0	0	0	Steady	0.0	0.03	50	N/A

== Results by division ==
=== Cambridge ===
Cambridge city and district shown within Cambridgeshire

Cambridge district summary
Party	Seats	+/-	Votes	%	+/-
Liberal Democrats	5	▲2	7,904	23.8	–3.7
Labour	4	▼5	10,117	30.4	–11.5
Green	3	▲3	7,890	23.7	+7.2
Conservative	0	Steady	3,959	11.9	–2.2
Reform UK	0	Steady	3,242	9.8	N/A
Independent	0	Steady	123	0.4	N/A
Total	12	Steady	33,235	38.4	
Registered electors			86,551	–	

Division results

Abbey
Party	Candidate	Votes	%	±%
Green	Elliot Tong	1,113	48.7	+14.5
Labour	Tom Ron	470	20.6	–21.2
Reform	Dave Bunting	325	14.2	N/A
Conservative	David Smith	192	8.4	–3.7
Liberal Democrats	Rosy Ansell	186	8.1	–3.9
Majority		643	28.1	N/A
Turnout		2,286	33.5	–5.2
Registered electors		6,834		
Green gain from Labour		Swing	▲17.9	

Arbury
Party	Candidate	Votes	%	±%
Labour	Mike Black	941	37.1	–11.0
Liberal Democrats	Fionna Tod	477	18.8	–2.8
Green	Robin Brabham	418	16.5	+3.1
Conservative	Robert Boorman	356	14.1	–2.8
Reform	Andrew O'Neil	342	13.5	N/A
Majority		464	18.3	–8.2
Turnout		2,534	36.2	–4.7
Registered electors		6,994		
Labour hold		Swing	▼4.1	

Castle
Party	Candidate	Votes	%	±%
Liberal Democrats	Rory Clark	943	34.3	+0.8
Labour	Elizabeth McWilliams	884	32.2	–8.5
Green	Katyuli Lloyd	581	21.2	+4.9
Reform	Roger Outram	172	6.3	N/A
Conservative	Dace Ruklisa	166	6.1	–3.5
Majority		59	2.1	N/A
Turnout		2,746	44.9	–4.3
Registered electors		6,112		
Liberal Democrats gain from Labour		Swing		

Cherry Hinton
Party	Candidate	Votes	%	±%
Labour	Bryony Goodliffe*	1,101	35.4	–13.2
Conservative	Eric Barrett-Payton	633	20.3	–5.6
Reform	Sam Altham	540	17.3	N/A
Green	Sarah Nicmanis	516	16.6	+2.9
Liberal Democrats	Robert Pinsker	325	10.4	–1.4
Majority		468	15.1	–7.6
Turnout		3,115	37.3	–2.9
Registered electors		8,350		
Labour hold		Swing	▼3.8	

Chesterton
Party	Candidate	Votes	%	±%
Liberal Democrats	Ian Manning	1,254	33.6	–3.0
Labour	Jocelynne Scutt	1,244	33.4	–6.5
Green	Hannah Copley	650	17.4	+4.8
Reform	Ian Simpson	302	8.1	N/A
Conservative	Michael Harford	278	7.5	–2.7
Majority		10	0.2	N/A
Turnout		3,728	47.0	–4.3
Registered electors		7,924		
Liberal Democrats gain from Labour		Swing	▲1.8	

King's Hedges
Party	Candidate	Votes	%	±%
Labour	Elisa Meschini*	908	30.9	–18.3
Conservative	Delowar Hossain	638	21.7	+5.0
Liberal Democrats	Bob Illingworth	490	16.7	–2.3
Green	Peter Griffin	400	13.6	–1.4
Reform	Sarah Hurcum	379	12.9	N/A
Independent	David Carmona	123	4.2	N/A
Majority		270	9.2	–21.1
Turnout		2,938	34.5	–0.4
Registered electors		8,506		
Labour hold		Swing	▼11.7	

Market
Party	Candidate	Votes	%	±%
Liberal Democrats	Alex Beckett	595	41.6	+7.9
Labour	Nick Gay*	389	27.2	–10.4
Green	Esme Hennessy	302	21.1	+2.5
Reform	Pia Taylor	73	5.1	N/A
Conservative	Panda Xiong	70	4.9	–5.1
Majority		206	14.1	N/A
Turnout		1,429	32.9	–1.2
Registered electors		4,337		
Liberal Democrats gain from Labour		Swing	▲9.2	

Newnham
Party	Candidate	Votes	%	±%
Green	Peter Rees	887	51.2	+34.6
Labour	Yvonne Nobis	363	21.0	–12.4
Liberal Democrats	David Grace	268	15.5	–26.2
Conservative	Poppy Simister-Thomas	143	8.3	–0.2
Reform	Peter Dorken	72	4.2	N/A
Majority		524	30.2	N/A
Turnout		1,733	41.3	+0.7
Registered electors		4,199		
Green gain from Liberal Democrats		Swing	▲23.5	

Petersfield
Party	Candidate	Votes	%	±%
Labour	Richard Howitt*	1,221	40.2	–8.3
Green	Matthew Howard	791	26.1	+10.6
Liberal Democrats	Sam Oliver	581	19.1	–6.9
Conservative	Paul Roper	252	8.3	–1.7
Reform	Heather Petters	191	6.3	N/A
Majority		430	14.1	–8.3
Turnout		3,036	38.0	–8.3
Registered electors		7,983		
Labour hold		Swing	▼9.4	

Queen Ediths
Party	Candidate	Votes	%	±%
Liberal Democrats	Karen Young	1,258	40.1	+4.1
Labour	Janet O'Keefe	633	20.2	–10.8
Green	Jacqui Whitmore	482	15.4	–0.5
Conservative	Donald Douglas	472	15.0	–2.1
Reform	Gerard Eldridge	293	9.3	N/A
Majority		625	19.9	+14.9
Turnout		3,138	40.7	–8.2
Registered electors		7,707		
Liberal Democrats hold		Swing	▲7.5	

Romsey
Party	Candidate	Votes	%	±%
Green	Darren Green	1,355	37.9	+19.3
Labour	Neil Shailer*	1,237	34.6	–18.5
Liberal Democrats	John Walmsley	416	11.7	–3.9
Conservative	Robert Nelson	286	8.0	–4.6
Reform	Jon Pacitti	278	7.8	N/A
Majority		118	3.3	N/A
Turnout		3,572	39.5	–3.4
Registered electors		9,033		
Green gain from Labour		Swing	▲18.9	

Trumpington
Party	Candidate	Votes	%	±%
Liberal Democrats	David Levien	1,111	37.3	–4.4
Labour	Carlos Toranzos	726	24.4	–3.9
Conservative	Steve George	473	15.9	–2.6
Green	Chloe Mosonyi	395	13.3	+1.7
Reform	Karan Maheshwari	275	9.2	N/A
Majority		385	12.9	–0.6
Turnout		2,980	34.8	–6.6
Registered electors		8,572		
Liberal Democrats hold		Swing	▼0.3	

=== East Cambridgeshire ===
East Cambridgeshire district shown within Cambridgeshire

East Cambridgeshire district summary
Party	Seats	+/-	Votes	%	+/-
Liberal Democrats	6	▲3	8,589	36.5	+2.3
Reform UK	1	▲1	5,896	25.1	N/A
Conservative	1	▼4	5,762	24.5	–19.7
Green	0	Steady	1,677	7.1	+0.7
Labour	0	Steady	1,625	6.7	–8.5
Total	8	Steady	23,504	34.5	
Registered electors			68,484	–	

Division results

Burwell
Party	Candidate	Votes	%	±%
Liberal Democrats	Yannifer Malinowski	940	30.3	+5.0
Reform	Martyn Cubitt	856	27.6	N/A
Conservative	James Wood	752	24.3	–27.3
Green	FloraMay Waterhouse	301	9.7	N/A
Labour	Clive Leach	250	8.1	–15.0
Majority		84	2.7	N/A
Turnout		3,099	33.4	–0.4
Registered electors		9,281		
Liberal Democrats gain from Conservative				

Ely North
Party	Candidate	Votes	%	±%
Liberal Democrats	Alison Whelan*	1,411	48.4	+6.2
Reform	Fred Hargreaves	553	19.0	N/A
Conservative	Charlie Flude	493	16.9	–20.0
Labour	Tom Lacy	252	8.6	–4.1
Green	Tessa Harding	209	7.2	–1.0
Majority		858	29.4	+24.2
Turnout		2,932	37.3	–4.3
Registered electors		7,860		
Liberal Democrats hold				

Ely South
Party	Candidate	Votes	%	±%
Liberal Democrats	Christine Whelan	1,551	47.6	+1.9
Conservative	David Ambrose Smith	644	19.8	–9.3
Reform	Wayne Stocker	519	15.9	N/A
Labour	Sarah Fraser	293	9.0	–7.0
Green	Ed Perrin	253	7.8	–1.6
Majority		907	27.8	+11.2
Turnout		3,285	40.7	–6.1
Registered electors		8,038		
Liberal Democrats hold		Swing	▲5.6	

Littleport
Party	Candidate	Votes	%	±%
Reform	John Wells	675	34.9	N/A
Conservative	Martin Goodearl	489	25.3	–28.5
Liberal Democrats	Lee Denney	426	22.0	+7.1
Labour	Rebecca Denness	218	11.3	–10.3
Green	Paul Osborne	129	6.7	–3.1
Majority		186	9.6	N/A
Turnout		1,948	26.0	+2.6
Registered electors		7,499		
Reform gain from Conservative				

Soham North & Isleham
Party	Candidate	Votes	%	±%
Conservative	Mark Goldsack*	903	38.3	–24.6
Reform	John Setchell	733	31.1	N/A
Liberal Democrats	Sarah Marsh	395	16.8	+0.7
Labour	Tom Thorpe	170	7.2	–7.5
Green	Darren Curtis	157	6.7	+0.3
Majority		170	7.2	–39.7
Turnout		2,373	28.1	–1.5
Registered electors		8,452		
Conservative hold				

Soham South & Haddenham
Party	Candidate	Votes	%	±%
Liberal Democrats	Tom Hawker-Dawson	1,110	32.1	+8.6
Conservative	Bill Hunt	1,029	29.8	–21.7
Reform	Ryan Coogan	883	25.6	N/A
Green	David Woricker	281	8.1	+0.6
Labour	Rosy Plaistow	152	4.4	–13.2
Majority		81	2.3	N/A
Turnout		3,466	37.0	+1.6
Registered electors		9,381		
Liberal Democrats gain from Conservative		Swing	▲15.2	

Sutton
Party	Candidate	Votes	%	±%
Liberal Democrats	Lorna Dupre*	1,642	47.7	–17.6
Reform	Robin Wells	960	27.9	N/A
Conservative	Lucius Vellacott	542	15.7	–13.7
Green	Ray Harding	180	5.2	N/A
Labour	Dominic Myers	119	3.5	–1.8
Majority		682	19.8	–16.1
Turnout		3,454	36.9	–0.9
Registered electors		9,364		
Liberal Democrats hold				

Woodditton
Party	Candidate	Votes	%	±%
Liberal Democrats	Jonny Edge	1,114	36.2	+11.6
Conservative	Alan Sharp*	910	29.6	–20.8
Reform	Daniel Baxter	717	23.3	N/A
Labour	Steven O'Dell	171	5.6	–8.7
Green	Andy Cogan	167	5.4	–5.4
Majority		204	6.6	N/A
Turnout		3,085	35.8	–2.4
Registered electors		8,609		
Liberal Democrats gain from Conservative		Swing	▲16.2	

=== Fenland ===
Fenland district shown within Cambridgeshire

Fenland district summary
Party	Seats	+/-	Votes	%	+/-
Reform UK	6	▲6	11,088	40.0	N/A
Conservative	3	▼6	9,815	35.4	–27.6
Labour	0	Steady	2,500	9.0	–7.3
Liberal Democrats	0	Steady	2,282	8.2	+0.9
Green	0	Steady	1,277	4.6	–0.2
Independent	0	Steady	756	2.7	–5.0
Total	9	Steady	27,718	29.7	
Registered electors			76,445	–	

Division results

Chatteris
Party	Candidate	Votes	%	±%
Reform	Daniel Divine	941	41.0	N/A
Conservative	Anne Hay*	781	34.1	–25.1
Labour	Jay Eames	266	11.6	–5.7
Liberal Democrats	Janet Porter	167	7.3	N/A
Green	Emma Pollard	138	6.0	–0.6
Majority		160	6.9	N/A
Turnout		2,293	27.6	–1.1
Registered electors		8,310		
Reform gain from Conservative				

March North & Waldersey (2 seats)
Party	Candidate	Votes	%	±%
Reform	Stefan Fisher	2,105	42.3	N/A
Reform	Colin Galbraith	1,928	38.7	N/A
Conservative	Steve Count*	1,800	36.1	–20.2
Conservative	Elisabeth Sennitt Clough	1,224	24.6	–33.1
Labour	Martin Field	603	12.1	–8.3
Liberal Democrats	Stephen Court	523	10.5	–1.9
Labour	Hannah Orbell	507	10.2	–2.7
Independent	Dal Roy	385	7.7	N/A
Liberal Democrats	Diane Cutler	378	7.6	N/A
Green	Elizabeth May	265	5.3	–3.3
Green	Simon Wilkes	242	4.9	–2.5
Turnout		~4,980	27.5	–0.9
Registered electors		18,096		
Reform gain from Conservative				
Reform gain from Conservative				

March South & Rural
Party	Candidate	Votes	%	±%
Reform	Christopher Thornhill	1,056	38.0	N/A
Conservative	Gary Christy	1,053	37.9	–30.6
Labour	Peter Bimson	268	9.7	–8.4
Liberal Democrats	Christopher Ross	247	8.9	+1.7
Green	Andrew Crawford	154	5.5	–0.6
Majority		3	0.1	N/A
Turnout		2,778	32.3	+0.5
Registered electors		8,606		
Reform gain from Conservative				

Roman Bank & Peckover
Party	Candidate	Votes	%	±%
Reform	Andy Osborn	1,398	44.6	N/A
Conservative	Simon King*	919	29.3	–28.3
Liberal Democrats	Jack Wheelan	600	19.1	–10.7
Labour	Amanda Hirson	122	3.9	–4.2
Green	Lucy Mance	97	3.1	–1.5
Majority		479	15.3	N/A
Turnout		3,136	34.0	+1.0
Registered electors		9,214		
Reform gain from Conservative				

In May 2026, Cllr Osborn was disqualified from office after having been convicted for breaking electoral law.

Whittlesey North
Party	Candidate	Votes	%	±%
Conservative	Chris Boden*	1,215	46.4	–29.0
Reform	Kevin Marston	947	36.2	N/A
Labour	Angela Howe	213	8.1	–12.8
Green	John Male	144	5.5	N/A
Liberal Democrats	Clare Delderfield	97	3.7	±0.0
Majority		268	10.2	–44.2
Turnout		2,616	30.4	–3.3
Registered electors		8,600		
Conservative hold				

Whittlesey South
Party	Candidate	Votes	%	±%
Reform	Michael Fisher	1,191	39.4	N/A
Conservative	Haq Nawaz	975	32.3	–28.8
Independent	Barry Wainwright	371	12.3	N/A
Labour	Katharine Bultitude	240	8.0	–9.6
Liberal Democrats	Stephen Newton	137	4.5	N/A
Green	Liliya Masharova	106	3.5	–1.7
Majority		216	7.1	N/A
Turnout		3,020	33.9	+1.2
Registered electors		8,903		
Reform gain from Conservative				

Wisbech East
Party	Candidate	Votes	%	±%
Conservative	Samantha Hoy*	974	45.8	–16.9
Reform	Nick Brooks	871	40.9	N/A
Labour	Didem Ucuncu	140	6.6	–6.6
Liberal Democrats	Joshua Lee	81	3.8	–1.7
Green	Toby Ensch	63	3.0	N/A
Majority		103	4.9	–41.2
Turnout		2,129	28.3	+0.3
Registered electors		7,517		
Conservative hold				

Wisbech West
Party	Candidate	Votes	%	±%
Conservative	Steve Tierney*	874	48.9	–8.5
Reform	George Harwin	651	36.5	N/A
Labour	George Broughton	141	7.9	–3.2
Green	Bob Ensch	68	3.8	N/A
Liberal Democrats	Chang Liu	52	2.9	N/A
Majority		223	12.4	–20.4
Turnout		1,786	24.8	+0.6
Registered electors		7,199		
Conservative hold				

=== Huntingdonshire ===
Huntingdonshire district shown within Cambridgeshire

Huntingdonshire district summary
Party	Seats	+/-	Votes	%	+/-
Conservative	6	▼6	12,826	27.6	–22.2
Liberal Democrats	5	▲4	10,205	21.9	+5.4
Reform UK	3	▲3	12,951	27.8	N/A
Independent	2	▼2	2,781	6.0	–5.1
Labour	1	▲1	4,628	9.9	–6.3
Green	0	Steady	3,091	6.6	+0.7
Party of Women	0	Steady	50	0.1	N/A
Total	17	Steady	46,532	33.5	
Registered electors			139,574	–	

Division results

Alconbury & Kimbolton
Party	Candidate	Votes	%	±%
Conservative	Ian Gardener*	1,510	46.7	–21.3
Reform	Simon Taylor	909	28.1	N/A
Liberal Democrats	James Catmur	350	10.8	–3.2
Labour	Harry Denman	263	8.1	–0.7
Green	Tom Allard	202	6.3	–2.9
Majority		601	18.6	–35.4
Turnout		3,254	39.9	–3.3
Registered electors		8,163		
Conservative hold				

Brampton & Buckden
Party	Candidate	Votes	%	±%
Liberal Democrats	Liam Beckett	1,172	35.4	–3.1
Conservative	Catherine Grigg	868	26.2	–17.2
Reform	Luke Saunders	775	23.4	N/A
Green	Chip Colquhoun	252	7.6	+1.6
Labour	Stuart Holder	246	7.4	–4.7
Majority		304	9.2	N/A
Turnout		3,323	34.8	–4.1
Registered electors		9,550		
Liberal Democrats gain from Conservative		Swing	▲7.1	

Godmanchester & Huntingdon South
Party	Candidate	Votes	%	±%
Liberal Democrats	Graham Wilson*	1,008	37.9	–8.2
Conservative	Paula Sparling	648	24.3	–11.2
Reform	Stephen Spencer	583	21.9	N/A
Labour	Bill Hennessy	238	8.9	–8.1
Green	Georgie Hunt	186	7.0	N/A
Majority		360	13.6	+3.2
Turnout		2,663	32.9	–4.0
Registered electors		8,120		
Liberal Democrats hold		Swing	▲1.5	

Huntingdon North & Hartford
Party	Candidate	Votes	%	±%
Conservative	Leedo George	703	26.9	–12.1
Liberal Democrats	Jo Harvey	699	26.7	+1.6
Reform	Sarah Smith	687	26.2	N/A
Labour	Luke Viner	431	16.5	–15.3
Green	Colin Coe	98	3.7	N/A
Majority		4	0.2	–7.0
Turnout		2,630	31.7	–0.2
Registered electors		8,309		
Conservative hold		Swing	▼6.9	

Huntingdon West
Party	Candidate	Votes	%	±%
Independent	Tom Sanderson*	917	43.2	–12.6
Reform	Malcolm Ryman	380	17.9	N/A
Conservative	Phil Pearce	359	16.9	–2.4
Labour	Sam Wakeford	253	11.9	–13.0
Green	Sandra Archer	124	5.8	N/A
Liberal Democrats	William Tilbrook	90	4.2	N/A
Majority		537	25.3	–5.0
Turnout		2,134	28.1	–6.6
Registered electors		7,587		
Independent hold				

Ten months after his election, Councillor Sanderson joined the Liberal Democrats.

Ramsey & Bury
Party	Candidate	Votes	%	±%
Reform	Jim Sidlow	1,357	47.0	N/A
Conservative	Adela Costello*	849	29.4	–35.2
Labour	Sebastian O'Keefe	315	10.9	–4.8
Liberal Democrats	Ganesh Sittampalam	195	6.8	N/A
Green	Will Taylor	173	6.0	N/A
Majority		508	17.6	N/A
Turnout		2,902	33.1	+0.5
Registered electors		8,775		
Reform gain from Conservative				

At the end of May 2026, Cllr Sidlow resigned citing personal circumstances.

St Ives North & Wyton
Party	Candidate	Votes	%	±%
Independent	Julie Kerr	749	28.5	N/A
Reform	Noah Sanderson	658	25.0	N/A
Conservative	Martin Gill	509	19.4	–31.6
Labour	Sajjad Khan	358	13.6	–5.7
Liberal Democrats	Keith Brown	213	8.1	–0.4
Green	Tom Hoeksma	143	5.4	–8.4
Majority		91	3.5	N/A
Turnout		2,638	33.2	+2.6
Registered electors		7,940		
Independent gain from Conservative				

St Ives South & Needingworth
Party	Candidate	Votes	%	±%
Labour	Alex Bulat	676	23.1	+4.2
Liberal Democrats	Nic Wells	588	20.1	–5.0
Conservative	Craig Smith	585	20.0	–25.8
Reform	Mark Turley	562	19.2	N/A
Independent	Kevin Reynolds*	342	11.7	N/A
Green	Chris Smith	168	5.8	–4.5
Majority		88	3.0	N/A
Turnout		2,930	36.1	–1.9
Registered electors		8,109		
Labour gain from Conservative		Swing	▲4.6	

St Neots East & Gransden
Party	Candidate	Votes	%	±%
Liberal Democrats	Sarah Caine	648	30.4	N/A
Green	Lara Davenport-Ray	633	29.7	+17.6
Reform	Fiona Caldwell	437	20.5	N/A
Conservative	Ari Laakkonen	313	14.7	–23.6
Labour	Keith Prentice*	98	4.6	–6.1
Majority		15	0.7	N/A
Turnout		2,135	34.5	–4.8
Registered electors		6,182		
Liberal Democrats gain from Independent				

St Neots Eynesbury
Party	Candidate	Votes	%	±%
Reform	Ricky Ioannides	687	31.9	N/A
Independent	Sam Smith	486	22.5	N/A
Liberal Democrats	Keith Harrison	361	16.7	N/A
Conservative	Adam Roberts	331	15.4	–21.9
Labour	Harvey Woodhouse	149	6.9	–9.3
Green	Catherine Goodman	142	6.6	–0.7
Majority		201	9.4	N/A
Turnout		2,161	27.7	–0.9
Registered electors		7,816		
Reform gain from Independent				

St Neots Priory Park & Little Paxton
Party	Candidate	Votes	%	±%
Liberal Democrats	Robin Wyatt	1,072	39.1	+14.1
Conservative	Richard Tomlinson	705	25.7	–20.9
Reform	Ann Fryer	659	24.0	N/A
Labour	Judith Tustian	156	5.7	–9.5
Green	Tim Neill	151	5.5	–7.8
Majority		367	13.4	N/A
Turnout		2,753	33.5	–0.5
Registered electors		8,215		
Liberal Democrats gain from Conservative		Swing	▲17.5	

St Neots The Eatons
Party	Candidate	Votes	%	±%
Liberal Democrats	Geoff Seeff	1,115	35.5	N/A
Reform	Malcolm Gaylor	1,076	34.3	N/A
Conservative	Nigel Eaton	611	19.5	–17.0
Labour	Ruberta Bisson	163	5.2	–7.7
Green	Andrew Seal	123	3.9	–4.7
Party of Women	Bev White	50	1.6	N/A
Majority		39	1.2	N/A
Turnout		3,151	33.4	–1.5
Registered electors		9,437		
Liberal Democrats gain from Independent				

Sawtry & Stilton
Party	Candidate	Votes	%	±%
Conservative	Simon Bywater*	1,749	50.0	–22.0
Reform	Andy Farmer	1,047	29.9	N/A
Labour	Joy Isaacs	372	10.6	–4.8
Liberal Democrats	Sarah Wilson	183	5.2	–3.6
Green	Peter McEvoy	147	4.2	N/A
Majority		702	20.1	–36.5
Turnout		3,517	36.5	+0.8
Registered electors		9,650		
Conservative hold				

Somersham & Earith
Party	Candidate	Votes	%	±%
Conservative	Charlotte Lowe	832	32.3	–29.9
Reform	Rick Rambridge	665	25.8	N/A
Liberal Democrats	Tony Hulme	364	14.1	–0.4
Independent	Robin Carter	287	11.2	N/A
Labour	Daniel Mayhew	286	11.1	–2.0
Green	Tom Deane	140	5.4	–4.7
Majority		167	6.5	–41.3
Turnout		2,587	33.6	–2.7
Registered electors		7,697		
Conservative hold				

The Hemingfords & Fenstanton
Party	Candidate	Votes	%	±%
Conservative	David Keane	965	33.3	–22.9
Liberal Democrats	David Priestman	907	31.3	+8.7
Reform	Hayley Howatt	649	22.4	N/A
Green	Sam Booker	193	6.7	–2.2
Labour	Rashid Mahmood	181	6.3	–6.0
Majority		58	2.0	–31.7
Turnout		2,915	36.5	–3.6
Registered electors		7,994		
Conservative hold		Swing	▼15.8	

Warboys & The Stukeleys
Party	Candidate	Votes	%	±%
Conservative	Ross Martin	832	35.9	–28.7
Reform	David Blake	732	31.6	N/A
Liberal Democrats	Helen Kewley	319	13.8	–4.0
Labour	Ambrose Ntuk	305	13.2	–4.5
Green	Ruairi Tierney	128	5.5	N/A
Majority		100	4.3	N/A
Turnout		2,335	30.1	–2.0
Registered electors		7,767		
Conservative hold				

Yaxley & Farcet
Party	Candidate	Votes	%	±%
Reform	Des Watt	1,088	40.4	N/A
Liberal Democrats	Andrew Wood*	921	34.2	+8.8
Conservative	Kev Gulson	457	17.0	–39.9
Labour	Steve King	138	5.1	–12.6
Green	David Pardoe	88	3.3	N/A
Majority		167	6.2	N/A
Turnout		2,701	32.7	+5.5
Registered electors		8,263		
Reform gain from Conservative				

Five months after his election, Councillor Watt switched his party status to independent. In January 2026, Watt would briefly join Advance UK, before again becoming an independent in March. Later that August, Watt joined the Conservative Party.

=== South Cambridgeshire ===
South Cambridgeshire district shown within Cambridgeshire

South Cambridgeshire district summary
Party	Seats	+/-	Votes	%	+/-
Liberal Democrats	15	▲2	21,939	40.1	–5.6
Conservative	0	▼2	11,721	21.4	–12.6
Reform UK	0	Steady	9,520	17.4	N/A
Labour	0	Steady	5,606	10.2	+0.6
Green	0	Steady	5,380	9.8	–0.7
Independent	0	Steady	547	1.0	+0.7
Total	15	Steady	48,913	38.2	
Registered electors			127,947	–	

Division results

Bar Hill
Party	Candidate	Votes	%	±%
Liberal Democrats	Edna Murphy*	1,430	50.2	+5.2
Reform	Timothy Scott	508	17.8	N/A
Conservative	Khadijeh Zargar	413	14.5	–25.8
Labour	Simon Patenall	281	9.9	N/A
Green	Portia Northwood-Kilsby	219	7.7	–7.1
Majority		932	32.4	+27.8
Turnout		2,862	40.1	–7.6
Registered electors		7,144		
Liberal Democrats hold				

Cambourne
Party	Candidate	Votes	%	±%
Liberal Democrats	Lucy Nethsingha*	1,127	33.8	+1.7
Conservative	Shrobona Bhattacharya	1,015	30.4	–7.8
Reform	Alison Elcox	594	17.8	N/A
Labour	Jansev Jemal	256	7.7	–12.0
Green	Marcus Pitcaithly	193	5.6	–4.2
Independent	Guy Lachlan	151	4.5	N/A
Majority		112	3.4	N/A
Turnout		3,359	34.6	+0.3
Registered electors		9,712		
Liberal Democrats gain from Conservative		Swing	▲4.8	

Cottenham & Willingham
Party	Candidate	Votes	%	±%
Liberal Democrats	Yasmin Deter	1,250	39.8	–13.4
Reform	Paul Jobling	573	18.2	N/A
Conservative	Lawrence Whitworth	542	17.2	–18.2
Labour	Tom Hingston	512	16.3	N/A
Green	Zak Karimjee	266	8.5	–2.9
Majority		677	21.6	+3.9
Turnout		3,165	35.0	–10.4
Registered electors		9,047		
Liberal Democrats hold				

Duxford
Party	Candidate	Votes	%	±%
Liberal Democrats	Peter McDonald*	1,580	47.0	–1.3
Reform	Paul Smith	701	20.9	N/A
Conservative	Lina Nieto	626	18.6	–22.4
Labour	Clare Downie	260	7.7	N/A
Green	Sophi Berridge	193	5.7	–4.9
Majority		879	26.1	+7.2
Turnout		3,376	40.3	–9.2
Registered electors		8,386		
Liberal Democrats hold				

Fulbourn
Party	Candidate	Votes	%	±%
Liberal Democrats	Matthew Morgan	1,024	34.8	–4.0
Conservative	Harriet Gould	639	21.7	–3.0
Labour	Tim Andrews	521	17.7	–4.2
Reform	Helen Manson	516	17.6	N/A
Green	Ellie Crane	240	8.2	–0.3
Majority		385	13.1	–0.9
Turnout		2,958	39.1	–3.7
Registered electors		7,567		
Liberal Democrats hold		Swing	▼0.5	

Gamlingay
Party	Candidate	Votes	%	±%
Liberal Democrats	James Stuart	1,241	33.5	–16.2
Conservative	Heather Williams	1,234	33.3	–10.5
Reform	Derek Hill	849	22.9	N/A
Labour	John Goodall	203	5.5	N/A
Green	Shayne Mitchell	175	4.7	–1.7
Majority		7	0.2	–5.7
Turnout		3,710	42.4	–4.8
Registered electors		8,758		
Liberal Democrats hold		Swing	▼2.9	

Hardwick
Party	Candidate	Votes	%	±%
Liberal Democrats	Christopher Morris	1,410	36.0	–7.2
Conservative	Chris Carter-Chapman	1,278	32.6	–10.5
Reform	Terry Mannock	563	14.4	N/A
Labour	Joe Beastall	354	9.0	N/A
Green	Hugh Clough	312	8.0	–5.7
Majority		132	3.4	+3.2
Turnout		3,934	41.8	–6.4
Registered electors		9,415		
Liberal Democrats hold		Swing	▲1.7	

Histon & Impington
Party	Candidate	Votes	%	±%
Liberal Democrats	Ros Hathorn*	1,593	45.2	–12.0
Green	Kathryn Fisher	1,091	30.9	+22.6
Reform	Sonia Woodward	353	10.0	N/A
Conservative	Karen Neal	290	8.2	–10.3
Labour	Will Mason	201	5.7	–10.4
Majority		502	14.3	–23.3
Turnout		3,356	39.4	–6.6
Registered electors		8,512		
Liberal Democrats hold		Swing	▼17.3	

Linton
Party	Candidate	Votes	%	±%
Liberal Democrats	Henry Batchelor*	1,584	47.0	–2.5
Reform	Lee Bovington	688	20.4	N/A
Conservative	Robin Pilley	605	18.0	–18.9
Labour	Michael Murray	298	8.9	+1.4
Green	Katy Ensch	193	5.7	–0.5
Majority		896	26.6	+13.9
Turnout		3,382	38.4	–8.8
Registered electors		8,813		
Liberal Democrats hold				

Longstanton, Northstowe & Over
Party	Candidate	Votes	%	±%
Liberal Democrats	Luis Navarro	1,329	42.3	–11.5
Conservative	Tom Bygott	705	22.4	–13.0
Reform	Laszlo Canji	558	17.8	N/A
Labour	Michael Gilks	301	9.6	N/A
Green	Silke Scott-Mance	249	7.9	–2.9
Majority		624	19.9	+1.7
Turnout		3,150	36.5	–8.4
Registered electors		8,621		
Liberal Democrats hold		Swing	▲0.8	

Melbourn & Bassingbourn
Party	Candidate	Votes	%	±%
Liberal Democrats	Adam Bostanci	1,413	47.0	–8.5
Reform	Phyllis Smith	780	25.9	N/A
Conservative	Jonathan Carter-Chapman	478	15.9	–15.9
Labour	Stacey Wilson-Davies	180	6.0	+0.6
Green	Graham Briscoe	158	5.3	–2.2
Majority		633	21.1	–2.7
Turnout		3,017	35.8	–5.7
Registered electors		8,433		
Liberal Democrats hold				

Papworth & Swavesey
Party	Candidate	Votes	%	±%
Liberal Democrats	Chris Poulton	974	34.9	+16.2
Conservative	Mandy Smith*	578	20.7	–25.1
Reform	Hugh Thorogood	554	19.8	N/A
Independent	Mark Howell	396	14.2	N/A
Labour	Basma Greef	162	5.8	–22.6
Green	Tagl	130	4.7	–2.5
Majority		396	14.2	N/A
Turnout		2,817	35.8	–5.2
Registered electors		7,874		
Liberal Democrats gain from Conservative		Swing	▲20.7	

Sawston & Shelford (2 seats)
Party	Candidate	Votes	%	±%
Liberal Democrats	Peter Fane	2,577	40.6	–6.3
Liberal Democrats	Laurence Damary-Homan	2,075	32.7	–8.9
Conservative	Rebecca Shiret	1,411	22.2	–5.9
Conservative	Richard Williams	1,406	22.1	–5.1
Green	Miranda Fyfe	1,085	17.1	+3.2
Reform	John Lamble	926	14.6	N/A
Reform	Brigitta Naunton	813	12.8	N/A
Labour	Uroga Okello	669	10.5	–1.5
Labour	Anand Pillai	655	10.3	+1.3
Green	Daniel Laycock	546	8.6	–1.3
Turnout		6,352	38.8	–8.8
Registered electors		16,387		
Liberal Democrats hold				
Liberal Democrats hold				

Waterbeach
Party	Candidate	Votes	%	±%
Liberal Democrats	Anna Bradnam*	1,332	38.5	+2.5
Labour	James Bull	753	21.8	–4.1
Reform	Rita Anstey	544	15.7	N/A
Conservative	Julia Huffer	501	14.5	–11.4
Green	Steve Bradshaw	330	9.5	–2.8
Majority		579	16.7	+6.6
Turnout		3,475	37.5	–7.5
Registered electors		9,278		
Liberal Democrats hold		Swing	▲3.3	

== Changes 2025–2029 ==
=== Roman Bank & Peckover by-election ===
The by-election was triggered by the disqualification of Reform councillor Andy Osborn, after he was convicted of publishing a false claim about a rival candidate.

Roman Bank & Peckover by-election: 25 June 2026
Party	Candidate	Votes	%	±%
Reform	Chris Tirrell	1,009	39.0	−5.6
Conservative	Jackie Doyle-Price	983	38.0	+8.7
Liberal Democrats	Diane Cutler	414	16.0	−3.1
Labour	Benedict Allen	105	4.1	+0.2
Green	Jonathon Lilley	76	2.9	−0.2
Majority		26	1.0	−14.3
Turnout		2,587	28.25	−5.75
Registered electors		9,214		
Reform hold		Swing	▼7.2	

In an unusual development, about a week before the election the Green candidate announced he no longer wished to stand. However, the date for withdrawal had passed so his name remained on the ballot.

=== Ramsey & Bury by-election ===
The by-election was triggered by the resignation of Reform councillor Jim Sidlow, who cited personal and family pressures.

Ramsey & Bury by-election: 16 July 2026
Party	Candidate	Votes	%	±%
Reform	Howard Tobias	506	29.7	−17.3
Independent	Steve Corney	417	24.5	N/A
Conservative	Adela Costello	412	24.2	−5.2
Liberal Democrats	Sharon Docherty	126	7.4	+0.6
Green	Francis Reid	123	7.2	+1.2
Labour	Neil Shailer	118	6.9	−4.0
Majority		89	5.2	−12.4
Turnout		1,713	19.4	−13.7
Registered electors		8,844		
Reform hold				
