= Grantchester Woodland Railway =

Miniature railway in Cambridgeshire, England

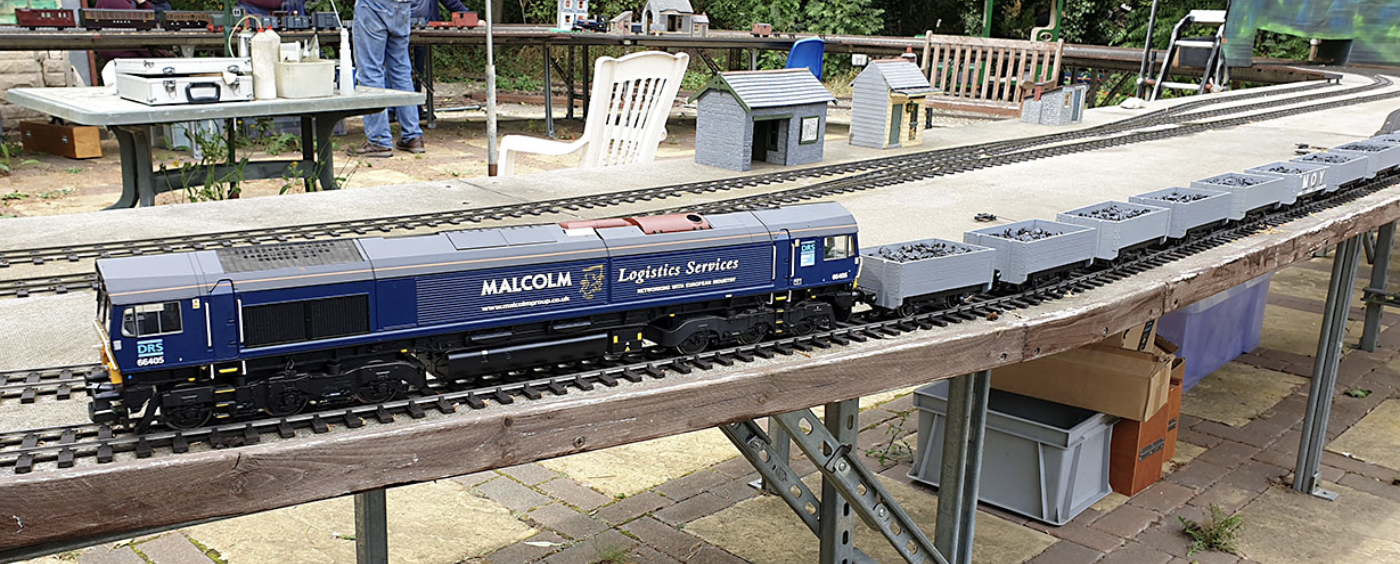
- A view of the garden railway set-up
- Locale: Newnham, Cambridgeshire
- Coordinates: 52.194729°N 0.096749°E
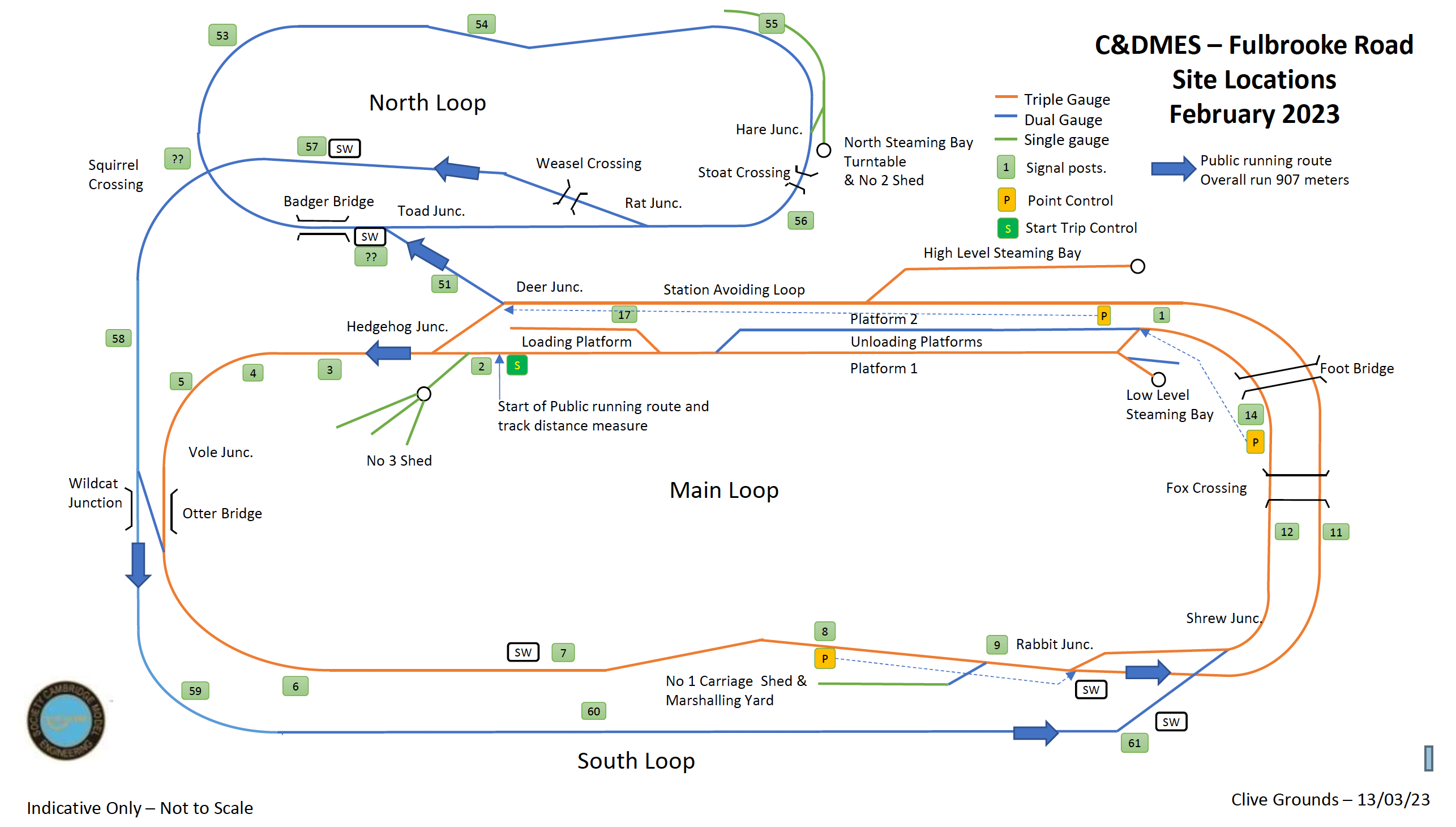
- The layout of the railway

Preserved operations
- Stations: 1
- Length: 1/2 mile (0.8 km)
- Preserved gauge: 7 1/4 in (184 mm), 5 in (127 mm) and 3 1/2 in (89 mm)

Commercial history
- Opened: 1958

Preservation history
- 1938: Society formed
- 1958: Line opened to public
- 2013: Opened the 'North Loop'
- 2020: Opened the 'South Loop' - line extended to its present length

Website
- Grantchester Woodland Railway

The Grantchester Woodland Railway is a 7 1/4 in (184 mm), 5 in (127 mm) and 3 1/2 in (89 mm) ridable miniature railway, in the Newnham area of Cambridge, close to Grantchester. It is owned and operated by the Cambridge Model Engineering Society (CMES) and is affiliated to the Narrow Gauge Railway Society.

Indicators of the significance of the railway include a Trainline URL giving details of how to get there using national rail services. It has been the subject of several dedicated publications, including three in 'The Model Engineer' magazine. An article published in 1955 gave details of the early history of the club, including information about the range of locomotives and carriages available. A few years later, an issue covered the subsequent creation of the public track and included photos of it being opened by Sir Vivian Fuchs. Finally, the main article in a recent issue of the magazine was dedicated to the railway.

== History ==
The Cambridge Model Engineering Society (CMES) has a history extending back over eighty years, since it was formed in 1938 (by fifteen people in the Cambridge area with a common interest in Model Engineering). Early meetings were held in the Old Railway Band Room, off Argyle Street. As the Society started to grow, the need for a physical base became pressing. In 1950 premises were acquired in Union Road. The first track was laid down shortly afterwards, on land in Cam Road, Chesterton.

In 1958 (during planning for an exhibition in the University Examination Hall) negotiations were started for moving to the present site in Newnham, Cambridgeshire. By the spring of 1959, the initial track had been completed and a clubhouse erected. On 20 June that year, Sir Vivian Fuchs officially opened the site. Facilities and attractions were progressively added during the following years.

After more than 20 years of use, the original elevated track required extensive repair and it was decided to replace it with a more ambitious ground level track. This multi-gauge (7¼in, 5in & 3½in – ie 184, 127 & 89mm) track, approximately oval in plan and with a station-avoiding loop, gave a continuous run of about a quarter of a mile. Steaming bays, access to which was gained via branch sections and turntables, allowed easy preparation and servicing of locomotives.

A second dual-gauge (5in and 3½in) line was constructed on raised steel piers. It ran along the southern boundary of the site to provide an out-and-back ride. This has been lifted and is currently in storage awaiting reinstatement. In 1995, a new section was opened, in the form of an elevated 32mm & 45mm gauge garden (model) railway and was rebuilt in 2014. The engines that run on these tracks may be steamed using butane gas, meths or coal. Battery-powered locomotives are also used.

A significant extension was completed in 2013 after land immediately to the north of the station area became available. The so-called 'North Loop' adds several hundred metres of track and includes a bridge and a flat crossing.

The mid-2010s saw several further developments, including a dedicated visit by the Branch Line Society (BLS) in 2015, which was reported in their annals. Also, the field to the south of the site was bought by the Cambridge University Tennis Club. A 15m wide strip adjacent to the site was added to the Society's lease, with the plan being to construct a parallel line along the southern boundary. While drawing up the planning application for this extension, a coach storage shed was added. This allowed for the ground level storage of coupled rakes of coaches.

The so-called South Loop and the new carriage shed were completed in the early 2020s. In 2022, the steaming-up area was extensively remodelled, replacing the turntable with a traverser to provide both access to the 'bays' and a loading/unloading facility of variable height. The departure platform area was changed, providing a dual purpose 'refuge' for locomotives on public running days and a second departure platform used for Club running.

== Current operations ==
The railway is located close to Cambridge R.U.F.C. There are public running days throughout the period between spring and autumn when a combination of steam engines, battery-electric engines and petrol-hydraulic engines may be used. The track is fully signalled, with two signal boxes. There is also a level crossing and a footbridge. The area within which the tracks are located covers about 5 acres, approximately half of this being quite densely wooded. Various routes can be followed by trains, but a typical journey extends over about half a mile (taking about 10 minutes).

== Gallery ==
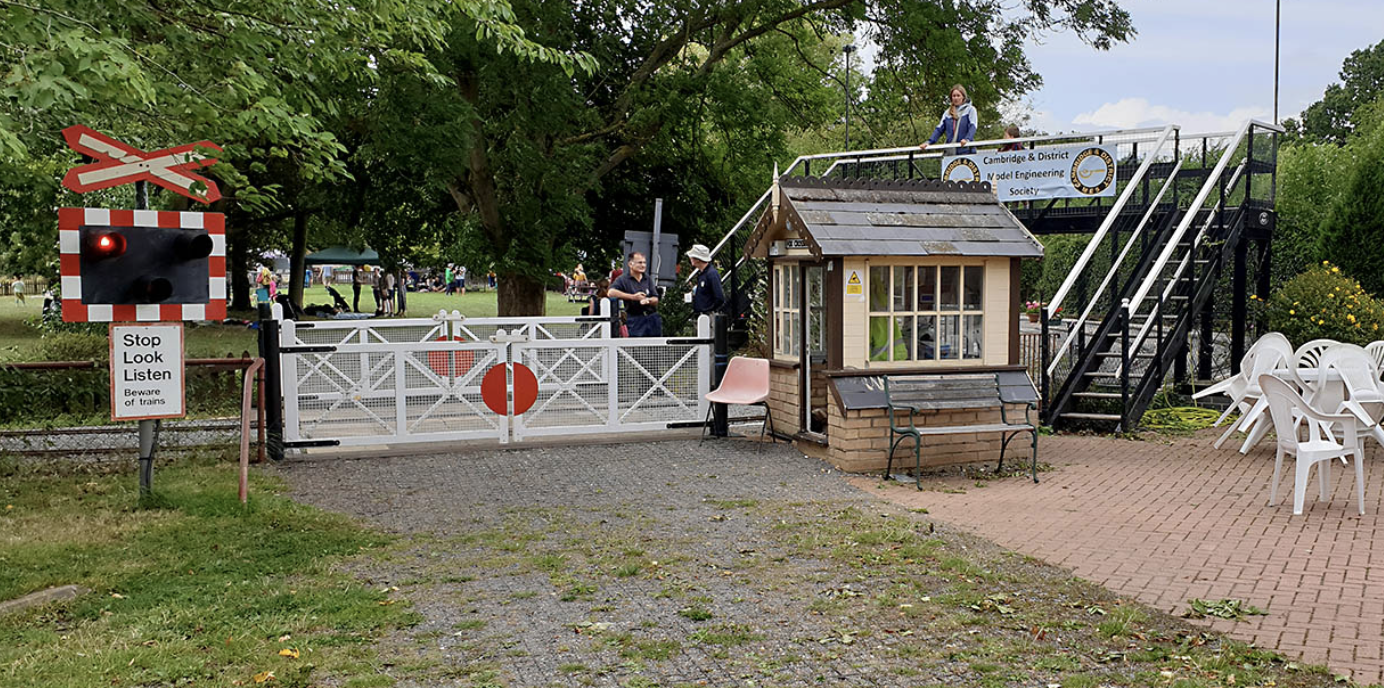
The main entrance and level crossing

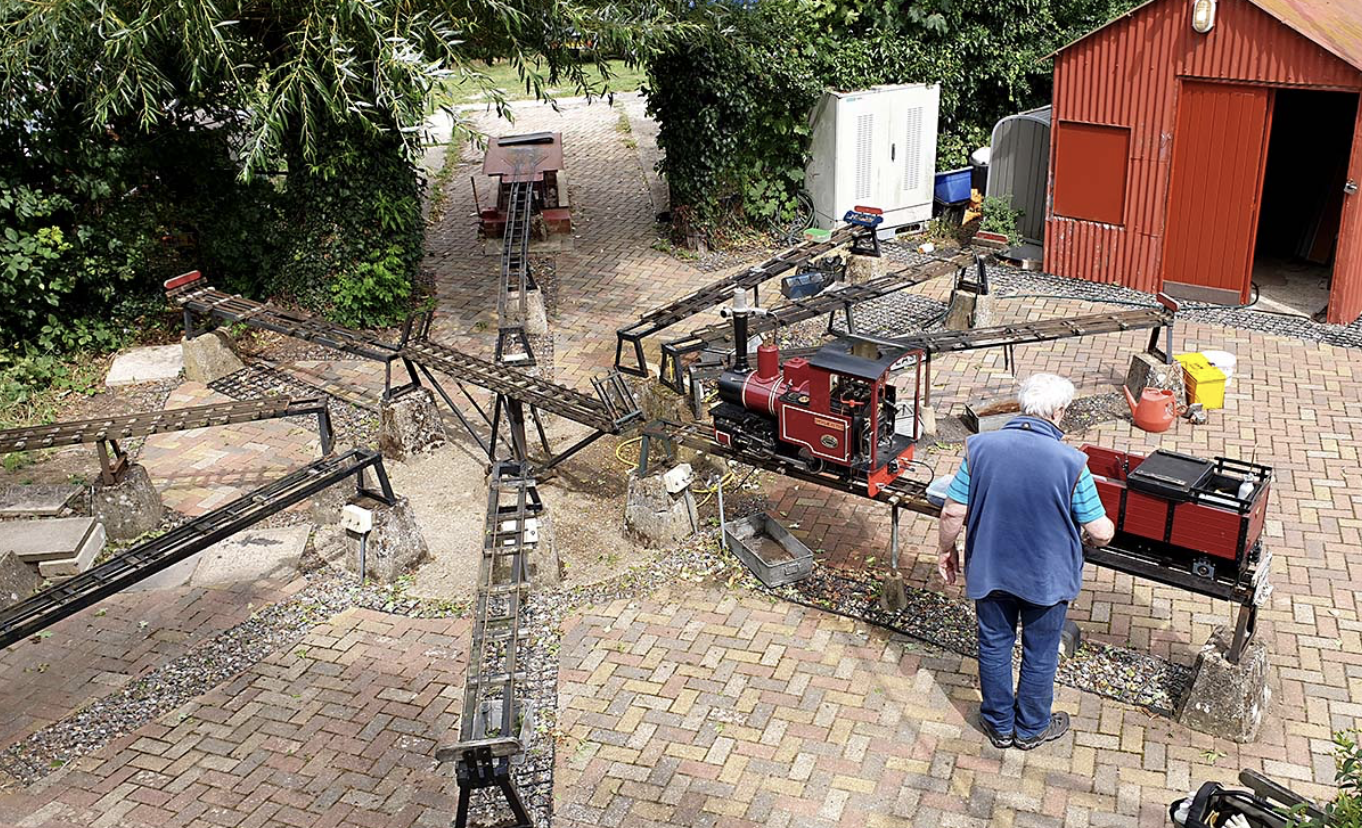
Engine servicing area

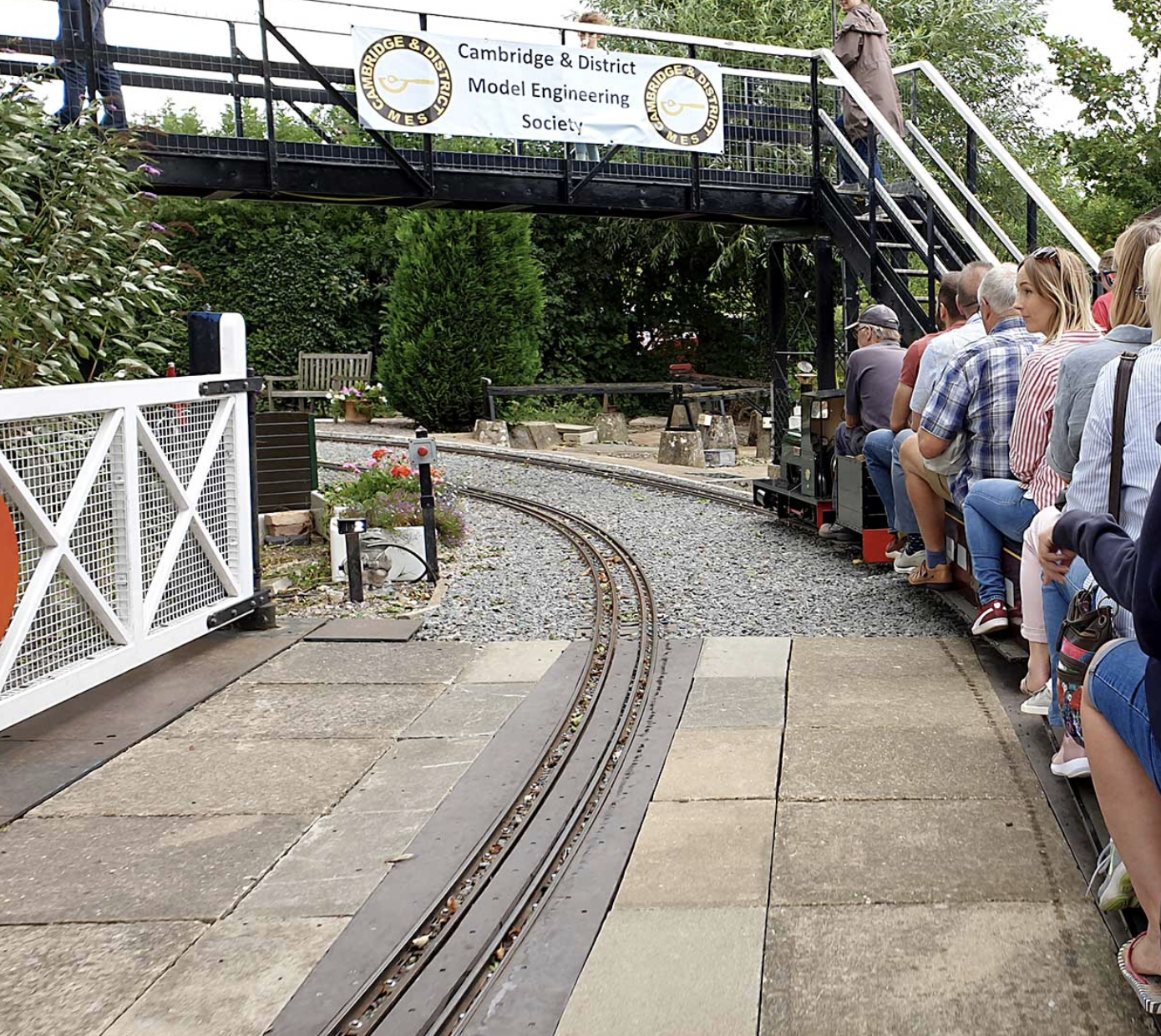
Train approaching footbridge

Video of the railway in operation
