= 2021 Cambridgeshire County Council election =

2021 UK local government election

- 6 May 2021

All 61 seats to Cambridgeshire County Council 31 seats needed for a majority
- Turnout: 39.1% (▲2.9%)
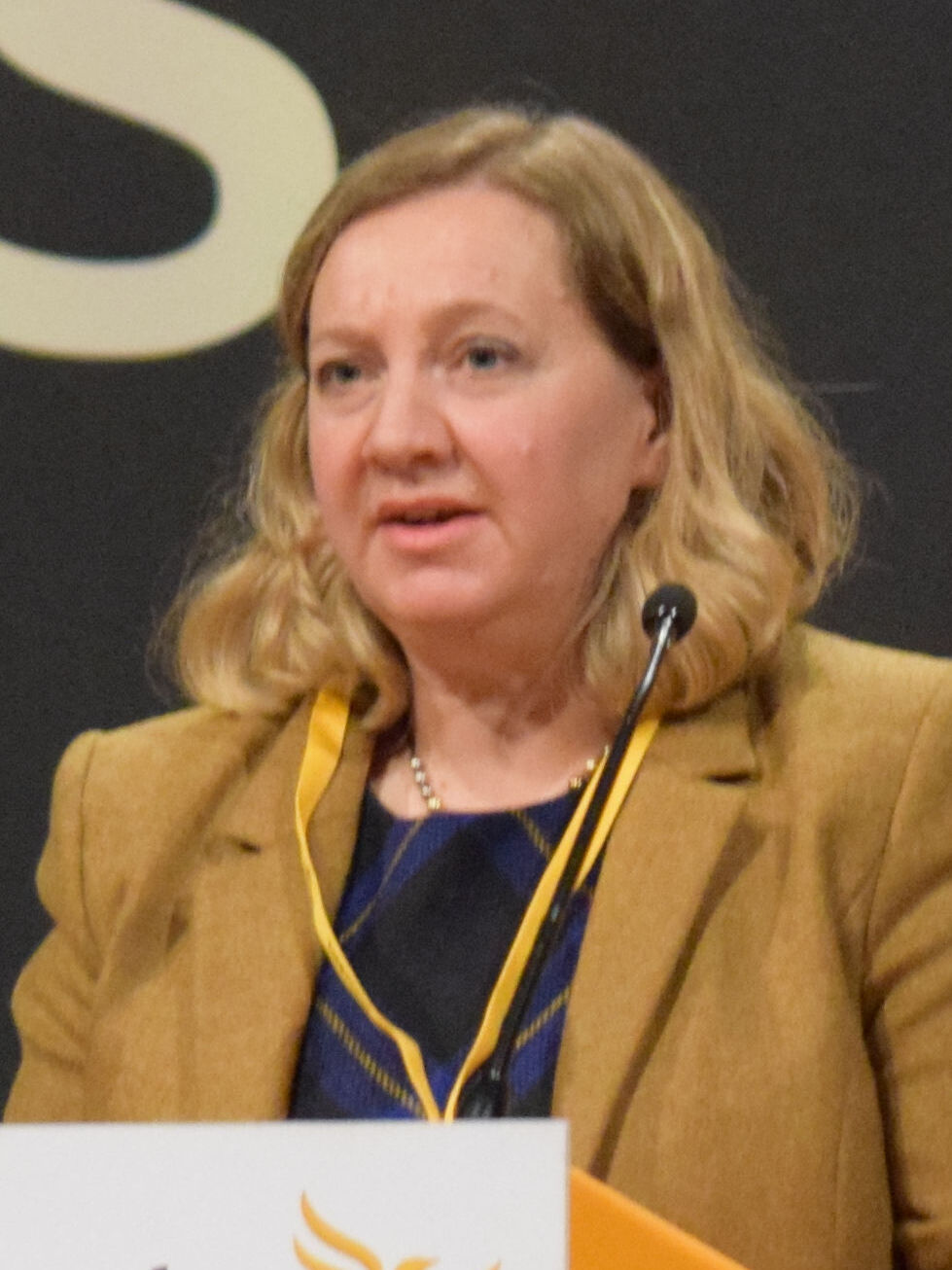

	First party	Second party	Third party
	Con		Lab
Leader	Steve Count	Lucy Nethsingha	Elisa Meschini
Party	Conservative	Liberal Democrats	Labour
Leader since	25 April 2014	May 2015	December 2019
Leader's seat	March North & Waldersey	Newnham	King's Hedges
Last election	36 seats, 40.4%	15 seats, 29.9%	7 seats, 18.0%
Seats before	34	16	6
Seats won	28	20	9
Seat change	▼8	▲5	▲2
Popular vote	75,023	53,340	36,437
Percentage	39.5%	28.1%	19.2%
Swing	▼0.9%	▼1.8%	▲1.2%
	Fourth party	Fifth party	Sixth party
Party	Independent	The St Neots Independent Group	Green
Last election	1 seats, 2.7%	2 seats, 1.8%	0 seats, 3.7%
Seats before	2	2	0
Seats won	2	2	0
Seat change	▲1	Steady	Steady
Popular vote	5,150	2,283	17,445
Percentage	2.7%	1.2%	9.3%
Swing	▲0.1%	▼0.6%	▲5.5%
- Map showing the results of the 2021 Cambridgeshire County Council election

- Council composition after the election
Council control before election
Conservative
Council control after election
No overall control

The 2021 Cambridgeshire County Council election took place on 6 May 2021 as part of the 2021 local elections in the United Kingdom. All 61 councillors were elected from 59 electoral divisions, which returned either one or two county councillors each by first-past-the-post voting for a four-year term of office. The election was held alongside a full election for Cambridge City Council, the Cambridgeshire Police and Crime Commissioner, Mayor of Cambridgeshire and Peterborough and one-third of Peterborough City Council.

== Previous composition ==
=== 2017 election ===
Party	Seats
Conservative	36
Liberal Democrats	15
Labour	7
St Neots Independents	2
Independent	1
Total	61

=== Composition of council seats before election ===
Party	Seats
Conservative	34
Liberal Democrats	16
Labour	6
St Neots Independents	2
Independent	2
Vacant (Conservative)	1
Total	61

=== Changes between elections ===
In between the 2017 election and the 2021 election, the following council seats changed hands:

Division	Date	Previous Party	New Party	Cause	Resulting Council Composition				
Division	Date	Previous Party	New Party	Cause	Con	LDem	Lab	SNI	Ind
Trumpington	May 2018	Liberal Democrats	Independent	Sitting councillor loses Whip.	36	14	7	2	2
Trumpington	2 May 2019	Independent	Liberal Democrats	Independent incumbent resigned. Liberal Democrats won by-election.	36	15	7	2	1
Duxford	27 February 2020	Conservative	Liberal Democrats	Conservative incumbent resigned. Liberal Democrats won by-election.	35	16	7	2	1
Cherry Hinton	7 December 2020	Labour	Independent	Councillor quit party to sit as an independent member.	35	16	6	2	2
Sawston and Shelford	26 February 2021	Conservative	Vacant	Sitting councillor resigned.	34	16	6	2	2

== The campaign ==
The Hickford Inquiry (that had come to be known in the press as 'Farmgate') into the tenancy of a county council owned farm by sitting Conservative councillor Roger Hickford and the delay in releasing the report was widely discussed in social media and covered in the local press election campaign coverage. Allegations of bullying and insider trading were made against the Conservative deputy-leader. Following the suspension of another Conservative councillor Simon King by his local party, over expenses submitted to Fenland District Council and the prime minister's flat refurbishment, there was a risk of allegations of sleaze dominating the campaign. Both the seats in Roger Hickford's Sawston & Shelford ward were lost to the Liberal Democrats in the election, contributing to the Conservatives' loss of control of the council.

== Results summary ==
Party	Councillors				Votes		
Party		Of total	Net			Of total	Net
Conservative Party	28	45.9%	-8	28 / 61	77,068	39.0%	-1.6%
Liberal Democrats	20	32.8%	+5	20 / 61	56,465	28.6%	-1.2%
Labour Party	9	14.8%	+2	9 / 61	37,783	19.1%	+0.8%
Green	0	0.0%	0	0 / 61	18,572	9.4%	+5.6%
Independents	2	3.3%	+1	2 / 61	5,150	2.6%	+0.3%
St. Neots Independents	2	3.3%	0	2 / 61	2,283	1.2%	-0.6%
UK Independence Party	0	0.0%	0	0 / 61	343	0.2%	-3.5%
Trade Unionist and Socialist Coalition	0	0.0%	0	0 / 61	55	0.0%	-
Workers Party of Britain	0	0.0%	0	0 / 61	48	0.0%	-

In the 2021 local government elections the Conservatives nationally had a net gain of 13 councils in England. Cambridgeshire, however, was one of the few Conservative-held councils that was lost.

Only the Conservative Party contested all 61 seats on the council. The Labour Party stood 55 candidates, not standing in six divisions in South Cambridgeshire. The Liberal Democrats stood 53 candidates, not standing in three divisions in Fenland nor in five divisions in Huntingdon District. The Green Party stood 49 candidates, including in all divisions in both Cambridge and South Cambridgeshire. The UK Independence Party stood four candidates, with their best vote share coming in Wisbech West (one of two divisions where turnout was below 25%). The Trade Unionist and Socialist Coalition stood two candidates in Huntingdonshire divisions. The St Neots Independents Group's two candidates both retained their seats, as did the Independent Tom Sanderson in Huntingdon West; Independent candidate Stephen Ferguson gained the St Neots East & Gransden seat. Including these, a total of 13 Independent candidates stood: 6 in Huntingdonshire divisions, 6 in Fenland divisions, and 1 in Fulbourn division in South Cambridgeshire. The Workers Party of Britain stood one candidate, in Wisbech East division in Fenland.

The Conservatives retained all 9 Fenland seats and gained one seat overall in Huntingdonshire, but their losses of 2 seats in East Cambs and 7 in South Cambs meant that they lost overall control.

=== Aftermath ===
On 7 May Conservative county councillor Josh Schumann told the Cambridge Independent: "It is an indication we are going to have to work with others to ensure that the council delivers a lot of what it has done over the last four years." A week later the BBC reported that the leaders of the Liberal Democrats, Labour and Independent groups had signed an agreement for control of the council.

=== Election of group leaders ===
Steve Count (March North & Waldersey) was reelected leader of the Conservative Group with Joshua Schumann (Burwell) as the deputy leader, Lucy Nethsingha (Newnham) was reelected leader of the Liberal Democrat Group with Lorna Dupré (Sutton) as the deputy, and Elisa Meschini (King's Hedges) was reelected leader of the Labour Group with Richard Howitt (Petersfield) becoming deputy leader.

=== Election of leader of the council ===
Lucy Nethsingha, the leader of the Liberal Democrat group, was duly elected leader of the council and formed a coalition administration, with Labour leader Elisa Meschini as her deputy leader.

== Results by district ==
All electoral divisions elected one councillor unless stated otherwise.

(* denotes sitting councillor)

=== Cambridge (12 seats) ===
Cambridge

District summary

Labour gained seats in Chesterton and Market divisions from the Liberal Democrats, as well regaining the Cherry Hinton seat previously held by a former Labour member who had quit the party to sit as an independent, and who did not stand for re-election.

Party	Seats	+/−	Votes	%	+/−
Labour	9	▲2	16,325	41.9	+4.8
Liberal Democrats	3	▼2	10,705	27.5	−9.7
Green	0	Steady	6,418	16.5	+8.3
Conservative	0	Steady	5,501	14.1	−0.7
UKIP	0	Steady	27	0.1	−0.6

Division results

Abbey
Party	Candidate	Votes	%	±%
Labour	Alex Bulat	1,129	41.77	▲1.17
Green	Jeremy Caddick	924	34.18	▲25.76
Conservative	Timothy Haire	326	12.06	▼1.29
Liberal Democrats	Rosy Ansell	324	11.99	▼25.63
Majority		205	7.58	▲4.60
Turnout		2,703	38.69	+0.0
Labour hold		Swing	−12.3	

Arbury
Party	Candidate	Votes	%	±%
Labour	Hilary Cox	1,359	48.16	▲3.33
Liberal Democrats	Fionna Tod	611	21.65	▼9.30
Conservative	Robert Boorman	475	16.83	▼1.43
Green	Stephen Lawrence	377	13.4	+7.4
Majority		748	26.51	+12.6
Turnout		2,822	40.87	−2.6
Labour hold		Swing	+6.3	

Castle
Party	Candidate	Votes	%	±%
Labour	Catherine Rae	1,339	40.65	▲10.87
Liberal Democrats	Alastair Gadney	1,105	33.55	▲5.34
Green	Simon Baron	537	16.30	▲10.67
Conservative	Philip Salway	313	9.50	▲1.87
Majority		234	7.03	+6.1
Turnout		3,329	49.15	+2.9
Labour hold		Swing	+2.8	

Cherry Hinton
Party	Candidate	Votes	%	±%
Labour	Bryony Goodliffe	1,617	48.59	▼0.20
Conservative	Eric Barrett-Payton	861	25.87	▲3.34
Green	Richard Potter	456	13.70	▲6.95
Liberal Democrats	Gillian Moore	394	11.84	▼10.09
Majority		756	22.72	▼3.54
Turnout		3,328	40.17	+1.2
Labour hold		Swing	−1.8	

Chesterton
Party	Candidate	Votes	%	±%
Labour	Gerri Bird	1,639	39.91	▲3.74
Liberal Democrats	Ian Manning *	1,505	36.64	▼7.45
Green	Elizabeth May	520	12.66	▲7.54
Conservative	Mike Harford	416	10.13	▼2.24
UKIP	Peter Burkinshaw	27	0.66	▼1.60
Majority		134	3.26	▼4.66
Turnout		4,107	51.32	+2.7
Labour gain from Liberal Democrats		Swing	+5.6	

King's Hedges
Party	Candidate	Votes	%	±%
Labour	Elisa Meschini *	1,478	49.25	▲9.17
Liberal Democrats	Richard Rathwell	570	18.99	▼14.95
Conservative	John Ionides	503	16.76	▲3.03
Green	Mark Slade	450	15.00	▲8.22
Majority		908	30.26	+24.1
Turnout		3,001	34.94	−1.1
Labour hold		Swing	+12.1	

Market
Party	Candidate	Votes	%	±%
Labour	Nick Gay	872	37.63	▲8.22
Liberal Democrats	Yemi Macaulay	781	33.71	▼8.16
Green	Nicola Elliott	432	18.64	▲0.20
Conservative	Phoebe Pickering	232	10.01	−0.3
Majority		91	3.93	−8.5
Turnout		2,317	34.11	+0.6
Labour gain from Liberal Democrats		Swing	▲8.19	

Newnham
Party	Candidate	Votes	%	±%
Liberal Democrats	Lucy Nethsingha *	971	41.66	▼9.51
Labour	Tariq Sadiq	777	33.33	▲5.12
Green	Shanna Hart	386	16.56	▲8.47
Conservative	James Vitali	197	8.45	−3.9
Majority		194	8.32	−14.6
Turnout		2,331	40.57	+0.3
Liberal Democrats hold		Swing	▼7.32	

Petersfield
Party	Candidate	Votes	%	±%
Labour	Richard Howitt	1,896	48.47	▲7.31
Liberal Democrats	Mark Argent	1,018	26.02	▼7.87
Green	Edwin Wilkinson	606	15.49	▲1.86
Conservative	Shapour Meftah	392	10.02	−1.3
Majority		878	22.4	+15.2
Turnout		3,912	46.29	+3.6
Labour hold		Swing	▲7.59	

Queen Ediths
Party	Candidate	Votes	%	±%
Liberal Democrats	Alex Beckett	1,355	35.95	▼10.43
Labour	Steve King	1,168	30.99	▲4.40
Conservative	Donald Douglas	647	17.17	▼3.61
Green	Jacqueline Whitmore	599	15.89	▲9.65
Majority		187	4.96	−14.8
Turnout		3,769	48.91	+0.1
Liberal Democrats hold		Swing	−7.4	

Romsey
Party	Candidate	Votes	%	±%
Labour	Neil Shailer	2,056	53.17	▲8.50
Green	Elisabeth Whitebread	722	18.67	▲9.67
Liberal Democrats	Sam Oliver	601	15.54	▼21.63
Conservative	Daniel Collis	488	12.62	+3.5
Majority		1,334	34.5	+27.0
Turnout		3,867	42.94	−0.6
Labour hold		Swing	▼0.58	

Trumpington
Party	Candidate	Votes	%	±%
Liberal Democrats	Philippa Slatter	1,470	41.70	▲2.69
Labour	Pam Stacey	995	28.23	▼1.38
Conservative	Steven George	651	18.47	▼5.79
Green	Ceri Galloway	409	11.60	+4.5
Majority		475	13.48	+4.1
Turnout		3,525	41.38	−3.0
Liberal Democrats hold		Swing	▲2.04	

=== East Cambridgeshire (8 seats) ===
East Cambridgeshire

District summary

The Liberal Democrats gained both Ely seats from the Conservatives, and held on to their Sutton seat. Elsewhere, East Cambs remained blue.

Party	Seats	+/−	Votes	%	+/−
Conservative	5	▼2	10,480	44.2	−10.0
Liberal Democrats	3	▲2	8,113	34.2	+3.4
Labour	0	Steady	3,614	15.2	+2.6
Green	0	Steady	1,514	6.4	+4.0

Division results

Burwell
Party	Candidate	Votes	%	±%
Conservative	Josh Schumann *	1,551	51.60	▼2.29
Liberal Democrats	Charlotte Cane	761	25.32	▲3.10
Labour	Liz Swift	694	23.09	▲9.90
Majority		789	26.25	
Turnout		3,006	33.84	
Conservative hold		Swing	▼2.70	

Ely North
Party	Candidate	Votes	%	±%
Liberal Democrats	Alison Whelan	1,233	42.14	▲6.77
Conservative	Richard Hobbs	1,080	36.91	▼12.41
Labour	Louise Moschetta	373	12.75	▼2.56
Green	Richard Ingram	240	8.20	N/A
Majority		151	5.23	
Turnout		2,926	41.58	
Liberal Democrats gain from Conservative		Swing	▲9.59	

Ely South
Party	Candidate	Votes	%	±%
Liberal Democrats	Piers Coutts	1,763	45.64	▲6.90
Conservative	John McFall	1,122	29.04	▼17.04
Labour	Rebecca Denness	618	16.00	▲0.82
Green	Gemma Bristow	360	9.32	N/A
Majority		641	16.59	
Turnout		3,863	46.76	
Liberal Democrats gain from Conservative		Swing	▲11.97	

Littleport
Party	Candidate	Votes	%	±%
Conservative	David Ambrose Smith *	904	53.71	▼3.52
Labour	Adam Cooley	363	21.57	▼0.64
Liberal Democrats	Paul Speed	251	14.91	▼5.65
Green	Lee Phillips	165	9.80	N/A
Majority		541	32.14	
Turnout		1,683	23.39	
Conservative hold		Swing	▼1.44	

Soham North & Isleham
Party	Candidate	Votes	%	±%
Conservative	Mark Goldsack	1,570	62.93	▼3.30
Liberal Democrats	Charles Warner	400	16.03	▼1.41
Labour	Mark Hucker	367	14.71	▼1.63
Green	Katy Prentice	158	6.33	N/A
Majority		1,170	46.89	
Turnout		2,532	29.61	
Conservative hold		Swing	▼0.94	

Soham South and Haddenham
Party	Candidate	Votes	%	±%
Conservative	Dan Schumann	1,620	51.44	▼6.28
Liberal Democrats	Helen Barker	740	23.50	▼2.58
Labour	Lydia Hill	553	17.56	▲7.46
Green	Floramay Waterhouse	236	7.49	+1.4
Majority		880		
Turnout		3,149	35.39	
Conservative hold		Swing		

Sutton
Party	Candidate	Votes	%	±%
Liberal Democrats	Lorna Helen Dupre *	2,155	65.26	▲19.50
Conservative	Jonathan Rodney Farmer	972	29.44	▼13.53
Labour	Carlos Toranzos	175	5.30	−6.0
Majority		1,183		
Turnout		3,302	37.81	
Liberal Democrats hold		Swing	▲16.52	

Woodditton
Party	Candidate	Votes	%	±%
Conservative	Alan Gordon Sharp	1,661	50.39	▼17.05
Liberal Democrats	Charles Edward Powell	809	24.54	▼6.33
Labour	Steven John O'Dell	471	14.29	▲12.60
Green	Elaine Marshall	355	10.77	N/A
Majority		852		
Turnout		3,296	38.17	
Conservative hold		Swing	▼5.36	

=== Fenland (9 seats) ===
Fenland

District summary

It was a clean sweep for the Conservative Party in Fenland. Despite some very low turnouts and swings against some candidates, they held every seat. Among those returning was Conservative group leader Steve Count.

Party	Seats	+/−	Votes	%	+/−
Conservative	9	Steady	17,030	63.0	+8.3
Labour	0	Steady	4,411	16.3	+2.7
Independent	0	Steady	2,077	7.7	+1.2
Liberal Democrats	0	Steady	1,946	7.3	-2.2
Green	0	Steady	1,299	4.8	+1.8
UKIP	0	Steady	97	0.4	−11.8
Workers Party	0	Steady	48	0.2	+0.2

Division results

Chatteris
Party	Candidate	Votes	%	±%
Conservative	Anne Hay*	1,410	59.12	▲10.66
Labour	Marian Phillips	413	17.32	▲9.38
Independent	Daniel Divine	405	16.98	+9.4
Green	Andrew Crawford	157	6.6	N/A
Majority		997		
Turnout		2,385	28.69	−1.4
Conservative hold		Swing	▲0.64	

March North & Waldersey (2 Seats)
Party	Candidate	Votes	%	±%
Conservative	Jan French*	2,978	57.7	+8.3
Conservative	Steve Count*	2,906	56.3	+2.9
Labour	Martin Field	1,053	20.4	+0.3
Labour	Mark Taylor	667	12.9	−7.3
Liberal Democrats	Sarah Bligh	640	12.4	−1.9
Green	Jazmin Stewart	446	8.6	+2.7
Green	Robert White	384	7.4	+2.9
Independent	David Patrick	381	7.4	N/A
Majority		1,853		
Turnout		5,188	28.36	
Conservative hold		Swing		
Conservative hold		Swing		

March South & Rural
Party	Candidate	Votes	%	±%
Conservative	John Gowing*	1,819	68.51	▲28.76
Labour	Amanda Hirson	480	18.08	▲10.94
Liberal Democrats	Liam O'Rourke	192	7.23	▲2.06
Green	Emma Pollard	164	6.18	▲2.00
Majority		1,339	50.43	
Turnout		2,655	31.83	
Conservative hold		Swing	▲8.91	

Roman Bank & Peckover
Party	Candidate	Votes	%	±%
Conservative	Simon King*	1,728	57.56	▲3.39
Liberal Democrats	Gavin Booth	895	29.81	▲6.91
Labour	Chris Mountain	242	8.06	▼1.32
Green	Ruth Johnson	137	4.56	N/A
Majority		833		
Turnout		3,002	33.04	▲4.03
Conservative hold		Swing	▼1.76	

Whittlesey North
Party	Candidate	Votes	%	±%
Conservative	Chris Boden*	2,055	75.39	▲9.70
Labour	Peter Bibb	571	20.95	▲7.52
Liberal Democrats	Diane Cutler	100	3.67	▼0.81
Majority		1,484		
Turnout		2,726	33.68	▲6.66
Conservative hold		Swing	▲1.09	

Whittlesey South
Party	Candidate	Votes	%	±%
Conservative	David Connor*	1,727	61.09	▼5.34
Labour	Jes Hibbert	497	17.58	▲7.88
Independent	Bob Wicks	455	16.1	N/A
Green	Simon Wilkes	148	5.2	▼0.65
Majority		1,232		
Turnout		2,827	32.74	▲2.94
Conservative hold		Swing	▼6.61	

Wisbech East
Party	Candidate	Votes	%	±%
Conservative	Samantha Hoy*	1,358	62.6	−0.6
Independent	Spike Crowson	358	16.5	N/A
Labour	Reginald Martin Mee	286	13.2	−1.9
Liberal Democrats	Rasa McGill	119	5.5	+2.34
Workers Party	Clayton Maxwell Payne	48	2.21	N/A
Majority		1,000		
Turnout		2,169	27.96	▲2.16
Conservative hold		Swing	▼5.22	

Wisbech West
Party	Candidate	Votes	%	±%
Conservative	Steve Tierney*	1,049	57.5	−3.6
Independent	Andy Maul	451	24.7	N/A
Labour	Daniel James Kerry	202	11.1	+0.3
UKIP	Ted Hurlock	97	5.3	−6.7
Independent	Lynn Monk	27	1.5	N/A
Majority		598		
Turnout		1,826	24.18	▼2.62
Conservative hold		Swing	▼10.44	

=== Huntingdonshire (17 seats) ===
Huntingdonshire

District summary

The Conservative Party gained a couple of seats in Huntingdonshire from the Liberal Democrats, strengthening their hold on the area, losing by just 11 votes in St Neots East and Gransden to Stephen Ferguson (Independent).

Party	Seats	+/−	Votes	%	+/−
Conservative	12	▲1	23,249	49.8	+1.0
Independent	2	▲1	2,888	6.2	+2.9
St Neots Independents	2	Steady	2,283	4.9	−2.4
Liberal Democrats	1	▼2	7,711	16.5	−4.8
Labour	0	Steady	7,566	16.2	+3.9
Green	0	Steady	2,762	5.9	+5.9
UKIP	0	Steady	219	0.5	−6.5
TUSC	0	Steady	55	0.1	+0.1

Division results

Alconbury & Kimbolton
Party	Candidate	Votes	%	±%
Conservative	Ian Derek Gardener *	2,362	68.0	+6.2
Liberal Democrats	Alastair Angus Henderson-Begg	488	14.0	−16.9
Green	John McCutcheon	319	9.2	N/A
Labour	Philip Nigel Sly	306	8.8	+1.5
Majority		1,874		
Turnout		3,475	43.21	
Conservative hold		Swing		

Brampton & Buckden
Party	Candidate	Votes	%	±%
Conservative	Ken Billington	1,494	43.4	−1.6
Liberal Democrats	John Richard Childs	1,326	38.5	−10.1
Labour	Sam Wakeford	419	12.2	+5.7
Green	Gareth John Holsgrove	206	6.0	N/A
Majority		168		
Turnout		3,445	38.94	
Conservative gain from Liberal Democrats		Swing		

Godmanchester & Huntingdon South
Party	Candidate	Votes	%	±%
Liberal Democrats	Graham Martin Wilson*	1,258	46.0	−6.3
Conservative	Paula Jane Sparling	972	35.6	+6.9
Labour	Samuel Paul Week	465	17.0	+4.7
TUSC	Will Martin	38	1.4	N/A
Majority		286		
Turnout		2,733	36.89	
Liberal Democrats hold		Swing		

Huntingdon North & Hartford
Party	Candidate	Votes	%	±%
Conservative	Jonas King	1,039	39.0	+5.6
Labour	Patrick Kadewere	847	31.8	+10.7
Liberal Democrats	Phil Pearce	670	25.1	−9.9
UKIP	Peter Henry Ashcroft	93	3.5	−7.0
TUSC	Geoff Eagle	17	0.6	N/A
Majority		192		
Turnout		2,666	31.88	
Conservative gain from Liberal Democrats		Swing		

Huntingdon West
Party	Candidate	Votes	%	±%
Independent	Tom Sanderson *	1,427	55.2	+7.2
Labour	Leedo George	636	24.9	+13.1
Conservative	Gus Thomas Rankin	494	19.3	−6.1
Majority		791		
Turnout		2,588	34.73	
Independent hold		Swing		

Ramsey & Bury
Party	Candidate	Votes	%	±%
Conservative	Adela Eva Costello *	1,698	64.6	+19.5
Independent	Mike Tew	518	19.7	N/A
Labour	Mark Trevor Hebert	412	15.7	+6.6
Majority		1,180		
Turnout		2,655	32.55	
Conservative hold		Swing		

St Ives North & Wyton
Party	Candidate	Votes	%	±%
Conservative	Ryan Fuller *	1,241	51.0	−3.2
Labour	Angela Louise Richards	471	19.3	+2.0
Green	Ann Barnes	337	13.8	N/A
Liberal Democrats	James Roger Catmur	207	8.5	−9.4
Independent	Paul Bullen	179	7.4	N/A
Majority		770		
Turnout		2,435	30.64	
Conservative hold		Swing		

St Ives South & Needingworth
Party	Candidate	Votes	%	±%
Conservative	Kevin Reynolds *	1,368	45.8	−13.5
Liberal Democrats	Nic Wells	749	25.1	+5.7
Labour	Cath Gleadow	565	18.9	−2.4
Green	John Robert George Parkin	305	10.2	N/A
Majority		619		
Turnout		2,987	37.99	
Conservative hold		Swing		

St Neots East & Gransden
Party	Candidate	Votes	%	±%
Independent	Stephen William Ferguson	764	38.8	N/A
Conservative	Sam Collins	755	38.3	−14.3
Green	Lara Davenport-Ray	240	12.2	N/A
Labour	Ryan David Lee	211	10.7	−0.7
Majority		9	0.45	
Turnout		1,995	39.3	+5.7
Independent gain from Conservative		Swing		

St Neots Eynesbury
Party	Candidate	Votes	%	±%
The St Neots Independent Group	Simone Leigh Taylor *	879	39.2	−4.2
Conservative	Nigel Philip Eaton	834	37.3	+2.8
Labour	Amy Louise Duckworth	364	16.2	+6.2
Green	Liz Timms	163	7.3	N/A
Majority		45		
Turnout		2,241	28.58	
St Neots Independents hold		Swing		

St Neots Priory Park & Little Paxton
Party	Candidate	Votes	%	±%
Conservative	Keith Ivan Prentice	1,237	46.6	+3.7
Liberal Democrats	Geoffrey Michael Seeff	662	25.0	+0.9
Labour	Janet Elizabeth Boston	402	15.2	+4.9
Green	Daniel Edward Laycock	352	13.3	N/A
Majority		575		
Turnout		2,653	34.01	

St Neots The Eatons
Party	Candidate	Votes	%	±%
The St Neots Independent Group	Derek Arthur Giles *	1,404	42.0	−4.3
Conservative	Andy Jennings	1,217	36.4	+9.0
Labour	Celia Ann Emery	432	12.9	+6.3
Green	Catherine James Goodman	287	8.6	−4.2
Majority		187		
Turnout		3,340	34.91	
St Neots Independents hold		Swing		

Sawtry & Stilton
Party	Candidate	Votes	%	±%
Conservative	Simon Bywater *	2,399	72.0	+3.2
Labour	Joshua Benjamin Sandeman	514	15.4	+1.7
Liberal Democrats	John Paul Morris	293	8.8	+0.5
UKIP	Roger John Henson	126	3.8	N/A
Majority		1,885		
Turnout		3,332	35.66	
Conservative hold		Swing		

Somersham & Earith
Party	Candidate	Votes	%	±%
Conservative	Steve Criswell *	1,713	62.3	−5.9
Liberal Democrats	Tony Hulme	399	14.5	+0.1
Labour	Karen Andrée Webb	362	13.2	+2.2
Green	Kirsten Kathleen McLaughlin	278	10.1	N/A
Majority		1,314		
Turnout		2,802	36.3	
Conservative hold		Swing	-3.01	

The Hemingfords & Fenstanton
Party	Candidate	Votes	%	±%
Conservative	Douglas Bernard Dew	1,737	56.3	−5.9
Liberal Democrats	David John Priestman	698	22.6	−5.0
Labour	Michael John Gleadow	377	12.2	+2.0
Green	Seona Gunn-Kelly	275	8.9	N/A
Majority		1,039		
Turnout		3,140	40.1	

Warboys & The Stukeleys
Party	Candidate	Votes	%	±%
Conservative	Steve Corney	1,393	64.6	+2.2
Liberal Democrats	Helen Kewley	383	17.8	+4.2
Labour	Paul Joseph Williams	380	17.6	−9.1
Majority		1,010		
Turnout		2,156	32.06	
Conservative hold		Swing	-1.02	

Yaxley & Farcet
Party	Candidate	Votes	%	±%
Conservative	Mac McGuire *	1,296	56.9	
Liberal Democrats	Andrew Richard Wood	578	25.4	N/A
Labour	Sarah Margaret Vivian Smalley	403	17.7	
Majority		718		
Turnout		2,277	27.21	
Conservative hold		Swing	-10.43	

=== South Cambridgeshire (15 seats) ===
South Cambridgeshire

District summary

The Liberal Democrats in South Cambridgeshire gained six new seats from Conservatives across five divisions, and retained a seat that had been won in a 2020 by-election. The closest battle was in Hardwick, where Michael Atkins (Lib Dems) beat incumbent Lina Nieto (Con) by just five votes.

Party	Seats	+/−	Votes	%	+/−
Liberal Democrats	13	▲7	27,990	45.7	+5.7
Conservative	2	▼7	20,808	34.0	−6.2
Green	0	Steady	6,442	10.5	+6.6
Labour	0	Steady	5,867	9.6	−4.3
Independent	0	Steady	185	0.3	−1.1

Division results

Bar Hill
Party	Candidate	Votes	%	±%
Liberal Democrats	Edna Murphy	1,500	44.92	▲17.03
Conservative	Lynda Harford *	1,345	40.28	▲0.19
Green	Stan Rankin	494	14.79	▲6.38
Majority		155	4.64	
Turnout		3339	47.69	
Liberal Democrats gain from Conservative		Swing	8.42	

Cambourne
Party	Candidate	Votes	%	±%
Conservative	Mark Howell *	1,155	38.25	−5.1
Liberal Democrats	Stephen Drew	969	32.1	+4.2
Labour	Timothy Hayes	595	19.7	−2.6
Green	Marcus Pitcaithly	301	10.0	+2.8
Majority		186		
Turnout		3,020	34.28	?
Conservative hold		Swing	-4.93	

Cottenham & Willingham
Party	Candidate	Votes	%	±%
Liberal Democrats	Neil Gough	2,045	53.2	+17.9
Conservative	Timothy Wotherspoon *	1,363	35.5	+0.2
Green	Colin Coe	435	11.3	+6.2
Majority		682		
Turnout		3,843	45.4	
Liberal Democrats gain from Conservative		Swing	▲8.9	

Peter McDonald had gained the Duxford seat from Conservatives in a by-election in February 2020. The by-election, in which only two candidates stood, had resulted from incumbent and Conservative District Council leader Peter Topping standing down to relocate.

Duxford
Party	Candidate	Votes	%	±%
Liberal Democrats	Peter John McDonald *	1,990	48.3	+15.0
Conservative	Luigi Robert Murton	1,692	41.1	−14.0
Green	Claire Ann James	438	10.6	+6.6
Majority		298		
Turnout		4,120	49.51	
Liberal Democrats gain from Conservative		Swing	15	

Fulbourn
Party	Candidate	Votes	%	±%
Liberal Democrats	Claire Hilda Gabriel Daunton	1,182	38.8	−4.6
Conservative	George Searle Walker	754	24.8	−7.3
Labour	Tim Andrews	666	21.9	+2.4
Green	Oliver Fisher	258	8.5	+3.5
Independent	Neil John Scarr	185	6.1	N/A
Majority		428		
Turnout		3,045	42.8	
Liberal Democrats hold		Swing		

Gamlingay
Party	Candidate	Votes	%	±%
Liberal Democrats	Sebastian Kindersley *	1,942	49.7	+7.5
Conservative	Harriet Gould	1,711	43.8	+3.2
Green	Steven Alex Bradshaw	251	6.4	N/A
Majority		231		
Turnout		3,903	47.14	
Liberal Democrats hold		Swing	2.14	

Hardwick
Party	Candidate	Votes	%	±%
Liberal Democrats	Michael Ian Atkins	1,865	43.2	+8.3
Conservative	Lina Nieto *	1,860	43.1	−3.8
Green	Colin Reynolds	590	13.7	+7.1
Majority		5		
Turnout		4,315	48.2	
Liberal Democrats gain from Conservative		Swing		

Histon & Impington
Party	Candidate	Votes	%	±%
Liberal Democrats	Ros Hathorn	2,240	57.1	+3.2
Conservative	Steven James Mastin	725	19.5	−3.7
Labour	Khadija Arsalan	630	16.1	−0.6
Green	Sandra Ann Archer	327	8.3	+2.1
Majority		1,515		
Turnout		3,922	45.95	
Liberal Democrats hold		Swing		

Linton
Party	Candidate	Votes	%	±%
Liberal Democrats	Henry Alexander Frederick Batchelor *	2,024	49.5	+1.9
Conservative	John Joseph Bald	1,506	36.8	−1.6
Labour	Philip David White	303	7.4	+0.5
Green	Paul Evans	256	6.3	−0.8
Majority		518		
Turnout		4,089	47.16	
Liberal Democrats hold		Swing	1.74	

Longstanton, Northstowe & Over
Party	Candidate	Votes	%	±%
Liberal Democrats	Firouz Thompson	1,706	53.7	+13.9
Conservative	Tom Bygott	1,126	35.5	−10.4
Green	Maria Dawn Harrison	342	10.8	+5.9
Majority		580		
Turnout		3,174	44.85	
Liberal Democrats gain from Conservative		Swing		

Melbourn & Bassingbourn
Party	Candidate	Votes	%	±%
Liberal Democrats	Susan Elizabeth Kerr van de Ven *	1,854	55.5	−0.7
Conservative	Tom Goldie	1,061	31.7	+6.0
Green	Simon Peter Saggers	249	7.4	+1.6
Labour	Christopher John Tudor Lewis	179	5.4	−0.3
Majority		793		
Turnout		3,343	41.48	
Liberal Democrats hold		Swing		

Papworth & Swavesey
Party	Candidate	Votes	%	±%
Conservative	Mandy Lorraine Smith *	1,309	45.7	−10.3
Labour	Tom Mayer	864	28.4	+17.0
Liberal Democrats	Peter David Sandford	568	18.6	−6.1
Green	Daniel Aspel	217	7.2	−0.7
Majority		445		
Turnout		3,039	40.99	
Conservative hold		Swing		

One of the two Sawston & Shelford seats was vacant as Roger Hickford had resigned, the other incumbent did not stand for re-election.

Sawston & Shelford (2 Seats)
Party	Candidate	Votes	%	±%
Liberal Democrats	Brian Milnes	3,518	46.9	+8.3
Liberal Democrats	Maria King	3,125	41.6	+1.4
Conservative	Manas Deb	2,106	28.1	−14.8
Conservative	Dale Keith Hargrove	2,045	27.2	−13.9
Green	Sophi Berridge	1,041	13.9	N/A
Labour	Tracey Lynne Draper	898	12.0	−7.0
Green	Eleanor Ruth Crane	743	9.9	N/A
Labour	Anand Pillai	679	9.0	−9.8
Majority		2,492		
Turnout		7,504	47.57	
Liberal Democrats gain from Conservative		Swing		
Liberal Democrats gain from Conservative		Swing		

Waterbeach
Party	Candidate	Votes	%	±%
Liberal Democrats	Anna Elizabeth Bradnam *	1,462	36.0	−10.4
Labour	James Phillip Bull	1,053	25.9	+9.8
Conservative	Ben Shelton	1,050	25.8	−6.4
Green	Thomas Anthony Lachlan-Cope	500	12.3	+7.0
Majority		409		
Turnout		4.065	44.99	
Liberal Democrats hold		Swing		

== Changes 2021–2025 ==
- November 2022: Derek Giles (St Neots Independents) dies - by-election held February 2023
- January 2023: Douglas Dew (Conservative) joins Liberal Democrats
- February 2023: Geoffrey Seeff (Liberal Democrats) gains by-election from St Neots Independents
- March 2023: Hilary Cox Condron (Labour) and Dan Schumann (Conservative) resign - by-elections held May 2023
- April 2023: Josh Schumann (Conservative) leaves party to sit as an independent
- May 2023: Mike Black (Labour) and Bill Hunt (Conservative) win by-elections
- January 2024: Mac McGuire (Conservative) dies - by-election held March 2024; Ryan Fuller (Conservative) leaves party to sit as an independent
- February 2024: Jonas King (Conservative) and Keith Prentice (Conservative) leave party to sit as independents
- March 2024: Andrew Wood (Liberal Democrats) gains by-election from Conservatives
- May 2024: Keith Prentice (independent) joins Labour
- February 2025: Kevin Reynolds (Conservative) leaves party to sit as an independent

=== St Neots The Eatons ===
St Neots The Eatons: 16 February 2023
Party	Candidate	Votes	%	±%
Liberal Democrats	Geoff Seeff	1,042	43.5	N/A
Conservative	Andrew Jennings	746	31.1	
Independent	Colin Maslen	360	15.0	
Labour	Taylor Purdon	250	10.4	
Majority		296	12.4	
Turnout		2,407	25.5	−9.4
Liberal Democrats gain from St Neots Independents		Swing		

The by-election was triggered by the death of St Neots Independents councillor Derek Giles.

=== Arbury ===
Arbury: 4 May 2023
Party	Candidate	Votes	%	±%
Labour	Mike Black	1,174	43.0	–5.2
Conservative	Robert Boorman	761	27.9	+11.1
Green	Stephen Lawrence	397	14.6	+1.2
Liberal Democrats	Sam Oliver	396	14.5	–7.2
Majority		413	15.1	
Turnout		2,751		
Labour hold		Swing	▼8.2	

The by-election was triggered by the resignation of Labour councillor Hilary Cox Condron, who cited her mental health.

=== Soham South and Haddenham ===
Soham South and Haddenham: 4 May 2023
Party	Candidate	Votes	%	±%
Conservative	Bill Hunt	1,568	44.6	−6.9
Liberal Democrats	Connor Docwra	1,276	36.3	+12.8
Labour	Simon Patenall	379	10.8	−6.8
Green	Pip Gardner	293	8.3	+0.8
Majority		292	8.3	−19.6
Turnout		3,567	39.3	+3.9
Conservative hold		Swing	-9.9	

The by-election was triggered by the resignation of Conservative councillor Dan Schumann.

=== Yaxley and Farcet ===
Yaxley and Farcet: 21 March 2024
Party	Candidate	Votes	%	±%
Liberal Democrats	Andrew Wood	509	31.0	+5.6
Conservative	Kev Gulson	470	28.6	−28.3
Independent	Sally Howell	448	27.3	New
Labour	Richard Ilett	175	10.6	−7.1
Green	Ellisa Westerman	42	2.6	New
Majority		39	2.4	N/A
Turnout		1,648	20.0	−7.2
Liberal Democrats gain from Conservative		Swing	+16.9	

The by-election was triggered by the death of Conservative councillor Mac McGuire.

== See also ==
- 2021 Cambridgeshire and Peterborough mayoral election
- 2021 Cambridgeshire police and crime commissioner election
