= Lucy Nethsingha =

British politician (born 1973)

Cllr Lucy Nethsingha
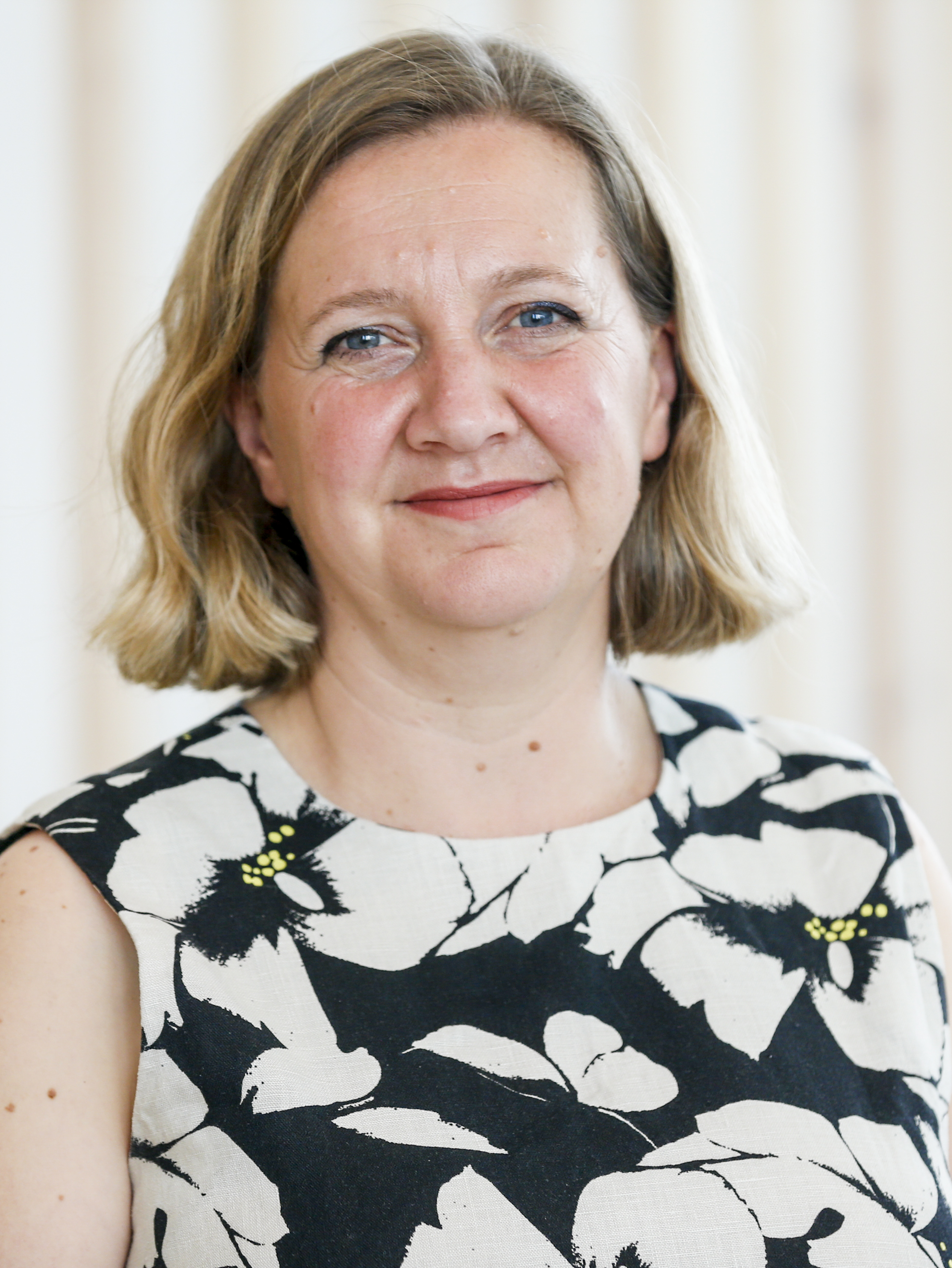
- Nethsingha in 2019

Leader of Cambridgeshire County Council
- Incumbent
- Assumed office 18 May 2021
- Deputy: Lorna Dupré
- Preceded by: Steve Count

Lib Dem Group Leader on Cambridgeshire County Council
- Incumbent
- Assumed office May 2015
- Deputy: Maurice Leeke; David Jenkins; Lorna Dupré
- Preceded by: Maurice Leeke

Member of the European Parliament for East of England
- In office 2 July 2019 – 31 January 2020
- Preceded by: David Campbell Bannerman
- Succeeded by: Constituency abolished

Cambridgeshire County Councillor for Newnham (2009-2025), Cambourne (2025-
- Incumbent
- Assumed office 4 June 2009
- Preceded by: Alexander Reid
- Majority: 548 (23.0%)

Personal details
- Born: Lucy Kathleen Sellwood; 6 February 1973 (age 53) Southampton, England
- Party: Liberal Democrats
- Spouse: Andrew Nethsingha

Lucy Kathleen Nethsingha (née Sellwood; born 6 February 1973) is a British Liberal Democrat politician who has served as Leader of Cambridgeshire County Council since 2021, and leader of the Liberal Democrat group on the council since 2015. She was a Member of the European Parliament (MEP) for the East of England from 2019 until 2020.

== Early life ==
Born in Southampton in 1973, she attended the comprehensive Penair School, in Truro, to the age of 16. She attended the sixth form of the independent Truro School, then gained a BSc degree in Psychology from the University of Southampton.

== Politics ==
Nethsingha served as a Liberal Democrat councillor on Gloucester City Council from 2004 to 2008. After moving to Cambridgeshire, Nethsingha was elected for the Newnham division on Cambridgeshire County Council as a Liberal Democrat at the 2009 election, and has been leader of the Liberal Democrat Group on the council since 2015 (she had previously been deputy leader since 2011). At the 2025 Cambridgeshire County Council election she was elected for the Cambourne division and the Liberal Democrats took majority control of the county council. From 2016 to 2024, she also represented the Newnham ward on Cambridge City Council.

She unsuccessfully contested the North East Cambridgeshire parliamentary constituency in the 2015 general election, finishing in fourth place out of five candidates with 2,314 votes (4.5%). In the snap general election held two years later, she contested South East Cambridgeshire and finished last out of three candidates with 11,958 votes (19.0%).

Nethsingha became a Member of the European Parliament in the 2019 elections, until 2020 when the United Kingdom left the EU.

After the 2021 Cambridgeshire County Council election she became leader of the council after agreeing a deal with the Labour and Independent groups.

== Personal life ==
Nethsingha grew up in Cornwall, which she states made her aware of the importance of caring for the environment. She is a teacher by profession and holds a master's degree from the University of Cambridge.

In 1996 she married Andrew Nethsingha, who has been organist and master of the choristers at Westminster Abbey since 2023. They have three children.
