= Wendy Nicol, Baroness Nicol =

British Labour Co-operative politician

The Right Honourable The Baroness Nicol

Member of the House of Lords
- Lord Temporal
- Life peerage 20 January 1983 – 15 January 2018

Personal details
- Born: Olive Mary Wendy Rowe-Hunter; 21 March 1923
- Died: 15 January 2018 (aged 94)
- Party: Labour Co-operative

Olive Mary Wendy Nicol, Baroness Nicol (née Rowe-Hunter; 21 March 1923 – 15 January 2018) was a British Labour Co-operative politician.

== Career ==
The daughter of James and Harriet Rowe-Hunter, she was educated at Cahir School, Ireland. From 1942 to 1944, Nicol was a clerical officer of the Inland Revenue and Inspector of the Admiralty from 1944 to 1948. She was a member of the Co-operative Wholesale Society's Board from 1976 to 1985, as president from 1981.

She served as a councillor on Cambridge City Council from 1978 to 1982, and was created a life peer with the title Baroness Nicol, of Newnham in the County of Cambridge on 20 January 1983. In the House of Lords, she was Opposition Whip and Baroness in Waiting from 1983 to 1989 and Deputy Speaker from 1995 to 2002.

Baroness Nicol was member of the Lord Chancellor's Advisory Committee from 1982 to 1988 and of the Parliamentary Office of Science and Technology (POST) from 1998 to 2000.

== Personal life ==
She was married to Alexander Douglas Ian Nicol from 1947 until his death in 2009; they had two sons and one daughter. Wendy died on 15 January 2018 from natural causes; she was 94 years old.
