= 2024 Cambridge City Council election =

2024 English local election

- 2 May 2024

14 out of 42 seats to Cambridge City Council 22 seats needed for a majority

	First party	Second party	Third party
Leader	Mike Davey	Tim Bick	Naomi Bennett
Party	Labour	Liberal Democrats	Green
Last election	27 seats, 38.2%	10 seats, 22.1%	4 seats, 17.9%
Seats before	25	11	4
Seats won	9	3	2
Seats after	25	10	5
Seat change	Steady	▼1	▲1
Popular vote	13,622	7,292	6,884
Percentage	41.1%	22.0%	20.8%
Swing	▲2.9%	▼0.1%	▲2.9%
	Fourth party	Fifth party
Party	Conservative	Independent
Last election	0 seats, 19.2%	1 seat, 2.3%
Seats before	1	1
Seats won	0	0
Seats after	1	1
Seat change	Steady	Steady
Popular vote	4,561	680
Percentage	13.8%	2.1%
Swing	▼5.4%	▼0.1%
- Winner of each seat at the 2024 Cambridge City Council election
Council control before election
Mike Davey
Labour
Council control after election
Mike Davey
Labour

The 2024 Cambridge City Council election took place on 2 May 2024 to elect members of Cambridge City Council in Cambridgeshire, England. This was on the same day as other local elections.

== Summary ==
Prior to the election the council was under Labour majority control. Only one seat changed hands at this election, being a Green gain from the Liberal Democrats, and so Labour retained overall control.

=== Election result ===
2024 Cambridge City Council election
Party	This election			Full council			This election		
Party	Seats	Net	Seats %	Other	Total	Total %	Votes	Votes %	+/−
Labour	9	Steady	64.3	16	25	59.5	13,622	41.1	+2.9
Liberal Democrats	3	▼1	21.4	7	10	23.8	7,292	22.0	–0.1
Green	2	▲1	14.3	3	5	11.9	6,884	20.8	+2.9
Conservative	0	Steady	0.0	1	1	2.4	4,561	13.8	–5.4
Independent	0	Steady	0.0	1	1	2.4	680	2.1	–0.2
Freedom Alliance	0	Steady	0.0	0	0	0.0	44	0.1	N/A
Communist	0	Steady	0.0	0	0	0.0	42	0.1	N/A

== Ward results ==
The Statement of Persons Nominated, which details the candidates standing in each ward, was released by Cambridge City Council following the close of nominations on 5 April 2024. The results for each ward were as follows:

=== Abbey ===
Abbey
Party	Candidate	Votes	%	±%
Green	Naomi Bennett*	1,189	52.1	+9.4
Labour	Ben Cartwright	650	28.5	–3.4
Conservative	David Smith	226	9.9	–8.5
Liberal Democrats	Rosemary Ansell	173	7.6	+0.7
Communist	Simon Brignell	42	1.8	N/A
Majority		539	19.1	
Turnout		2,819		
Green hold		Swing	▲6.4	

=== Arbury ===
Arbury
Party	Candidate	Votes	%	±%
Labour	Patrick Sheil*	1,093	51.5	+3.4
Conservative	Robert Boorman	365	17.2	–10.3
Green	Stephen Lawrence	348	16.4	+2.8
Liberal Democrats	John Leighton	316	14.9	+4.1
Majority		728	25.5	
Turnout		2,850		
Labour hold		Swing	▲6.9	

=== Castle ===
Castle
Party	Candidate	Votes	%	±%
Labour	Antoinette Nestor*	771	40.0	+13.1
Independent	David Summerfield	407	21.1	–2.6
Liberal Democrats	Caroline Stoddart	369	19.1	–11.5
Green	Esme Hennessy	294	15.2	+2.5
Conservative	Szymon Sawicki	88	4.6	–1.5
Majority		364	15.9	
Turnout		2,293		
Labour hold		Swing	▲7.9	

=== Cherry Hinton ===
Cherry Hinton
Party	Candidate	Votes	%	±%
Labour	Mark Ashton*	1,149	48.5	+5.5
Conservative	Mo Pantall	635	26.8	–13.8
Liberal Democrats	Aiden Roe	356	15.0	+7.6
Green	Joshua Morris-Blake	228	9.6	+0.6
Majority		514	17.8	
Turnout		2,882		
Labour hold		Swing	▲9.7	

=== Coleridge ===
Coleridge
Party	Candidate	Votes	%	±%
Labour	Tim Griffin*	1,124	43.5	+2.3
Green	Sarah Nicmanis	881	34.1	+9.0
Conservative	Shapour Meftah	419	16.2	–7.6
Liberal Democrats	Judy Brunton	158	6.1	–3.7
Majority		243	8.6	
Turnout		2,825		
Labour hold		Swing	▼3.4	

=== East Chesterton ===
East Chesterton
Party	Candidate	Votes	%	±%
Labour	Gerri Bird*	1,006	42.1	+3.7
Liberal Democrats	Bob Illingworth	765	32.0	–1.6
Green	Elizabeth May	368	15.4	+3.8
Conservative	Francisco Ribeiro	251	10.5	–2.4
Majority		241	9.2	
Turnout		2,631		
Labour hold		Swing	▲2.7	

=== King's Hedges ===
King's Hedges
Party	Candidate	Votes	%	±%
Labour	Jenny Gawthrope Wood*	974	45.1	+5.9
Conservative	Sm Nazrul Islam	737	34.1	+2.2
Green	Robin Brabham	231	10.7	–3.3
Liberal Democrats	Fionna Tod	217	10.1	–4.9
Majority		237	9.9	
Turnout		2,396		
Labour hold		Swing	▲1.9	

=== Market ===
Market
Party	Candidate	Votes	%	±%
Liberal Democrats	Tim Bick*	777	40.9	–0.3
Labour	Rosy Greenlees	666	35.1	+0.4
Green	Krzysztof Strug	310	16.3	+1.7
Conservative	John Marenbon	146	7.7	–1.8
Majority		111	5.5	
Turnout		2,010		
Liberal Democrats hold		Swing	▼0.4	

=== Newnham ===
Newnham
Party	Candidate	Votes	%	±%
Green	Hugh Clough	925	45.8	+5.3
Labour	Yvonne Nobis	549	27.2	–7.0
Liberal Democrats	Lucy Nethsingha*	306	15.2	–2.8
Independent	David Carmona	155	7.7	N/A
Conservative	Susan Williams	84	4.2	–3.1
Majority		376	15.7	
Turnout		2,395		
Green gain from Liberal Democrats		Swing	▲6.2	

=== Petersfield ===
Petersfield
Party	Candidate	Votes	%	±%
Labour	Michael Davey*	1,323	51.9	+2.4
Green	Zakariyah Karimjee	558	21.9	+4.8
Liberal Democrats	Sam Oliver	399	15.6	–3.8
Conservative	Paul Roper	226	8.9	–5.2
Freedom Alliance	Christopher Wilkinson	44	1.7	N/A
Majority		765	23.1	
Turnout		3,315		
Labour hold		Swing	▼1.2	

=== Queen Edith's ===
Queen Edith's
Party	Candidate	Votes	%	±%
Liberal Democrats	Immy Blackburn-Horgan*	1,123	42.5	+4.6
Labour	Beth Gardiner-Smith	758	28.7	+5.0
Conservative	Eric Barrett-Payton	459	17.4	–2.0
Green	Oliver Fisher	300	11.4	+1.2
Majority		365	12.1	
Turnout		3,005		
Liberal Democrats hold		Swing	▼0.2	

=== Romsey ===
Romsey
Party	Candidate	Votes	%	±%
Labour	Dave Baigent*	1,433	52.2	+6.7
Green	Iain Webb	524	19.1	–1.6
Liberal Democrats	John Walmsley	307	11.2	–3.3
Independent	William Bannell	273	9.9	N/A
Conservative	Robin Nelson	208	7.6	–11.6
Majority		909	24.9	
Turnout		3,654		
Labour hold		Swing	▲4.2	

=== Trumpington ===
Trumpington
Party	Candidate	Votes	%	±%
Liberal Democrats	Nadya Lokhmotova	944	36.4	+0.8
Labour Co-op	Carlos Toranzos	836	32.3	+3.5
Conservative	Steven George	481	18.6	–4.5
Green	Chloe Mosonyi	331	12.8	+0.3
Majority		108	4.0	
Turnout		2,700		
Liberal Democrats hold		Swing	▼1.4	

=== West Chesterton ===
West Chesterton
Party	Candidate	Votes	%	±%
Labour	Sam Carling*	1,290	42.9	+0.5
Liberal Democrats	Jamie Dalzell	1,082	36.0	+3.4
Green	Shayne Mitchell	397	13.2	+1.5
Conservative	Michael Harford	236	7.9	–5.4
Majority		208	6.5	
Turnout		3,213		
Labour hold		Swing	▼1.5	

== Changes 2024-2026 ==
=== Romsey ===
In August 2025 Councillor Dave Baigent announced he had resigned from Labour but intended to remain as a councillor. He said he was seeking to set up a branch of Your Party.

=== By-elections ===
==== Romsey ====
Romsey by-election: 12 September 2024
Party	Candidate	Votes	%	±%
Labour	Beth Gardiner-Smith	596	42.8	–9.4
Green	Zak Karimjee	409	29.4	+10.3
Liberal Democrats	John Walmsley	249	17.9	+6.7
Conservative	Rob Nelson	138	9.9	+2.3
Majority		187	13.4	–11.5
Turnout		1,392	20.2	
Labour hold		Swing	▼9.9	

==== East Chesterton ====
East Chesterton by-election: 1 May 2025
Party	Candidate	Votes	%	±%
Liberal Democrats	Bob Illingworth	871	33.1	+1.1
Labour	Sarah Haithcock	756	28.7	−13.4
Green	Sarah Nicmanis	478	18.2	+2.8
Reform	Mike Nicolson	301	11.4	+11.4
Conservative	Steven George	224	8.5	−2.0
Majority		115	4.4	
Turnout		2630		
Liberal Democrats gain from Labour		Swing	▲13.6	

==== West Chesterton ====
West Chesterton by-election: 1 May 2025
Party	Candidate	Votes	%	±%
Liberal Democrats	Jamie Dalzell	1,204	38.5	+2.5
Labour	Rosy Greenlees	1,030	33.0	−12.9
Green	Hannah Charlotte Copley	533	17.1	+3.9
Reform	Tommy Brace	197	6.3	+6.3
Conservative	Michael Harford	160	5.1	−2.8
Majority		174	5.6	
Turnout		3124		
Liberal Democrats gain from Labour		Swing	▲15.4	
