= Newnham, Cambridgeshire =

Suburb and electoral ward in Cambridge, United Kingdom

Coordinates: 52.1981°N 0.1084°E

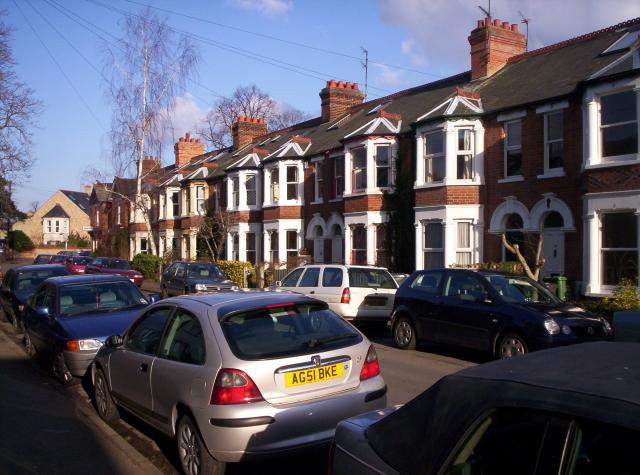
Eltisley Avenue – a typical street in Newnham Croft

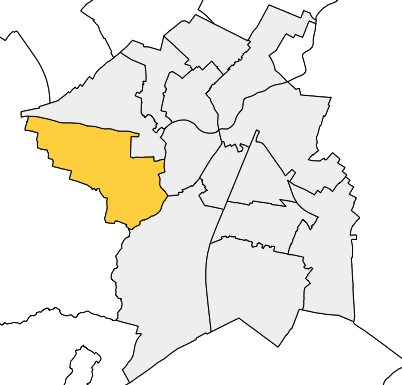
The electoral boundary of Newnham ward

Newnham is a suburb and electoral ward in Cambridge, England. As of the 2021 UK census, the ward had a population of 11,374.

== History ==
The early hamlet of Newnham was situated on the west bank of the River Cam, on an island of permanently dry land. The surrounding land was liable to flooding, particularly during the winter months. A permanent cut of the river leads to the Newnham watermill, which predated the Norman conquest of 1066, and is mentioned in the Domesday Book of 1086. The hamlet was linked to the town of Cambridge by a series of small bridges and fords over the various channels of the River Cam. A road led to the nearby village of Grantchester.

In 1256, the Carmelite order of monks established a convent in Newnham, with a church, cloister, dormitory and other buildings. Over the next 50 years, the order gradually moved from a contemplative tradition to more interactive religious practices. This, along with the fact that the convent was frequently cut off from Cambridge by winter flooding, led the order to move to Cambridge in 1292.

In the late 19th century, after the enclosure of the Cambridge fields, Newnham Croft was constructed – a middle-class suburb located partly within the Cambridge town boundary, and partly within the parish of Grantchester. In 1870, a church was built to serve the growing community. Initially, St Mark's Church on Barton Road (A603) was a daughter church to the parish of Grantchester. Newnham Croft was incorporated into the borough of Cambridge in 1911; Newnham was created as a separate parish in 1918. It is served by Newnham Croft Primary School.

From 1885, Sir George Darwin (son of Charles Darwin) lived in Newnham Grange (built in 1793), where he raised his children (including Sir Charles Darwin and Gwen Raverat). After the death of Sir Charles, son of Sir George, the building was acquired by the newly founded Darwin College.

The modern council ward of Newnham covers much of the west of the city. Several University of Cambridge colleges are situated in this ward, including Newnham, Wolfson, Robinson, Selwyn and Darwin. Newnham has become one of the most affluent areas of Cambridge and has featured highly in some national quality of life surveys.

Newnham includes Grantchester Meadows and Lammas Land, a recreation ground and playground.

== Councillors ==
Members of Cambridge City Council for Newnham ward have included:

- Ruth Cohen (economist), former Principal of Newnham College
- Robert Edwards (physiologist), Nobel Prize winner
- Lucy Nethsingha, MEP
- Wendy Nicol, Baroness Nicol
- Julie Smith, Baroness Smith of Newnham
