= Cambridge and St Ives branch line =

The Cambridge and St Ives branch (as it is named on New Popular Editions Ordnance Survey maps) was a railway built by the Wisbech, St Ives & Cambridge Junction Railway in the late 1840s. The railway ran from Cambridge in the south, through Fenland countryside to the market town of St Ives; more specifically, the line ran from Chesterton Junction, where it met the present-day Fen line north of the River Cam.

Passenger services along the line managed to survive the Beeching Axe, but with British Rail citing heavy losses the final passenger service ran between St Ives and Cambridge on 5 October 1970. Despite campaigns to reopen the service during the 1970s, the only subsequent rail traffic on the line was a freight service to Chivers in Histon which ran until 1983 and a contract to ferry sand from ARC at Fen Drayton which continued until May 1992.

The railway now forms the alignment of the northern section of the Cambridgeshire Guided Busway, a bus rapid transit scheme.

== Stations ==
Stations listed northwest to south, in the 'up' direction

- St. Ives – opened 17 August 1847, closed 5 October 1970.
- Swavesey – opened 17 August 1847, closed 5 October 1970.
- Long Stanton (or Longstanton) – opened 17 August 1847, closed 5 October 1970.
- Oakington – opened 17 August 1847, closed 5 October 1970.
- Histon – opened 17 August 1847, closed 5 October 1970.
- Chesterton – opened 19 January 1850, closed October 1850.
- Cambridge – opened 30 July 1845.

== What remains ==
On its 2011 opening, the Cambridgeshire Guided Busway route absorbed the majority of the old railway between St Ives and the point at which the bus joined public roads at Milton Road. The remaining section between the former level crossing over Milton Road and the Fen line was converted to an extension to the Guided Busway in 2015 to join it to the planned Cambridge North railway station.
