= St. Andrew's Church, Oakington =

Church building in England

Coordinates: 52.2632°N 0.0718°E

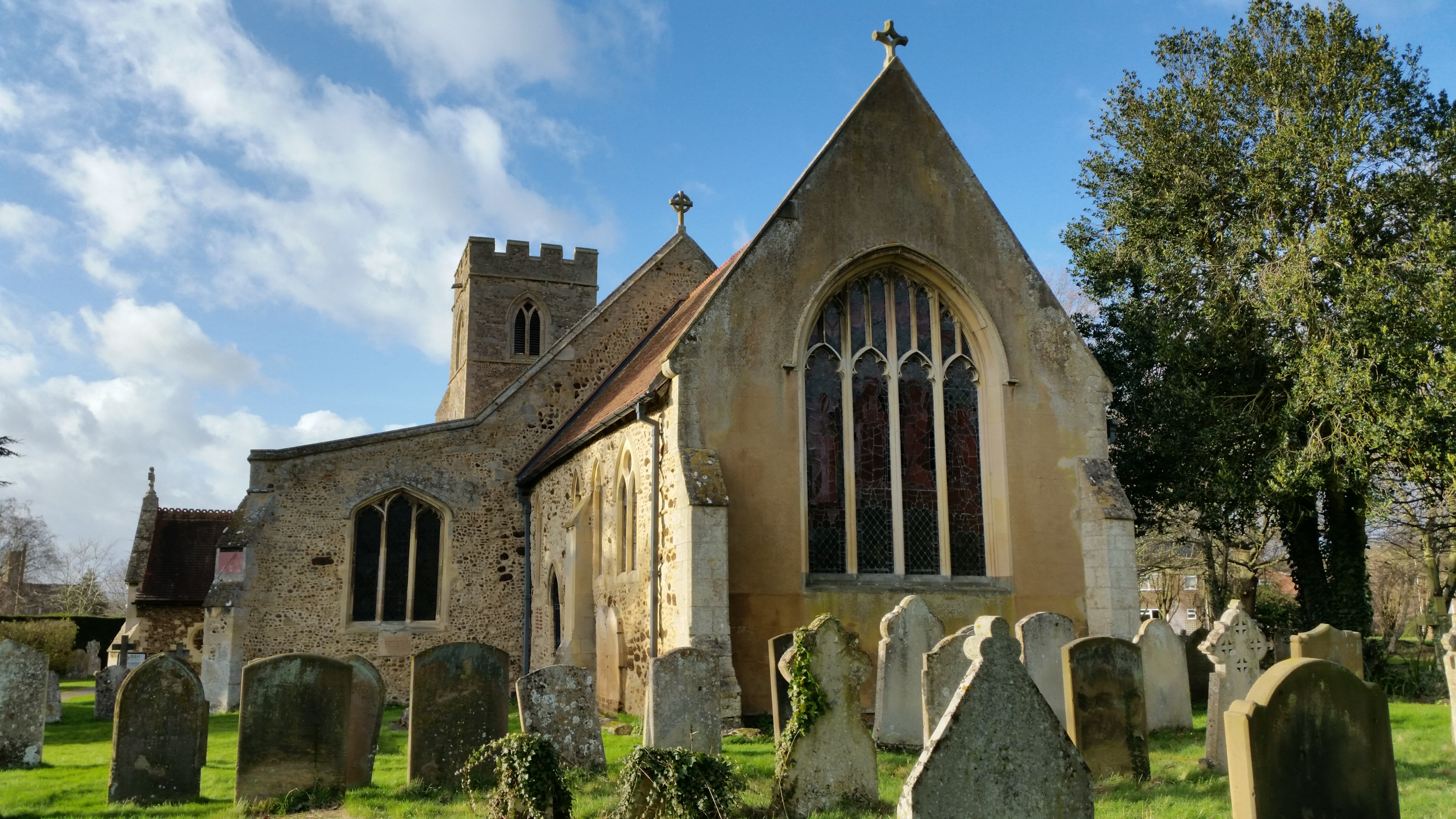
St Andrew's from south east

St Andrew's Church is a parish church in Oakington, England. Parts of the thick walls of the nave above the arcading, and the base of the tower in the church are the earliest surviving parts of it, likely from the 12th century.

The church was rebuilt in the 13th century, with the addition of a narrow south aisle with tiny lancet windows, and larger ones in the chancel. In the 14th century, the tower was heightened, and the aisles and chancel arch were widened. The tower arch was widened in the 15th century. The south porch and the present roofs were built in the 19th century along with the enlargement of the east window. The church building is a grade II* listed building.

A Church of England parish church, it was dedicated to St. Andrew in 1490, and the parish register of baptisms, marriages and burials dates from 1561; it is virtually complete, with a gap 1696-1708.

== Exterior of the church ==
=== West tower ===
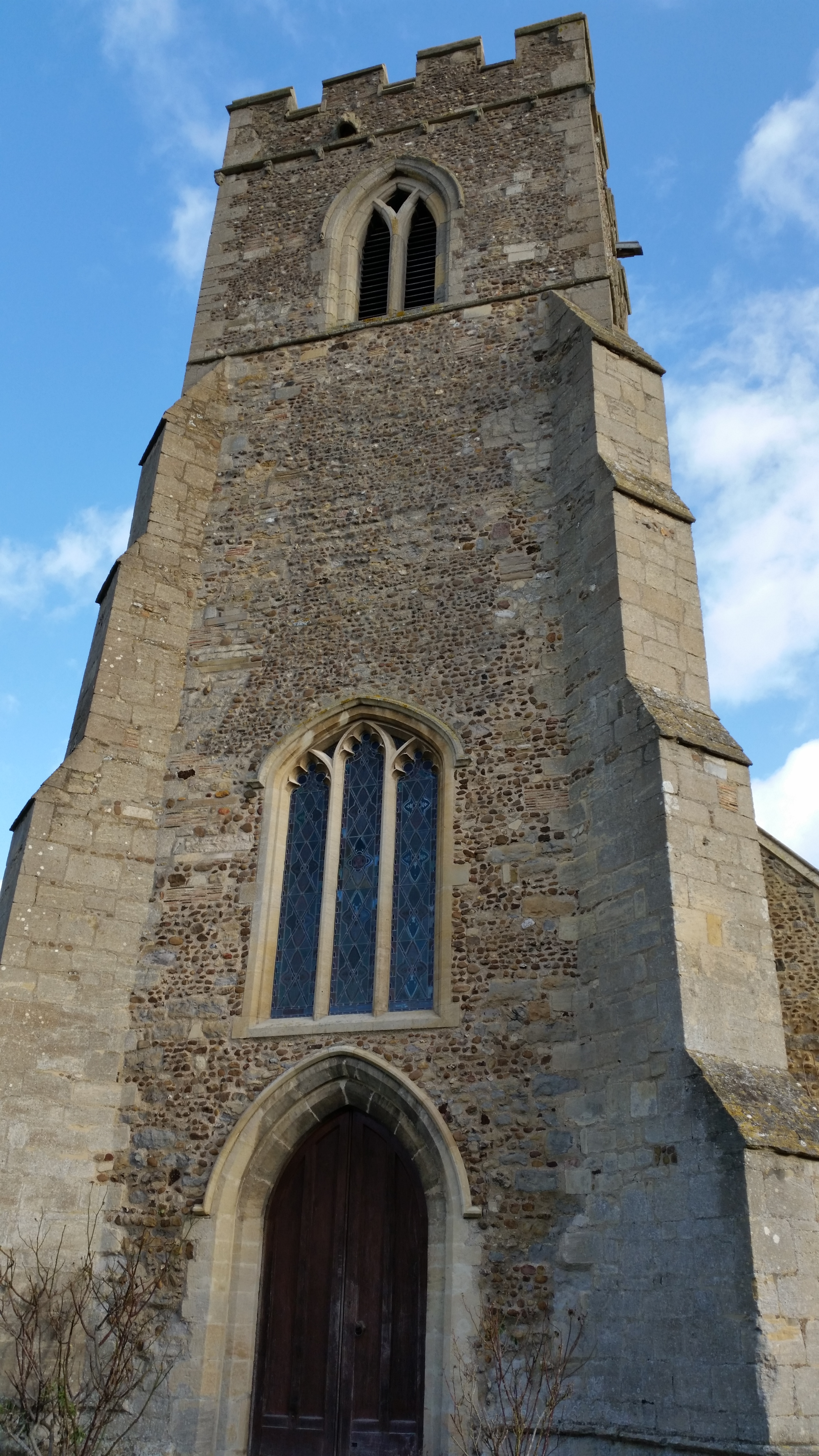
St Andrew's, West tower

The Perpendicular west tower with earlier work is built of pebblestone and rubblestone with some re-used tiles. The base of the tower was probably built in the 12th century, the same time as the thick walled nave. The tower was heightened in the 14th century, embattled and buttressed on the west in the 15th century. The four stages of diagonal buttresses are made of ashlar stone. There are gargoyles below the embattled parapet decorated with stone faces.

There was once a weathercock mounted on the tower roof, now it is on the roof of the shed in the vicarage garden.

Perhaps the west doorway and the window over it were inserted in the lower stage of the tower in the late 14th or early 15th century. The higher windows are from earlier, late 13th or early 14th century. The three timber louvred windows were re-instated in 1963.

The west doorway's two-centred arch with chamfered orders, was renewed in 1843-4. The doors are open for weddings and some Sunday services. The west window above was restored in 1885.

=== South aisle ===
The 13th century south aisle was re-built in the 14th century. The roof and lead covering were replaced in the 19th century. Further extensive repairs to the roof timbers and lead guttering were undertaken in 2002.

On the exterior of the west wall of the south aisle, there is a blocked-up, narrow lancet window close to the line of the aisle arcade. This was obviously a west window of a 13th-century aisle, much narrower than the 14th century one that appears today.

On the east face of the tower at the abutment of the nave roof, the water table of the earlier 13th century nave roof is still visible above the present roof and is much steeper, suggesting that the earlier roof was probably thatched. The present roofs to both nave and aisles were renewed in 1843-4 with new tiling to the nave and lead to the aisles.

The stone cross built into the west wall of the south aisle was originally on the east end of the nave roof. It was blown off in the gales of c.1978. The builders incorporated the cross in the wall during repair and repointing work.

The new stone cross of the nave roof was designed by Brian Page, based on this one.

There are six three-light, foil-headed windows in the south aisle.

The present south porch was built in 1890, replacing the earlier one that was demolished in c. 1843.

The curved lines of stones at the base of the outside of the south aisle are probably relieving arches for a crypt. Tombs were excavated there around 1838.

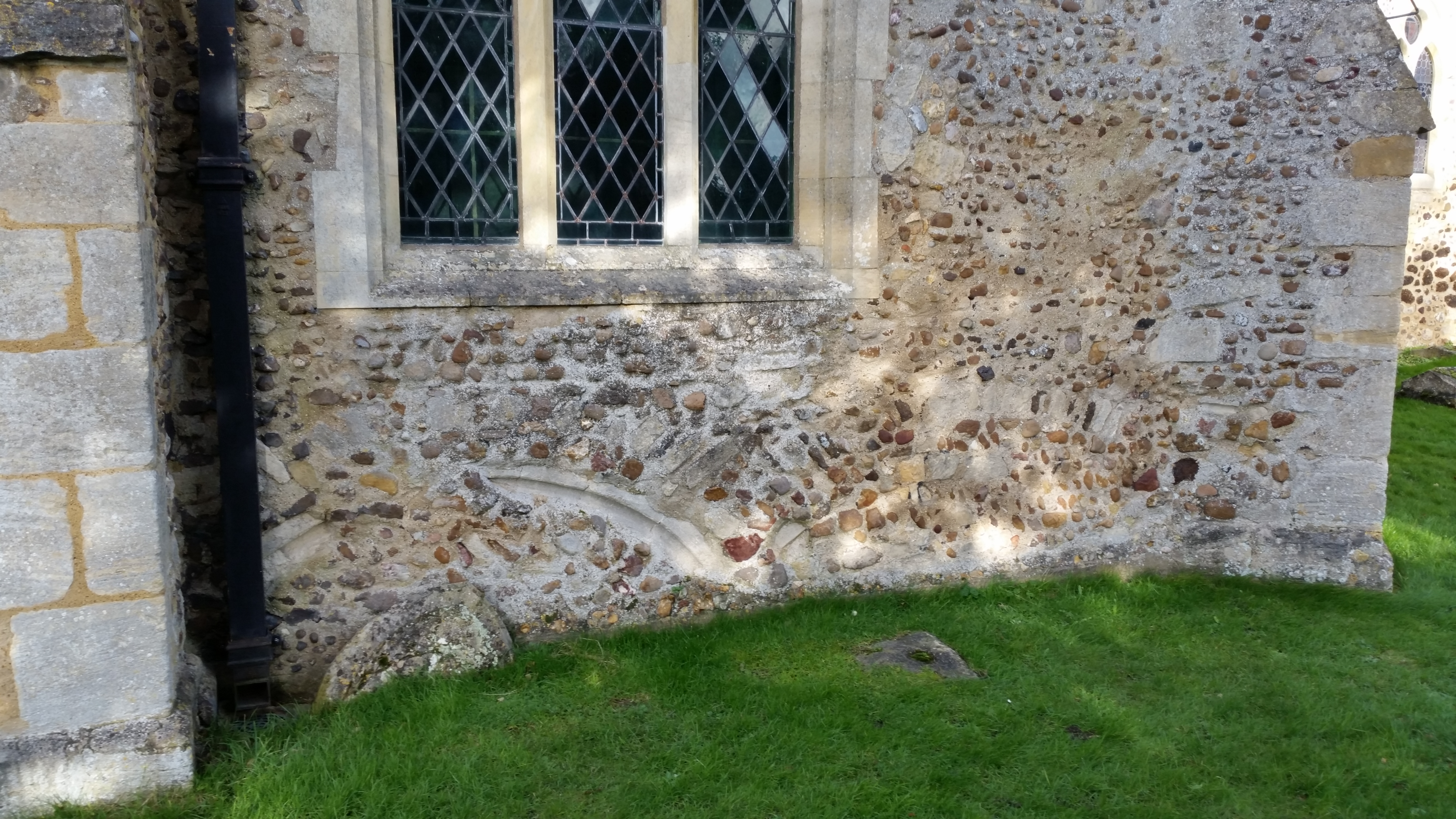
Relieving arches of a crypt

There is a sundial (f) at the east corner buttress of the south aisle with the inscription 'God always cares'. The numbers seem older than the writing.

=== Chancel ===
The chancel is from the early 13th century. Its walls contain pudding stones. There are three lancet windows on each side, with chamfered internal arches. On the south side, there is another double light window with plate tracery from c. 1200 to light the altar. It has a plain circle in the head.

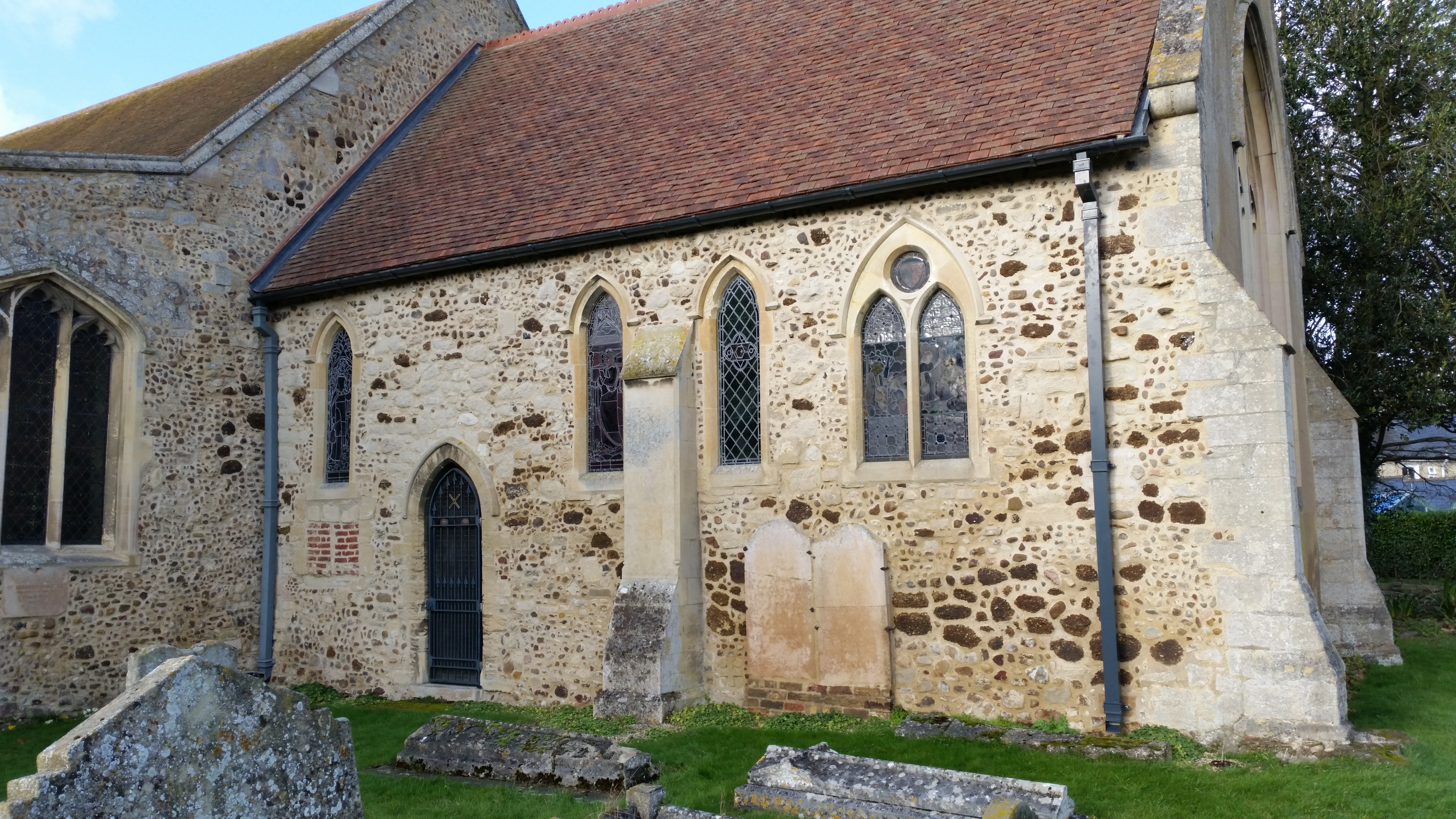
Chancel from south

There is a bricked-up lower window on each side under the lancets closest to the nave. Their framework and centre mullion are still visible. It is possible that lepers used to receive holy communion through them.

The original priest's door is on the south wall of the chancel with a single chamfered order in a pointed arch. The metal outer gate was designed and fixed in 2002 to enable air flow in the chancel in better weather conditions. It is in memory of Beulah Anne Goody (1930–1984) and Robert Joseph Goody (1919–2002).

To the right of the priest's door, there is a fragment of the stone cross that used to be on the roof, built into the wall.

On the buttress of the south-east corner of the chancel, there is a scratch dial, a primitive medieval sundial used to determine the time for devotions. A small peg was inserted in the central hole to cast a shadow on the stone.

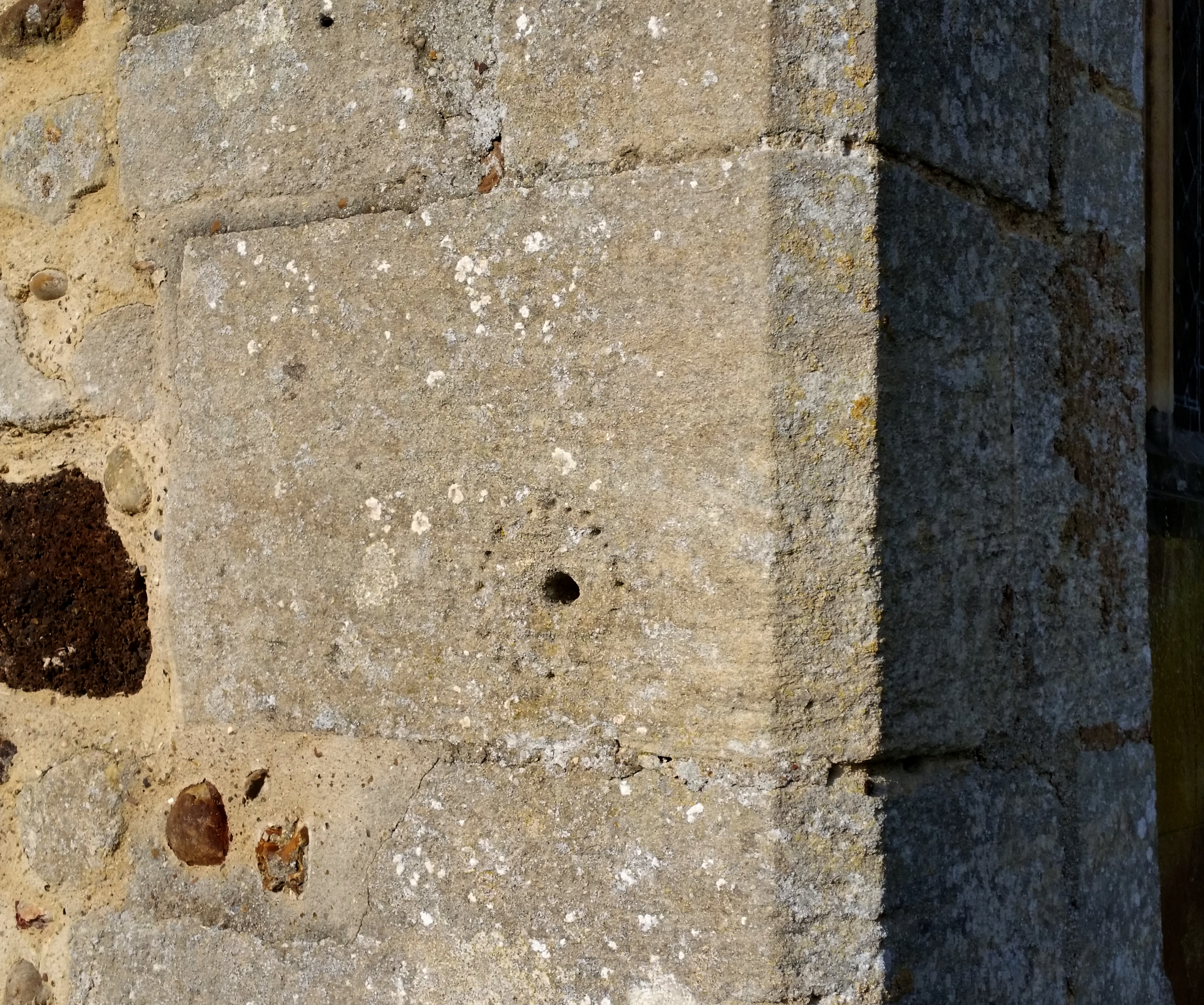
Scratch dial

The east window, copied from the north aisle windows, was enlarged during major Victorian restoration work in 1885-1889. It was restored in 1995.

At the south-east corner of the church yard, stands the Church Hall designed by the then church architect Brian Page and built in 2009.

The basis of the building fund was from earlier legacies but the major part of the cost was raised by the congregation at the time together with donations from the village community.

The purpose of the hall was to provide much needed meeting space, and the motivation was to further the church's ministry, and to offer a well-appointed venue for community groups.

Moving round to the north side of the chancel, there is another bricked-up lower window (j) under the most western lancet.

In the corner, where the north wall of the chancel meets the wall of the north aisle, there is the underground boiler house of the 1920s heating system, that was filled in 1979.

=== North aisle ===
The north aisle was probably re-built in the 15th century. Its six windows have standard Perpendicular tracery, renewed in 1843-4 and again in 1949.

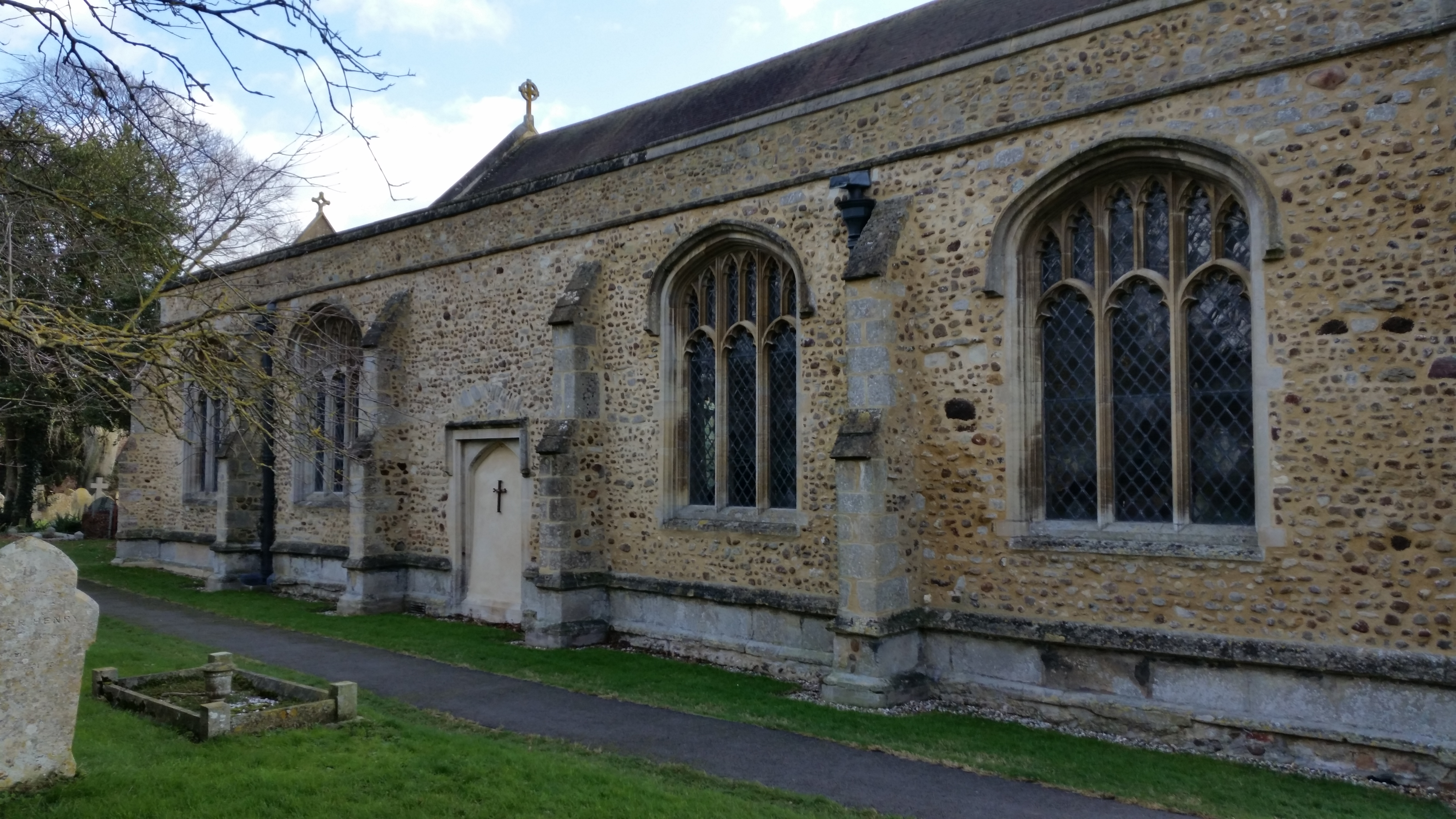
North aisle from outside

The Perpendicular north doorway was re-built in the 15th century with a four-centred arch below a square head moulding. There is a relieving arch still visible in the stonework above it. This door was probably blocked up during major restoration works in the 19th century. There used to be a St Andrew's cross made of pebbles decorating it, before it was replaced by a bronze cross as part of further restoration work in 2016.

== Interior ==
Entering the church through the south porch, note the Early English inner arch of the original south doorway which is from the 13th century. It is two-centred with two chamfered orders with the outer of restored shafts and moulded caps. Entry to the church is via the west side door of the Victorian inner lobby. The double doors are opened for services in warm summer weather and for funerals and other events.

=== West end of the south aisle ===
The font, in the west end of the south aisle, is a square Norman bowl from the 12th or 13th century, it is mounted on five octagonal pillars from the 15th century. Three sides of the basin are carved. On two sides, there is round headed semicircular arcading with three bays each; on one side, there are two bays. The undecorated side probably stood against the wall originally. The cover was given by Kenneth Oates of Histon who designed and made it. It is of old church oak. The ironwork is based on the long-boats of the invading Danes.

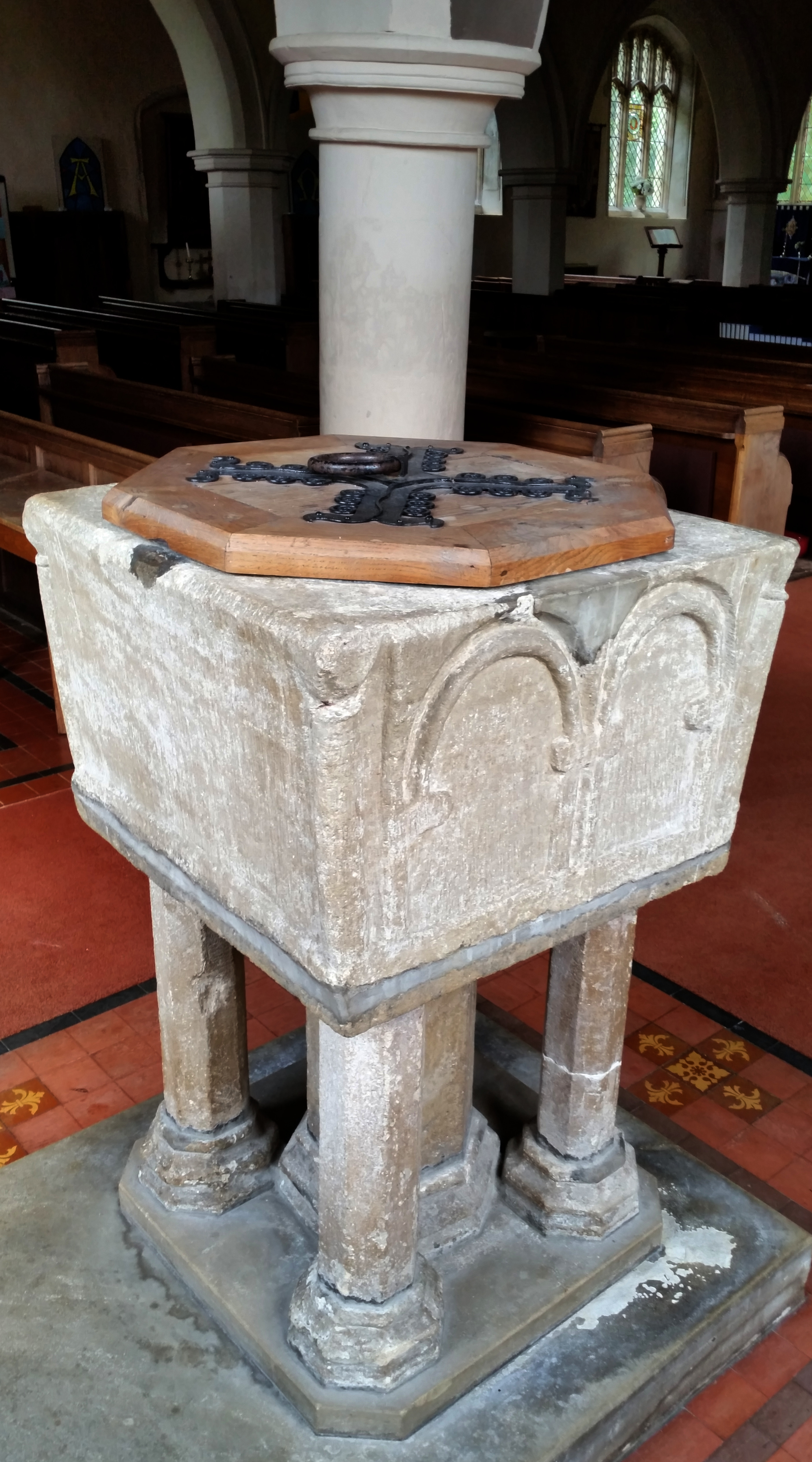
Font

The font was proposed to be removed from its present position in 1926, to be relocated near the south door and for its place to be screened off with a curtain for use as a vestry. However this project was never completed and the curtained vestry was retained within the north aisle.

The closest window to the side door of the lobby with the elephant headed arm is the Few memorial window which was completed in 1994. Previously this was a Victorian coloured glass window. The Dutch inscription of the arm 'Niet zonder arbeit' means 'Nothing without work'. Harry Selwyn Spicer Few (1918–1992), a prominent solicitor of Few & Kester Solicitors, Cambridge, used to live in Coles Lane.

The window to the right is decorated with St Andrew with his cross. It was restored in memory of Sidney Herbert Brickwood (1916–1993), the husband of Violet Brickwood, former postmistress of Oakington. Sidney was captured and imprisoned by the Japanese during WWII.

The window at the west end of the south aisle is the Millenium window with the inscription 'Year of Our Lord 2000'. A roundel of John the Baptist baptising Jesus, designed by Christopher Fiddes, was completed in 2005.

=== Nave ===
The thick walls of the nave, seen above the arcading, are the earliest surviving parts of the church from the 12th century. Both south and north arcades, each in five bays, seem to be cut roughly through the original thick Norman wall. The arches have only one small chamfer on each side.

The arcading of the south aisle with single chamfered, two-centred arches is supported by Early English circular columns, that used to be painted and were renewed in the 13th century, with moulded capitals and holdwater bases.

The octagonal columns of the north aisle are from slightly later than the south arcades, they have moulded capitals and bases. The east and west responds have Norman impost mouldings. If you look at the columns closely, you can see many engravings on them.

You may also notice the columns to both north and south aisles are out of plumb due to the outward thrust of the nave roof over many years. The installation of tie rods in 1970 was to overcome the possibility of this becoming a risk to the structure.

The nave floor was re-levelled in the late 19th century and new oak pews were installed by Dr Sewell, vicar. In both aisles, the old softwood pews were replaced by cushioned hardwood chairs in 1987.

Near the tower doors, there is a metal cover in the floor for the control of an old underfloor heating system. Its boiler is still under the nave floor. Its chimney went up inside the tower.

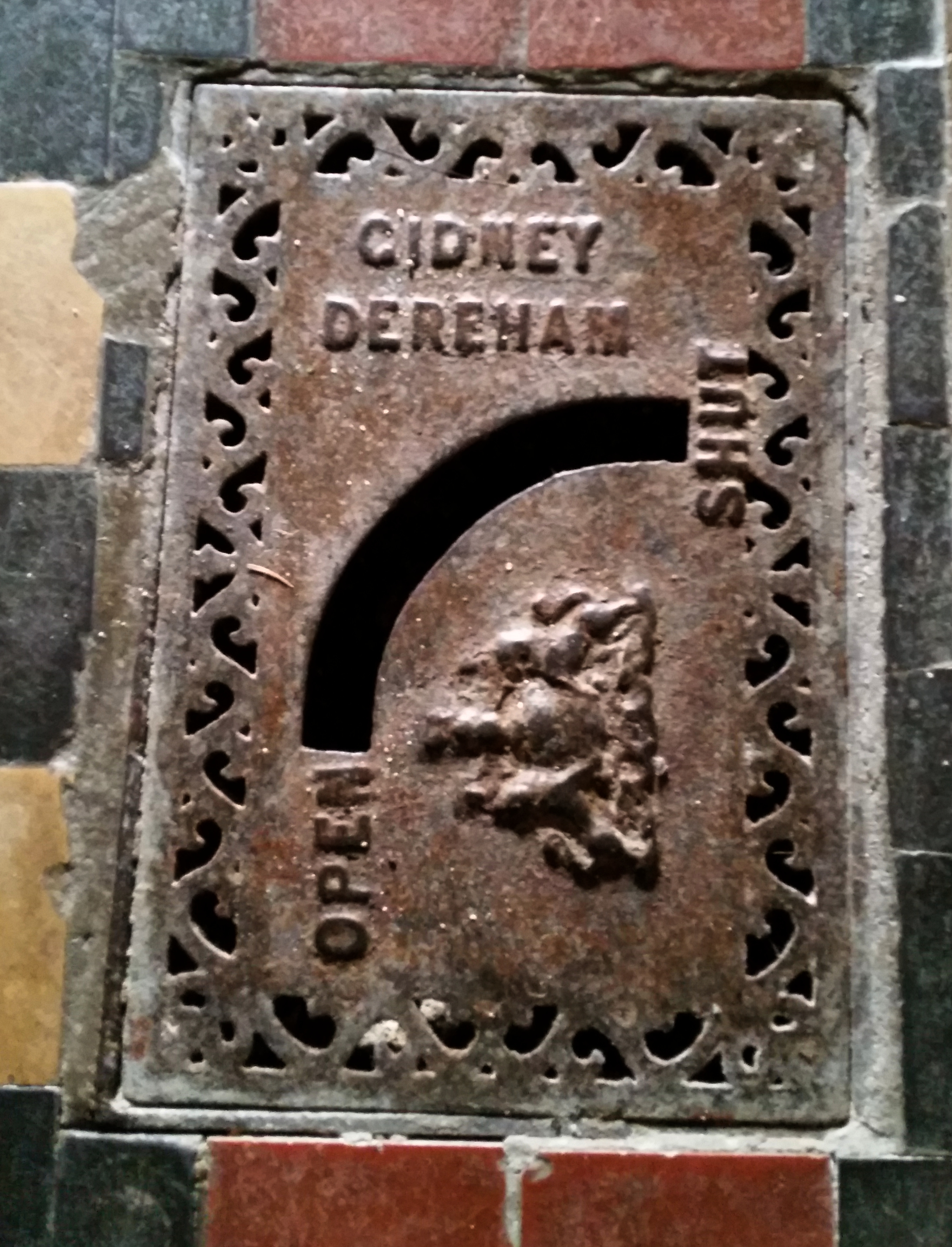
Heating control

It was the forerunner of a more comprehensive coal-fired installation, completed in 1923. Its underground boiler house is located outside at the north side of the chancel. It used to feed large cast iron radiators. Electricity was connected in 1948 when electric lighting replaced oil pendant fittings. The present fittings were made locally and installed in 1986. Electric pew heating was installed in 1966, and upgraded in 1995 and 2023.

=== Tower ===
The 14th-century tower arch was widened in the 15th century. Note the two stone faces finishing its hood-mould. They might be faces of the builders themselves or well-known faces of that time.

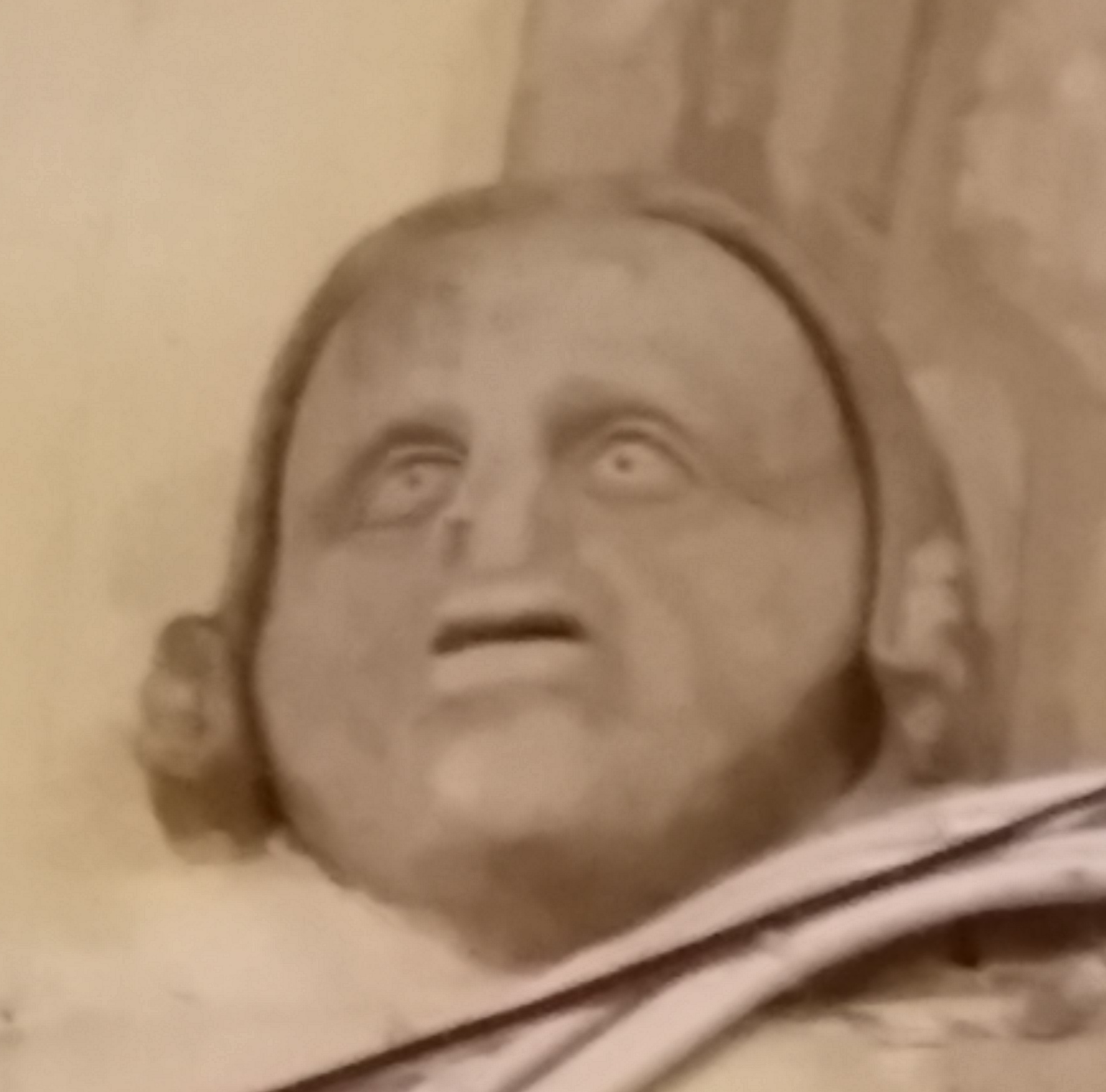
Stone face on the left

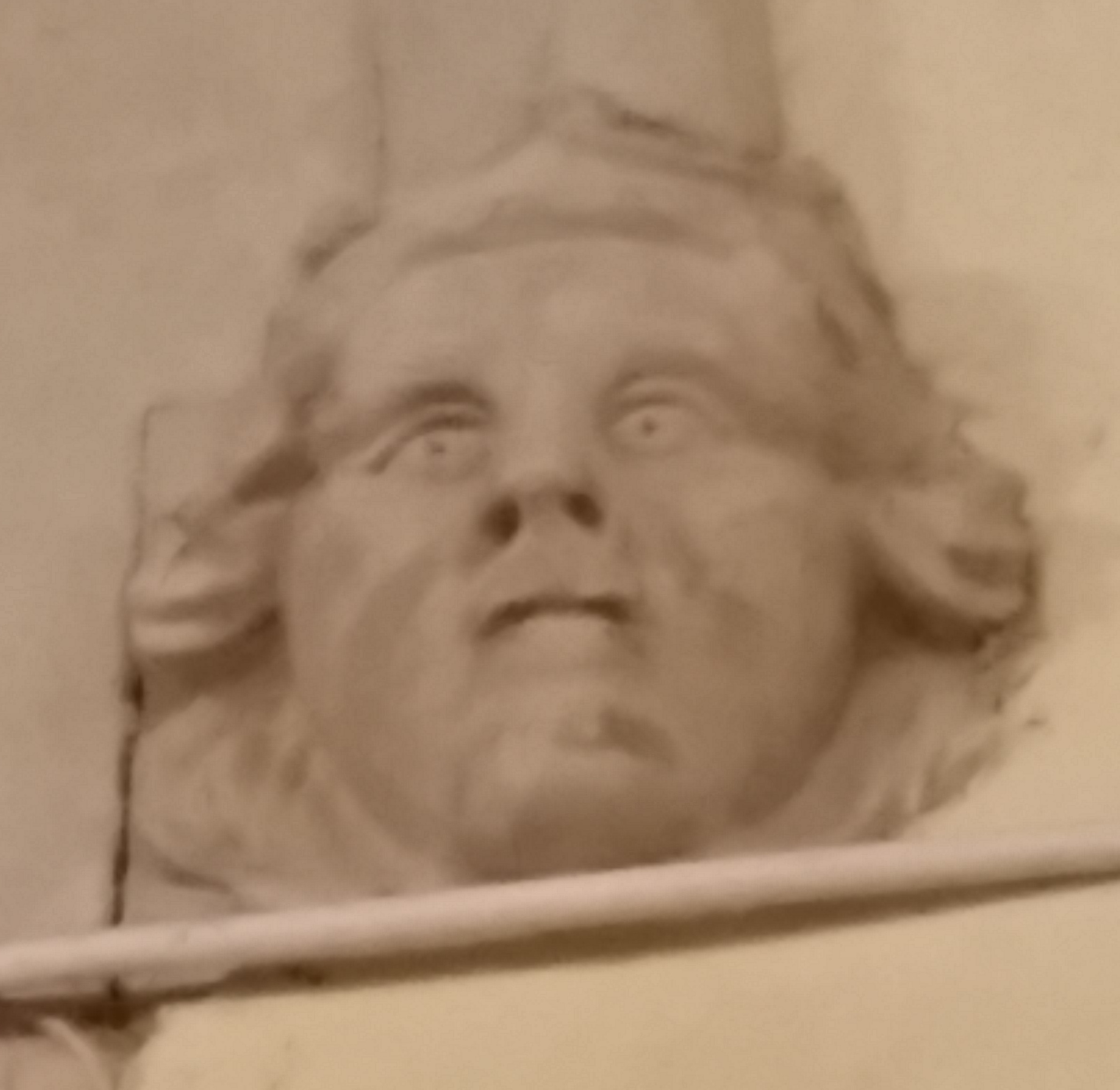
Stone face on the right

Two 13th-century coffin lids with foliated crosses and omega ornament were found under the floor in 1850. They are displayed on either side of the tower arch. In 1911, they were recorded as being built into the interior of the north and west wall.

The tower room and ringing gallery were created in 1993. Before that, bellringers rang the bells from the ground floor using long ropes that were difficult to control. The room is separated from the nave by a glazed oak screen and doors and contains storage cupboards and fittings.

A circular stone plaque, designed and made by Mark Bury, on the south wall of the tower room, installed in 1994, tells us that the tower room and oak screen are dedicated to the memory of Jack Moore, a friend of this church; the ringing floor and seating are in memory of Patricia Devine, Beulah Anne Goody and Bunny Moore who was a bell ringer here for sixty years; the cupboards are in memory of Margaret Bilton.

The circular trapdoor in the ringing floor above provides access for bells if lowered for repair. A spiral staircase leads up to the oak ringing floor that has a seated balcony and glass screen protection.

The inscription on the tower west window reads 'This church was restored AD 1885-88.'

The timber floor of the belfry was removed and re-installed in 1963. Access to the bell chamber was improved in 2018 with a new ladder and slide-back hatchway.

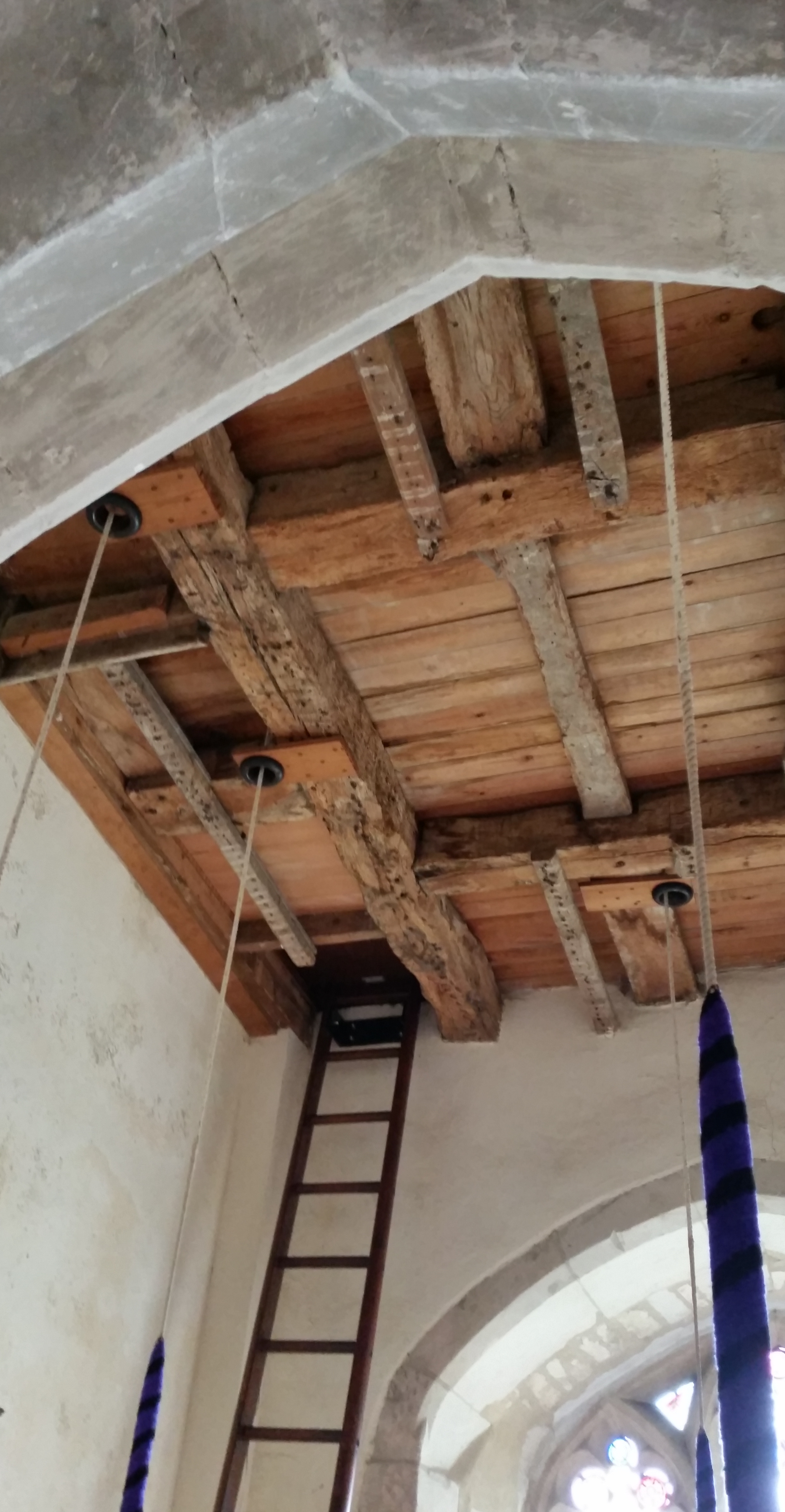
Belfry

The six bells are not at the top of the tower but lower down where the narrow louvre is on the south face of the tower.

In 1744, the church had four bells. Three of those were recorded in 1552, recast in c.1655. One was recast in 1748. Two of the bells were recast in Colchester and have the inscriptrion 'Miles Gray made me 1655'. The tenor weighs 5cwt, its inscription reads 'Miles Graie 1655' One bell was recast by Joseph Eayre of St Neots, it is inscribed 'Omnia fiant ad gloriam Dei (Let it all be to the glory of God). W. Hemmington, C.W., 1748.'

In 1978, two more bells were added, making six in total. In the ringing gallery there is a polished oak memorial tablet, in the shape of two bells and a photo dated 1977 below it, they record the installation of the six bells on a steel frame carried out by local bellringers and friends including Roger Kendrick, James Alexander, Ian West, Graham Miner, Tony Moore and Bunny Moore. Donations were given in memory of Evelyn Parish, George Barker, Percy Maskall, Jean Papworth, Phillis Topham and Lily & Jack Moore in memory of their parents.

The treble's inscription reads 'Taylor Loughborough 1977 Non clamor sed amor in aure Dei cantat' (It is not the sound but the love that sings in the ear of God.) The second bell is inscribed with the following names: 'Taylor Loughborough 1978, J. Alexander, G. Brasnett, M. Cleaver, A. Moore, D. Moore, P. Moore' The four original bells used to be at the top of the tower on an oak frame, but they were lowered and fixed on a steel frame when the extra two were added to ensure that the tower structure would remain sufficiently strong and stable.

=== North aisle ===
The vestry enclosure is at the west end of the north aisle. The two-metre high oak screen was installed in 1990. Previously the vestry area was draped in various curtains, and it had half-height softwood panels internally.

The wall mounted war memorial was installed against the blocked north doorway in 1920. It is a wooden tryptych with a sculpted Crucifixion scene inside with Christ, Virgin Mary and St John, under shields bearing the arms of Canterbury and Ely. On the inside of the two doors, there are fifteen names of men fallen in World War I. The war shrine was designed by Warham Guild.

In 1920, when the war shrine was first erected, there was a shelf under it for candlesticks with two hammered copper vases given by the boys and girls of the Sunday school. It was recorded that the War Memorial had a painted Nativity scene outside, but it cannot be seen anymore. Further seven names for WWII are on the extension to the base panels. In 2012, the name of Andrew Fentiman was added. He was an infantry man and a resident of Oakington, killed in Afghanistan in 2009, the year when the Church Hall was built. His grave by the vicarage wall is maintained by the Commonwealth War Graves Commission. The extra panel was made by Derek Hunt joiner in Mark Bury's Workshop in Longstanton Road, Oakington.

The banner of the Women's Section of British Legion was hung above the War Memorial in 2010. Below the war memorial is a 13th-century stone coffin that was discovered half-embedded in the south wall of the south aisle, three feet below the present surface, by workmen repairing the foundations of the church, in 1839. The masonry above it was supported by an arch of Norman design but probably from the Perpendicular period. They had to loosen the foundations to remove the coffin. Originally, it was placed in the north-west corner of the church, near the font. The coffin lid is decorated with a foliated cross and omega ornament.

Remnants of the lower portion on an old rood screen are from the 15th century. There are small areas of original red and green paint on the panels, but the paintings do not survive. Originally, the screen probably stood at the chancel entrance. It might have been more than three metres high overall. The rood or crucifix would have been placed high on the rood screen. In 1911 and in 1935, they were recorded to stand at the west side of the south aisle, by the font. Later, the two pieces used to stand on the two side walls of the sanctuary. They were restored and fixed on each side of the War Memorial in 1990.

In 1949, the clunch stonework of at least five of the north aisle windows was in a state of advanced disintegration, so the Diocese of Ely gave permission to have the windows repaired one by one, replacing the clunch with local Ketton stone by the design of Kenneth Lindsay.

The window to the right of the War Memorial was restored in 2000 in memory of Ronald Stearn (1922–1999) and Edna Stearn (1923–1987) with the roundel of Feeding of the Five Thousand.

The wall hung tapestry is Mrs Valerie Mayo's work, it was installed in the 1990s. It depicts significant aspects of the village's history and of the church.

In the most eastern window of the north wall, a panel was created of fragments of old glass surrounding the ancient glass roundel of St John from c.1300-1450.

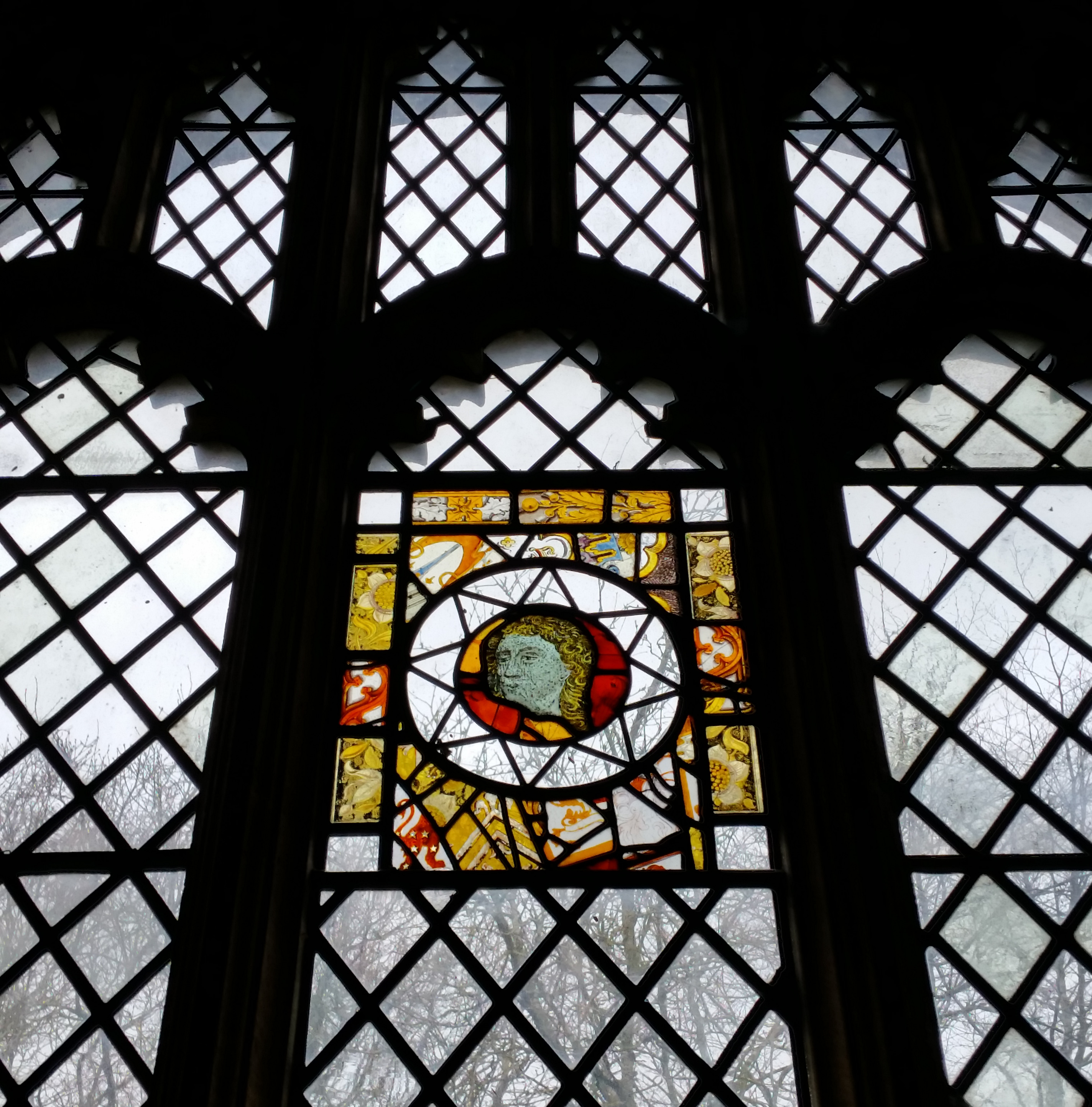
Ancient glass fragments

Under this window, there is a stone vase dedicated to the memory of Stuart Anthony Page who died at the age of 17, in a motorbike accident at the crossroads, in 1977.

The Lady Chapel is at the east end of the north aisle. In 1926, the Diocese of Ely gave permission to install an altar table designed by Leech &Son, Cambridge, with frontal and a curtain behind.

In 1937, permission was granted for installing altar rails before the altar to commemorate the coronation of King George VI. They were designed by the vicar Rev William Walter Lillie.

The present altar frontal was designed in 1988 by Rosalind Blundell-Jones local resident, based on a springtime Fenland scene with blue rear curtains on wrought iron rail. It was installed in 1990 under the direction of Marian Cleaver assisted by Pat Loweth and other ladies of the parish.

The window the altar was restored in memory of Rachel Mary Burdett (1920–1994) of Westwick Hall.

Two Perpendicular image niches from the 15th century flank the Burdett window with cusped ogee arches and small vaulted canopies, suggesting that a chantry chapel was here.

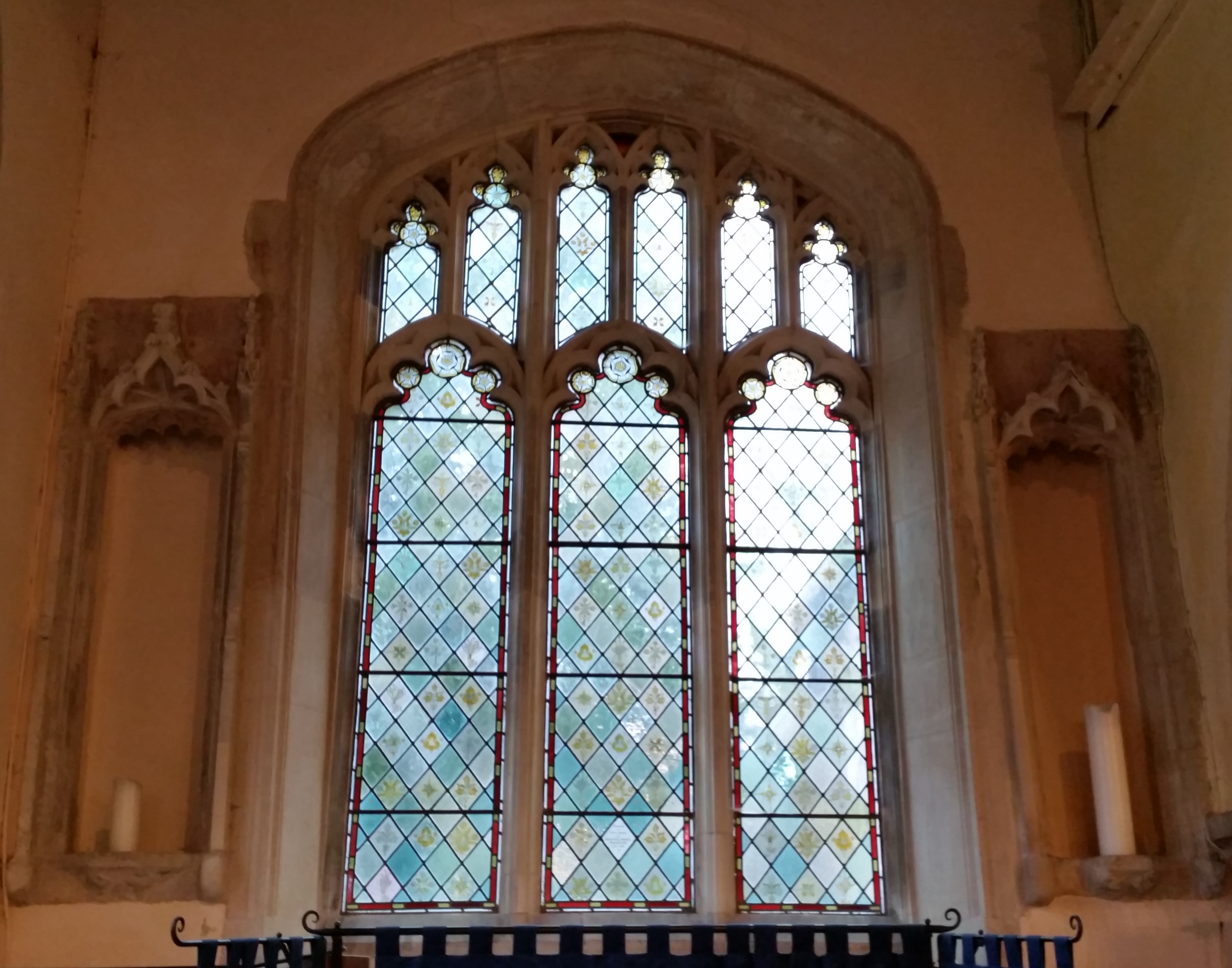
Niches

The Mothers' Union banner with the Virgin and child depicted, is from the late 19th century.

The first pew on each side of the nave was removed and repositioned by the font in 2014 to create additional space for musicians and audio equipment, including cabling under the area of new floor tiling. The front panels were reinstalled on the next pews. There is now a brass plate on the front pew opposite the pulpit, with the inscription 'Dedicated to the glory of God and in loving memory of Anthony John Waddelow 1939-2014'. John became a Christian late in his life. He was very keen to help Alan Maskall church warden, so he was lovingly given the title 'church warden's assistant'. He died 'on duty', on his way out of the church.

The oak pulpit was probably installed in 1902 by the Chivers family. The memorial crucifix of carved oak, designed by the Mowbrays, was installed in 1938. Its donors wished to remain anonymous.

Below the chancel step, two 17th-century black marble tomb slabs are built into the floor. They were reset to their rightful places over the graves to which they belong, in 1926. Previously they were resting on the floor of the present Lady Chapel for sixty years, having been taken up in c. 1866 when the nave floor was tiled.

=== Chancel ===
The Early English chancel was probably built in the early 13th century. The chancel arch, with half-octagon responds, Perpendicular capitals and moulding, was widened in the 14th century around the time the nave arcades were built.

The ceiling of the chancel was originally painted in 1902 according to the inscription found in 1986 when it was re-painted by members of the community using stencil patterns. The inscription on the north side reads 'I will magnify Thee o God my King' and on the south side 'and I will praise Thy Name for ever and ever.'

According to the inscription found on the rear of the south side choir stalls in 1984, when the chancel was re-plastered, the oak choir stalls were installed in 1902 by the same family involved in designing and painting the ceiling.

There are two plaques on the south side choir stall. One states that the sanctuary lamp of 1925 commemorates Jonah Dellar. The other one is in memory of James Webster Doggett choir member.

In 1935, it was recorded that the sanctuary had low panelling and a sedile of oak taken from the old squire's pew.

There are eight windows in the chancel: three lancet windows in deep chamfered arches on both the north and the south side, one with plate tracery at the east end of the south side, and the east window behind the altar.

The most western lancet window of the north wall of the chancel with the Good Shepherd is dedicated to Lindon Cole who died in 1868.

The middle window with the crucifixion is dedicated to George Whittaker who was the vicar between 1841 and 1854. Later, he had a successful career in clerical education in Canada. He died in 1882.

There is a stone plaque on each side of this window, commemorating the predecessor of Whittaker, Rev Thomas Webster (to the right) vicar for 31 years, until his death in 1840, and his widow Mary Ann (to the left).

The most eastern lancet is decorated with the Queens' College arms. It marks the purchase of living by the college in 1557. The college is still the patron. It appointed the present vicar, Rev James Crighton Alexander. The window was restored in memory of Rev Hugh Crighton Alexander, priest (1903–2000) and Monica Mary Alexander (1912–1996), the vicar's parents.

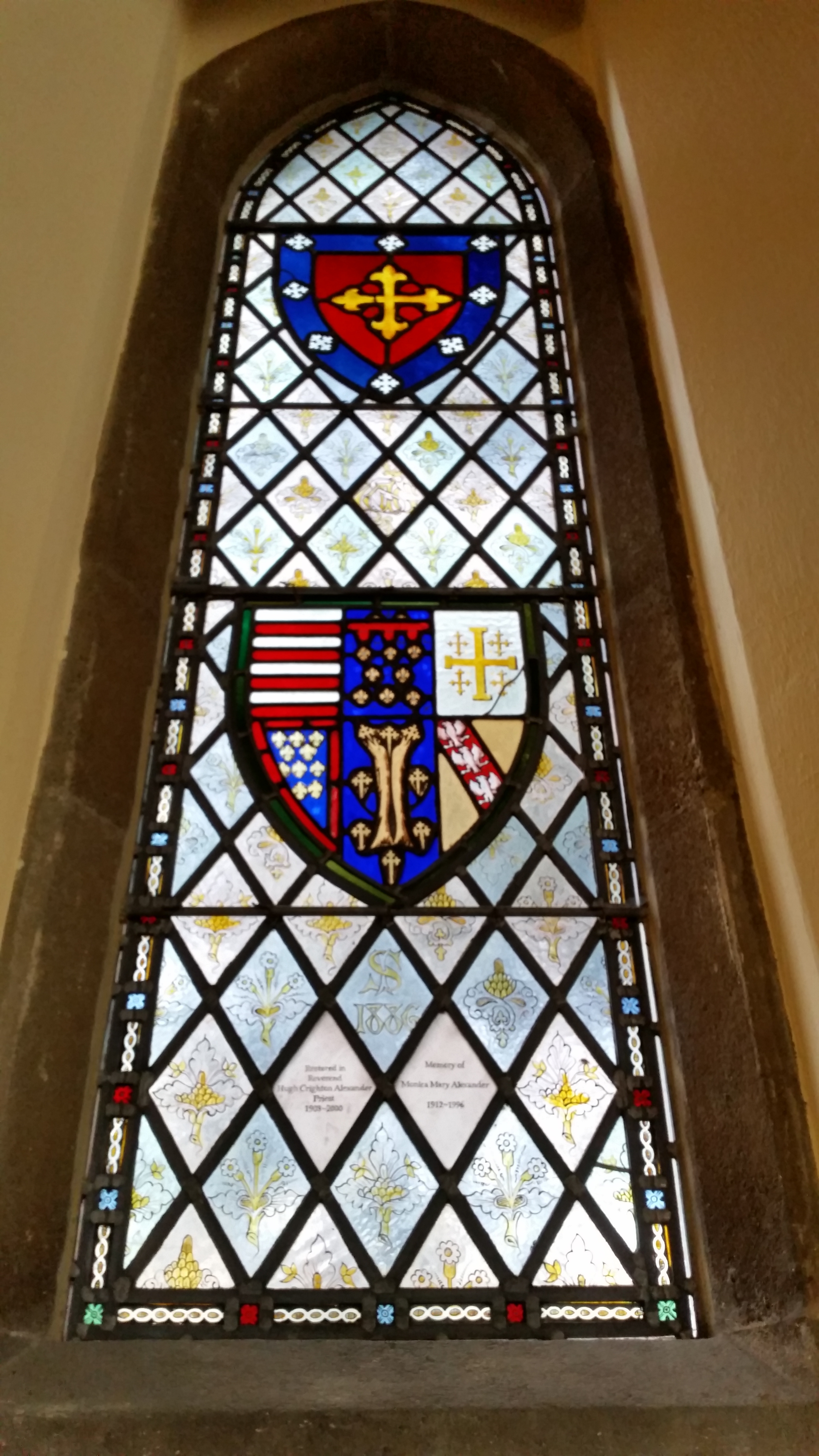
Queens College arms window

There are two dates on two glass diamonds at the top and at the bottom of the window: 1886 and 1874.

Queens' College was founded by Margaret of Anjou in 1448. The college incorporated the Hostel of St Bernard, a lodging for students. The queen named her foundation after her favourite saint, St Margaret of Antioch, calling it 'The Queens's College of Sainte Margarite Virgine and Martyr of St Bernard Confessor'. These two saints are represented on the two sides of the east window.

The east window was enlarged during major Victorian restoration works in 1885-1889. The four main figures of the window are modelled on the vicar and his family around 1880. From the left, St Margaret of Antioch, with her crown, halo, dragon, flame and cross (modelled on Ermyntrude Searle), St Andrew, holding his cross (Rev William George Searle, the vicar), Etheldreda queen and saint, holding the cathedral of Ely (Margaret Searle, the vicar's daughter) and St Bernard of Clairvaux on the right (Bernard Searle, the vicar's son).

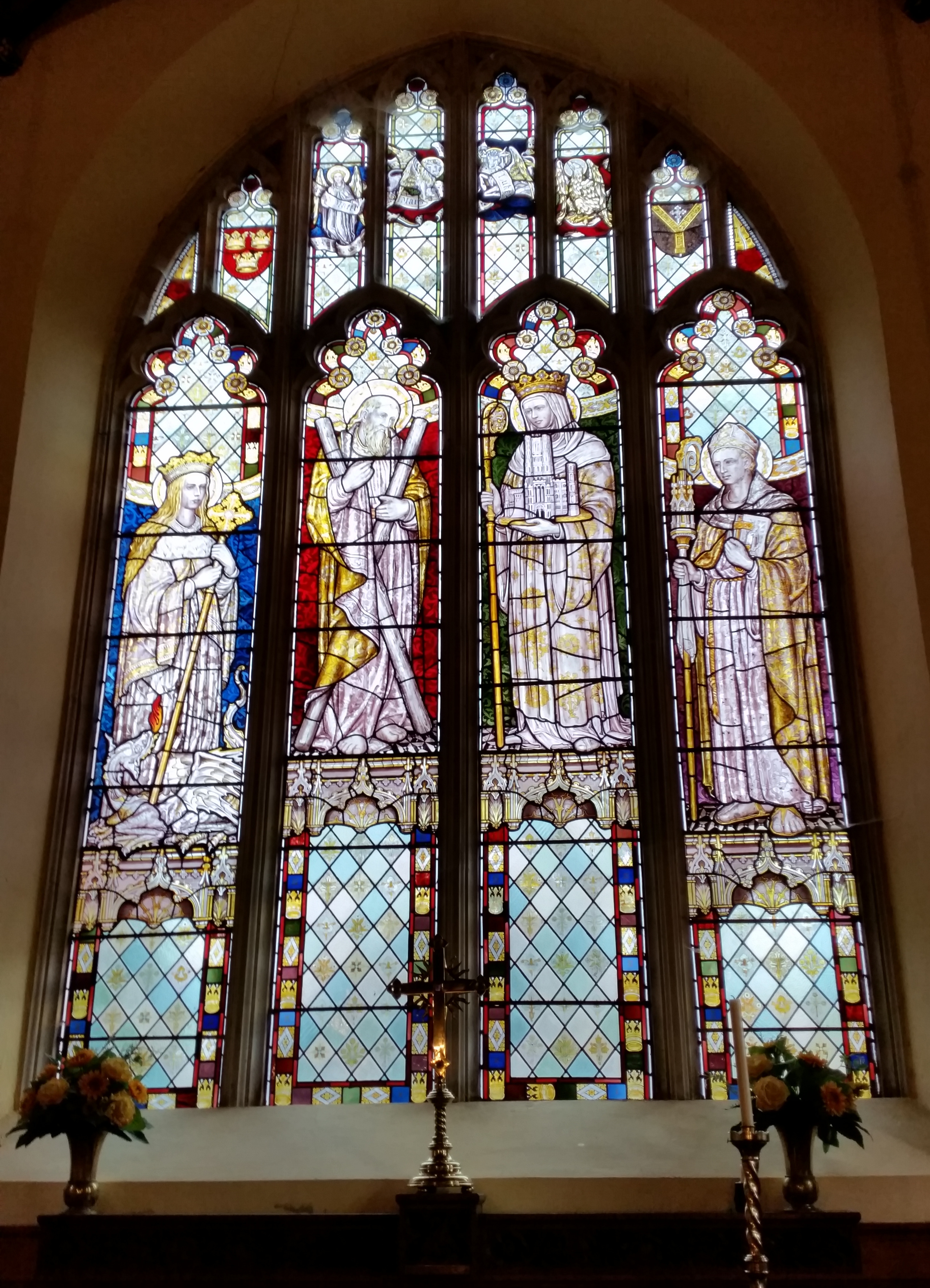
East window

W G Searle (1829–1913) was a fellow of Queens' College, the vicar of Oakington between 1858 and 1893, an antiquary, Honorary Curator of Coins at the Fitzwilliam Museum, and a historian. He researched and published about the Anglo-Saxons.

Two other family members, Friedrick and Isabelle Searle are commemorated on the south-west window of the chancel. Above the main figures, the four evangelists are represented. The east window was restored in 1995.

The sanctuary was refurbished and given an alabaster reredos behind the altar in the 1880s. In 1911, a marble reredos was recorded and that a fragment of the ancient alabaster reredos was in Cambridge Archeological Museum. During the war 1939-45, aircraft vibrations from the nearby RAF station caused damage to the reredos and it was removed soon afterwards.

The oak panelling, designed by church architect Brian Page, installed in 2000, was donated in memory of Dr Duncan McKie (1930–1999) of Wellington House in Coles Lane, and Albert Stearn (1906–1998) and Ivy May Stearn (1907–1996), donated by their son Edgar Stearn and his wife Mary, local residents.

The finely carved wooden middle part on the top of the panelling, right below the east window, is in memory of Philip Papworth of Westwick Hall who died in 1924. Note the pelican carving in the middle.

The altar was originally positioned abutting the east wall. During Rev Thomas Parker's time in 1960s, the altar was moved forward so the celebrant at holy communion could face the congregation.

There is a pair of large 19th-century candlesticks on the altar. They were purchased in 2023 to replace the previous ones that were beyond repair. They are inscribed around the base, dedicated to Alan Maskall church warden (1978–2021) with the phrase he always used: 'All for Jesus.'

The brass altar cross is in memory of Major Arthur Charles Littledale who died in France in the First World War. Its original central crystal was stolen in 1977.

There is a silver chalice with cover, probably made in c.1570, inscribed round the bowl 'For the the[sic] town of Hockyngton.' The large, silver credence paten with London hallmarks, is dated 1693, inscribed 'Ex Dono Coll. Regin.' The brass alms dish from 1888 is inscribed 'God loveth a cheerful giver.'

The communion altar kneeler was made in 2002 by the Needlework group led by Marian Cleaver. The small square recessed cabinet in the wall to the right of the altar was probably an aumbry for storing sacred vessels.

The window with plate tracery at the east end of the south wall of the chancel with two scenes from the life of Jesus, is dedicated to James Theobald of Winchester who died in 1871. On the left, we can see Jesus at the wedding of Cana with Mary and a servant (John 2:1-11). On the right, Jesus is talking to the woman of Samaria at the well (John 4:1-25). The right side of the window was restored in memory of Olive Clare (1921–1996).

The lancet to its right is decorated with the Alpha-Omega sign. It was restored in memory of Herbert (Mick) Jack (1915–1991) and Beryl Jack (1917–1994).

The communion rail was donated in 1888 by the family of Rev Thomas Webster vicar, 1809-1840. The removable middle section was installed in 1972 in memory of Mrs Shuttleworth to bridge the gap between the existing rails during communion service. It was altered in 2016, to enable it to be hinged open and closed.

The priest's door is set within a taller internal arched recess.

Two other members of the Searle family are commemorated on the lancet window, to the left of the priest's door; Friedrick Searle who died in 1871 and Isabelle Searle who died in 1885.

The design of the lancet on the right of the priest door was based on a painting by William Holman Hunt, Pre-Raffaelite artist (1829–1910), called The Light of the World (1851-4). On the picture Jesus is about to knock on an overgrown and long unopened door that has no door handle. Therefore it can only be opened from the inside. It refers to Revelation 3:20 'Behold, I stand at the door and knock; if any man hear my voice and open the door, I will come in to him, and will sup with him, and he with me.'

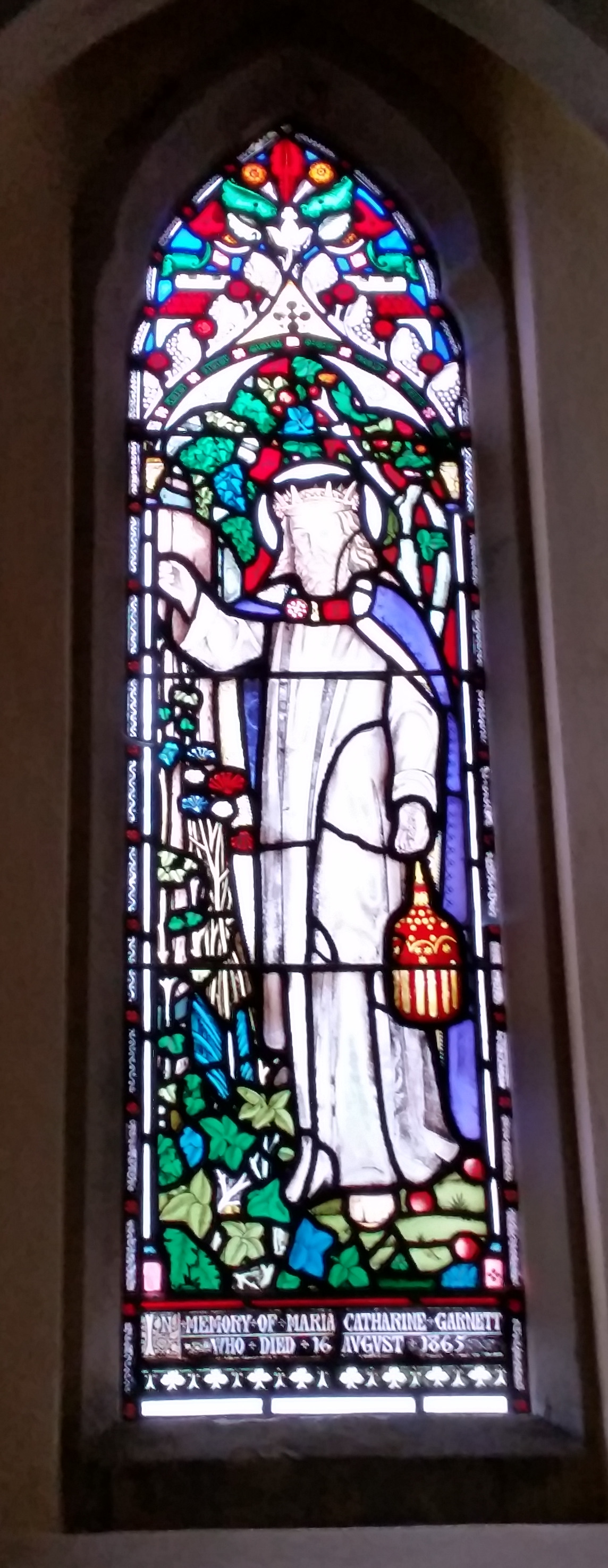
Hunt window

This window is dedicated to the memory of Maria Catharine Garnett who died in 1865.

The piscina and the sedilia were removed from the chancel during restoration in the 19th century.

The brass eagle lectern is a memorial to Mary Ann Reynolds who died in 1913, as inscribed on it.

It holds a large, leather bound Bible with clasp from 1888 that contains Apocrypha. On the clasp, there are the initials W G S, so it probably belonged to Rev William George Searle whom the St Andrew figure of the east window is modelled on.

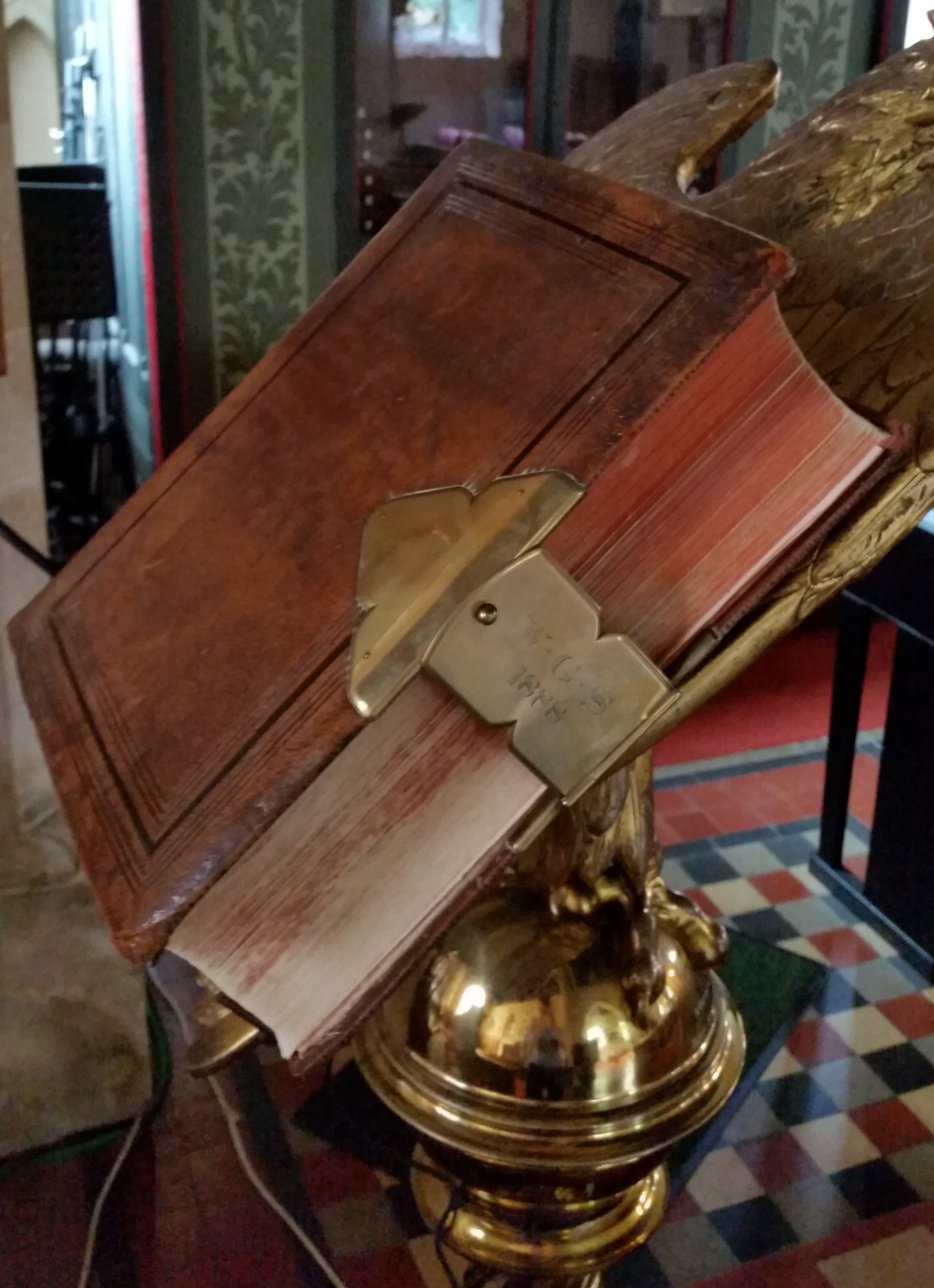
Bible from 1888

A projector screen, fixed in 1984, was replaced by a combined screen and oak hymn board at the south side of the chancel arch, in 2004. This screen is now unused, and a new suspended screen and projector were installed in 2022.

=== East end of the south aisle ===
The organ, built by Miller & Son, Cambridge, was installed in 1891. It was re-painted in 1987, the new decoration was designed by Rosalind Blundell-Jones local resident.

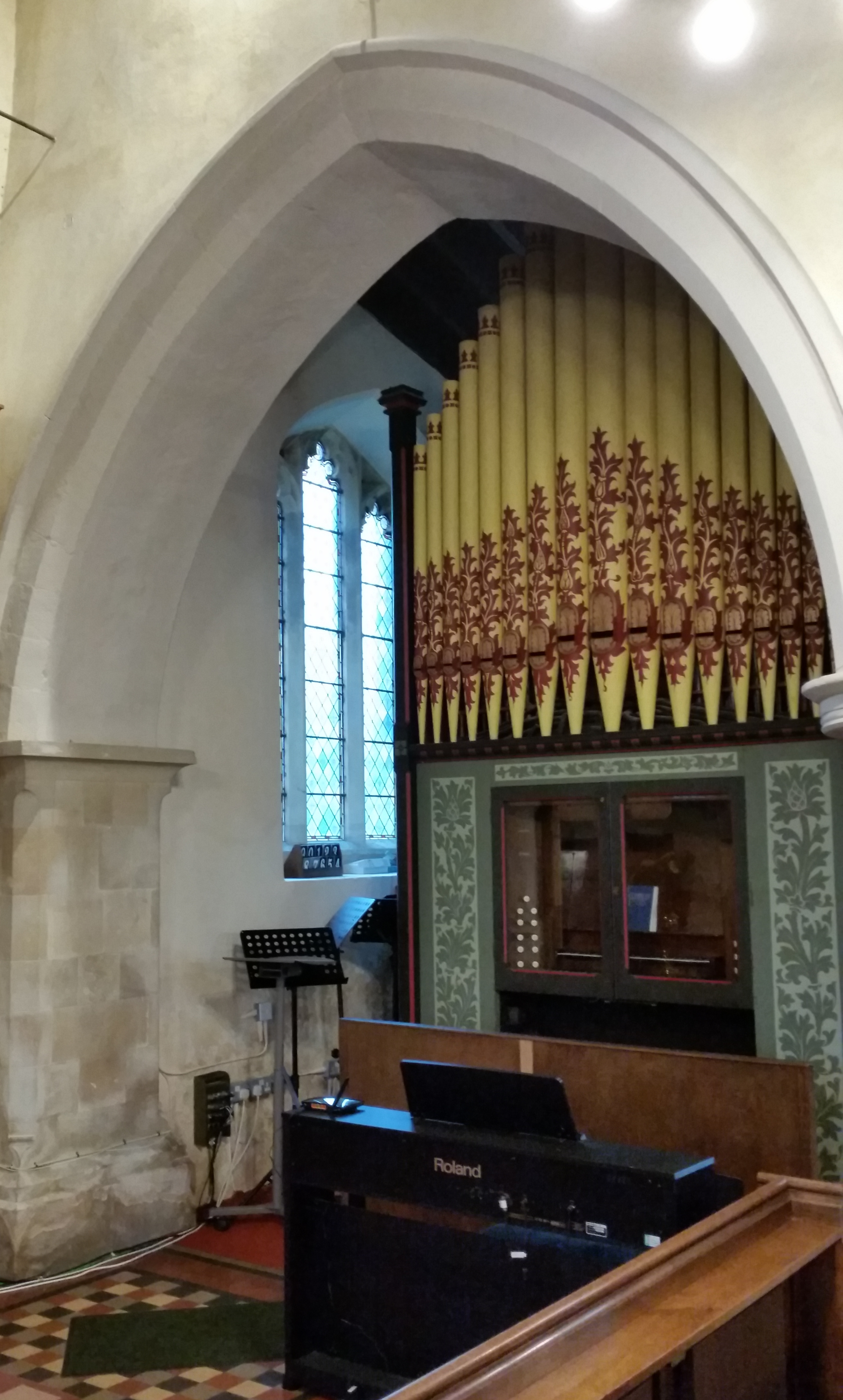
Organ

The swell pedal was applied in 2002, it was donated as a memorial to Rev John Bell's life and ministry by his sister.

Previously, there was a different organ in the chancel.

The keyboard, in front of the organ, has a brass plate on it. It is dedicated to Dulcie Doreen Fordham (1919–2012) and Mitchell William Fordham (1920–2003). Dulcie was a real prayer warrior and the keyboard was purchased with the money she had left to the church.

On the east side of the column closest to the organ, there is a Norman six lobed flower carved.

Next to the organ, at the east end of the south aisle, there is a large Perpendicular window. To the left of the present window, there is a fragment of hood-mould of the 13th century, apparently part of the two-centred arch. It might have belonged to the former east window of a narrow 13th century aisle.

Behind the organ, in the east corner of the south aisle, there is a simple, Early English double piscina.

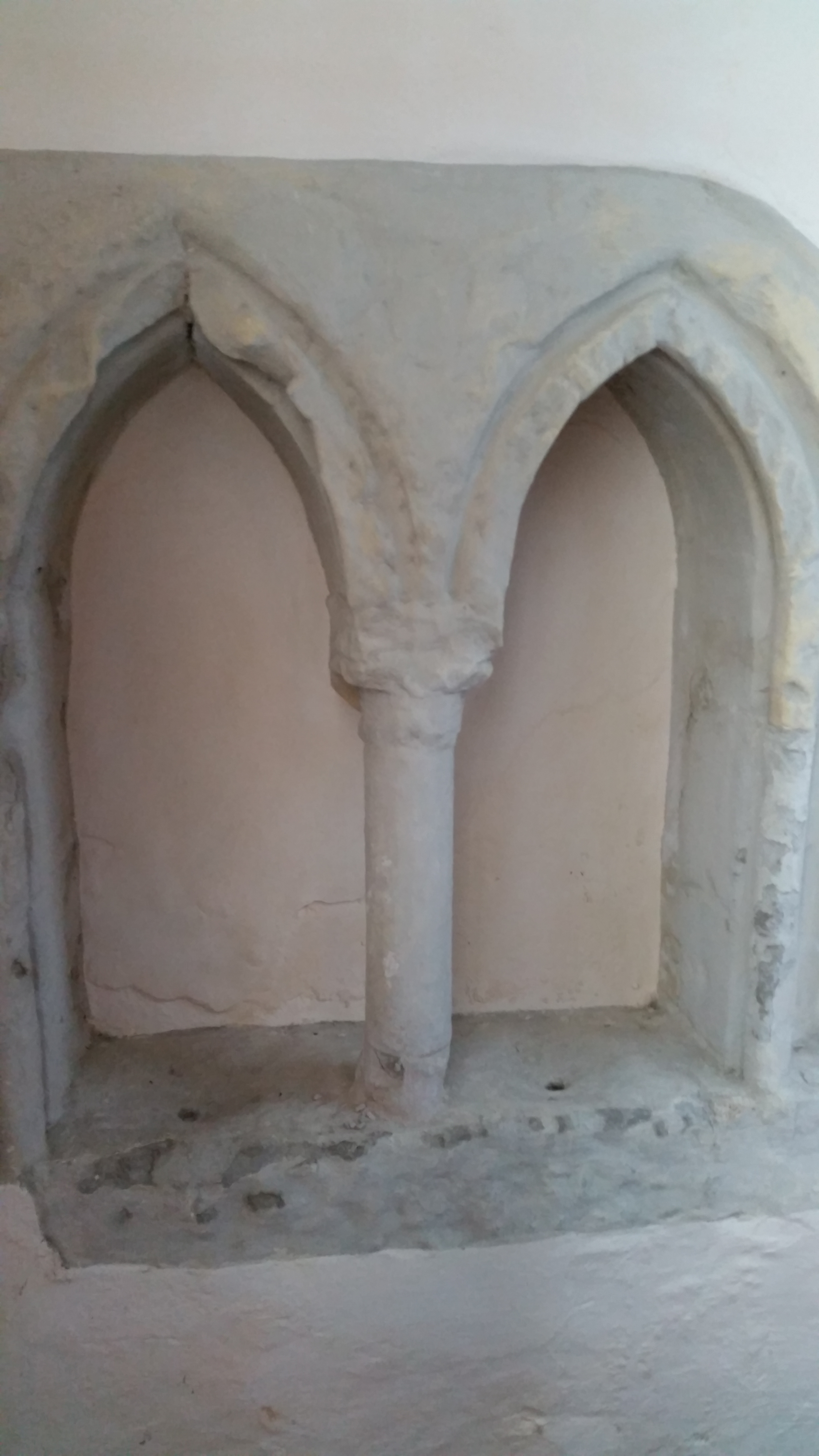
Double piscina

This can be dated to the reign of Edward I (1272–1307), and it would have belonged to the altar in the front of the window whose hood-mould partially remains. It was moved out to its present position in the new south aisle wall in the 14th century when the aisle was widened.

There is a filled-in aumbry adjacent to the piscina.

This chapel, with the double piscina and the large east window, was probably the original Lady Chapel.

There are small glass decorations on the top parts of the foil-headed window behind the organ. This window was refilled with clear glass in 1938, originally it was made of semi-opaque glass with red borders.

The second circular column from the chancel is awaiting repair but remains of the original paintwork can be seen on it.

The window to the east of the lobby, was designed by Reginald Bell in 1938. It has four main pictures and six small ones on individual glass diamonds: two harps, a shepherd's crook, a lily, and a tiny winged child St George defeating the dragon, under the large St George picture on the right side of the window.

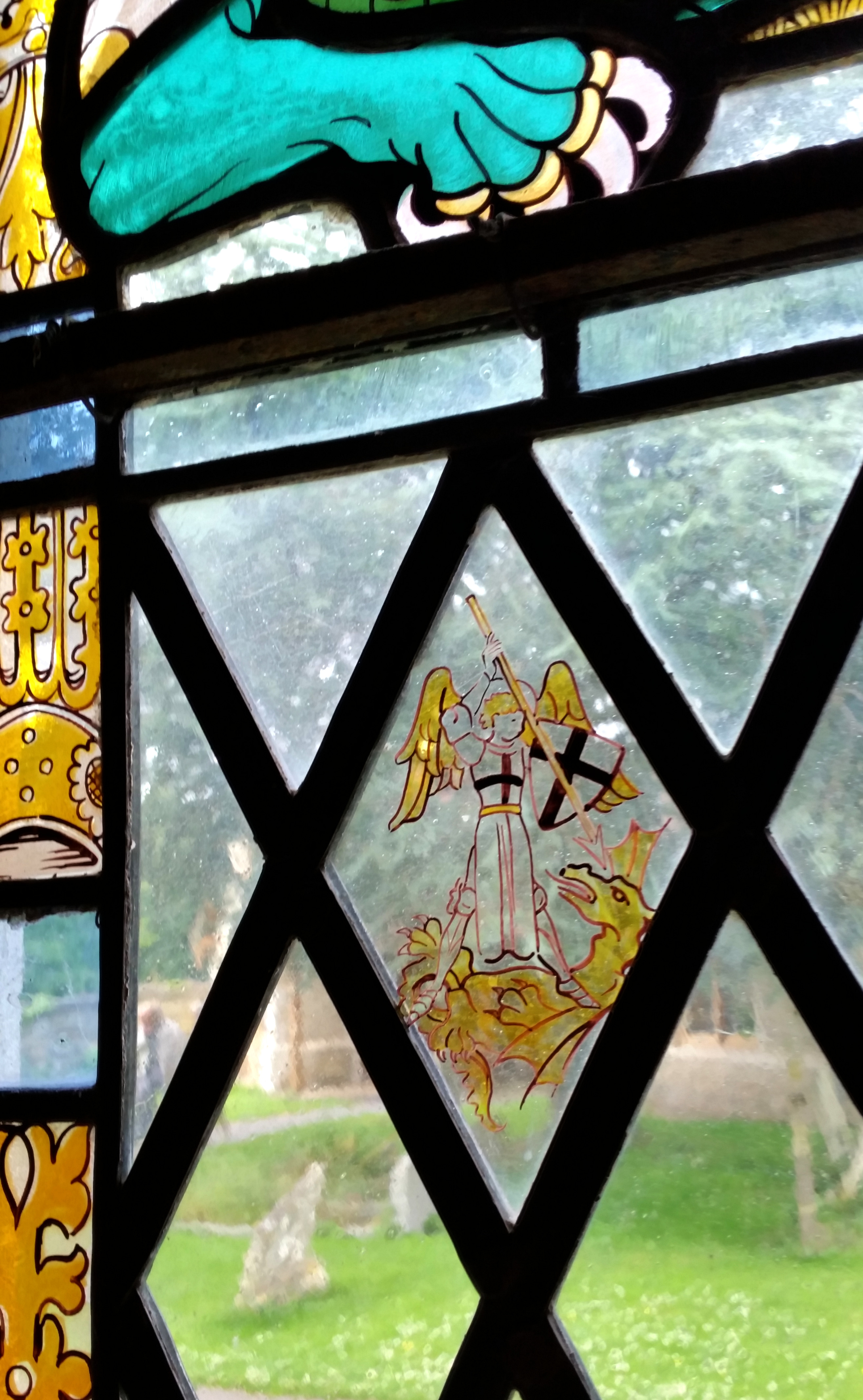
Winged child St George

In the middle, we can see Virgin Mary with baby Jesus. Below them, a panel shows the birth of Jesus. On the left side of the window is King David with his harp. By the hem of his cloak, on the left, a partial inscription reads 'K.Dav'.

Miss Cork of Fen Ditton donated the cost of the window in memory of her parents and sister. The inscription on the window reads 'In thankful remembrance of Isaac and Charlotte Cork of Westwick and their child Hilda'. This window was restored as a memorial to Michael (1920–2002) and Mary Shaw (1922–2001), members of the congregation.

== Bibliography ==
- https://www.oakingtonandwestwick-pc.gov.uk/Local_Information_29385.aspx Retrieved 15 October 2024
- Statement of Significance for the Church Hall Faculty Petition, prepared by St Andrew's Oakington Parochial Council, August 2005
- Listing Document from the Royal Commission on the Historical monuments of England
- Buildings of Cambridgeshire by Nikolaus Pevsner, 1st Ed. 1954 and 2nd Ed. 1970
- Country Churches Cambridge by C H Evelyn White, London, George Allen & Company Ltd., Ruskin House, 1911
- Parish Churches of Cambridgeshire, No. 12. St Andrew's, Oakington by Rev. L Galley, Independent Press and Chronicle, Friday, June 21, 1935
