= Chesterton station =

Chesterton station could refer to:

- Chesterton railway station, a closed station in Chesterton, Cambridge
- Chesterton station (New York Central Railroad), a closed station in Chesterton, Indiana
