= George Searle =

George Searle may refer to:

- George Mary Searle, American astronomer and Catholic priest
- George Frederick Charles Searle, British physicist and teacher
