= Chesterton railway station =

Former railway station in England

Chesterton
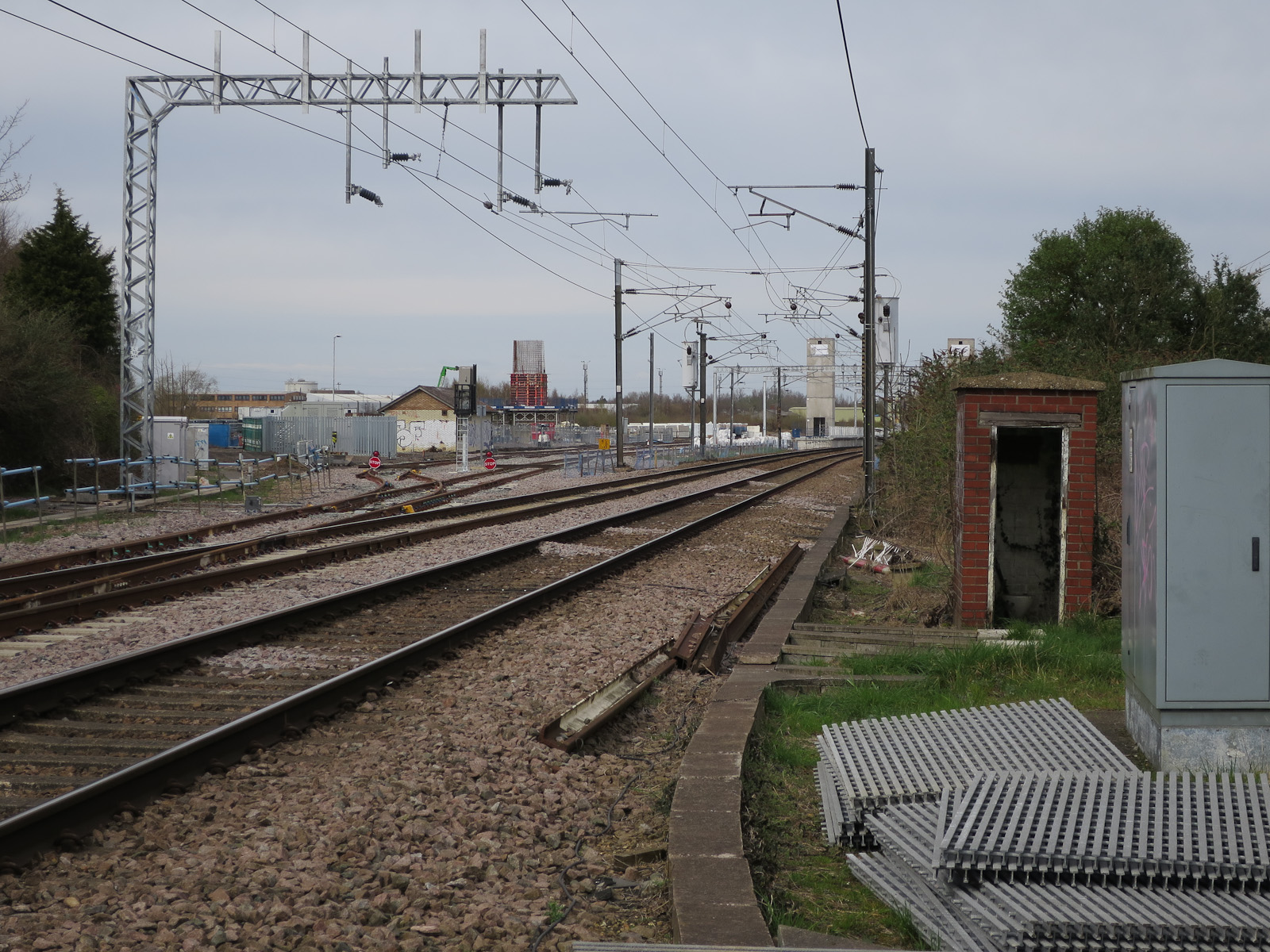
- Station site in 2016.

General information
- Location: Chesterton, Cambridge; England
- Coordinates: 52.222°N 0.1573°E

Other information
- Status: Disused

History
- Original company: Eastern Counties Railway

Key dates
- 19 January 1850: Opened
- October 1850: Closed
Location

Chesterton railway station was located on the line between Cambridge and Histon. It opened in 1850 and closed the same year.

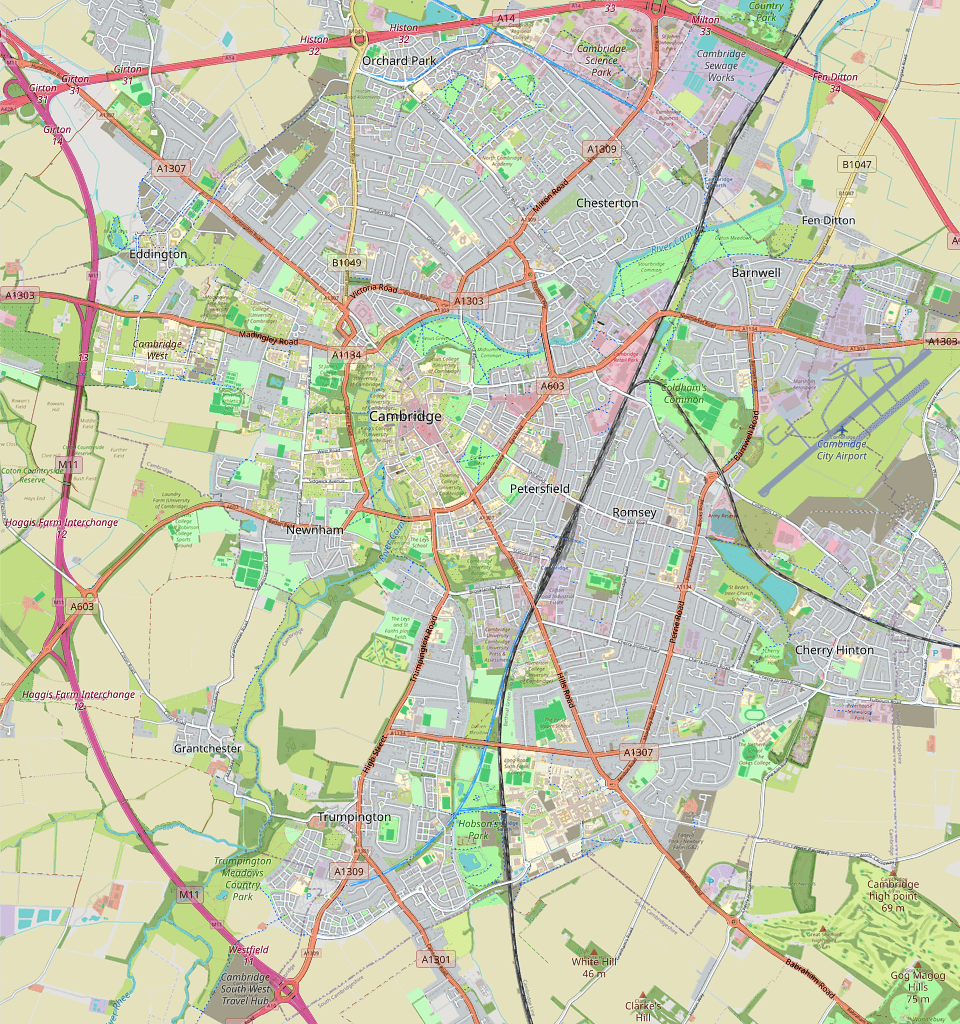
Cambridge railway stations map
(current in bold, closed in italics)

== History ==
In 1846, the Eastern Counties Railway (ECR) obtained authorisation in the Wisbech, St. Ives and Cambridge Junction Railway Act 1846 (9 & 10 Vict. c. ccclvi) to construct the Wisbech, St Ives and Cambridge Junction Railway. The section from St Ives to Chesterton Junction on the King's Lynn to Cambridge line opened on 17 August 1847. The line was originally double-track but was singled by 1854 before being redoubled in the 1870s.

The ECR opened a "flag station" at Chesterton Junction on 19 January 1850. It remained open until October 1850. It was situated on the north side of Fen Road just before the main line crossed the River Cam. A signal box controlling the junction and level crossing over Fen Road stood at the northern end of the bridge until November 1984.

A triangle of land between the St Ives branch and the main line was used at least from 1911 by the permanent way department to store materials and comprised a number of sidings. A modern permanent way depot was built on the site after the Second World War which incorporated a long-welded rails plant and a 2 ft (610 mm) gauge system operated by Ruston and Hornsby diesel mechanical locomotives. By 2005, the depot had been abandoned and the site was heavily overgrown.

Preceding station	Historical railways	Following station
Histon; Line and station closed	Eastern Counties Railway; Wisbech, St Ives and Cambridge Jcn Rly	Cambridge; Line and station open
Waterbeach; Line and station open	Eastern Counties Railway; King's Lynn to Cambridge	Cambridge; Line and station open

== Present day ==
By 2008, the sidings at Chesterton Junction were in use by Lafarge which operated an aggregates storage facility, a concrete batching and coated roadstone plants. In 2015, planning permission was granted for the redevelopment of part of Chesterton Sidings for the construction of Cambridge North railway station, which opened on 21 May 2017. The remainder of the 18-hectare (44-acre) site will become part of a mixed-use development with office, residential and retail space, and involving the relocation of the existing freight facility.
