= Swavesey railway station =

Former railway station in Cambridgeshire, England

Coordinates: 52.3063°N 0.0004°W

Swavesey
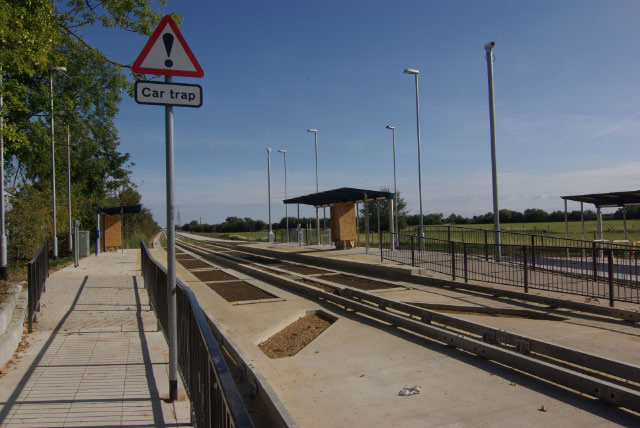
- Swavesey guided bus stop

General information
- Location: Swavesey, Cambridgeshire, Huntingdonshire; England
- Platforms: 2

Other information
- Status: Disused

History
- Pre-grouping: Great Eastern Railway
- Post-grouping: London and North Eastern Railway; British Railways

Key dates
- 19 August 1847: Opened
- 5 October 1970: Closed
Location

Swavesey railway station was a station in Swavesey, Cambridgeshire on the line between Cambridge and St Ives which was closed for passenger services in 1970. The station remained derelict until it was demolished in 2007 for construction of the Cambridgeshire Guided Busway service which utilises the trackbed of the old railway.

Preceding station	Disused railways	Following station
St Ives	Great Eastern Railway; Cambridge & St. Ives Branch	Long Stanton
