= Searle's bar method =

Searle's bar method (named after George Frederick Charles Searle) is an experimental procedure to measure thermal conductivity of material. A bar of material is being heated by steam on one side and the other side cooled down by water while the length of the bar is thermally insulated. Then the heat ΔQ propagating through the bar in a time interval of Δt is given by

$$\left(\frac{\Delta Q}{\Delta t}\right)_\mathrm{bar} = -kA \frac{\Delta T_\mathrm{bar}}{L}$$

where

- ΔQ is the heat supplied to the bar in time Δt
- k is the coefficient of thermal conductivity of the bar.
- A is the cross-sectional area of the bar,
- ΔT_{bar} is the temperature difference between each end of the bar
- L is the length of the bar

and the heat ΔQ absorbed by water in a time interval of Δt is:

$$\left(\frac{\Delta Q}{\Delta t}\right)_\mathrm{water} = C_\mathrm{w}  \frac{\Delta m}{\Delta t} \Delta T_\mathrm{water}$$

where

- C_{w} is the specific heat of water,
- Δm is the mass of water collected during time Δt,
- ΔT_{water} is difference in the temperature of water before and after it has gone through the bar.

Assuming perfect insulation and no energy loss, then

$$\left(\frac{\Delta Q}{\Delta t}\right)_\mathrm{bar} = \left(\frac{\Delta Q}{\Delta t}\right)_\mathrm{water}$$

which leads to

$$k = -C_\mathrm{w} \frac{L}{A} \frac{\Delta m}{\Delta t} \frac{\Delta T_\mathrm{water}}{\Delta T_\mathrm{bar}}$$
