= George Frederick Charles Searle =

British physicist and teacher

- Born: 3 December 1864; Oakington
- Died: 16 December 1954 (aged 90)
- Education: University of Cambridge
- Known for: Electromagnetic mass Searle's bar method
- Spouse: Alice Mary Edwards
- Awards: FRS
- Scientific career
- Workplaces: Cavendish Laboratory

George Frederick Charles Searle FRS (3 December 1864 – 16 December 1954) was a British physicist and teacher. He also raced competitively as a cyclist while at the University of Cambridge.

== Biography ==
Searle was born in Oakington, Cambridgeshire, England. His father was William George Searle.

As a child, he knew Clerk Maxwell, whom he considered to be a humorous individual. In 1888 he began work at the Cavendish Laboratory under J.J. Thomson, and ended up working with the lab for 55 years. After World War II, he ran the undergraduate labs. The equipment he used with Thomson to calibrate the ohm in the 1890s was still being used in the undergraduate lab.

== Contributions to science ==
Searle is known for his work on the velocity dependence of the electromagnetic mass. This was a direct predecessor of Einstein's theory of special relativity, when several people were investigating the change of mass with velocity. Following the work of Oliver Heaviside, he defined the "Heaviside ellipsoid", in which the electrostatic field is contracted in the line of motion. Those developments, when modified, were ultimately important for the development of special relativity.

== Personal life ==
Searle was married to Alice Mary Edwards; they had no children. He contracted a disease at the beginning of World War I and was alleged to have cured himself through spiritual healing. He was a Christian and lay-reader in the Church of England. Searle was a keen cyclist and travelled about proselytizing. He was an opponent of vivisection.

== Selected publications ==
Searle was the author of papers and books, including:

- Experimental Elasticity (1908) Cambridge Univ. Press
- Experimental Harmonic Motion: A Manual for the Laboratory, 1st edition (1915) Cambridge Univ. Press
- Experimental Harmonic Motion, 2nd edition (1922) Cambridge Univ. Press
- Experimental Optics, 1st edition (1925) Cambridge Univ. Press
- Experimental Optics, 2nd edition (1935) Cambridge Univ. Press
- Experimental Physics, (1934) Cambridge Univ. Press
- A Survey of the Case Against Vivisection (1936) Animal Defence and Anti-Vivisection Society
- Oliver Heaviside: The Man (1987) C.A.M. Publishing, England (written in 1950, published posthumously)
