= Chivers and Sons =

Irish brand

The present Chivers logo

Chivers is a brand of jams and preserves. For a large part of the 20th century Chivers and Sons was Britain's leading preserves manufacturer. The brand is currently owned by the Boyne Valley Group who make a range of preserves using the Chivers name.

== Foundation ==
Residents of Cottenham, Cambridgeshire, since the 17th century, the Chivers family moved to Histon in the first years of the 19th century when John Chivers relocated to a house on the Cottenham Road there with his brother (William) and sister, and his three sons Philip, Stephen and Thomas all became market gardeners. Some years later the railway arrived in the village when a station opened to passengers in 1847. Realising the potential opportunities that the railway brought to the village, in 1850 Stephen Chivers (d.1907), son of John, bought an orchard that ran alongside the railway and developed a fruit distribution business, growing to 150 acres (0.61 km^{2}) by 1860. In 1870 Stephen sent his teenage sons William and John to open a distribution centre in Bradford. After a while the sons realised that the majority of their fruit was being purchased by jam manufacturers, and so in 1873, after an exceptional fruit harvest, they convinced their father to let them make their first batch of jam in a barn off Milton Road, Impington.

By 1875 the Victoria Works had been opened next to Histon railway station to improve the manufacture of jam and they produced stone jars containing two, four or six pounds of jam, with glass jars first used in 1885. In around 1885 they had 150 employees.

== Growth ==
Over the next decade they added marmalade to their offering which allowed them to employ year-round staff, rather than seasonal workers at harvest time. This was followed by their clear dessert jelly (1889), and then lemonade, mincemeat, custard powder, and Christmas puddings. By 1896 the family owned 500 acres (2.0 km^{2}) of orchards.

They began selling their products in cans in 1895, and the rapid growth in demand was overseen by Charles Lack (d.1912), their chief engineer, who developed the most efficient canning machinery in Europe and by the end of the century Chivers had become one of the largest manufacturers of preserves in the world. He later added a variety of machines for sorting, can making, vacuum-caps and sterilisation that helped retain Chivers' advantage over its rivals well into the 20th century. By the turn of the century the factory was entirely self-sufficient, growing all its own fruit, and supplying its own water and electricity. The factory made its own cans, but also contained a sawmill, blacksmiths, coopers, carpenters, paint shop, builders and basket makers.

On 14 March 1901 the company was registered as S. Chivers and Sons, and they began to export their products for the first time, by now employing over 1000 people.

Impington Windmill was purchased by Stephen's son, John Chivers (d.1929), in 1904. The factory was renamed the Orchard Factory in around 1910.

The Earl De La Warr sold his lands in the village of Haslingfield to John Chivers, who began planting fruit there for his factory.

== Success ==
By the time John's son Stanley Chivers took over the company after the First World War they had become an integrated farming operation to supply the factory; the Chivers family regarded themselves as farmers, with the factories as a secondary enterprise. Plums and other soft fruit were grown for jam and canned fruit and formed the bulk of the farmland, but pedigree cows and pigs were raised and corn grown to make manure, with silage and hay for winter animal feed. Poultry were kept in the orchards to manure the land, fed on their own wheat, with eggs used to make lemon curd in the factory. Percheron horses were added to pull carts and ploughs, but the family were also early users of tractors. When the value of corn fell in the 1920s, grass was grown instead, and sheep farmed to prepare the land for later use as orchards.

By 1939 there were over 3,000 full-time employees, with offices in East Anglia as well as additional factories in Montrose, Newry and Huntingdon, and the company owned almost 8,000 acres (32 km^{2}) of farms. The company's farms were each run independently, and grew cereal and raised pedigree livestock as well as the fruit for which they were known.

The Histon factory and its 2,200 employees were of added importance during the Second World War when they began to produce blackcurrant purée, following vitamin C research conducted by Mamie Olliver in the firm's microbiological laboratory in the 1930s.

By 1947 their top-selling range of jams, jellies and "Olde English Marmalade" was produced alongside baking powder, ground coffee, vegetables, apple juice, mincemeat, honey, jelly crystals, and curt. They held the patent for the replaceable metal lid to their glass jam jars.

The Chivers family were known as generous employers; a pioneering profit-sharing scheme was introduced in 1891, with a factory nurse, surgery and canteens all added in the first years of the 20th century. Contributory pensions followed in 1933, and the company had minimal trade union involvement and no major industrial disputes until they were acquired in 1959.

== Sale and closure ==
Sales fell after 1945 causing Chivers to lose their market leadership, and their failure to update their factory with more recent advances in machinery led to further decline. In 1959, when employee numbers had fallen to only 1500, the farms and factories were sold to the Swiss drinks company Schweppes, with the factories becoming part of Cadbury Schweppes when the drinks company were themselves acquired. In 1961 the Chivers family bought the majority of the farms that they had sold to Schweppes only two years previously.

The 1980s saw an end to the old factory. In a 1986 management buyout the site was sold to developers and a new five million pound factory was built at the rear of the property by new owners Premier Foods for the production of Sun-Pat peanut butter and Smash instant mashed potatoes, Gale's honey as well as Hartley's jam. The old factory was demolished and the land used to build Vision Park, a business park.

In 2004 Premier Foods announced that it would no longer be using the Chivers name on its products, instead remarketing their jam and marmalade using the Hartley's brand, which continued to be made in Histon and employing nearly 400 people. In 2007, Premier Foods would close down the Coolock factory leading to the loss of 100 jobs. The factory is now lying derelict. In 2011 Premier Foods sold the Chivers brand to the Boyne Valley Group as part of a £40m sale, and in 2012 Premier sold the Hartley's brand and the Histon factory as part of a £200m deal with Hain Celestial.
