= St Ives railway station (Cambridgeshire) =

Former railway station in Cambridgeshire, England

Coordinates: 52.3208°N 0.0671°W

St Ives

General information
- Location: St Ives, Huntingdonshire; England
- Platforms: 3

Other information
- Status: Disused

History
- Pre-grouping: Great Eastern Railway
- Post-grouping: London and North Eastern Railway; British Railways

Key dates
- 19 August 1847: Opened
- 5 October 1970: Closed
Location

St Ives railway station is a former railway station in St Ives, Cambridgeshire. It formed a junction, with lines to the east heading towards Cambridge, north towards Ely and March and west towards Godmanchester. It opened on 19 August 1847, closed on 5 October 1970, and was demolished in 1977. The site is now occupied by the St. Ives "Park and Ride" area.

Preceding station	Disused railways	Following station
Godmanchester	Great Eastern Railway; Cambridge & St. Ives Branch	Swavesey
Bluntisham	Great Eastern Railway; Ely and St Ives Railway	Swavesey
Somersham	Great Eastern Railway; March Branch	Swavesey
