= William George Searle =

British historian

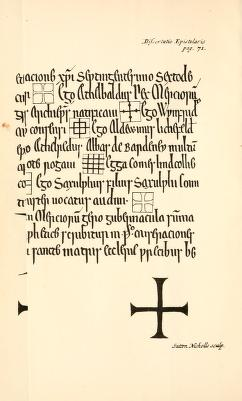
The facsimile frontispiece of Ingulf, 1894

William George Searle (1829–1913) was a 19th-century British historian and a fellow of Queens' College, Cambridge.

His works include Ingulf and the Historia Croylandensis, Onomasticon Anglo-Saxonicum: A List of Anglo-Saxon Proper Names from the Time of Beda to that of King John and Anglo-Saxon Bishops, Kings and Nobles. He also published a history of Queens' College.

He was the father of the physicist George Frederick Charles Searle.
