= Oakington =

Village in Cambridgeshire, England

Coordinates: 52°15′40″N 0°04′04″E

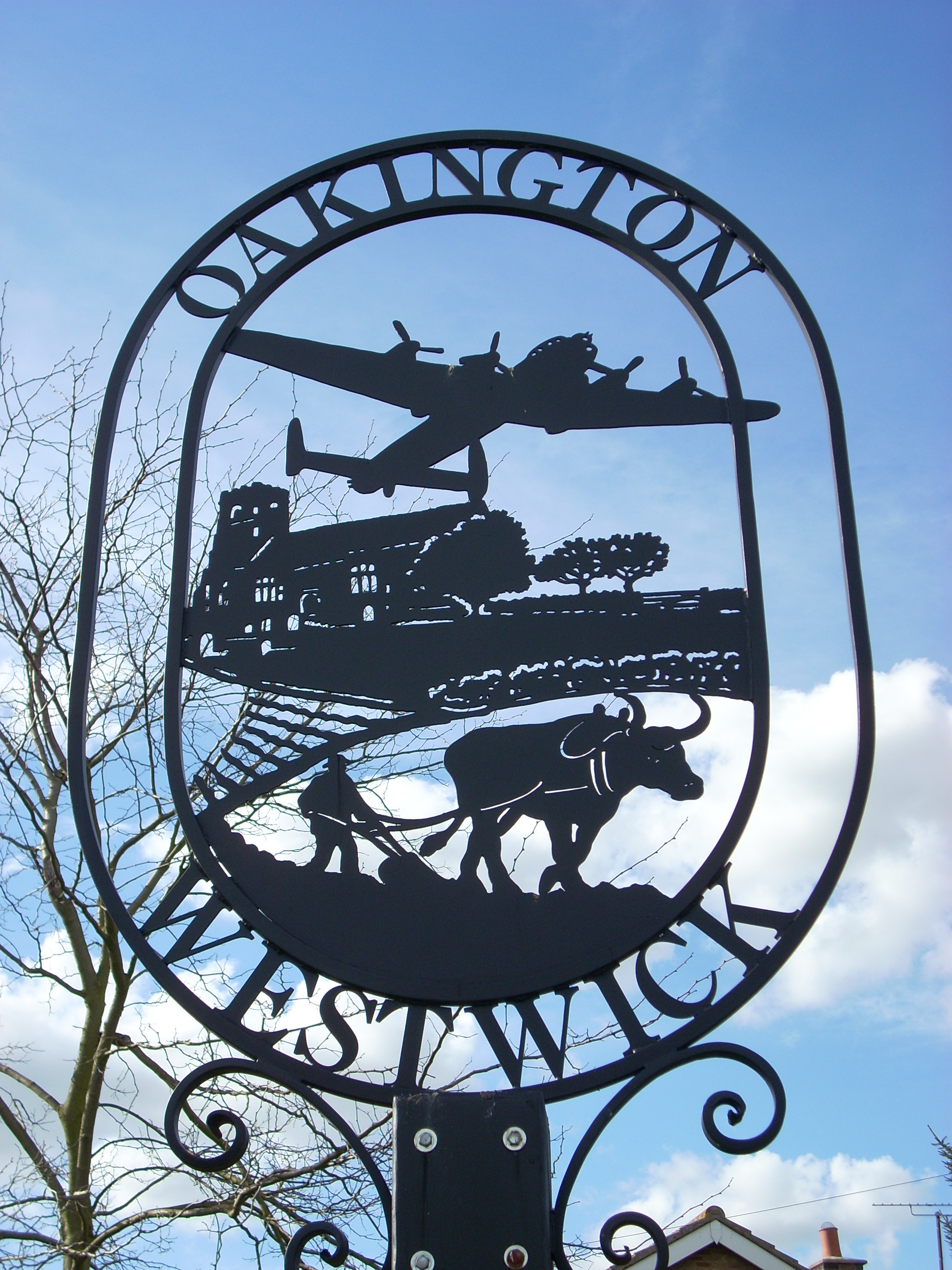

- Location within Cambridgeshire
- Population: 1,297 (2001); 1,597 (2011)
- OS grid reference: TL412645
- Civil parish: Oakington and Westwick
- District: South Cambridgeshire
- Shire county: Cambridgeshire
- Region: East
- Country: England
- Sovereign state: United Kingdom
- Post town: CAMBRIDGE
- Postcode district: CB24
- Dialling code: 01223
- Police: Cambridgeshire
- Fire: Cambridgeshire
- Ambulance: East of England
- UK Parliament: South Cambridgeshire

Oakington is a small rural village and former civil parish, now in the parish of Oakington and Westwick, in the South Cambridgeshire district, in the county of Cambridgeshire, England, dating back to Roman times. It is seven miles (11 km) north-west of Cambridge. In 1961 the parish had a population of 698.

== History ==
Based on the finds of several hand axes in the area it is believed that there may have been a settlement in the Oakington area during the Palaeolithic era, and given the quantity of Roman pottery shards found in gardens and fields, it appears almost certain that the village was settled from the 2nd to the 4th century AD.

In 1938, an early Anglo-Saxon graveyard was discovered on what is now the Queens Way recreation ground (south east of Water Lane, and on land surrounded by fields containing visible evidence of Medieval settlement). Excavations on the site in 1993 revealed evidence of 25 burials and a cremation. In 2012 further excavation of this Anglo-Saxon cemetery led to the discovery of the remains of a woman buried with a cow.

Oakington was quite a large village in the Middle Ages with 55 residents counted in the Domesday Book and 100 by 1279. Listed as Hochinton in the Domesday Book of 1086, the name "Oakington" means "estate of a man called Hocca".

The Black Death decimated the population in the 14th century wiping out half the tenants of the largest manor. By the 17th century there were around 180 residents and the population steadily grew until the early 19th century when it began to rise rapidly, reaching a peak population of 610 in 1851. However, poverty and unemployment then took its toll with up to a third of the villagers leaving (some for Adelaide, Australia). The population stabilised at circa 425 by the 1890s and by 1950 there were around 500 inhabitants. Today the combined settlements of Oakington and Westwick have about 1,400 residents.

In the 17th century, Oakington was considered to be a "hot-bed of religious dissent" leading the Bishop, in 1685, to describe it as "the most scandalous and vile parish in his Diocese". Behind the churchyard, there is a private burial ground containing the graves of three vicars. The Reverends Francis Holcroft and Joseph Oddy were 17th-century pioneers of the non-conformist movement, and known as the 'Apostles of Cambridgeshire'. It was by their zeal that various non-conformist churches were established in Cambridgeshire. Ejected from their livings, persecuted and imprisoned for propagating their faith during their lives they became known as the 'Oakington Martyrs' in death. Along with their successor, the Reverend Henry Osland, the site of their graves is preserved today as a memorial to non-conformist Protestantism.

In 1847 the railway reached the parish, with the Oakington railway station opening in 1848. The line was finally closed in 1970, but is now used by the Cambridge to St Ives guided bus and cycleway. Next to the track, the 150-year-old bridge over Beck Brook was completely rebuilt in 2006.

In 1909 two Oakington residents, Messrs Grose and Feary, built a monoplane in an attempt to win the Daily Mail prize for £1,000 for the first Briton to fly a circular mile in an all-British aeroplane.

From 1940 a Royal Air Force bomber airfield, RAF Oakington, was constructed at Oakington covering 540 acres (220 ha) and served as a station for Short Stirling bomber forces and reconnaissance planes. In the post war period it was used for flight training, in the last period with Vickers Varsity aircraft. The airfield contracted after the war and much evidence of its former presence is visible in farmland surrounding the current perimeter. When the need for training on piston-engined aircraft reduced, it was converted to a barracks in 1975, which closed in 1999. The site was then leased to the Home Office and was converted into Oakington Immigration Reception Centre, an immigration detention centre.

On 1 April 1985 the parish was abolished and "Oakington and Westwick" was formed.

The site of the barracks will form part of the new town of Northstowe, which began development in 2015. Northstowe became a civil parish in April 2021, with Oakington & Westwick transferring some of its land, along with Longstanton, to allow its formation.

== Geography ==
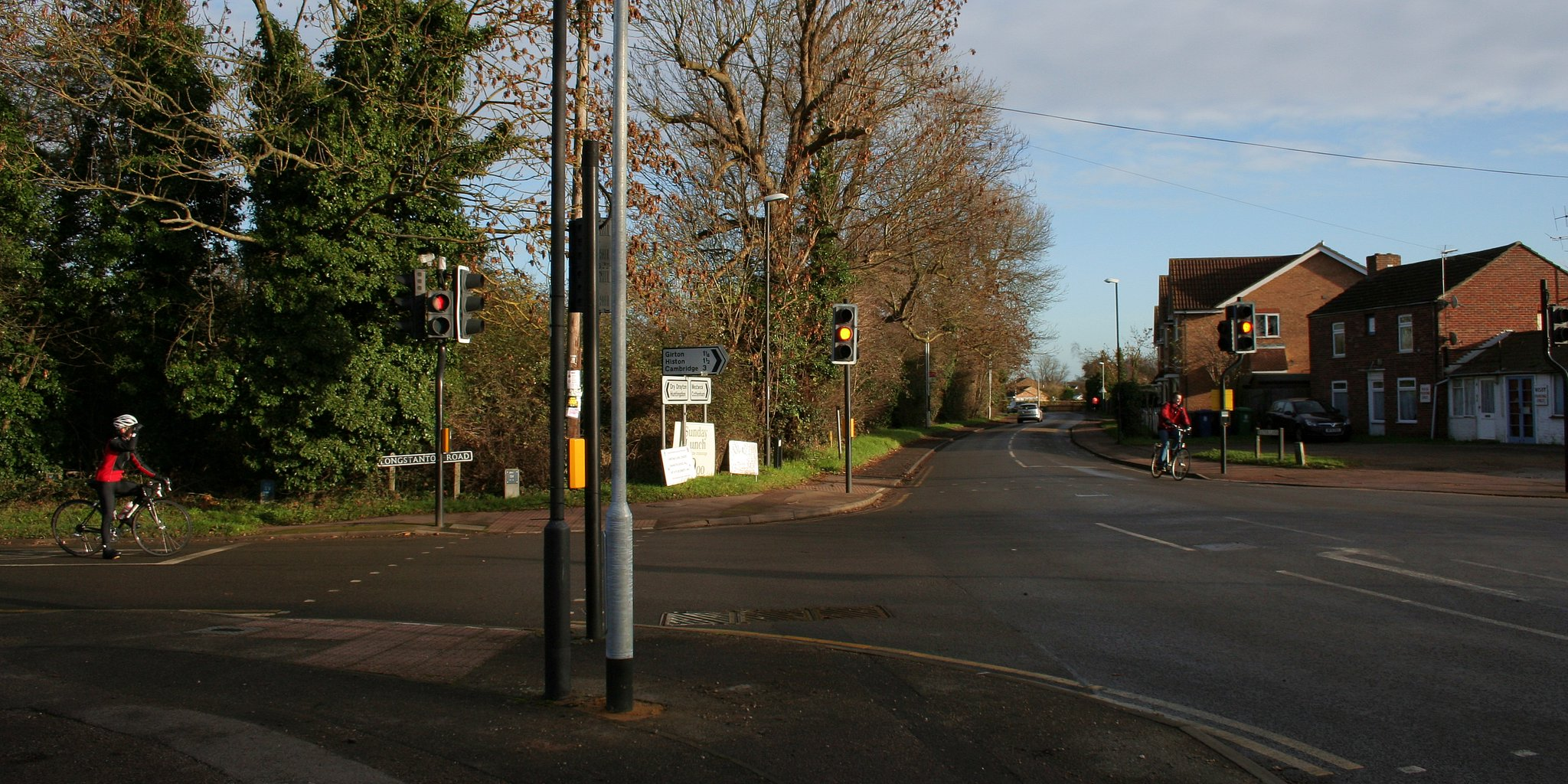
Village crossroads viewed from the southwest

Oakington is located on a low lying ridge just over a mile to the north east of the former Roman road Via Devana (now the A14) where it joins the M11 and is five miles (8 km) from Cambridge. The ancient parish of Oakington covered 1,692 acres (685 ha) with the Via Devana forming its south-western boundary with Dry Drayton. The Beck Brook separated it from Westwick to the north and Histon to the east, and field boundaries divided it from Longstanton to the north-west, and Girton to the south.

The village is connected by two main roads, one runs (southeast-northwest) from Girton and Histon to Longstanton, crossed by the second which runs (northeast-southwest) road from Cottenham to Dry Drayton. Since the war, the road to Longstanton has been closed to vehicular through-traffic.

Between Oakington and the nearby hamlet of Westwick runs the former railway branch line, with the former station that is now part of the Cambridge to St Ives guided bus and cycle track.

== Amenities ==
Oakington has only one pub, the White Horse on Alehouse Green, which was first recorded in the 1760s. It was rebuilt in 1805 after a fire. In Westwick, the New Inn opened near the former station in 1858 and closed in 1980. Small businesses in the area include a garden centre and a village stores, and there are two small business units in the western part of Oakington and in the eastern part of Westwick.

A recreation field with a pavilion hosts sports fixtures and village events, and there are two recreational green spaces on the east side of the village - Mansell Wood and Centenary Wood.

Oakington Primary School, which caters for 5–11 year old children, opened in 1900. It has been rated as Good in its latest Ofsted report and is run as an academy by the Diocese of Ely Multi-academy trust. The school is a feeder to Impington Village College.

== Churches ==
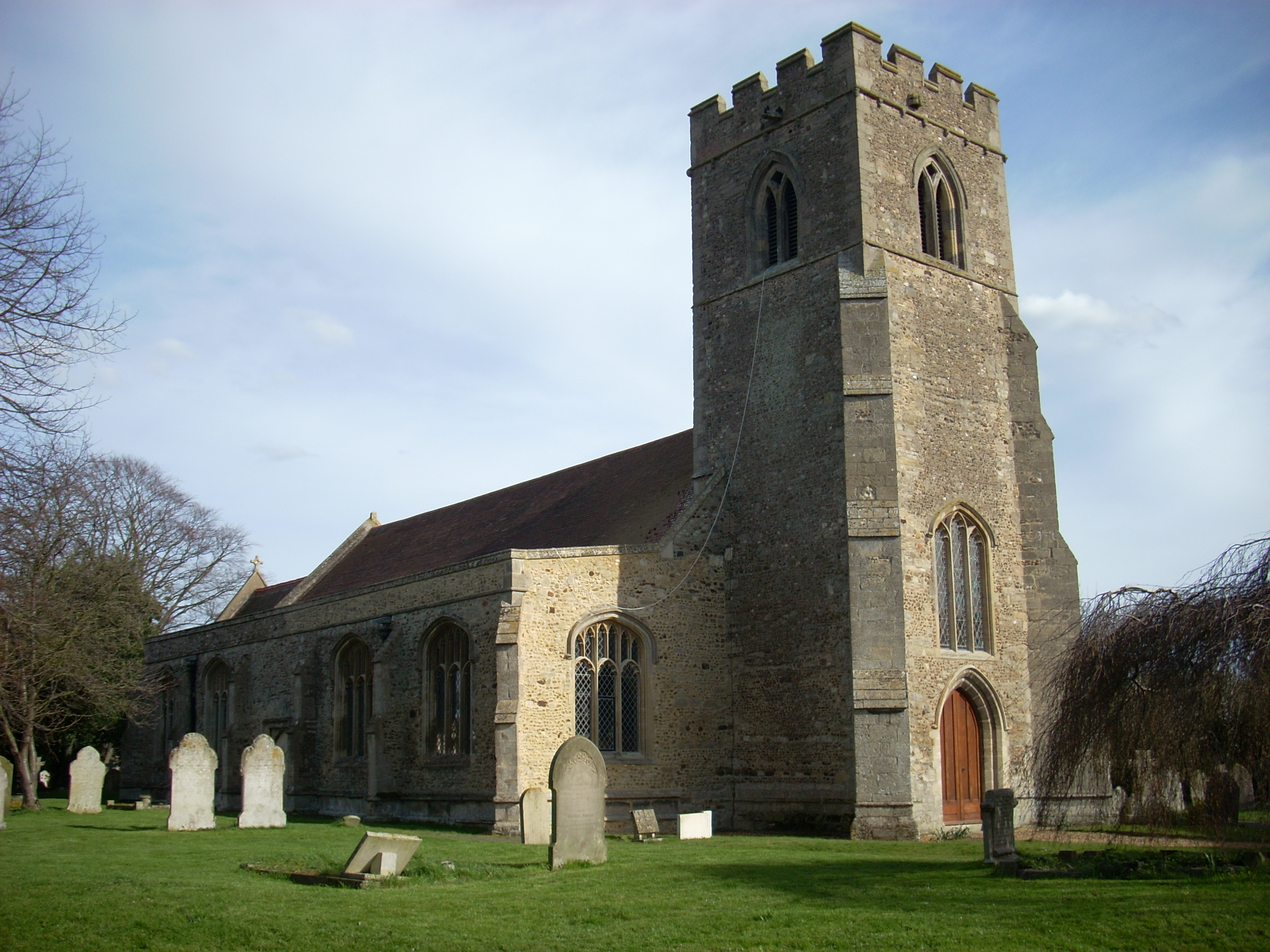
St Andrew's church

Oakington has long been paired with neighbouring Westwick, the latter having relied upon Oakington for a parish church since the 13th century. In 1985 the two parishes were merged to form the civil parish of Oakington and Westwick, and now covers 1,862 acres (754 ha).

The parish church of St Andrew is the tallest building in the village and comprises a chancel, aisled nave with rebuilt south porch, and west tower. Parts of the nave date back to the 12th century, and the church was substantially rebuilt in the 13th century. A church hall was built in the 21st century. The church is an evangelical congregation, part of the Church of England, and the current vicar is the Rev. James Alexander.

Oakington also has a Baptist church. Its Methodist church was closed in 2014.

== See also ==
- List of places in Cambridgeshire

== Bibliography ==
- Hamlin, John F. Oakington (Airfield Focus No. 10). Bretton, Peterborough, United Kingdom: GMS Enterprises, 1991. ISBN 1-870384-23-7.
