= Oakington railway station =

Former railway station in Cambridgeshire, England

Coordinates: 52.2659°N 0.0769°E

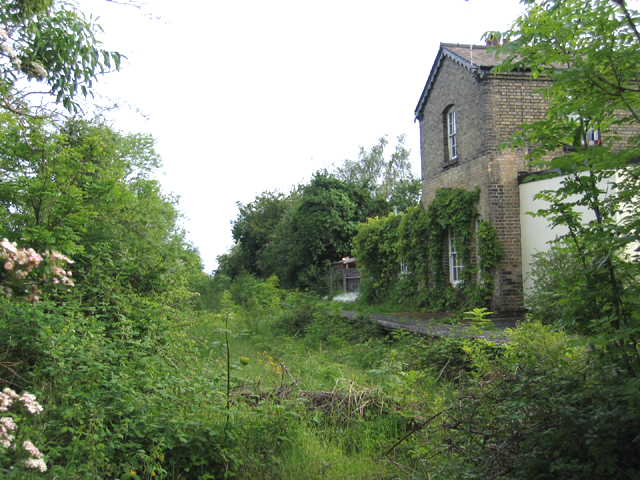
Oakington in 2006.

Oakington railway station was a station in Oakington, Cambridgeshire, on the line between Cambridge and St Ives. It opened on 17 August 1847 and was closed during the Beeching Axe on 5 October 1970. The station building remains as a private house but the track has been replaced by the Cambridgeshire Guided Busway.

Preceding station	Disused railways	Following station
Long Stanton	Great Eastern Railway	Histon
