= Long Stanton railway station =

Former railway station in Cambridgeshire, England

Coordinates: 52.2932°N 0.0496°E

Long Stanton
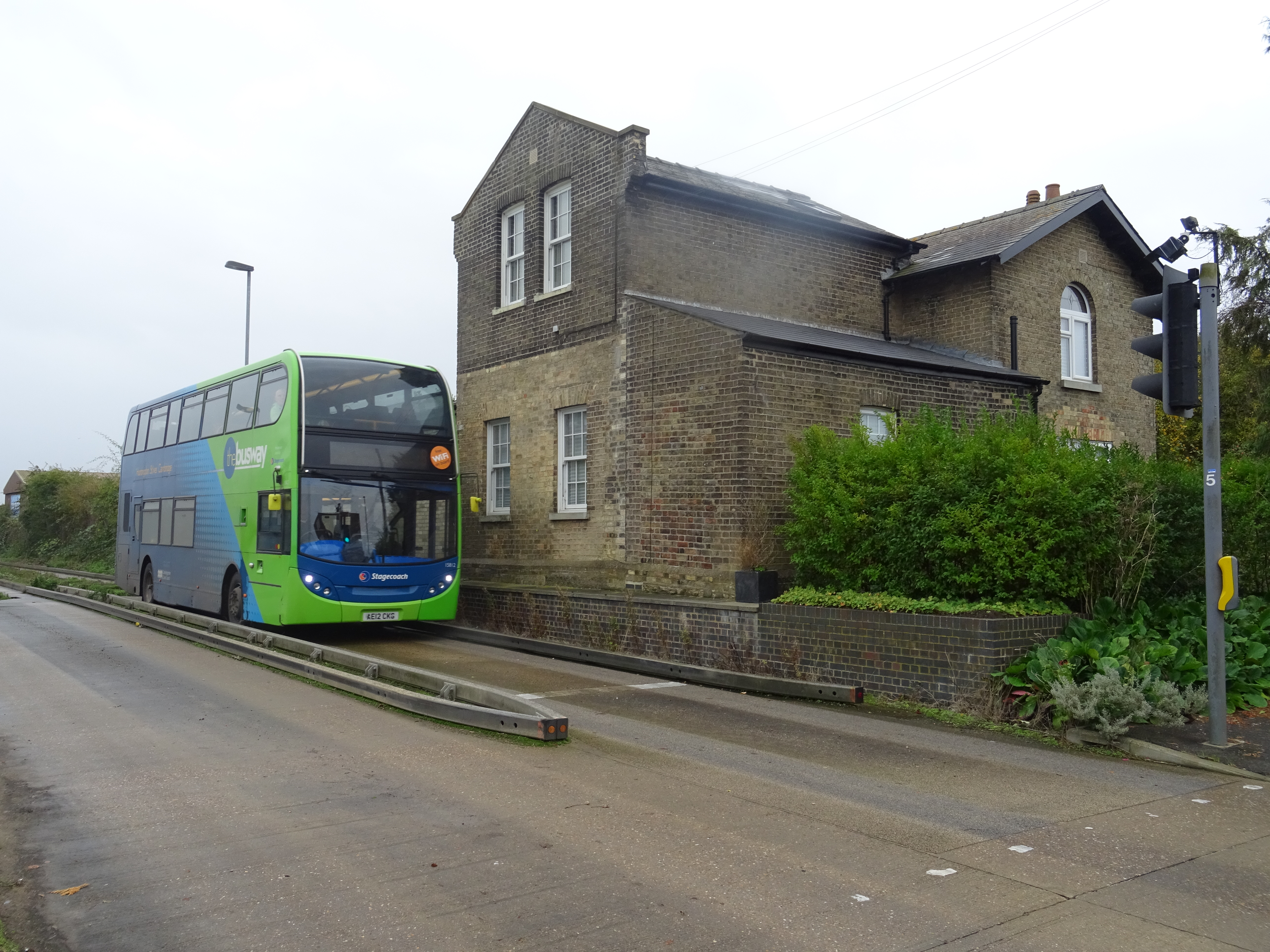
- Long Stanton station building, with a bus travelling on the guided busway, October 2019

General information
- Location: Cambridgeshire, Huntingdonshire; England
- Platforms: 2

Other information
- Status: Disused

History
- Pre-grouping: Great Eastern Railway
- Post-grouping: London and North Eastern Railway; British Railways

Key dates
- 19 August 1847: Opened
- 5 October 1970: Closed
Location

Long Stanton railway station was a station on the Great Eastern Railway, between Cambridge and Huntingdon. It served the villages of Longstanton and Willingham (being roughly midway between them), until closure in October 1970. The station was immortalised in 1964 in the song "Slow Train" by Flanders and Swann.

The railway line through Long Stanton remained open for freight trains from Cambridge to St Ives, Cambridgeshire, until 1992. The track was removed and one platform demolished in 2007, due to construction of the Cambridgeshire Guided Busway; however, the station building remains in private ownership. Parts from the platforms were preserved for re-use on the Mid-Norfolk Railway.

Preceding station	Disused railways	Following station
Swavesey	Great Eastern Railway	Oakington
