= Histon railway station =

Former railway station in Cambridgeshire, England

Histon
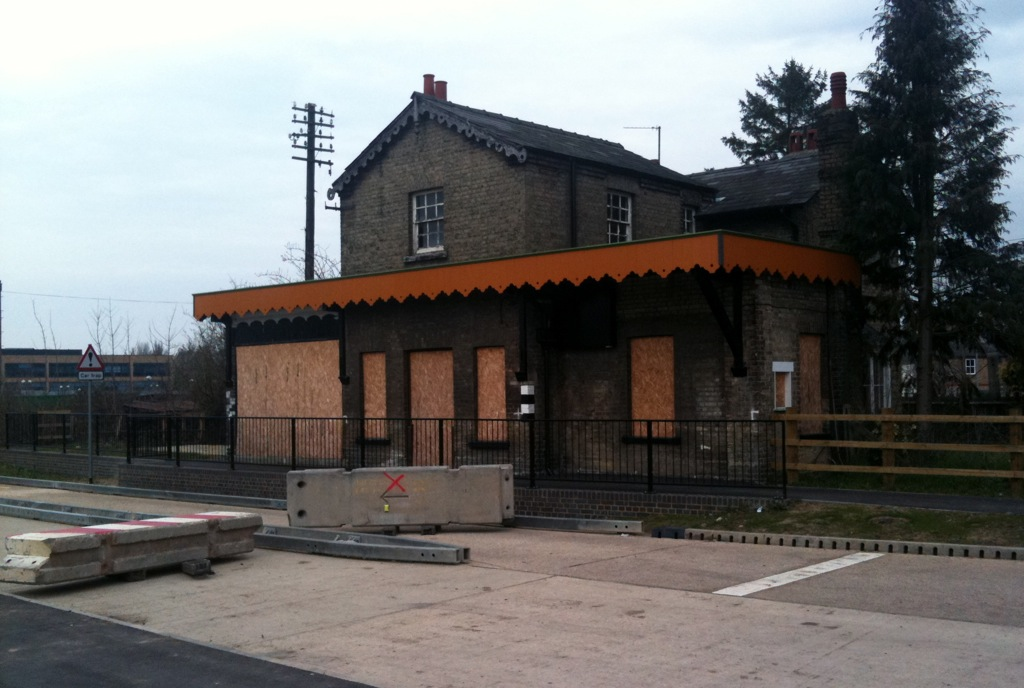
- Histon railway station, circa 2010

General information
- Location: Histon, South Cambridgeshire; England
- Coordinates: 52.2423°N 0.1103°E
- Platforms: 2

Other information
- Status: Disused

History
- Pre-grouping: Great Eastern Railway
- Post-grouping: London and North Eastern Railway; British Railways

Key dates
- 17 August 1847: Opened
- 5 October 1970: Closed
Location

Histon railway station is a disused railway station in Impington, Cambridgeshire on the Cambridge–St Ives branch of the Great Eastern Railway. The station was closed as part of the Beeching Axe in 1970; but the line through the station remained open for freight trains until 1992. The station site was partially demolished, with the platforms and a small building on the down side being removed and the canopy severely truncated during the construction of the Cambridgeshire Guided Busway but the station building was saved from being demolished; a car park was planned to be built on the site of the demolished station building. The building has operated as a cafe since 2021.

== Gallery ==
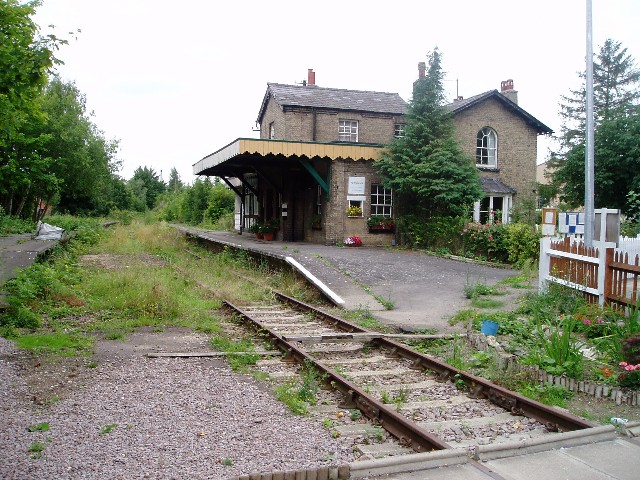
Histon railway station in 2005

== References and notes ==
Preceding station	Disused railways	Following station
Oakington	Great Eastern Railway; Cambridge & St. Ives Branch	Cambridge
