= King's Hedges =

Electoral ward in Cambridge, England

Coordinates: 52.22889°N 0.13312°E

- Location within Cambridgeshire
- OS grid reference: TL457611
- Shire county: Cambridgeshire
- Region: East
- Country: England
- Sovereign state: United Kingdom
- Post town: CAMBRIDGE
- Postcode district: CB4
- Dialling code: 01223
- Police: Cambridgeshire
- Fire: Cambridgeshire
- Ambulance: East of England
- UK Parliament: Cambridge

King's Hedges is an electoral ward in Cambridge, England. As of the 2021 UK census, the ward had a population of 11,099 people.

== History ==
King's Hedges was originally a fifty eight acre farm, to the north of what is now the Cambridgeshire Guided Busway. The site was bounded by the Roman road, Akeman Street (Cambridgeshire), and Impington Park to the west, and the Rectory (later Trinity Farm) to the east. The site is now occupied by the Cambridge Regional College, a stretch of the A14 motorway, and a small quadrant of land west of the motorway. Most of King's Hedges Road dates from the late 1970s. It was originally a farm track, leading from Chesterton to the original property, but with the development of the motorway the road was extended and redirected across the land by Arbury Camp Farm, and replaced the original junction of Arbury Road and the Cambridge/Histon Road.

The name 'Kinges Headge' was first recorded in 1558, the property of Richard Brakyn. The name is believed to have been derived from the fact that it is on the site of the medieval King's warren, or game preserve, where hedges were grown to chase the animals into areas where the hunters could easily catch or kill them.

According to one known source (independent research - a 1980s Cambridgeshire Collection submission) which has since been widely quoted in the Victoria Histories, British History Online and by Cambridge City Council, 34 acres of the King's Hedges site were known as Albrach from as early as the 13th century.

Historical sources for the 'Albrach' name were sought by local historians for over two years, via maps and deeds - unsuccessfully. The name does not match 13th Century etymology and it is now thought was a misreading of one of the Arbury name variations, or the Arbury name itself. Several of the fields north of the original Arbury Road carried the Harborough name, one of the variations, in the 1840 Chesterton Enclosures map, and earlier newspaper reports refer to Arbury Meadows and Arbury Hedges. The Manor Farm, which was established north of Arbury Road in the years following the enclosures, contained two large adjacent fields called 'Arbury' and 'Arbury Field'.

== Development ==
Development of the King's Hedges estate to the north west of Campkin Road began in 1967, and by 1986 a total of 1570 households had been built on the 125-acre site, largely in blocks of three and four storeys, and reaching the city limits. These council estates were occupied predominantly by families removed from older parts of the city, and there were initially numerous complaints of vandalism and about the lack of community facilities.

In 2005 the adjacent Orchard Park – previously known as Arbury Park – was begun. Cambridgeshire Guided Busway, opened in 2011, now runs along the edge of the King's Hedges ward.

== Local life ==
The ward has primary schools – King's Hedges Primary School (built 1967–1969) and The Grove Primary School (1963) and two public houses (The Ship and Golden Hind).

The area has bus and road connections to the centre of Cambridge as well as ready access to the outskirts and the A14 trunk road. It is home to the Cambridge Regional College further education college, as well as a number of local pubs and shops, and the Cambridge Science Park is adjacent to the ward.

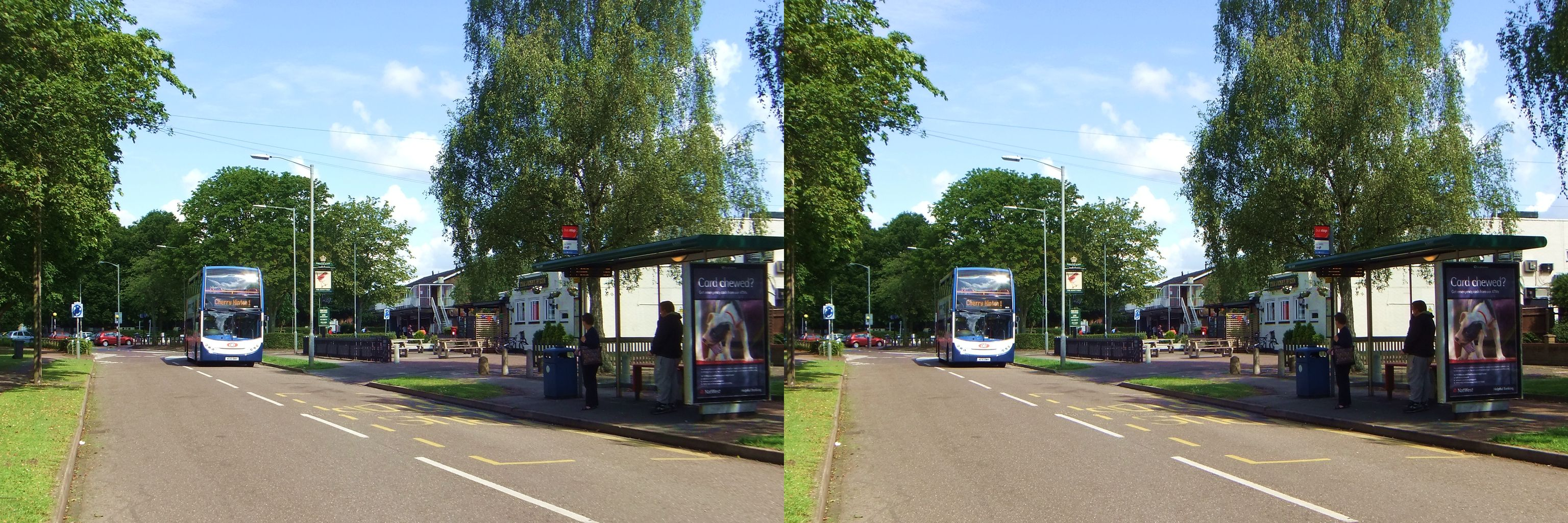
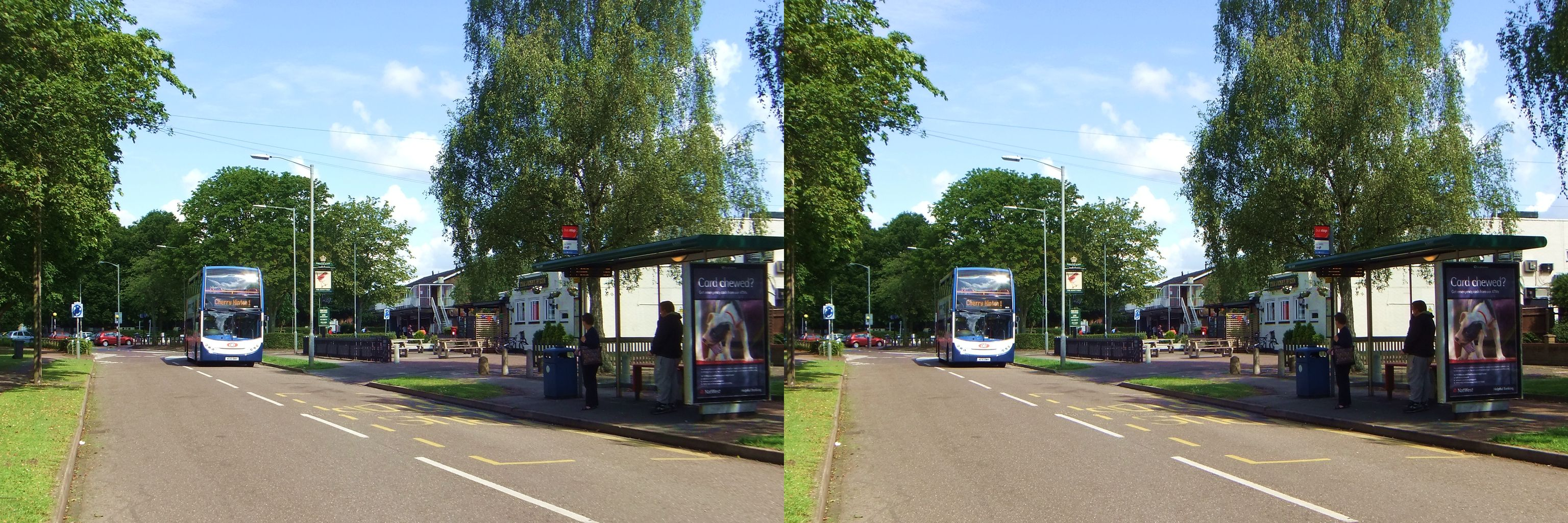
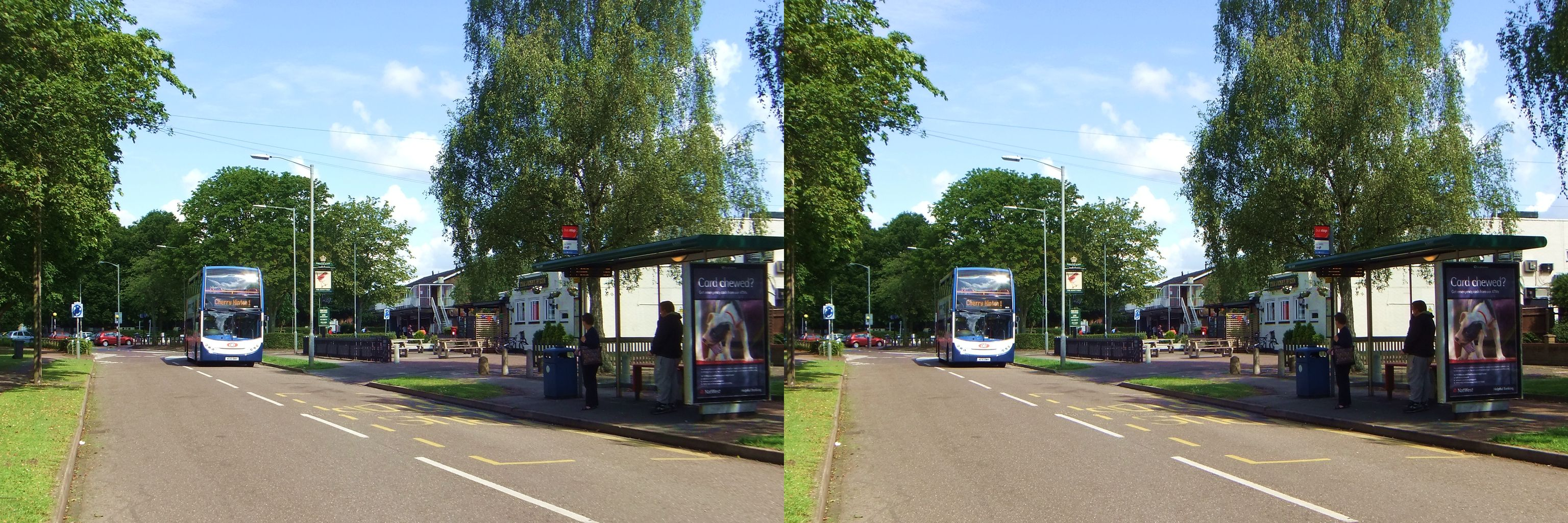
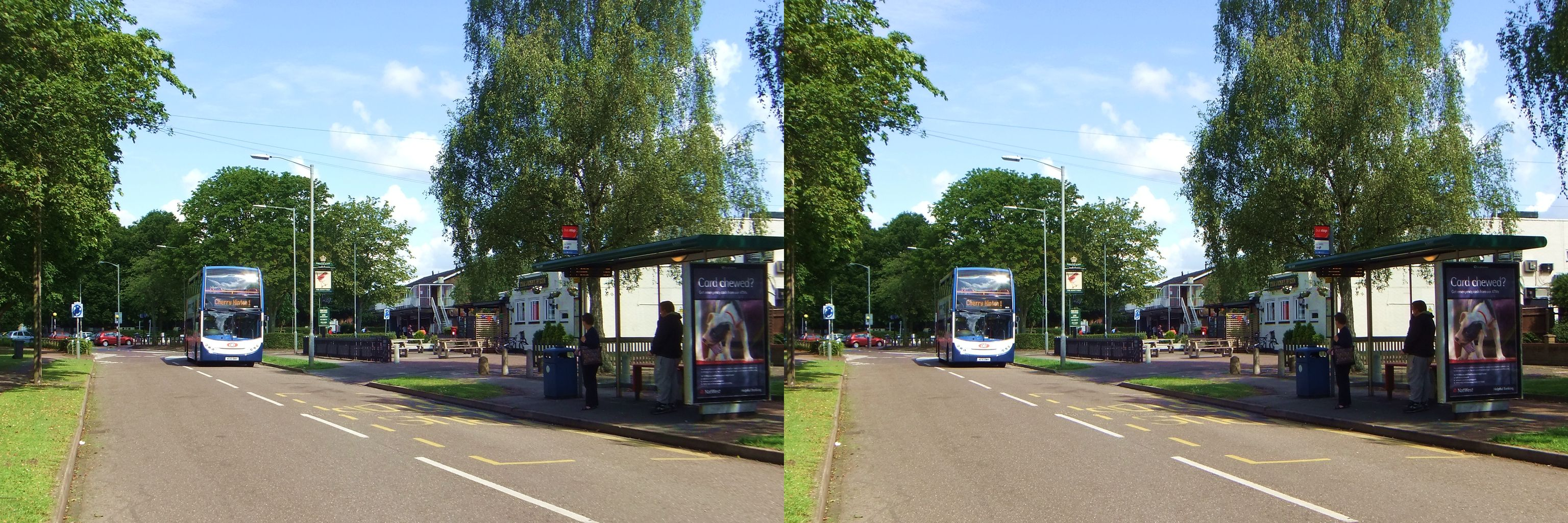
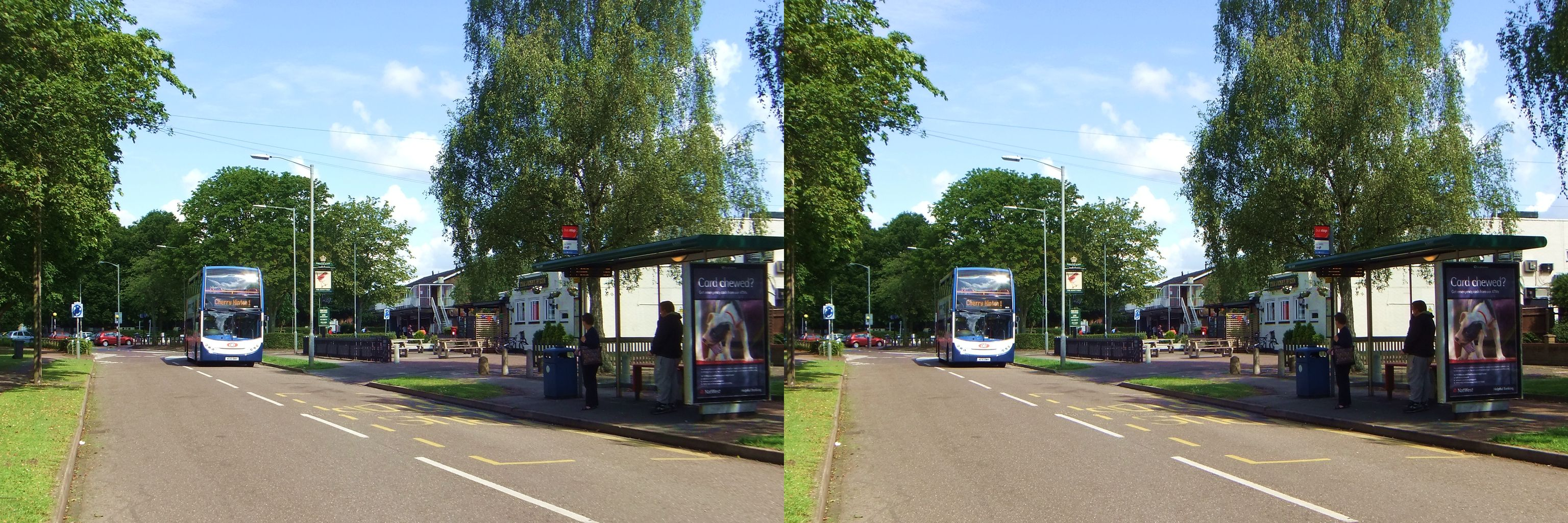
Stereo image Right frame Left frame Cross-eye view Parallel view: The Jenny Wren pub and bus stop with an approaching Citi 1 bus.

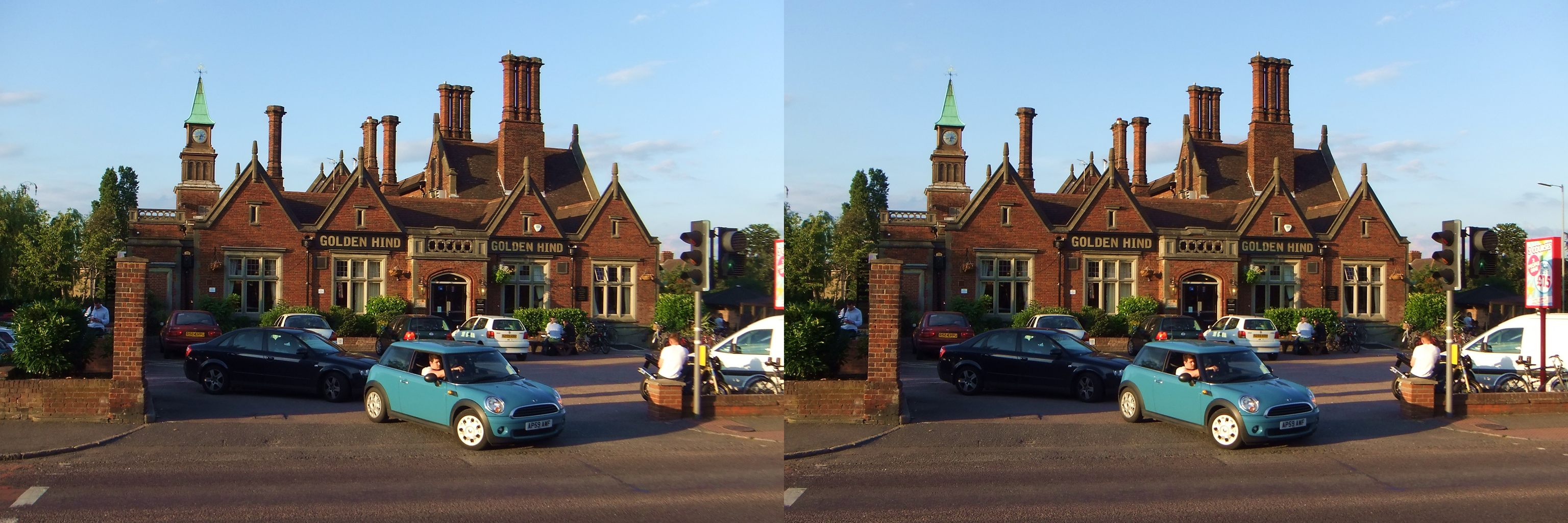
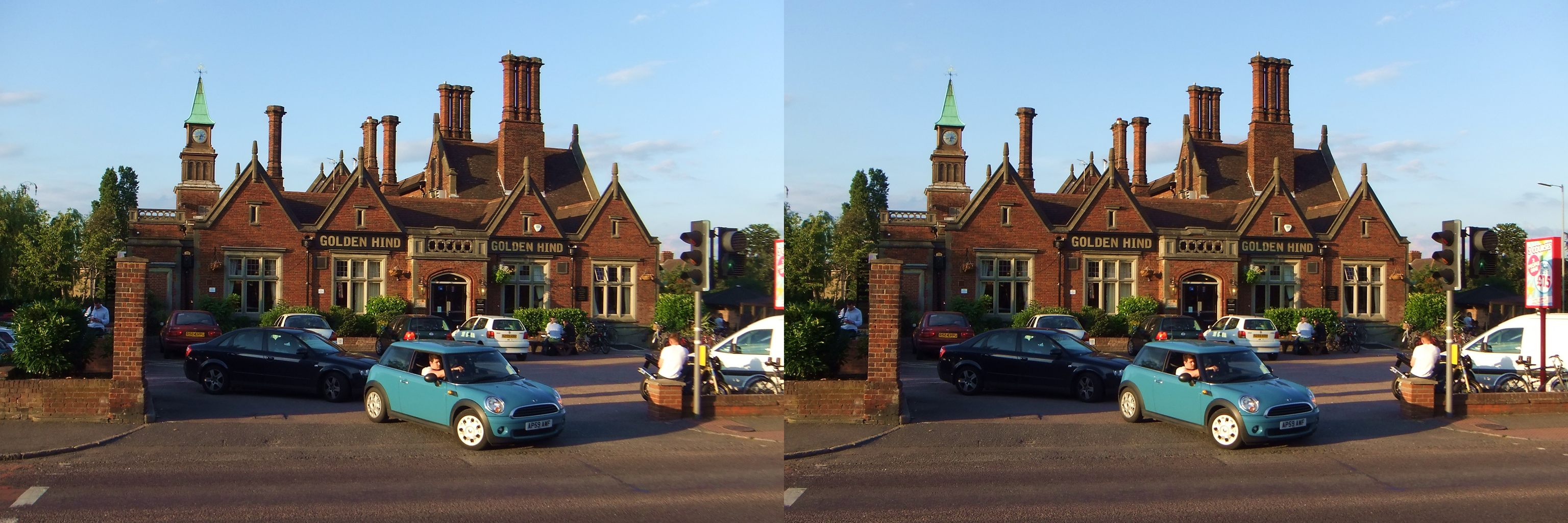
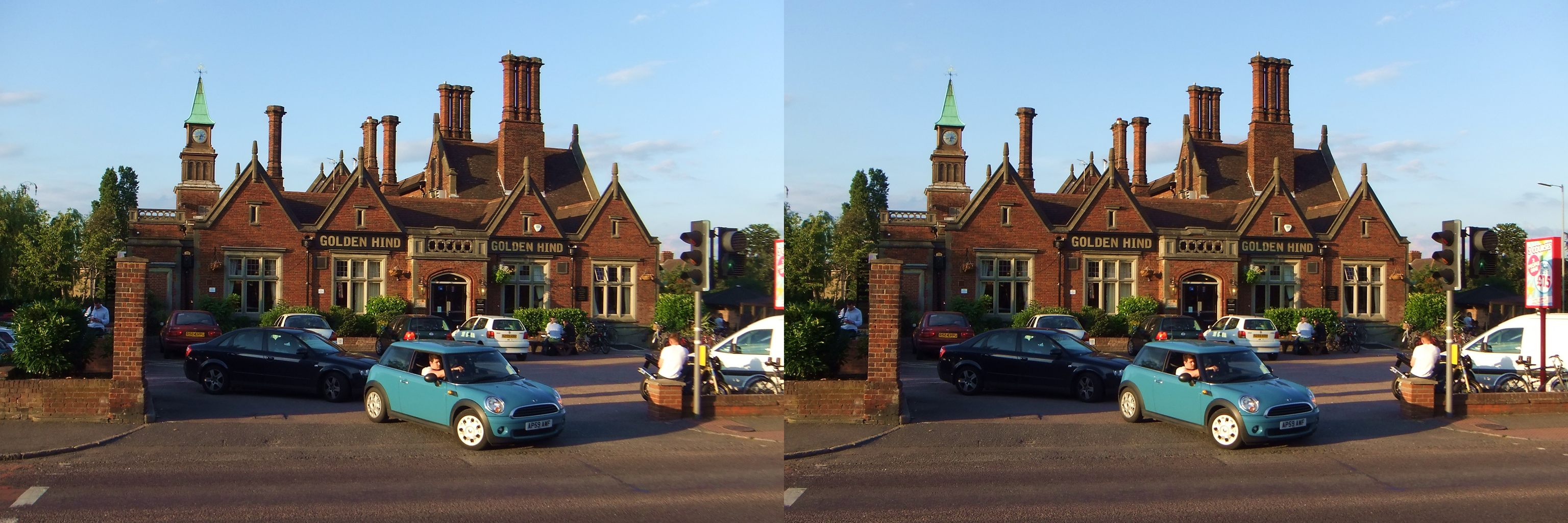
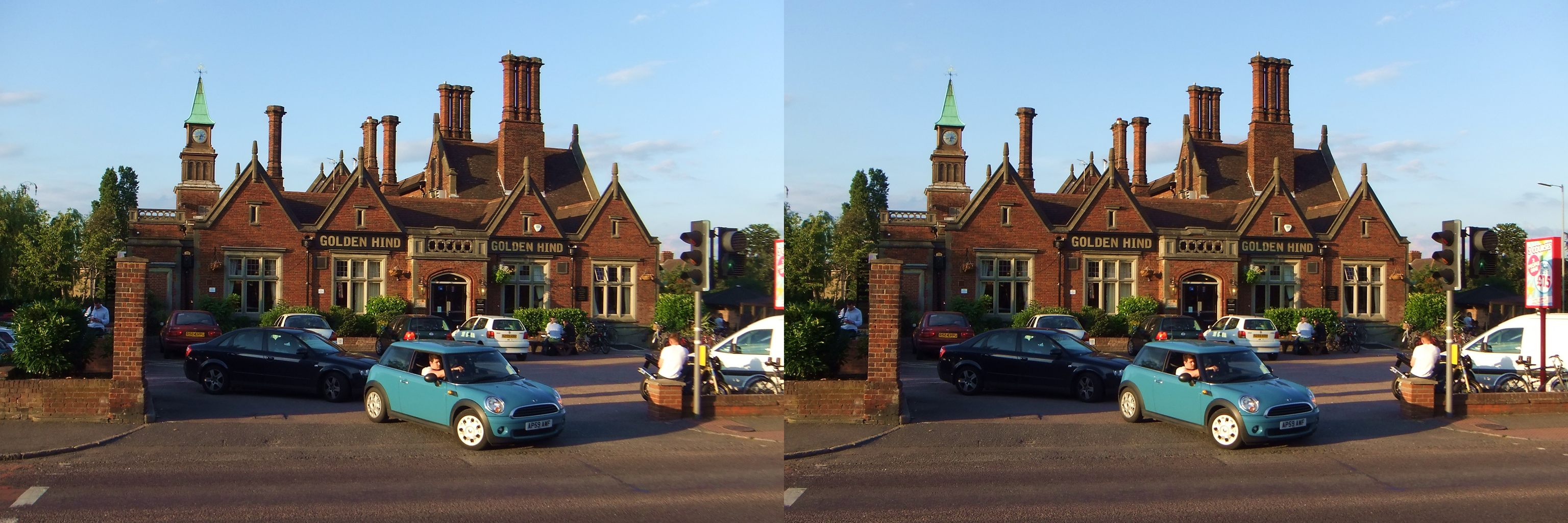
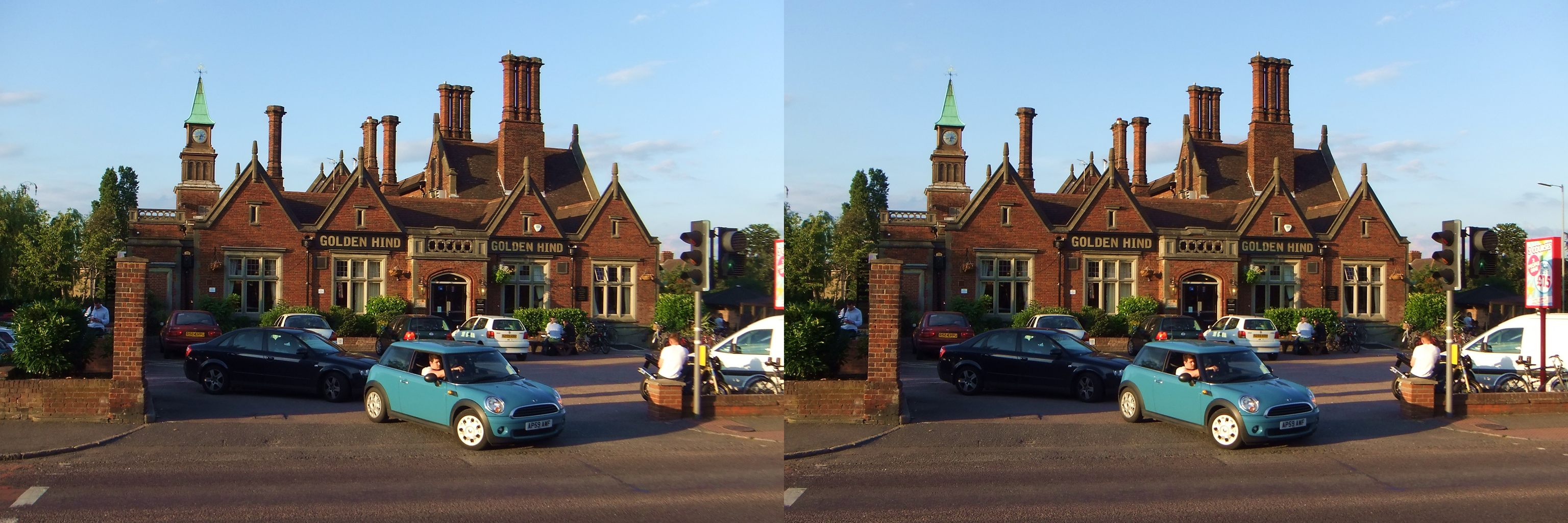
Stereo image Right frame Left frame Cross-eye view Parallel view: The Golden Hind pub .

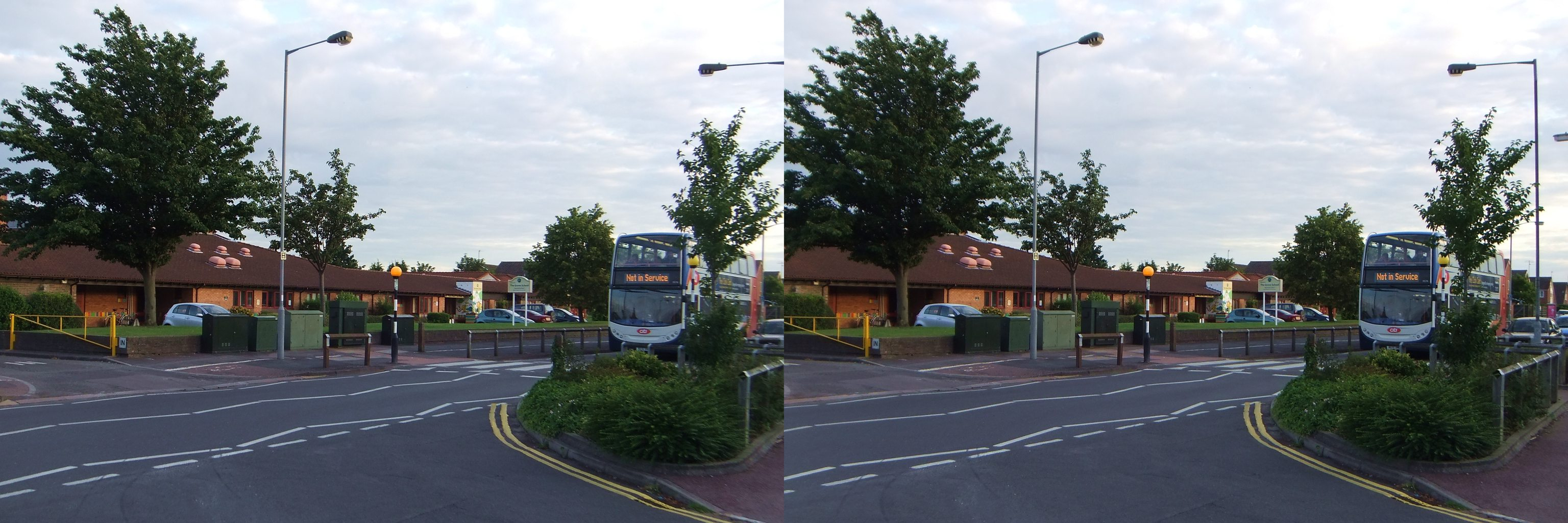
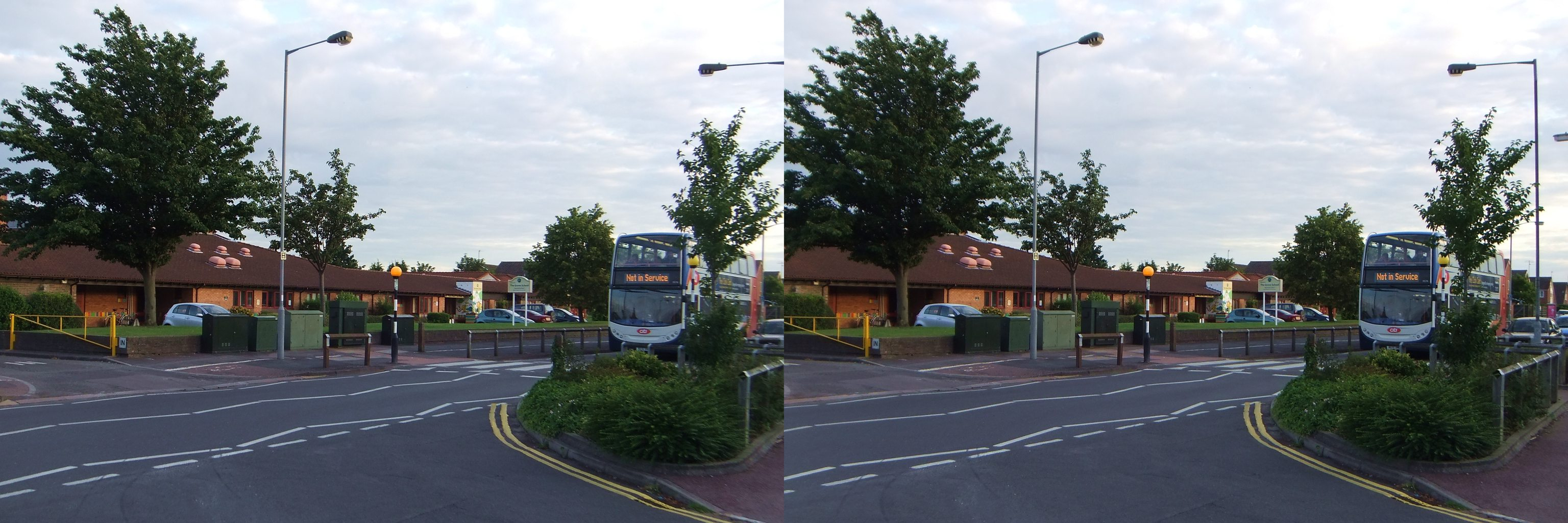
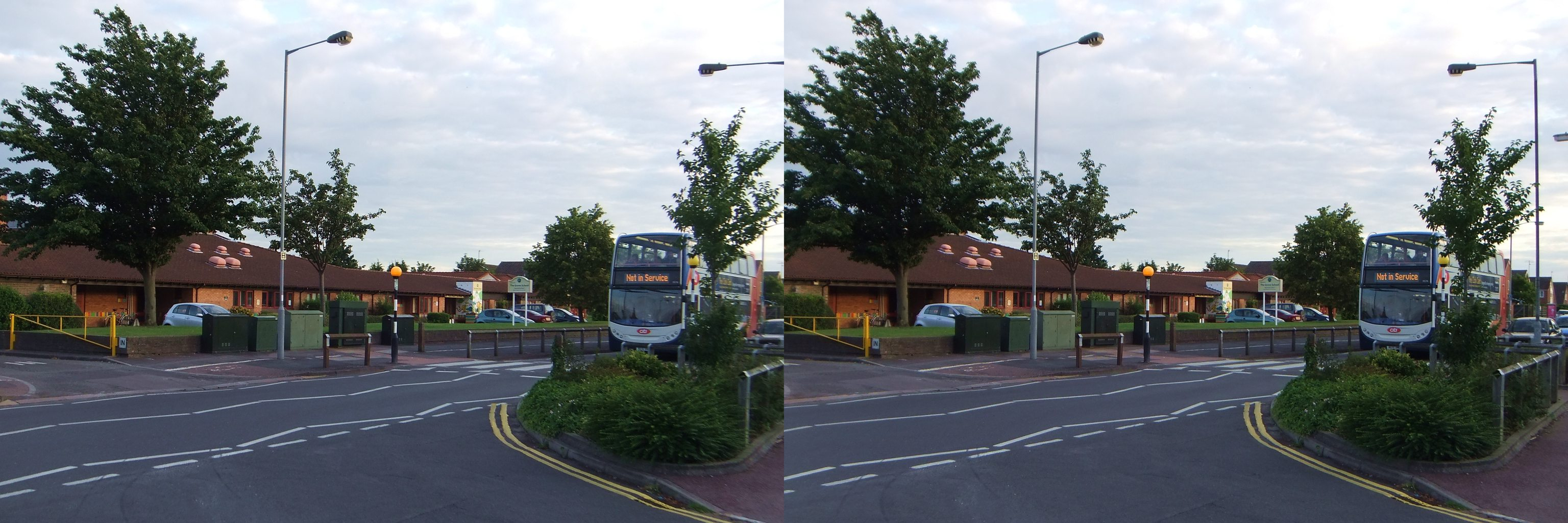
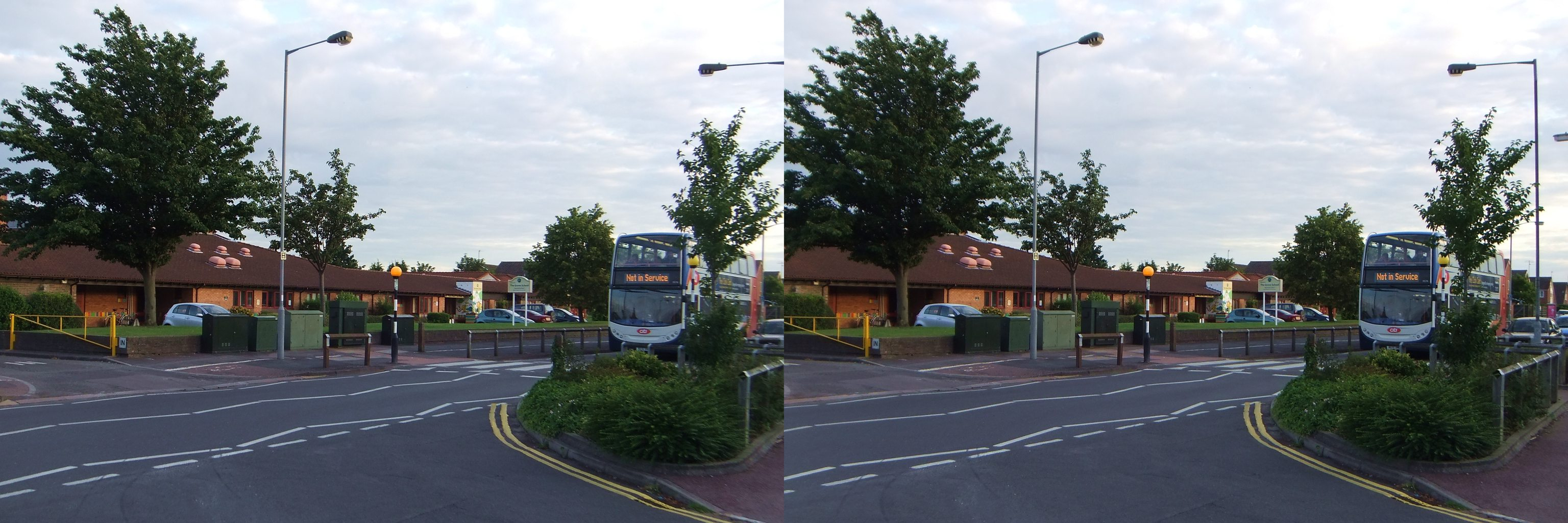
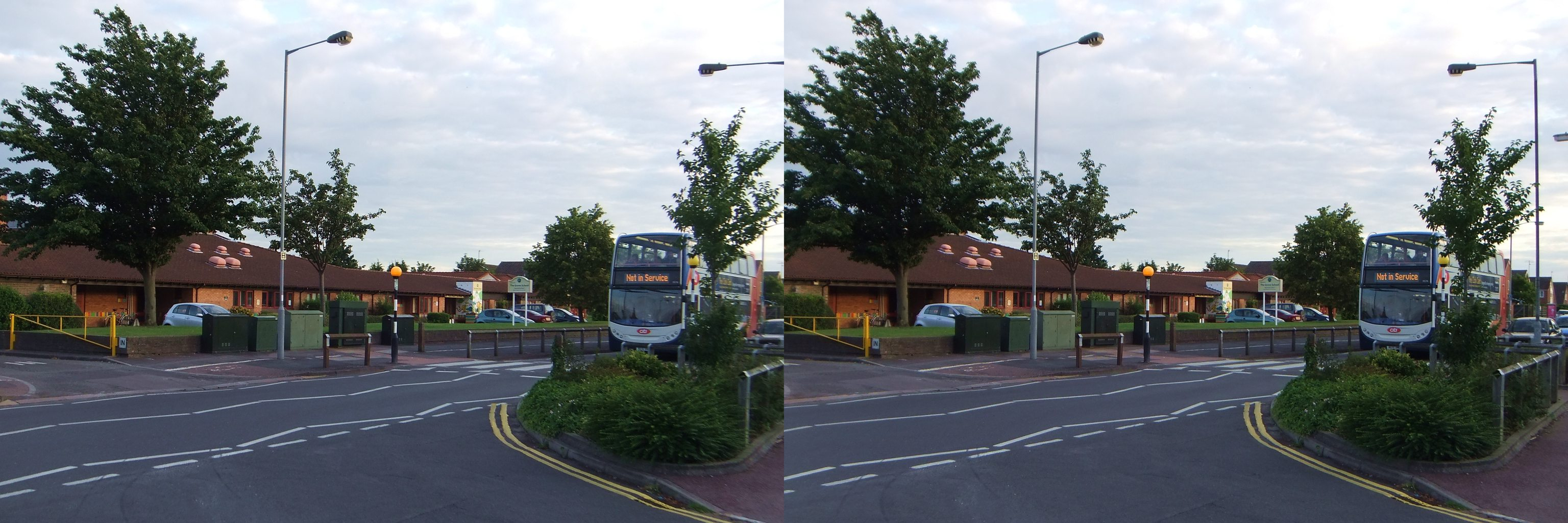
Stereo image Right frame Left frame Cross-eye view Parallel view: The Grove Primary School, opposite the Arbury Town Park in Campkin Road..
