= Impington =

Village in Cambridgeshire, England

Coordinates: 52.247841°N 0.10923243°E

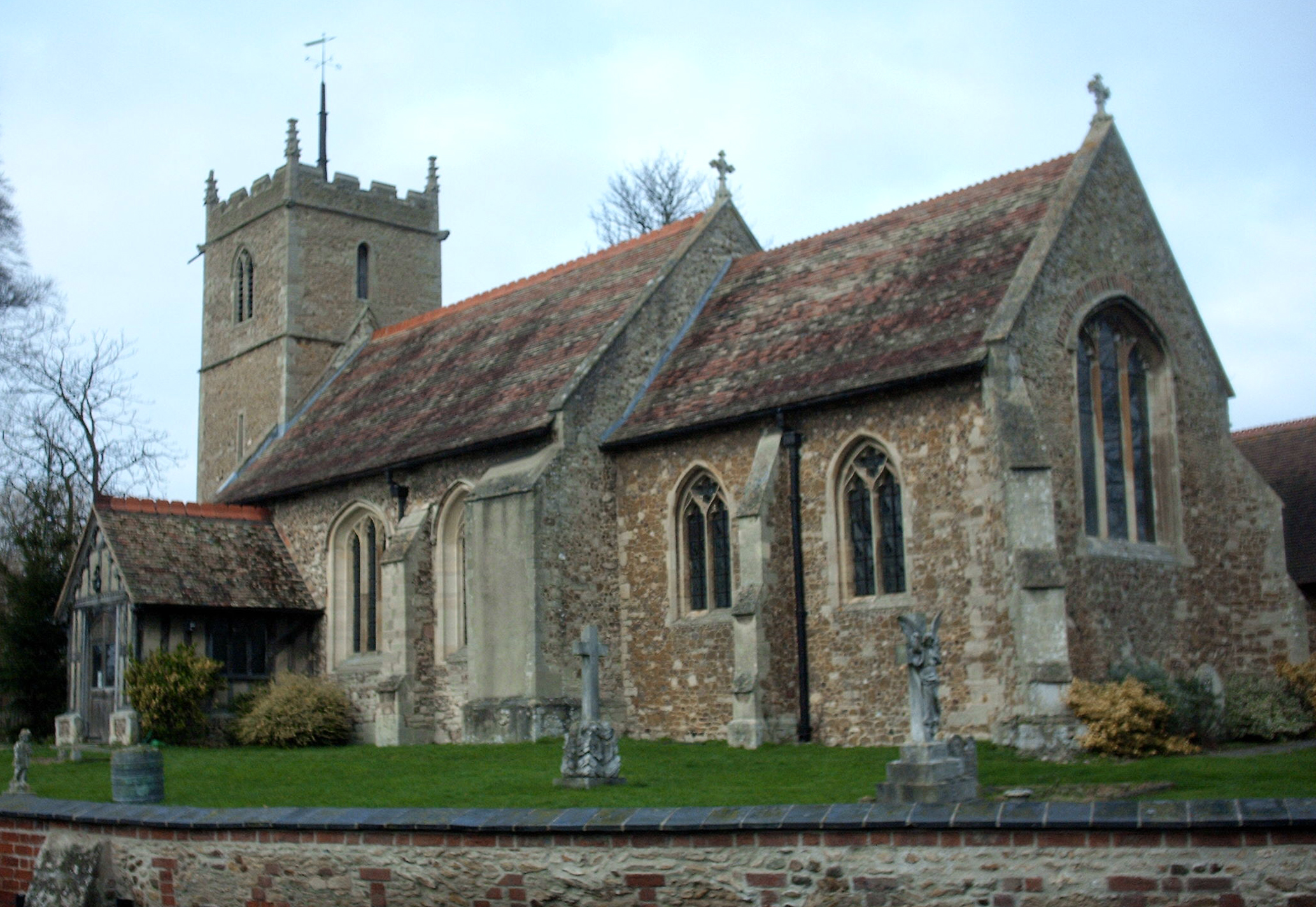

- Location within Cambridgeshire
- Area: 7.024 km^{2} (2.712 sq mi)
- Population: 4,400 (2021 census)
  - Density: 626/km^{2} (1,620/sq mi)
- Civil parish: Impington
- District: South Cambridgeshire
- Shire county: Cambridgeshire
- Region: East
- Country: England
- Sovereign state: United Kingdom
- Post town: CAMBRIDGE
- Postcode district: CB24
- Dialling code: 01223
- UK Parliament: South East Cambridgeshire
- Website: http://www.hisimp-pc.gov.uk

Impington is a village and civil parish about 3 miles north of Cambridge city centre, in the South Cambridgeshire district, in the county of Cambridgeshire, England. It forms part of the Cambridge built-up area. In 2011 the parish had a population of 4,060. The parish borders Girton, Histon, Landbeach, Milton and Orchard Park. Impington shares a parish council with Histon called "Histon & Impington Parish Council".

== Toponymy ==
The name of the village has been recorded in various guises. In the Domesday Book of 1086 it was recorded as Epintone, but it has also been recorded as Empinton, Ympiton, Impinton, Hinpinton and Impynton.

The name is probably Anglo-Saxon and made of three parts, each corresponding to a syllable. The meaning of the second and third is 'belonging to' ('-ing') and 'farmstead or place' ('-ton'). The first part may refer to a person, 'Impa' or Empa', so the village name means 'Impa's place or farm'. But given the Domesday Book spelling 'Epin', the first part might have the same meaning as in 'Epping' - 'a platform or raised place'. Impington might even mean 'place belonging to the imps', since 'imp' had its modern meaning in Anglo-Saxon.

== History ==
The earliest part of Impington to be inhabited is near the junction of Cambridge Road and Arbury Road, where there is a large ancient settlement, thought to have been built by the ancient Celtic Britons. The settlement was taken over by the Roman conquest of Britain. There are several roads in Impington that are thought to be based on Roman roads. The Parish probably dates from about the sixth century, when a Saxon tribe called the Empings lived there. Over time, dukes have gone off to help prevent the Danes from invading, while William I sorted out an argument over the town (then 'Epintone') between the Norman Sheriff of Cambridge and the Church.

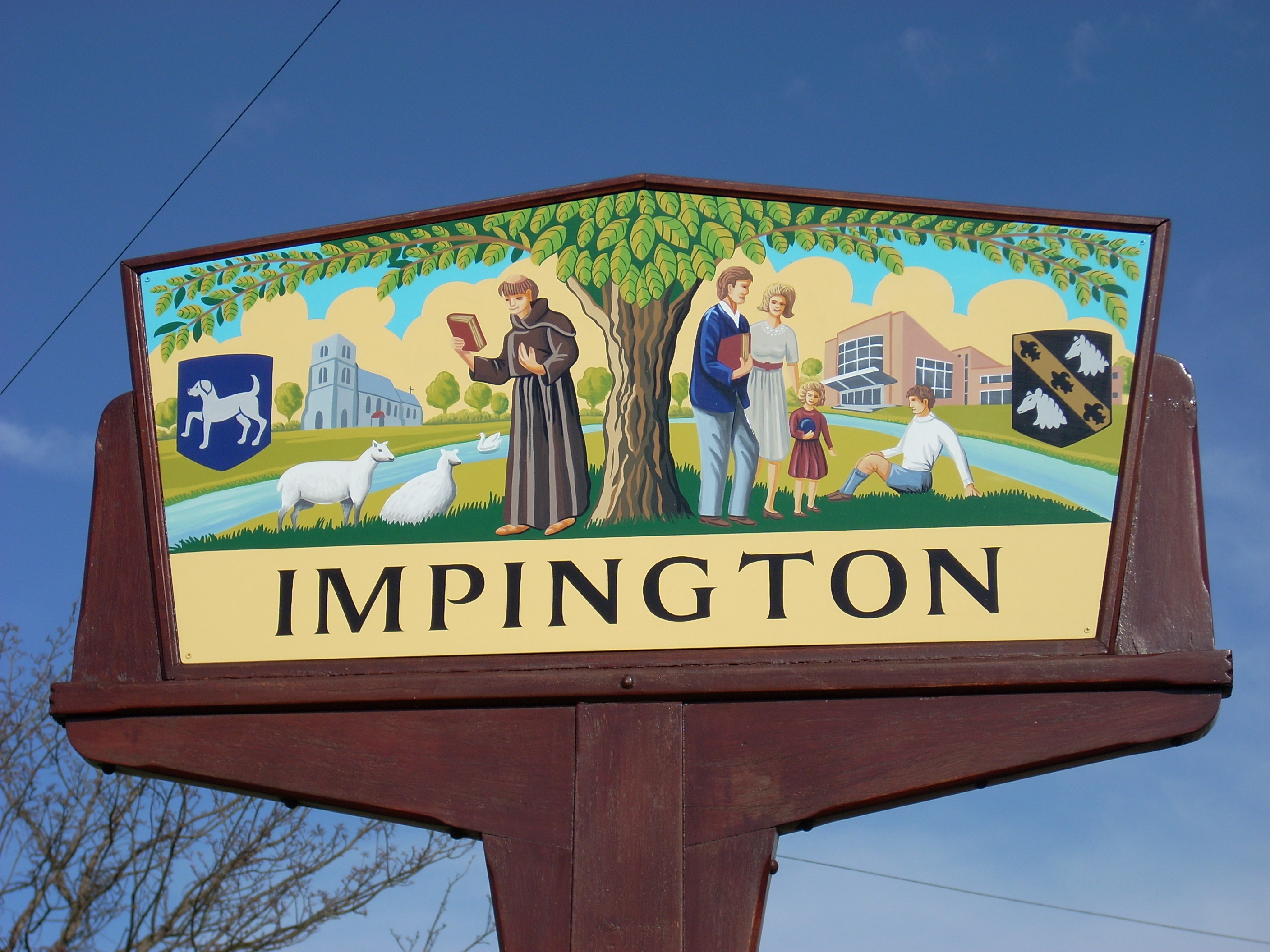
Village sign of Impington

The first area of settlement in the village was to the extreme south of the current village, close to current road junction of the Cambridge and Kings Hedges Road (once called Arbury camp, this land has now been developed as part of the large Orchard Park housing development). There was a large Iron Age fort here that was built by the Iceni to defend against the invading Celts; this was later occupied by the Romans. The main evidence left today of the Roman occupation is the Roman road, Akeman Street (known locally as the Mereway), this cuts through the edge of Impington and heads for The Fens. This route had fallen into disuse by the 11th century.

The first mention of Impington by name was in the year 991 when Earl Byrhtnoth, who then owned Impington, left the village in the charge of the abbot of Ely, when he went off to fight the Vikings who had invaded the region, he was killed at the Battle of Maldon in Essex. After Byrhtnoth's death Impington became the property of the abbey at Ely, during the Reformation the Abbey at Ely was more fortunate and was turned into a cathedral church. With a dean and chapter, Impington's lands were protected and they then became its "patrons of living." It was not until 1870 that they handed the patronage to the owner of Impington Hall in exchange for the living of Pirton in Hertfordshire.

In the Domesday Book, Impington was said to answer for 6½ hides (780 acres (3.2 km^{2})). Just before this time, Picot, the Norman sheriff of Cambridge, was ordered by a writ of William I to hand back 3 hides of Impington that had been stolen, by now the main centre of the village appears to have been around the church area present-day Burgoynes Road.

By 1428, the manor had come to the lawyer John Burgoyne of Dry Drayton (d. 1435), whose son Thomas (d. 1470) left it to his eldest son John (d. 1505). John's widow Margaret held Impington until her death in 1528, when it passed under a settlement of 1512 to their daughters Margaret, wife of George Heveningham, and Elizabeth, wife of Thomas Thursby. A partition of the estate was made in 1574, and by the 1580s the shares were distinguished as Manor Place Part and Ferme (i.e. farm) Part, names deriving from the division of the estate in 1574.

Manor Place Part, ultimately reverting to the name Burgoynes, came after the deaths of Margaret in 1529 and George in 1530 to their daughters Alice, Mary, and Anne. On Mary's death in 1532 or 1533 it was evidently redivided, like Burgoynes manor at Caxton, between Alice, wife of Thomas Green, and Anne, wife of Sir Ambrose Jermyn. Jermyn later acquired Green's share, probably in 1549, and sold the estate in 1559 to Robert Raye, who sold it in 1569 to feoffees for Christ's College, Cambridge, obtaining a 70-year lease. The feoffees formally conveyed the manor to the college in 1601. Christ's held nearly 150 acres after enclosure in 1806 and sold the land in 1899 to W. A. Macfarlane-Grieve of Impington Hall. Burgoynes Farm north of the church, occasionally called a manor house, was rebuilt in the mid 19th century.

The other half manor, Ferme Part, was held by Thomas Thursby (d. 1543), his son Edmund (d. 1547), and for life by Edmund's widow Ursula, wife of Erasmus Spelman. Ursula's son Thomas Thursby, of age c. 1565, held it by 1567 and sold it in 1579 to John Pepys, the lessee from c. 1569.

In 1580 John Pepys began the building of Impington Hall but died before it was completed. It was finished by his executors for Talbot Pepys, his six-year-old son, uncle to the famous diarist, Samuel Pepys, who visited the hall regularly. The hall was demolished after a fire in 1953 by the then owners Chivers & Sons Ltd.

== Landmarks ==
=== St Andrew's, Impington ===
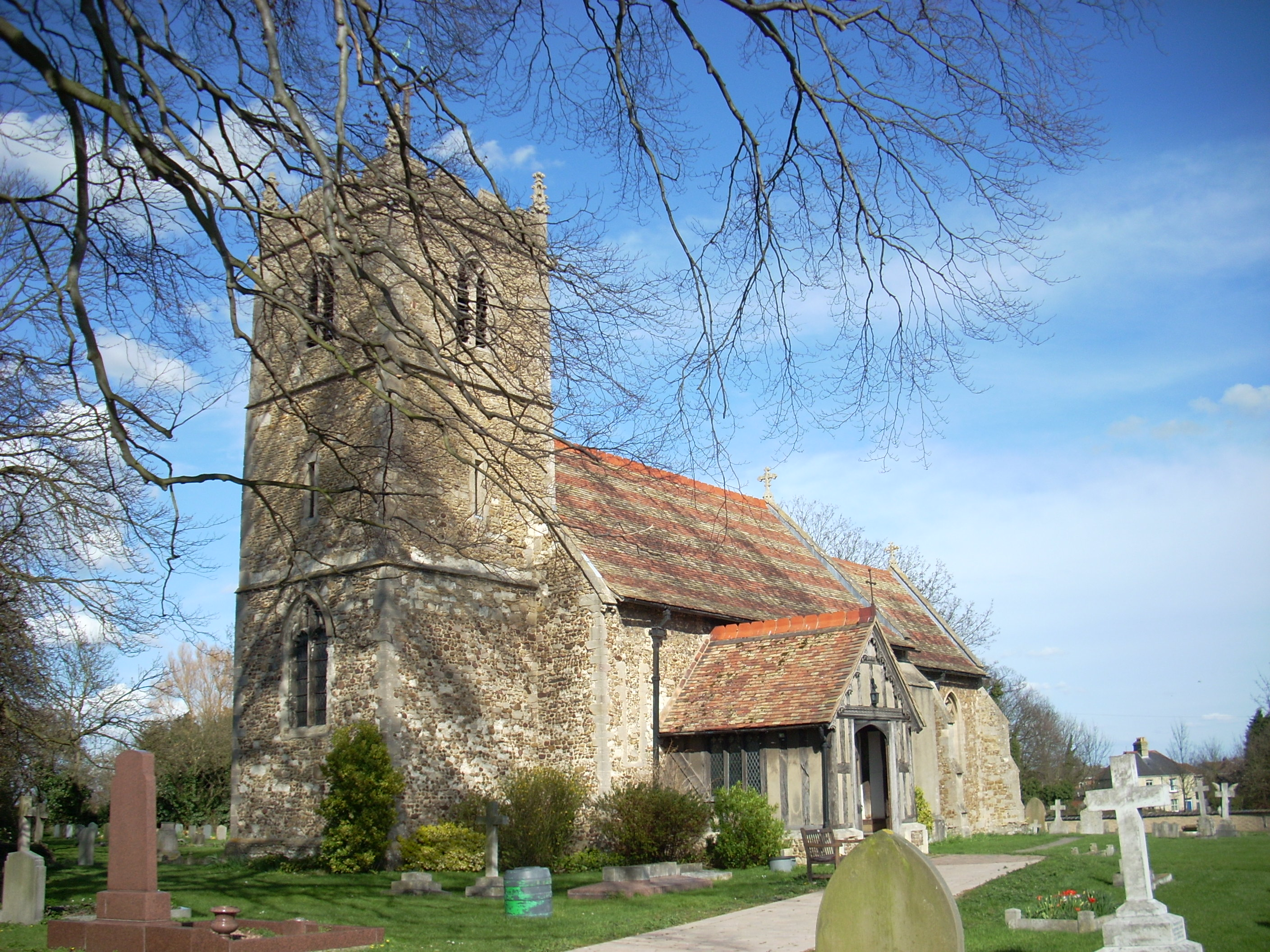
Church of St Andrew, Impington

The original building was constructed about 1130 and appears to have been dedicated originally to St Etheldreda. Its first use was not as a church for the parish but to transcribe books for the prior of Ely. The first vicar was not appointed until the 13th century and since then it has been mainly rebuilt in the 14th and 15th centuries. The church was built of fieldstones and masonry rubble and the stones from the original building can still be seen. The original churchyard wall was built in 1614 but this crumbling wall was replaced in 2005 after a £50,000 grant from the Heritage Lottery Fund. The tower contains three bells at least two of which date from the 15th century.

== Education ==
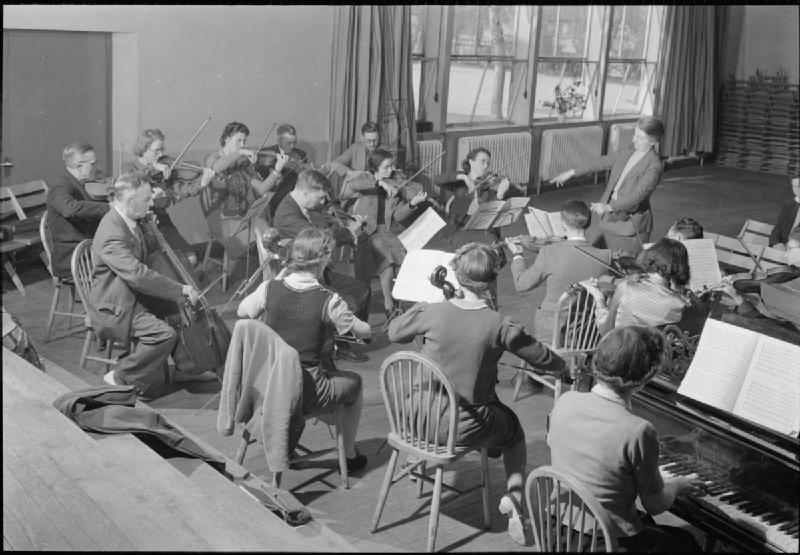
Music students at Impington College in 1944

=== Impington National School ===
Impington National School was built opposite Impington church in 1846. This school room was 15 by 22 ft (4.6 by 6.7 m) and was meant to hold 48 pupils but by 1880 it was too small to accommodate the rapidly growing population so the school house was sold and the money raised was used to buy land on Broad Close (later called School Lane). A new school was built, with two classrooms to hold 72 pupils. When Histon and Impington school opened in New School Road in 1913 this school became the infants school for both villages. In 1939 Impington Village College opened, the infants were moved to New School Road and this school closed. The old school's foundation stone found a resting place in Impington churchyard; in 2005 it was built into the new churchyard wall.

In 1943 the Impington national school building was reopened as a nursery school for children of women on war work. This remained until 1962 when it was demolished in order to make way for Bridge Road, The county council decided to build a new nursery school. It was opened in 1963 and at the time was the only purpose-built nursery school in the county.

=== Histon and Impington Infants School ===
This was built in 1912 with the land and money being given by John Chivers and was opened in 1913 for all children of the villages from eight to fourteen. It became a primary school in 1939 with the opening of Impington college, and an infants a while after the opening of the junior school, on the green. Recently, the school has changed its name to "Histon Impington Park School and is situated on a nearby farm.

=== Histon and Impington Junior School ===
This school was opened in 1970 but it was not until the mid-to-late 1970s that it was enlarged to become the junior school. Until then, the two Histon and Impington schools had the same head teacher, who had to cycle from school to school every day. The new junior school was built on the village green and was at first just four classrooms, two for each of years 3 and 4 (ages 9–11), when the first pupils attended. It was opened in January 1972. Pupils first went to the old junior school in the morning, packed a box of their things from their desks and then were walked up to the new junior school.

=== Impington Village College ===
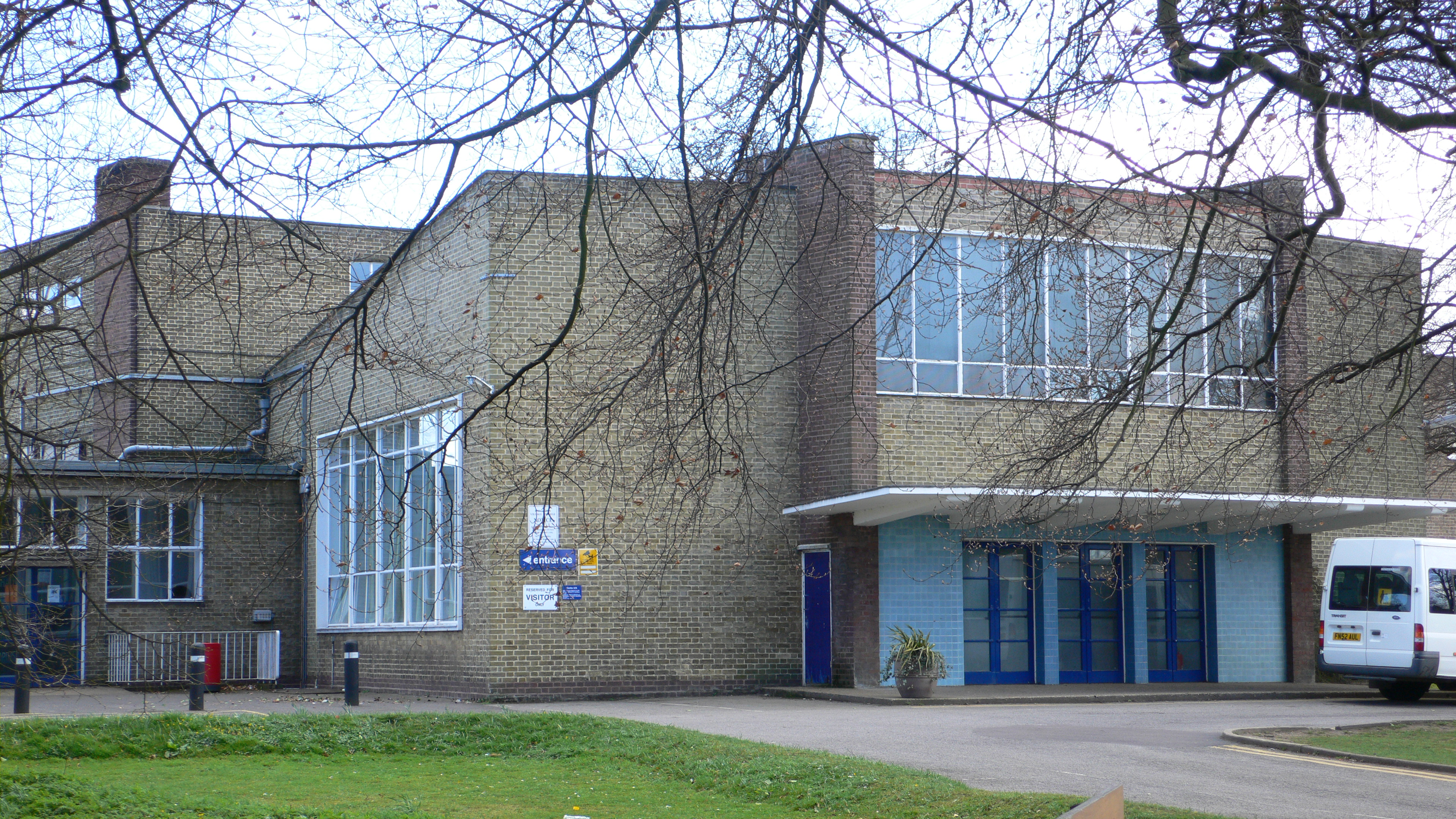
Impington Village College

Impington Village College is the main secondary school in the area. It was opened in 1939 (and had its 75 anniversary in 2014), two weeks after the outbreak of World War II, making it the fourth village college to be opened in Cambridgeshire. As a village college, it was originally intended to encompass all aspects of learning in the village, and included prominent space for adult education and 1st Histon Scouts. Henry Morris, founder of the Village College system, saw to it that prominent architects were employed to design these colleges. The college was designed by Walter Gropius, founder of The Bauhaus School of Architecture, and his partner Maxwell Fry. This is the only example of Gropius's work in Britain and the building is now Grade I listed building.

== Leisure ==
The only pub remaining in Impington is the Railway Vue which underwent a makeover in September 2025. The pub was established by 1886. It is now part of the Punch Pubs group.

== Notable people ==
In February 1799, a local woman named Elizabeth Woodcock became a nationwide sensation after she survived for eight days buried in snow after a blizzard. She died five months later. The poet and comedian Tim Key grew up in Impington.
