= Arbury Park =

Arbury Park may refer to:

- Arbury Park, former name of Orchard Park, Cambridgeshire, England
- Arbury Park, former name of Raywood, Aldgate, an historic home and gardens in South Australia
