= Cambridgeshire Guided Busway =

Busway system in England

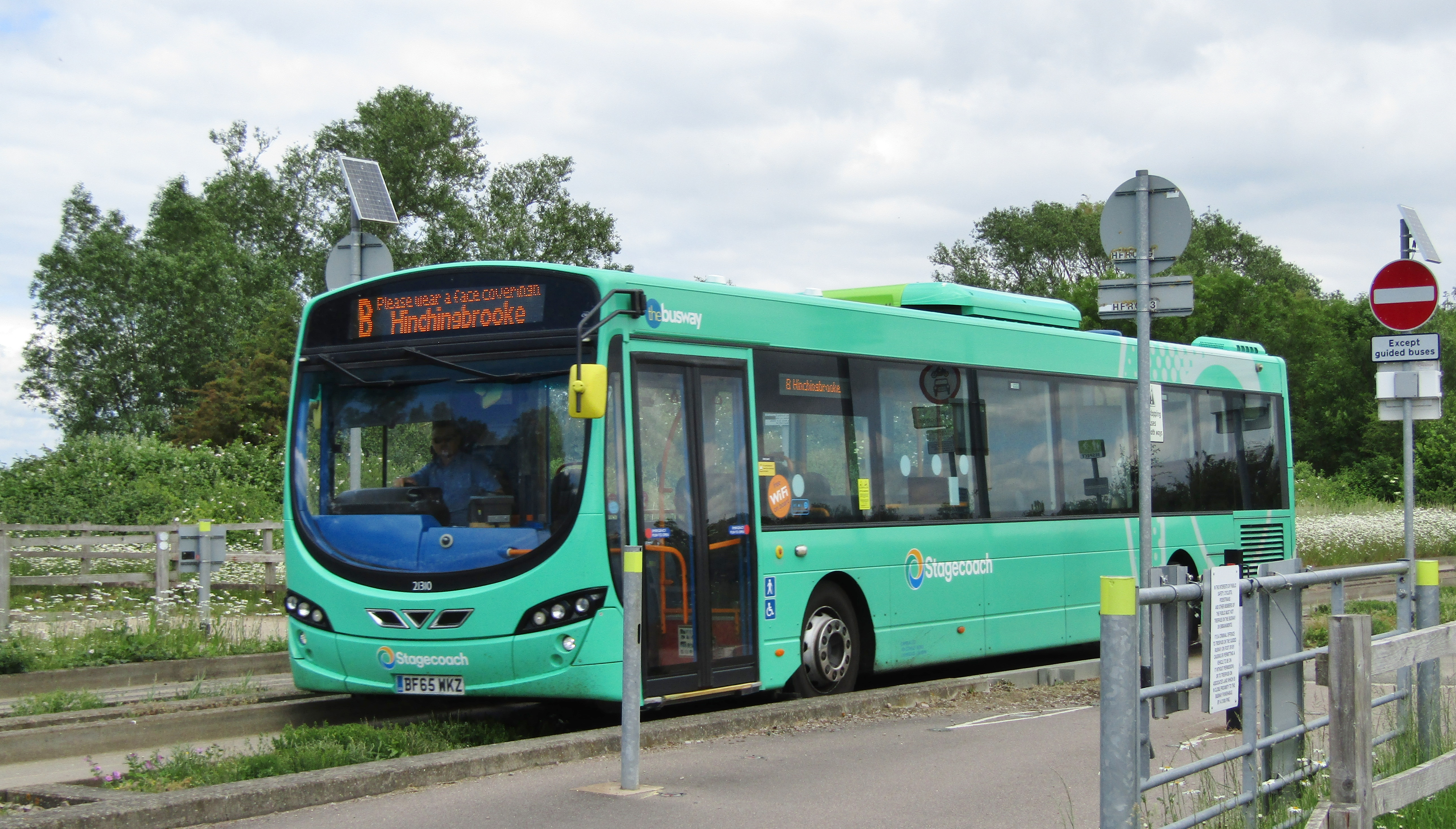
- A guided busway bus during June 2021.

Overview
- Owner: Cambridgeshire County Council
- Locale: Cambridgeshire, United Kingdom
- Transit type: Guided busway and bus rapid transit
- Website: www.thebusway.info

Operation
- Began operation: 7 August 2011; 15 years ago
- Operators: Stagecoach East, Whippet

Technical
- System length: 16 miles (25 km)

The Cambridgeshire Guided Busway is a guided busway and bus rapid transit that connects Cambridge, Huntingdon and St Ives in Cambridgeshire, England. It is the longest guided busway in the world, surpassing the O-Bahn Busway in Adelaide, South Australia.

Two guided sections make up 16 miles (25 km) of the route. The northern section, which uses the course of the former Cambridge and Huntingdon railway, runs through the former stations of Oakington, Long Stanton and Histon. The southern section, which uses part of the former Varsity Line to Oxford, links Cambridge railway station, Addenbrooke's Hospital and the park-and-ride site at Trumpington via housing on the Clay Farm site.

Services are operated by Stagecoach in Huntingdonshire and Whippet, which have exclusive use of the route for five years in exchange for providing a minimum service frequency between 07:00 and 19:00 each weekday. Specially adapted buses are used: the driver does not need to hold the steering wheel on the guided sections of the busway. A total of 2,500,000 trips were made in the first year of operation.

The busway was proposed in the 2001 Cambridge-Huntingdon Multi-Modal Study, which recommended widening the A14 road and the construction of a guided busway along the old railway lines. Construction began in March 2007 and it was opened on 7 August 2011 after a succession of delays and cost overruns.

The original cost estimate of £116 million rose to £181 million by December 2010. An independent review of the project was announced on 21 September 2010, in which the Cambridge MP, Julian Huppert, described the busway as a "white elephant". A court case with BAM Nuttall, the main contractor, was settled by Cambridgeshire County Council in August 2013.

== Overview ==
The busway links Cambridge, in East Anglia, with St Ives, Huntingdon and Northstowe (a proposed new town) to the north-west, and with the M11 motorway to the south. The route includes two sections of guided operation, a bus-only road and other places with on-street operation in conventional bus lanes. New park and ride sites have been built at Longstanton and at St Ives, with a tarmac cycle track/bridleway alongside some sections of the route. The final scheme includes bus priority and real-time passenger information system displays at busway bus stops, and subsequent separate funding and works to better link those stops to local businesses for pedestrians and cyclists.

A total of 2,500,000 trips were made in the first year of operation, which Atkins reported was 40% higher than the predicted figure. Bus use along the corridor was estimated to have increased by 33% over the same period. Before opening, the contractor had predicted that an estimated 11,500 journeys per day would be made on the busway. The scheme was predicted to cause a direct reduction in traffic on the busy parallel A14 road of 5.6% (rising to 11.1% with the new Park & Ride sites), although as other traffic re-routes to the freed-up road space from other parts of the local road network, the net reduction is predicted to be 2.3%. The overall scheme was "not intended to solve the congestion problems on the A14" by itself, but will rather have an overall effect across the local road network, and be complementary to planned improvements on the A14.

== Route ==
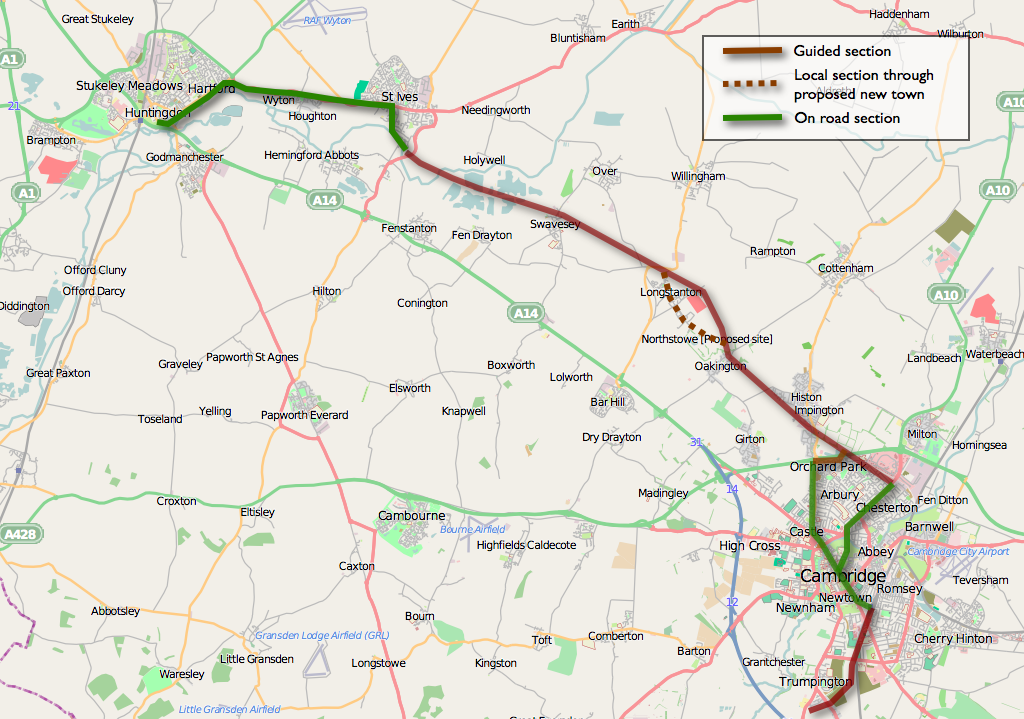
Cambridgeshire Guided Busway network between Huntingdon (top-left) and Cambridge (bottom-right)

Starting at Huntingdon railway station and town centre, buses travel on normal roads to St Ives. From here the busway follows the path of the former Cambridge and Huntingdon railway to a new park and ride site south of the town, where it becomes guided. The buses stop at Swavesey, Longstanton, Oakington and Histon, with a request stop for the nature reserve at Fen Drayton. Should a proposed new town at Northstowe be built, further stops would be opened, with the Northstowe developers Gallagher Construction being encouraged to build the busway through the development beforehand.

Upon entering Cambridge, the route diverges. One route has stops at Cambridge Regional College and Cambridge Science Park, before it rejoins the road network into central Cambridge. The other joins the road network at Orchard Park (formerly Arbury Park), before continuing to the city centre. The two forks converge at Cambridge bus station for the journey to Cambridge railway station. Beyond Cambridge railway station the buses are guided along the former Cambridge-Oxford railway (The Varsity Line) south to Addenbrooke's Hospital and Trumpington Park and Ride. This section last saw a scheduled passenger train in 1967.

=== Infrastructure ===
Wheel-on-kerb method: on the guideway, small wheels touching the kerbs keep the buses in the centre and the bus driver lets go of the steering wheel.

The busway is designed for buses travelling at 55 miles per hour (89 km/h), slowing to 30 miles per hour (48 km/h) where it crosses public highways. Bus drivers are asked to drive as they would do on a normal road. Guidance is achieved using the guidewheel-on-concrete-kerb method, with the busway constructed from pre-cast concrete sections that are 15 metres (49 ft) long and 2.6 metres (8.5 ft) wide. Additionally, the guide wheels will aid close positioning at slightly modified bus stops within the on-street sections.

The busway is 6 metres (20 ft) wide, consisting of two 2.6 metres (8.5 ft) wide tracks separated by a central reservation of 80 centimetres (31 in). Between Cambridge and St Ives there is also a 4-metre (13 ft) wide (maximum) bridleway/maintenance track to one side and a 70-centimetre (28 in) evacuation strip to the other creating a total width of 10.7 metres (35 ft). Where necessary it is narrower; for example through the Trumpington cutting where there is a single busway with a narrower maintenance-only track giving a total width of approximately 6.3 metres (21 ft). In 2010, proposals were made to reduce the width of the bridleway, narrowing it to 3 metres (9.8 ft) and increasing the height in order to combat flooding. Elevated sections have two evacuation strips at busway level with the bridleway/maintenance track at the base of the embankment. The bridleway is usable by people on foot, bicycle and horse.

The 6-metre (20 ft) width of the busway is narrower than the 9.3-metre (31 ft) width of a single-carriageway rural all-purpose road built to 2009 standards (excluding attendant verges and footpaths/cyclepaths in both cases). A conventional road would have been too wide to fit on top of existing railway embankments and across the under-bridges along parts of the route. The maintenance track is either adjacent to the busway on flat land, or to one side at the foot of the former railway embankments—the combined width of the maintenance track and the busway being considerably wider than that of the railway it had replaced. To negotiate Trumpington Cutting on the southern section, a narrower maintenance track was required, along with the use of a bi-directional single-track busway to fit the width of the former double-track railway line. The southern section is restricted to single-decker buses. In May 2012, the County Council received a petition calling for better night-time lighting for the bridleway alongside the southern section, and the need for this was subsequently acknowledged by the Council. Work on lighting was completed in autumn of 2015.

== Services ==
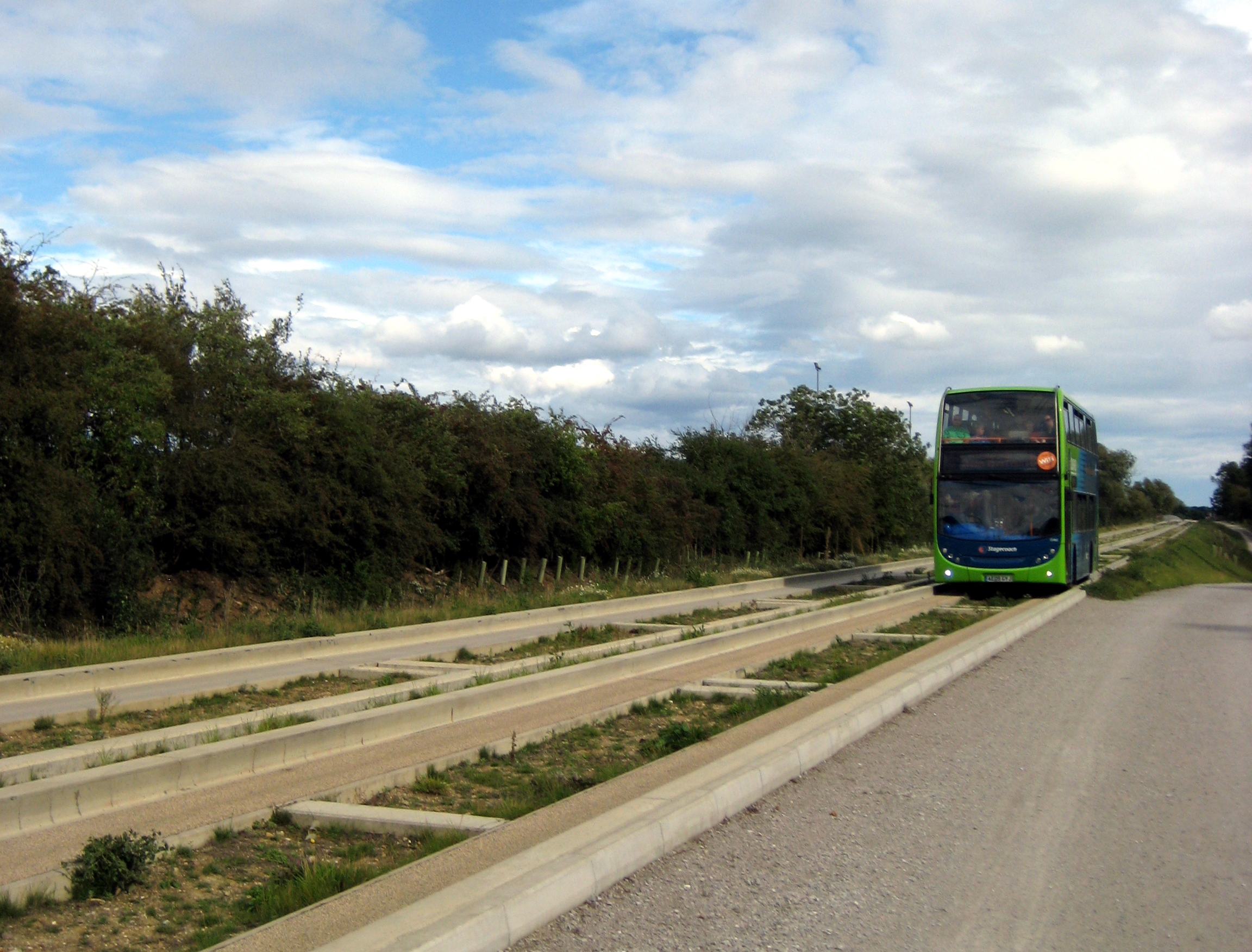
Stagecoach Route B bus travelling from Cambridge on the first full day of service on the busway, 7 August 2011.

=== Current services (as of August 2025) ===
Route A

Operated by Stagecoach, Route A operates between Trumpington Park & Ride, Addenbrooke's Hospital, Cambridge City Centre, Orchard Park and St Ives. Six buses an hour operate all day on Monday to Friday between Trumpington Park & Ride and St Ives Park & Ride, with alternating services extending into St Ives town centre; a reduced service runs 2-3 buses per hour on Saturdays and hourly on Sundays.

Route B

Operated by Stagecoach, Route B operates between Cambridge City Centre, Cambridge North, Science Park, St Ives, Huntingdon and Hinchingbrooke Hospital. Throughout the day, the route occasionally expands, making its final stop at Long Road Sixth Form College (replacing the now ended C service, also operated by Stagecoach). The Monday to Saturday off-peak timetable has three buses an hour. From late-2020 to mid-2021, Route B also served Trumpington Park & Ride and Addenbrooke's Hospital, providing additional capacity on the southern section of the busway whilst social distancing was in place.

Route U

Operated by Whippet, Route U was launched in July 2016, and is subsidised by the University of Cambridge. It currently operates from the Biomedical Campus and Addenbrooke’s Hospital to Cambridge railway station, Queens' College, the West Cambridge Site and Eddington. There are up to 4 buses an hour during the day Mondays to Fridays, up to three buses an hour during the day on Saturdays, and up to two buses an hour on Sundays. There is a half-hourly service in the evenings Mondays to Saturdays.

Whippet operated this service with seven Volvo/Wright Eclipse single-decker buses, with Universal branding in blue colours. However, in September 2023, the Eclipses were replaced by nine Battery-Electric Mellor Sigma 12 vehicles.

Route T1

Operated by Whippet for the Tiger Bus Network, Route T1 was launched in May 2025, and is subsidised by the Cambridgeshire and Peterborough Combined Authority. It currently operates from Huntingdon Railway Station to Cambridge City Centre, serving Huntingdon Bus Station and Fenstanton, before joining the Guided Busway at Swavesey and following the same route as the B into the city centre. However, it doesn't serve Cambridge North Station. It is an hourly service operating Mondays to Saturdays.

Connecting routes

In mid-2020, Stagecoach replaced several branches of the busway A & B with connecting routes to locations not on the core busway route. This includes Peterborough, now served by Route 904 and Royston on Route 915, but also Routes V1-V5 running to rural areas such as Ramsey and Chatteris. Initially these services were operated by Stagecoach; however, since October 2022 most of these services are now operated by smaller independent operators.

Route	Operator	Origin	Intermediate Points	Destination	Off-Peak buses per hour
A	Stagecoach in The Fens	Trumpington Park and Ride	Cambridge Biomedical Campus; Cambridge railway station Central Cambridge; Shire Hall; Histon & Impington; Longstanton Park and Ride	St Ives	6bph
B	Stagecoach in The Fens	Central Cambridge	Cambridge North Station; Cambridge Science Park; Histon & Impington; Longstanton Park and Ride; St Ives	Huntingdon railway station Hinchingbrooke Hospital	3bph
U	Go Whippet	Cambridge Biomedical Campus	Cambridge railway station Central Cambridge; Robinson College; Cavendish Laboratory	Eddington/Girton	4bph
T1	Go Whippet	Cambridge Drummer St Bus Station	Cambridge Science Park; Histon & Impington; Longstanton Park and Ride; Swavesey; Fenstanton	Huntingdon railway station Huntingdon bus station	1bph

=== Initial services (on opening in 2011) ===
Figures published in 2004 by Cambridgeshire County Council proposed that it would begin operation with six buses per hour and build up to 20 buses per hour into Cambridge during peak periods by 2016.

Two operators, Stagecoach in The Fens and Whippet, committed to buying new buses and running commercial services on the scheme.

The council had previously held talks with Cavalier (owner of Huntingdon and District, prior to being purchased by Stagecoach) and another operator.

Originally Stagecoach route A operated three times an hour from St Ives Park and Ride to Trumpington (Monday to Saturday daytime only) and route B operated three times an hour from Huntingdon to Cambridge (with an hourly evening service) Mondays to Saturdays. On Sundays route B ran three times per hour between Cambridge and St Ives, with one journey per hour continuing to Huntingdon. There was no Sunday evening service. Whippet also operated a route C from Somersham and St Ives to Cambridge.

To operate their services, Stagecoach ordered ten Eclipse/B7RLE single-decker buses, to be manufactured by Wrightbus and Volvo, and ten Alexander Dennis Enviro400/Scania N230UD double-deckers. All the specially-branded vehicles were equipped with leather seats, air chill or air conditioning, real time information, and free Wi-Fi. The new buses were deployed on Stagecoach's other services prior to the opening of the busway, having cost the operator a total of £3 million plus £1 million in staffing and training costs.

=== Withdrawn services ===
Whippet C

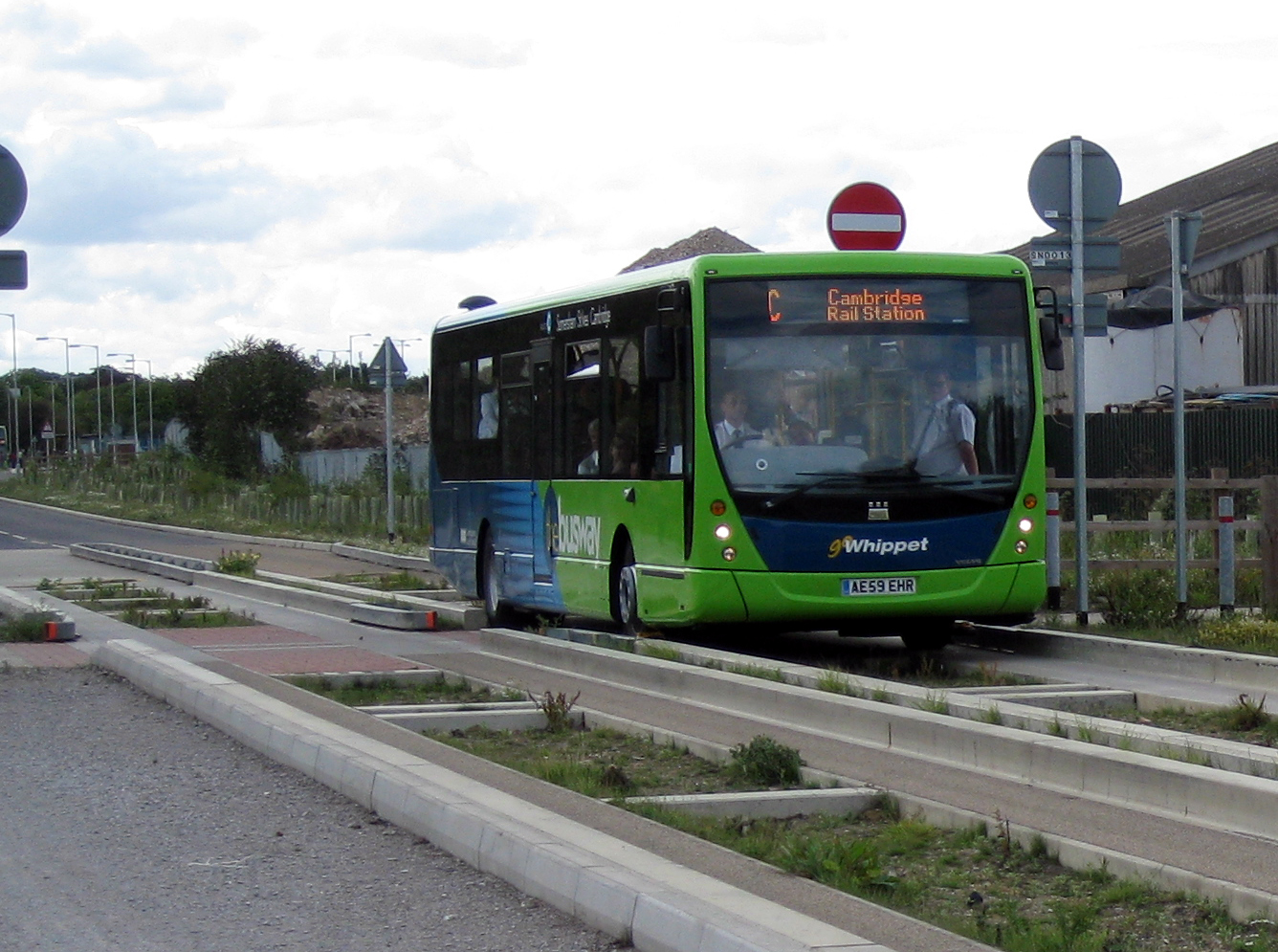
A Go Whippet Route C bus leaving St Ives on 7 August 2011.

This service was operated from the opening of the guided busway until withdrawal in November 2018. The initial service was from St Ives to Cambridge and operated broadly hourly during the daytime Mondays to Saturdays (with some services starting from or continuing to Somersham. An hourly Sunday service was added shortly after introduction. In 2016 the service operated hourly from St Ives to Cambridge and Cambridge Railway Station during the day on Mondays to Sundays.

Stagecoach N

Following the opening of Cambridge North, Stagecoach introduced a service from Longstanton Park and Ride to Cambridge via Cambridge North Station. From May to September 2017, this operated three times an hour Mondays to Saturdays daytimes (with a half hourly Sunday service being provided by route D). The service continued hourly until November 2018, when it was fully replaced by diverted A services operating as D.

Whippet P

From February to August 2019 Whippet operated 4 buses an hour from Cambridge to Cambridge Railway Station and Addenbrooke’s Hospital (with the first three morning and last three evening buses also serving Swavesey and operating via Orchard Park and stops on Histon Road). This service was withdrawn due to low passenger numbers.

Stagecoach D

After the withdrawal of Route N, Stagecoach introduced Route D, which were re-numbered Route A journeys operating via Cambridge North Station and stopping along Milton Road. This route was withdrawn in the summer of 2020 due to a simplification of Busway services, with the Cambridge North extension replaced by Route B.

Stagecoach H and R

Prior to September 2024, Stagecoach operated routes H and R to increase capacity on the southern section of the busway; the R ran between Cambridge railway station, Addenbrookes and Trumpington Park & Ride, while the H ran in the morning between Trumpington Park & Ride and Addenbrookes only. Both services were incorporated into the A in September 2024 to give a 10-minute frequency along the full length of the route.

=== Ticketing ===
Tickets are bought on the bus. Originally passengers boarding on guided sections were required to purchase their tickets before boarding from one of seventeen ticket issuing machines compatible with ITSO smartcards. Cash sales from ticket machines were stopped following vandalism of ticket machines in 2014, and the ticket machines were taken out of use completely in 2019; the contactless machine at the Trumpington P&R busway stop will, however, remain.

The Multibus multi-operator ticket for Cambridgeshire has never been accepted on guided busway services. Originally Cambridgeshire County Council stated that smartcard-based multi-operator ticketing would be supported, allowing passengers to board the first bus that arrived. They stated that such a ticket would be a first, but would take a while to perfect. A smartcard-based ticket that offered some of the promised features was available, but was withdrawn in November 2018 when Stagecoach became the only operator on the busway.

== History ==
=== Planning ===
In 2001 the Cambridge-Huntingdon Multi-Modal Study (CHUMMS) recommended widening of the A14 road and building a guided busway along the old Cambridge and Huntingdon railway, which had been closed to passengers since 1970 and to all traffic since 1993. Since closure there had been proposals to reinstate the rail service, and for a light railway network, a bus lane, a road with limited access, a bus-way, a cycle path and a nature walk. A local group, CAST.IRON, was set up in July 2003 after being inspired by the Wensleydale Railway to promote and undertake reinstatement of the route for trains and to resist other proposals, referring to the guided bus as the 'misguided bus'. A private consortium that had proposed a guided bus scheme, SuperCAM, abandoned their plans in 2003. Arup prepared the Transport and Works Act (TWA) application presented in late 2003.

A public inquiry was held in September–October 2004. The scheme was supported by five bus and coach operators, and 20 other organisations and individuals. A total of 2,735 objections were received: from local councils, public bodies, transport interests, local pressure groups and individuals who criticised the Environmental Impact Assessment, supported the rail alternative or objected to the scheme in principle. The scheme was approved by the Government in December 2005 by the granting of a Transport and Works Act Order.

=== Construction ===
In March 2007, the then Transport Secretary Douglas Alexander officially opened a manufacturing plant at Longstanton that would produce the 6,000–7,000 concrete beams for the busway. Each beam was 350 millimetres (13¾ inches) thick with a further 180-millimetre (7.1 in) lip for the glide wheels to press against. A total of 50,000 tonnes of concrete was cast to a precision of plus or minus one millimetre (1/25 inch). Supports below the beams were under-pinned by 2,150 piles along a 2.5 miles (4 km) length of the busway.

In the same year a viaduct of maintenance-free steel was built over the River Great Ouse as a replacement for the 200-tonne wrought-iron railway viaduct removed in 2007. There would later be a dispute between the Conservative-controlled County Council and opposition Liberal Democrat councillors as to whether the structure was structurally sound, with a claim that water draining off the track over the viaduct could lead to crumbling.

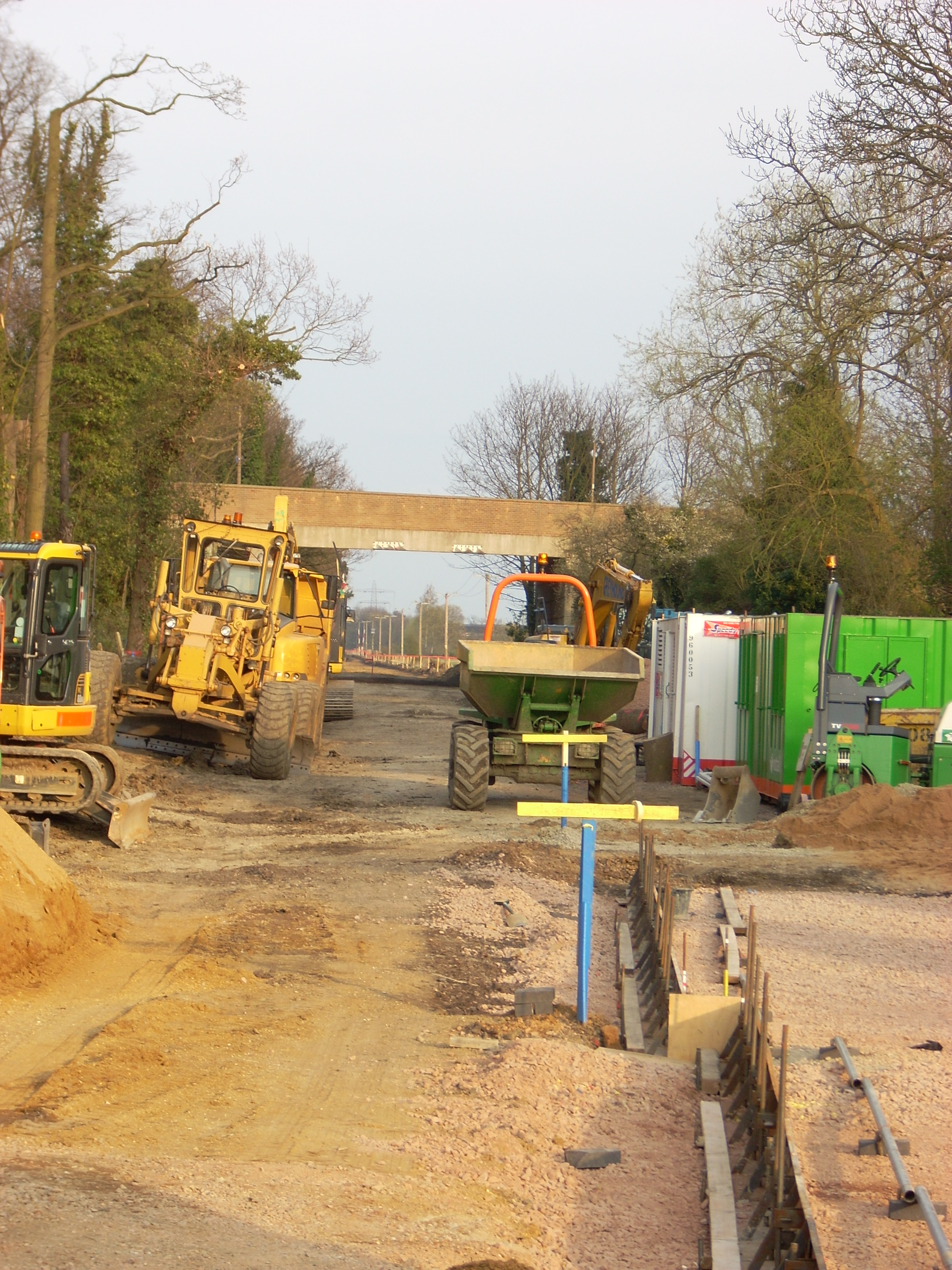
Construction work under way near Histon, Cambridgeshire in 2008.

In March 2008, existing guided vehicles were trialled along a section near Oakington. The vehicles tested included a Wrightbus-bodied single-decker owned by FirstGroup, a Plaxton President-bodied Dennis Trident 2 double-decker from Lothian Buses, and a white Alexander Dennis Enviro500 triple-axled double-decker. The test vehicles were fitted with sensors to assess vibration levels and ride quality. Hot weather testing of the track took place in May/June 2010.

In addition to the bus fleet, Cambridgeshire County Council trialled and purchased a specially adapted "guided gritter" lorry for use during periods of cold weather, which will spray salt water rather than rock salt. In November 2011 this was augmented with a customised "Multihog" gritter/snowplough vehicle from Ireland designed for clearing the accompanying maintenance track and cycleway. The Multihog is powered by 90-horsepower engine allowing it to travel at up to 25 mph (40 km/h) and features a brine tank, rather than solid grit.

By August 2008, approximately 6 miles (10 km) of the busway had been constructed, between Longstanton and Milton Road (Science Park). On 30 November 2009, road signs directing traffic from the A14 towards the future busway park and ride sites started to be installed. Other signage related to the busway had required subsequent height adjustments, and spelling corrections. Trees had also blown over, blocking the busway route near Swavesey. The twelve junctions on the route fitted with bus priority traffic signals were tested on 16 December 2010 and worked as expected.

=== Delays ===
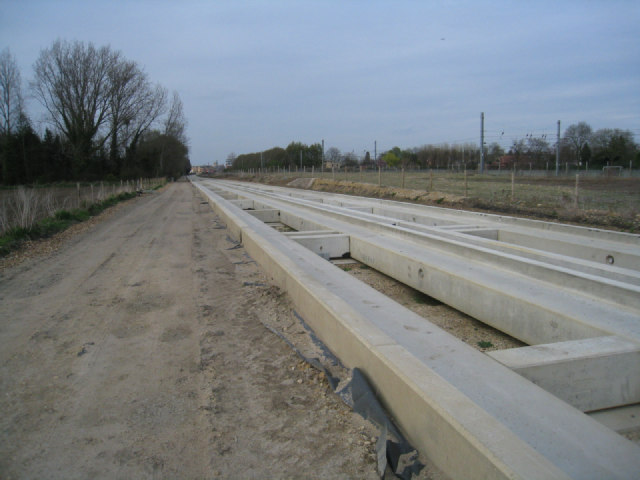
Concrete beam construction of the main busway route. An estimated 6,000 to 7,000 concrete beams were made for the busway.

In January 2009 it was announced that the scheduled opening of the scheme had been delayed until late summer 2009 owing to bad weather and flooding in the Fen Drayton area. As a result of complications with a bridge at Hills Road in Cambridge, traffic restrictions there continued throughout the summer of 2009. Flooding and drainage issues affected the limestone-covered cycleway in late 2009 and early 2010.

In August 2009 a further delay until late November 2009 was announced for the opening of the northern section, with no date given for the southern section.

On 16 November 2009 the project was delayed for the third time when Cambridgeshire County Council announced that the northern section would not open on the previously advertised date of 29 November 2009. An opening date of "the end of the year" 2009 for the northern section was announced later in the same month, followed four days later by "hopefully in the new year [2010]". Initial busway services would only reach Huntingdon railway station and not serve Hinchingbrooke Hospital as had originally been promoted during the public inquiry; neither would they continue southwards to Cambridge railway station.

In January 2010, the contractors and Cambridgeshire County Council were still in discussions about what required finishing. In February 2010, the directors of both the signed-up bus operators—Andy Campbell of Stagecoach in Cambridge, and Peter Lee of Whippet coaches—expressed their companies' frustrations at the busway not being usable by the new buses they had bought to run on it. Shortly afterwards Stagecoach altered the slogan displayed on their fleet of buses for the busway, changing it from reading "I'll be on the busway soon, will you?" to a new slogan of "Will I be on the busway soon?". In the same month, South Cambridgeshire District Council demanded of Cambridgeshire County Council a comprehensive public statement giving clarity over rising costs. In mid-June 2010, none of the listed outstanding issues had been fixed and a public review was announced.

At the start of July 2010, it was reported that neither section would open before 2011; the bus operators reacted to the news angrily, suggesting that they might seek to reduce the minimum level of service that had been previously committed to. At a council meeting on 9 July 2010, a decision was taken to concentrate on completion of the southern section in order to get the whole route opened, rather than aiming for a phased introduction. In late September 2010, BAM Nuttall missed deadlines for providing construction certificates needed by the Council, forcing it to begin its own inspections.

=== Trials ===
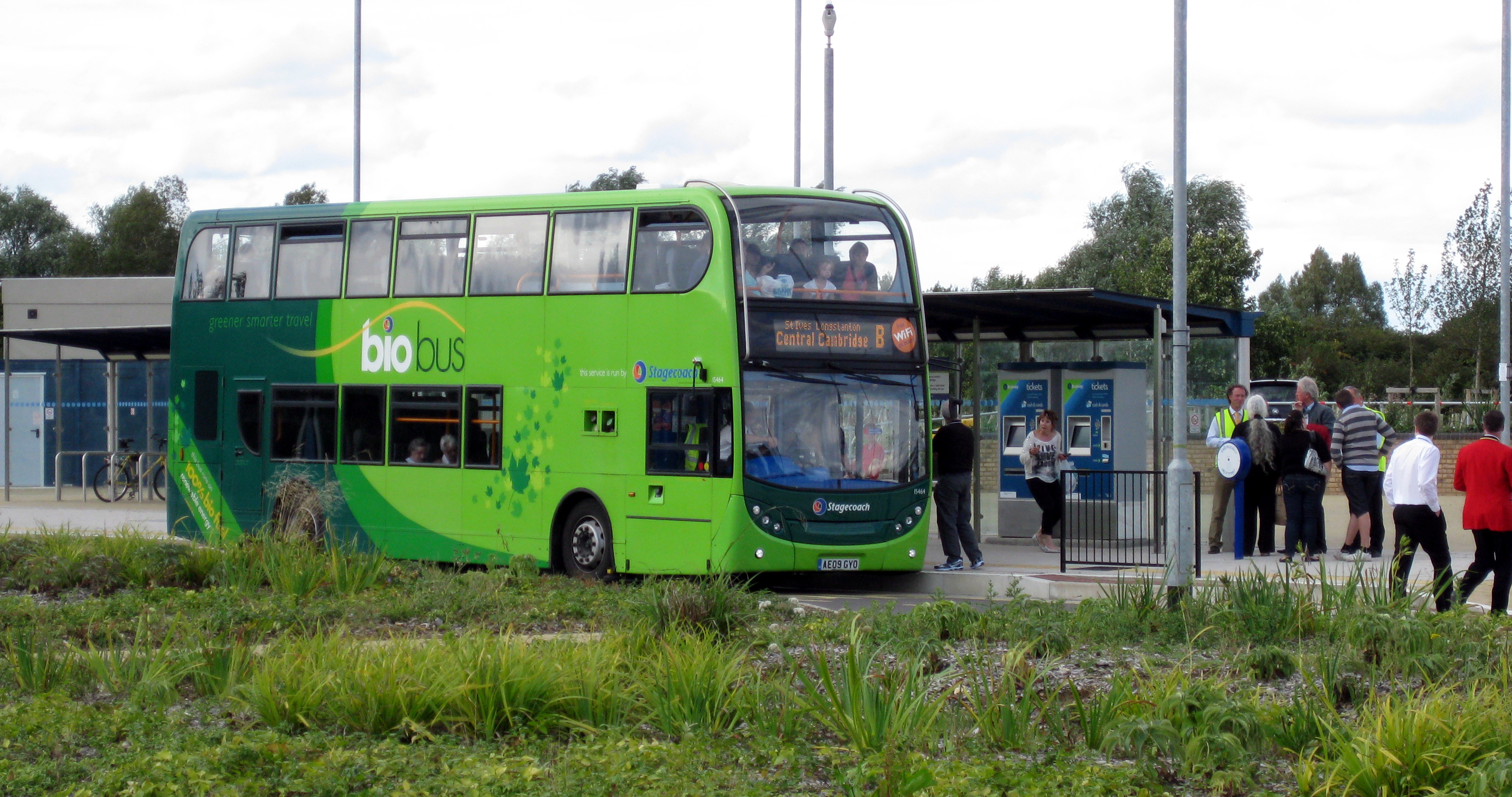
A Stagecoach Route B bus prepares to depart from St Ives to Cambridge on the launch day 7 August 2011.

On 21 April 2011, the busway was officially handed over to Cambridgeshire County Council, triggering a 28-day period for any remedial works be undertaken by BAM Nuttall. This period expired without BAM Nuttall having completed any of the required work. The County Council contracted Jackson Civil Engineering to finish the busway, at BAM Nuttall's expense, with a view to opening the busway in August 2011. The County Council served a legal notice on BAM Nuttall that they were not willing to pay for the budget overrun.

A number of preview trials of the busway were held, during which some problems were encountered, particularly with cyclists using the busway. In one incident a cyclist cycling on the guide beams, rather than the cycle path next to the busway, was struck by a bus. Trials of recovery procedures should a bus break down were also held, with the test finding that a stranded bus could be connected up and removed within five to ten minutes of a specially-adapted breakdown vehicle reaching the scene. During one preview journey held for journalists on 28 July 2011, Hugh Morris of the Cambridge First newspaper staged a race between the guided bus and a car travelling from Cambridge to St Ives to see which was quicker to reach the end of the track. The car beat the bus by ten minutes, although he noted that the trip had not been held during rush hour, during which the A14 road is noted for congestion. A journey from St Ives to the Cambridge Science Park was found to take 20 minutes.

=== Operation ===
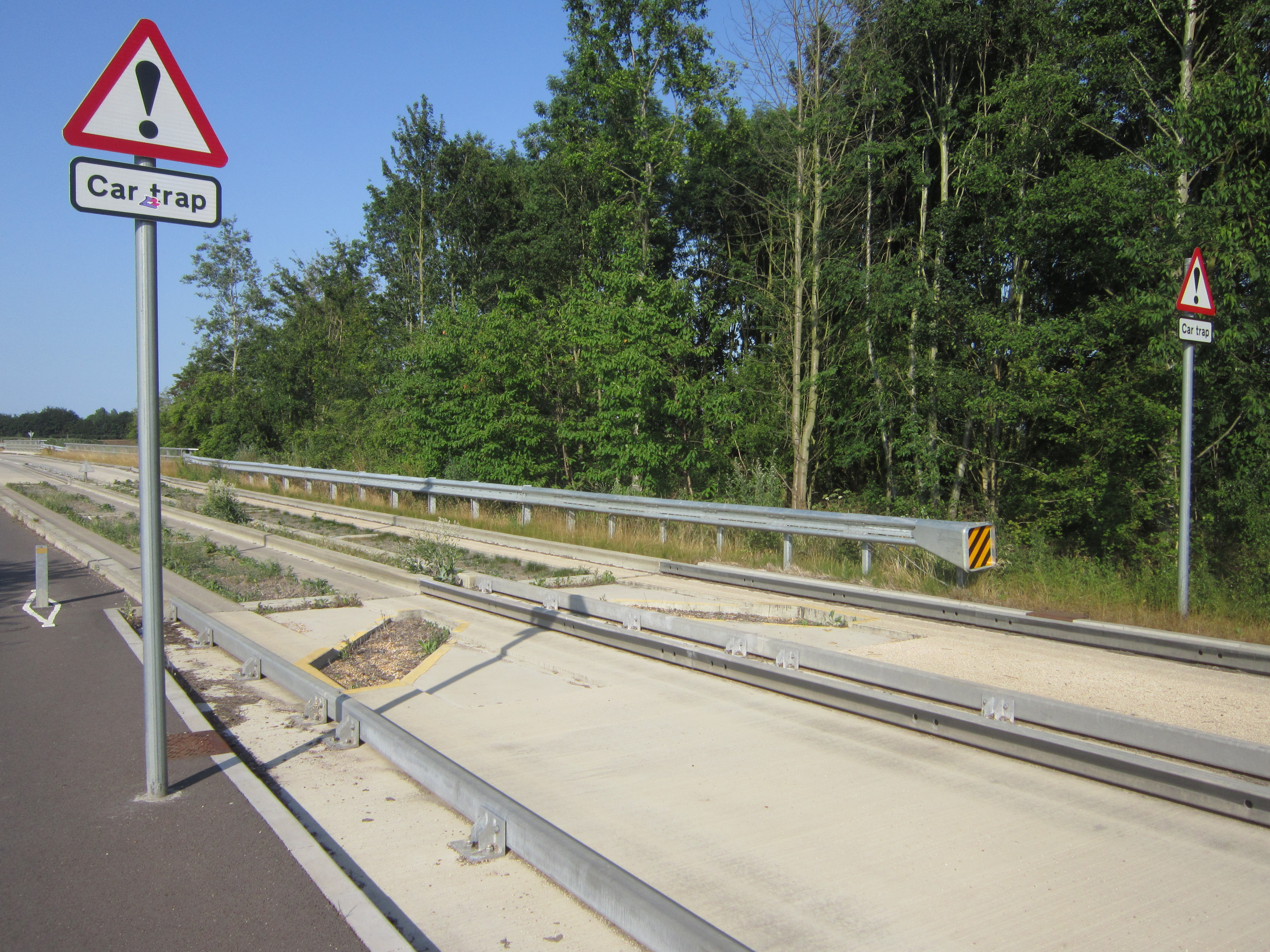
Car traps

The busway and cycle track officially opened to the public on 7 August 2011. The first guided bus left St Ives at 09:00 after the busway had been opened by Andrew Lansley MP. In the first seven days, 55,895 trips were made, leading to the operators providing additional buses on their services. Over the first four weeks the average was 52,227 journeys (224,054 total). Footfall and trade at businesses in the villages increased as a result, with the same increase reported by market traders and shopkeepers in St Ives. As a bridleway, horse riders can also use the maintenance track adjacent to the northern guided section providing a traffic-free route between the villages.

Work began at the end of July 2011 on improving the park and ride facilities at Longstanton. Construction work included a £430,000 passenger waiting room and exhibition centre, for the adjacent Northstowe development. The co-building subsequently won an award at the 2012 Green Apple Built Environment and Architectural Heritage Awards. On 12 January 2012, the busway celebrated its one millionth passenger.

The intersections of the busway with the regular roads are equipped with prominently signed "car traps" to prevent motorists driving onto the guide beams and interfering with the bus traffic.

=== Expansion ===
An extension of the busway, to meet the new Cambridge North railway station, was started in July 2014. The authority already had the necessary powers to build the extension. Originally scheduled to be open in December 2015, the railway station linked to the busway opened on May 2017.

== Construction costs ==
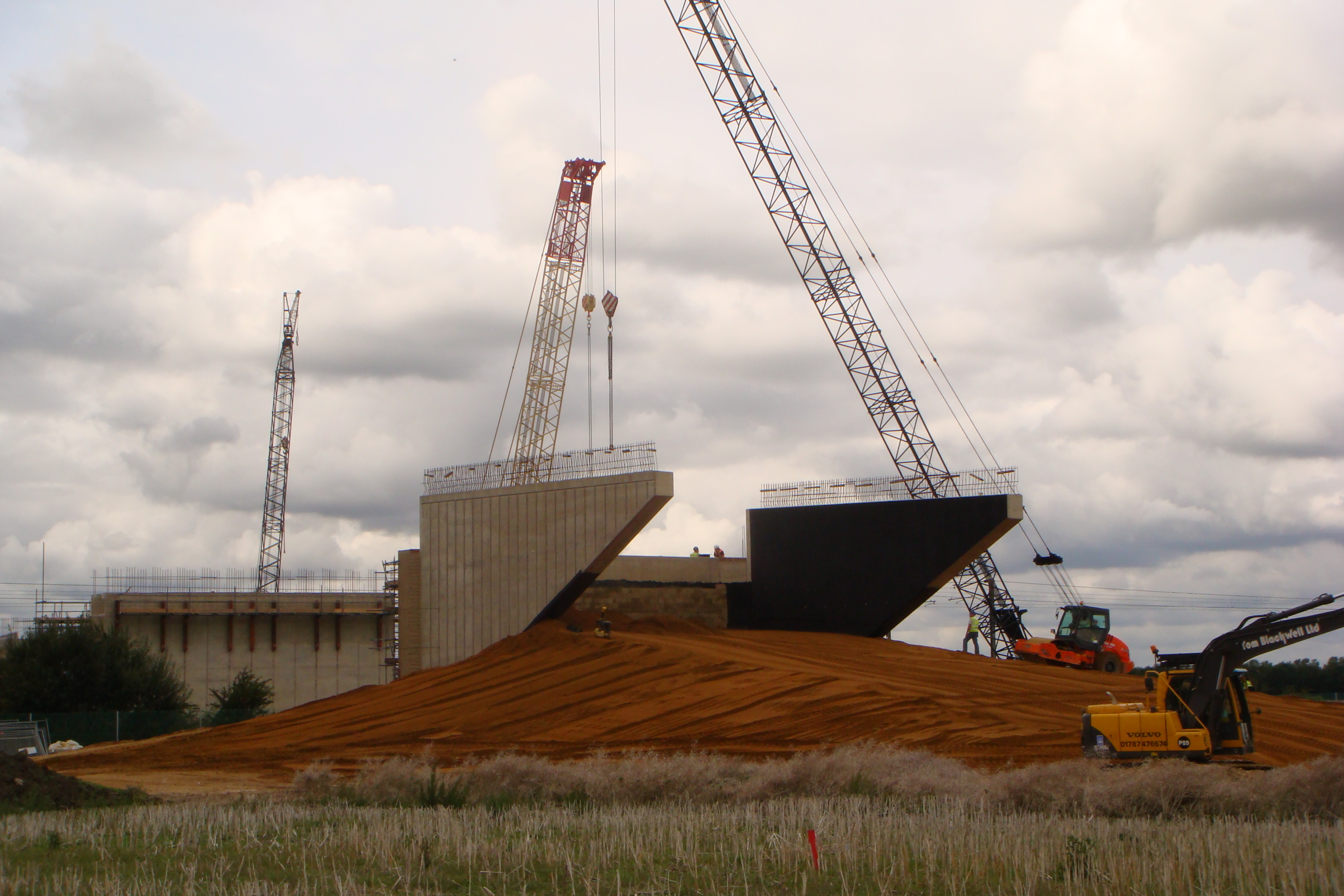
Construction of the bridge over the railway line near Addenbrooke's Hospital, September 2008.

The project was budgeted to cost £116.2 million, with central government providing £92.5 million. Cost-benefit analysis of the scheme had variously assessed the expected ratio as 4.84, 2.28 (1998 prices) and 1.968, (a higher ratio is better), with the cost rising from an initial estimate of £54 million. On December 2008, the County Council assessed the financial risks of the project as "high"; None of the £12.7 million funding—out of £23.7 million—due to come from property developers had been received by the promoters. On November 2009, the backers of the "cb1" redevelopment scheme around Cambridge railway station frontage, Ashwell Property Group, had been due to make their £927,000 contribution towards the busway scheme, but were given permission to defer, and entered administration in December 2009. The taxpayer was expected to have to make up any funding shortfall. Cambridgeshire County Council announced it was budgeting £1 million per year to cover potential ongoing costs associated with the busway, through the reorganisation of other transport related budgets.

Repayments for the loans and associated interest would then be recovered from the contractors and future housing developers after the scheme had been completed. Contributions from developers were also used to pay for artworks and time capsules along the route.

=== BAM Nuttall dispute ===
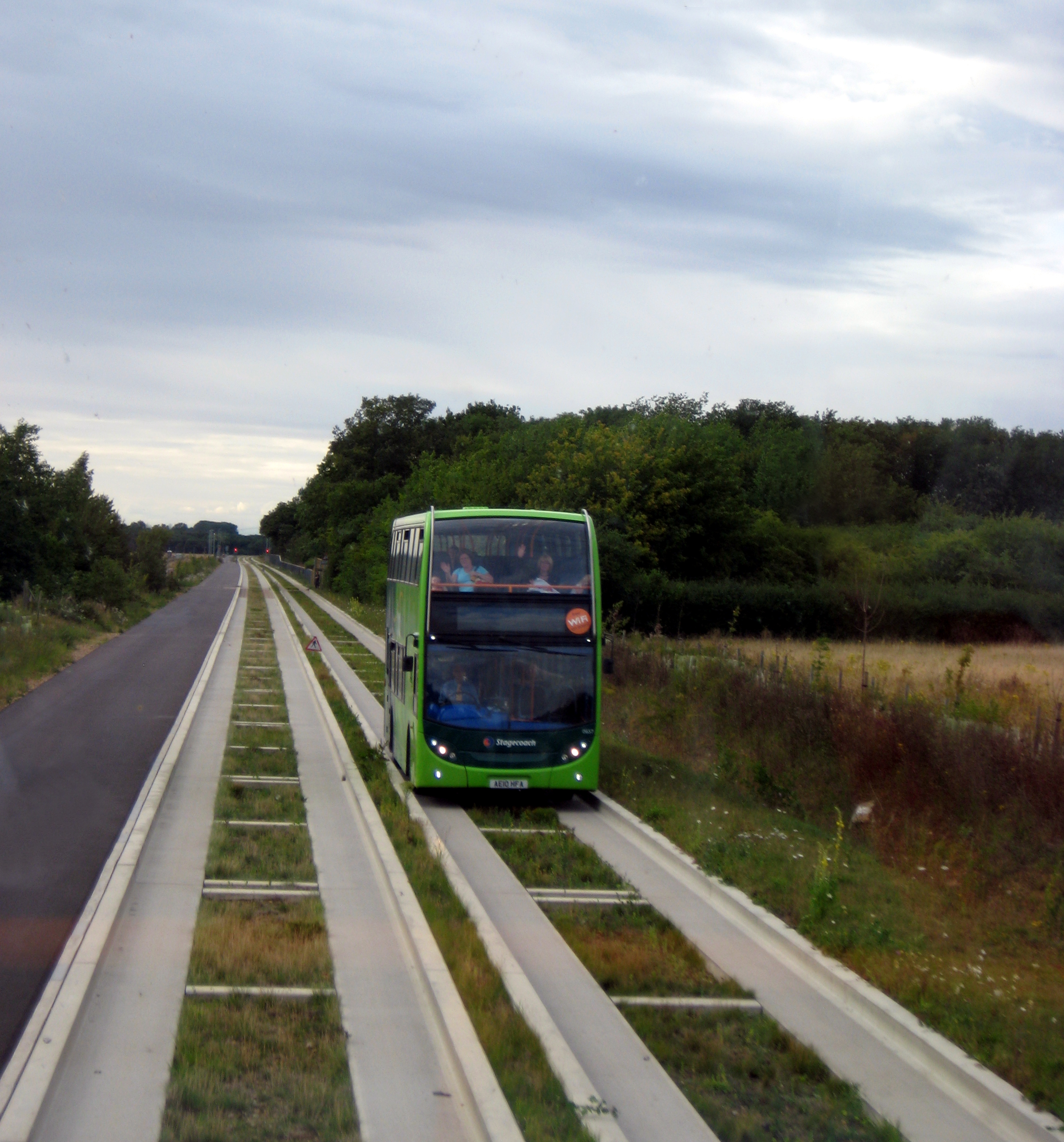
The busway between Oakington and Longstanton. The cycle path is visible on the left of the image.

In 2008, BAM Nuttall claimed that it would cost more than the original budgeted amount to finish the work, perhaps £6 million more. Another report suggests that the overrun could be £30 million on a construction cost of £90 million. Cambridgeshire County Council stated that it had been confident that the scheme would come in on budget because of the terms of its contract with BAM Nuttall. By December 2009, the project had been forecasted to be £1.3 million over budget, the Council's extra liabilities being limited to £5 million over the originally agreed price—with the right to impose penalties upon the contractors for late delivery; since February 2009, the contractors had been amassing a fine of £14,000 per day for late delivery, amounting to £6 million by June 2010 and estimated in December 2010 to be £9 million. On 29 January 2010, Cambridgeshire County Council's head of audit and risk management stated that uncertainty over the final construction price had been causing cash flow issues for the council.

The County Council's performance bond with BAM Nuttall was limited to £7.5 million, plus a further "unlimited guarantee" from Koninklijke BAM Groep, BAM Nuttall's parent company based in The Netherlands.

The original price for the engineering works conducted by BAM Nuttall had been £88 million, and estimates in mid-February 2010 projected costs to have increased to £120 to 140 million. The main issue was structural repairs necessary to the new Great Ouse Viaduct to prevent water ingress. Later that month, Cambridgeshire County Council stated that the council was due to borrow £41 million in 2010 and then £10.2 million the year after, payable to BAM Nuttall in order to complete the project.

Cambridgeshire County Council brought in Atkins as consultants to manage the project. Following the delivery delays, Atkins' bill increased from an expected £2.9 million to £9.6 million. The cost of this would be offset by the £10.8-million fine imposed on BAM Nuttall over the same time-period.

A court date of January 2014 was scheduled for proceedings to begin at the Technology and Construction Court in London. Cambridgeshire County Council stated that it had set aside £6.5 million for legal costs for pursuing the £60 million claim against BAM Nuttall. In May 2012 BAM Nuttall launched a £43-million counterclaim. On 30 August 2013, Cambridgeshire County Council announced that it had reached an out of court settlement with BAM Nuttall, paying them £84.7 million, up from the £83.9 million original fee. Legal costs and other charges would set the total cost at £152 million, £26 million of which would have to come from the Council budget.

== Future proposals ==
In October 2017 tests began with a ten-seater driverless micro bus running on the grade-separated section from Cambridge railway station to Trumpington Park and Ride. Further expansions to the busway itself have been proposed.

=== Cambourne and West Cambridge ===
In March 2019, the Greater Cambridge Partnership consulted on a new busway to the west from Grange Road.

=== Newmarket Road ===
In May 2012, proposals were published by the council to provide segregated bus lanes or an extended bus guideway down the central reservation of Newmarket Road, Cambridge, between Cambridge United Football Club's Abbey Stadium and East Road, Cambridge.

=== Other proposals ===
In connection with the Chesterton diversion, the CamLink consortium have proposed a busway from the centre of Cambridge, past Cambridge North station to Waterbeach. CamLink is a proposal developed by RLW Estates which is a consortium of The Royal London Group, Turnstone Estates and St John's College.

CamToo, a transport scheme developed by a separate set of local interest groups, has also offered proposals for further expansion of the guided busway network including:

- Extending the service to operate to Peterborough
- Extension beyond the Milton Road junction, crossing Milton Road to Barnwell Bridge, continuing along the railway alignment already used
- New access routes to and from the A14 road to enable buses from Bar Hill and Cambourne to access the northern section of the busway and its bridge under the A14 road.
- A new bridge under the A14 dual carriageway to enable buses serving Milton, including a new Park and Ride site, to avoid the busy Milton Road / A14 roundabout.
- Conversion of bus lanes on Newmarket Road to "tramway" style (bus lanes moved into the centre of the road with right turns across the bus lanes prohibited for normal traffic).
- Extension beyond Addenbrooke's Hospital, connecting to the A1303 Babraham Road
- Extension beyond Trumpington Park and Ride along the course of the old Bedford railway line to the B1046 between Barton and Comberton.

In February 2012 a proposal was reported from the Campaign for Better Transport to construct an additional Park & Ride facility at Brampton Racecourse to the north-west of Huntingdon.

== Incidents ==
=== Vehicle incursions ===
In the six months until January 2013, a total of 20 drivers of cars had attempted to drive onto the busway; 18 of these happened at the start of the busway in St Ives at the junction with Harrison Way and the other incidents occurred at various junctions in Cambridge. On 5 April 2013, a lorry driver accidentally drove along the busway after following directions given by satellite navigation. A spokesman for the truck operator concluded that the driver had "relied too heavily on his sat-nav". No damage was caused to the busway and no one was injured. The council warned that the company could be fined if it happened again. On 7 February 2019, a lorry became stuck on the busway near Swavesey after entering at Longstanton.

=== Injuries and deaths ===
Three people have been killed since the busway opened in 2011. A pedestrian was struck and killed as she tried to cross the busway in the dark near to the Fen Drayton Lakes stop on 17 November 2015. An inquest into the incident concluded in July 2019, recommending the installation of lighting at the stop. About 2/3 mile (1 km) south of Cambridge railway station, a tourist was hit by the wing mirror of a passing bus on 11 June 2018 and was taken to hospital with injuries to his leg and shoulders. After this incident, the speed limit in the southern section of the busway was reduced to 30 miles per hour (48 km/h). High bus speeds and crowding around the Cambridge Assessment area had been reported by local councillors before this incident.

On 13 September 2018, a cyclist was struck and killed by a bus on the busway. On 26 October 2021, a woman was struck and killed near the crossing with Long Road. In May 2023, it was announced that Cambridgeshire County Council is to be prosecuted for the three deaths by the Health and Safety Executive.

A permanent protective fence to prevent pedestrian access was installed along the southern section in March 2024.

=== Derailments ===
Buses on the busway have derailed five times. Two derailments, both in the southern section, were blamed on excessive speed, and two more, one on the northern and one on the southern section, were blamed by operators on driver error in judging transitions between different parts of the busway. The most recent derailment was in October 2019 near Longstanton.

=== Other incidents ===
Other incidents have included one bus crashing into the back of another, following the first braking hard due to horses obstructing the busway, a collision between a bus and a delivery van at a level crossing at Longstanton, and a collision between a car and a bus, also at Longstanton, which resulted in a fire. In November 2020 a Stagecoach bus travelling on Route C was deroofed under Hills Road bridge. The incident did not cause any serious injury but caused substantial damage to the bus which was under one year old. The alarm-bell wire over the busway, which had been heavily damaged for many years, was replaced in mid 2021. On the same day that Cambridgeshire County Council was fined £6 million over safety failures, a fire engine and two guided buses were involved in a collision.

== Prosecution and safety improvements ==
=== Prosecution ===
On 16 April 2025, Cambridgeshire County Council was fined £6 million plus £292,460.90 in costs after pleading guilty to two offences under the Health and Safety at Work etc. Act 1974. The Health and Safety Executive investigation found that the first risk assessment was carried out in August 2016, one year after the first fatality in 2015, and that simple safety measures were not in place, such as lighting at crossing points, appropriate bus speed limits, measures to separate pedestrians and cyclists from passing buses, and signage warning of dangers.

During the Health and Safety Executive investigation, two improvement notices were served on Cambridgeshire County Council of which the HSE principal inspector said "They chose to appeal our enforcement action instead of acting on our concerns and incidents continued to happen."

The council's Chief Executive acknowledged the failings, apologised and has taken action to improve safety with frequent inspections, a rolling programme of risk assessment and improved incident recording, reporting and investigation.

=== Safety works ===
In June 2025, planning permission was granted to Cambridge County Council to install safety fencing along the entire length of the Busway (including the trial section between Cambridge Biomedical Campus and Cambridge Railway Station) to fulfill their promise of improving safety on the Busway as a result of prosecution in April 2025. In addition to this, temporary speed restrictions are in place on the Busway to improve safety until the works are completed - 30mph along the main sections of the track and 20mph in crossings and stop areas. This, alongside track closures to install such fencing, contributes to an addition of up to 40 minutes to journey times, with the works expected to be completed by January 1 2028.

There have also been a number of signage updates to the path that runs alongside the Busway track - including "15" red-bordered circular speed limit signs painted onto the ground, and detailed warning signs that set out safety measures cyclists and walkers should take during both night and day, such as wearing reflective clothing and for cyclists to keep below 15mph.

== See also ==
- Other busway systems
- Cambridgeshire Autonomous Metro
