= Orchard Park, Cambridgeshire =

Civil parish in Cambridgeshire, England

Coordinates: 52.233°N 0.119°E

Orchard Park
- Location within Cambridgeshire
- Civil parish: Orchard Park
- District: South Cambridgeshire
- Shire county: Cambridgeshire
- Region: East
- Country: England
- Sovereign state: United Kingdom
- Post town: CAMBRIDGE
- Postcode district: CB4
- Dialling code: 01223
- Police: Cambridgeshire
- Fire: Cambridgeshire
- Ambulance: East of England
- UK Parliament: South East Cambridgeshire

Orchard Park, previously known as Arbury Park, is a district and civil parish of South Cambridgeshire, England, contiguous with the city of Cambridge. Previously agricultural land and the site of Premier Park, a huge estate for Premier Travel, which, amongst other things, was a main National Express operator with housing for its drivers. The area is currently an extensive housing estate with additional development continuing on adjacent land.

== History ==
The area now called Orchard Park has been settled since at least the Bronze Age and remnants of the Iron Age ring fort, Arbury Camp, remain. The area was also occupied during the Roman occupation of Britain.

By the beginning of the 21st century the area was mostly used for agriculture before it was identified by local government for development. Building started in 2006 and was due to be completed around 2009, but had been suspended from September 2008 till June 2009 when building restarted. The development contains a number of newly built houses and flats — mixed social and private dwellings. It has been proposed that under current boundary change proposals Orchard Park should fall within Cambridge City Council's boundaries in the future.

== Education ==
Orchard Park Community Primary School caters for 5–11 year olds. Nearby Cambridge Regional College offers further education.

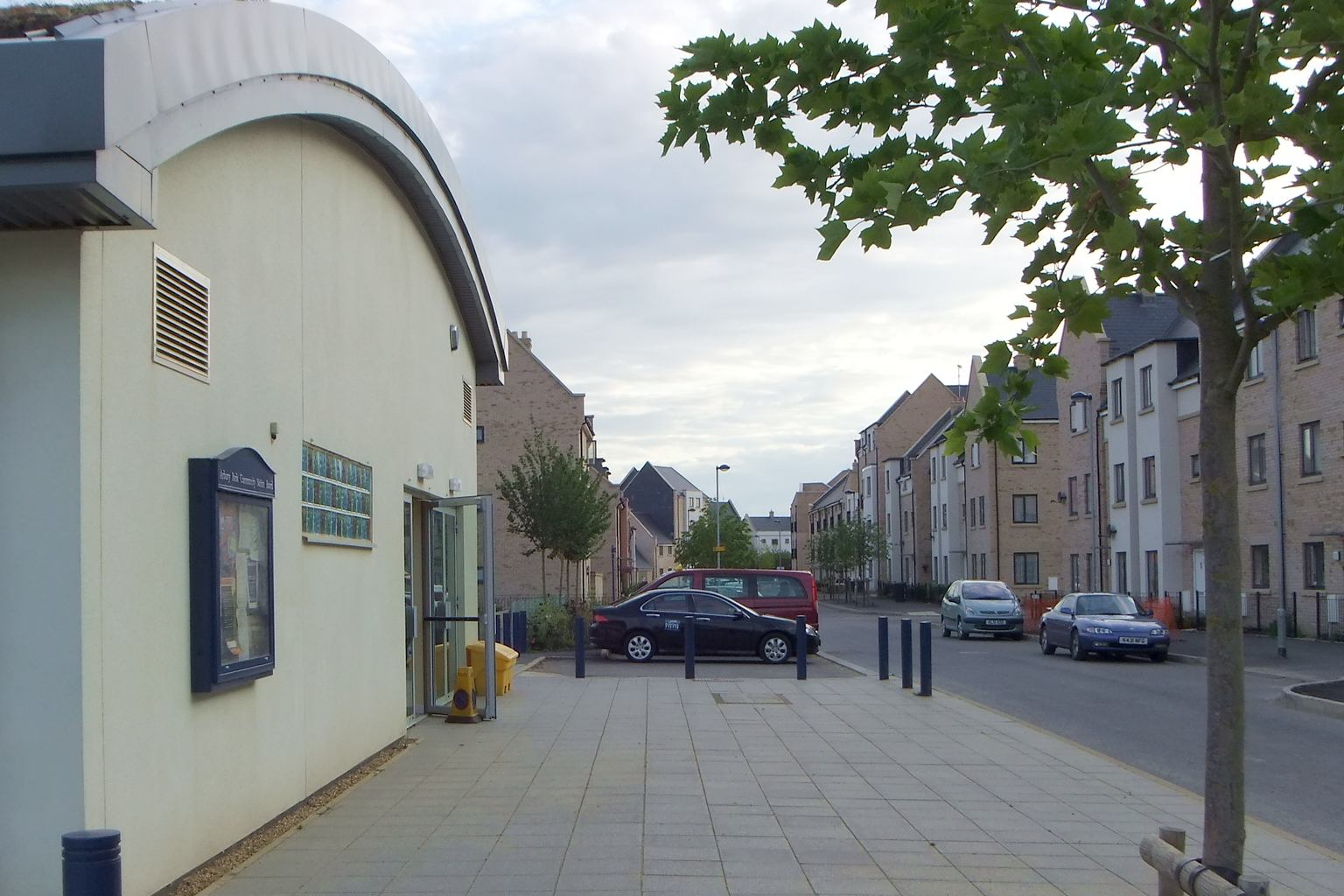
The Orchard Community Centre and houses along Central Avenue.

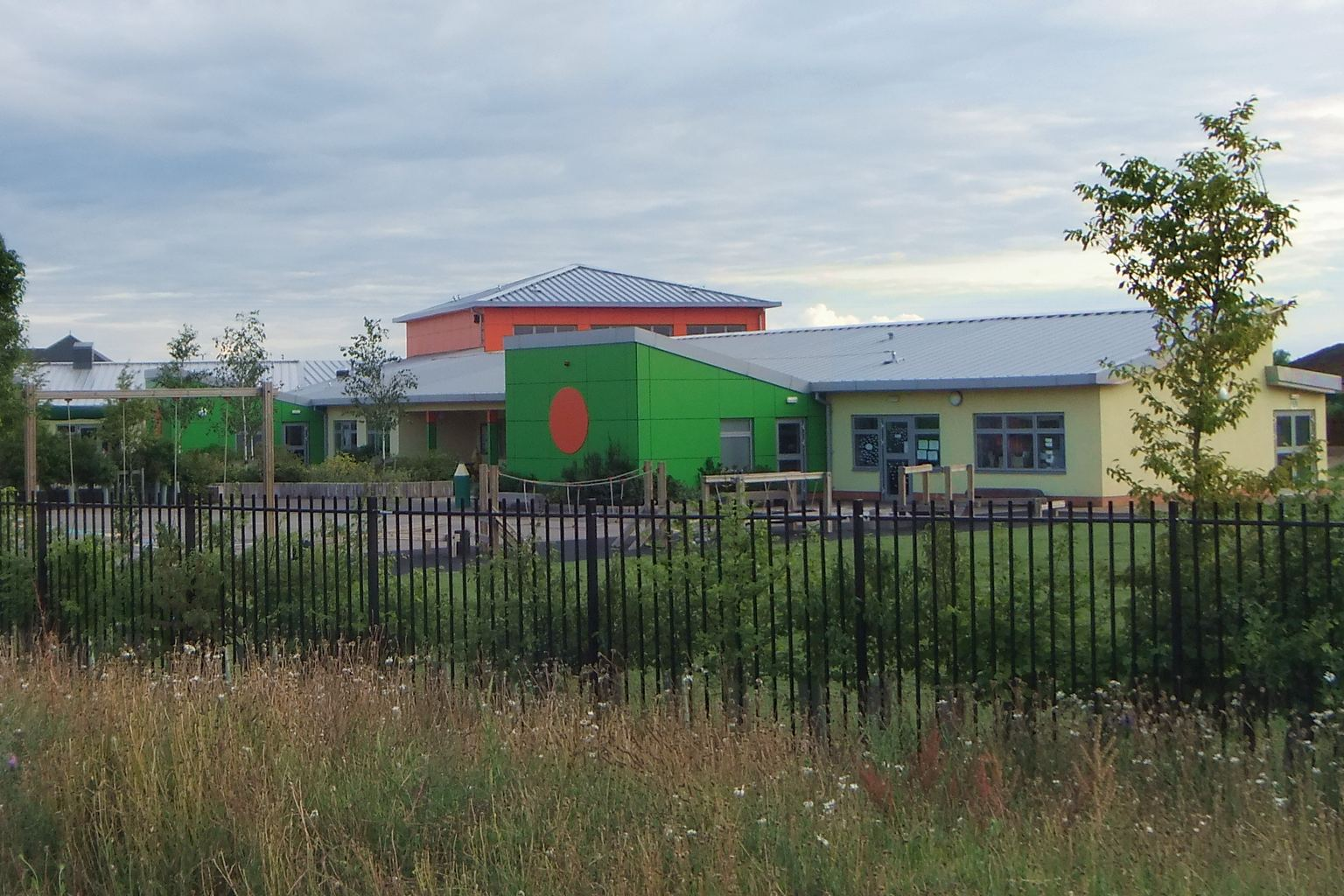
Orchard Park Community Primary School.

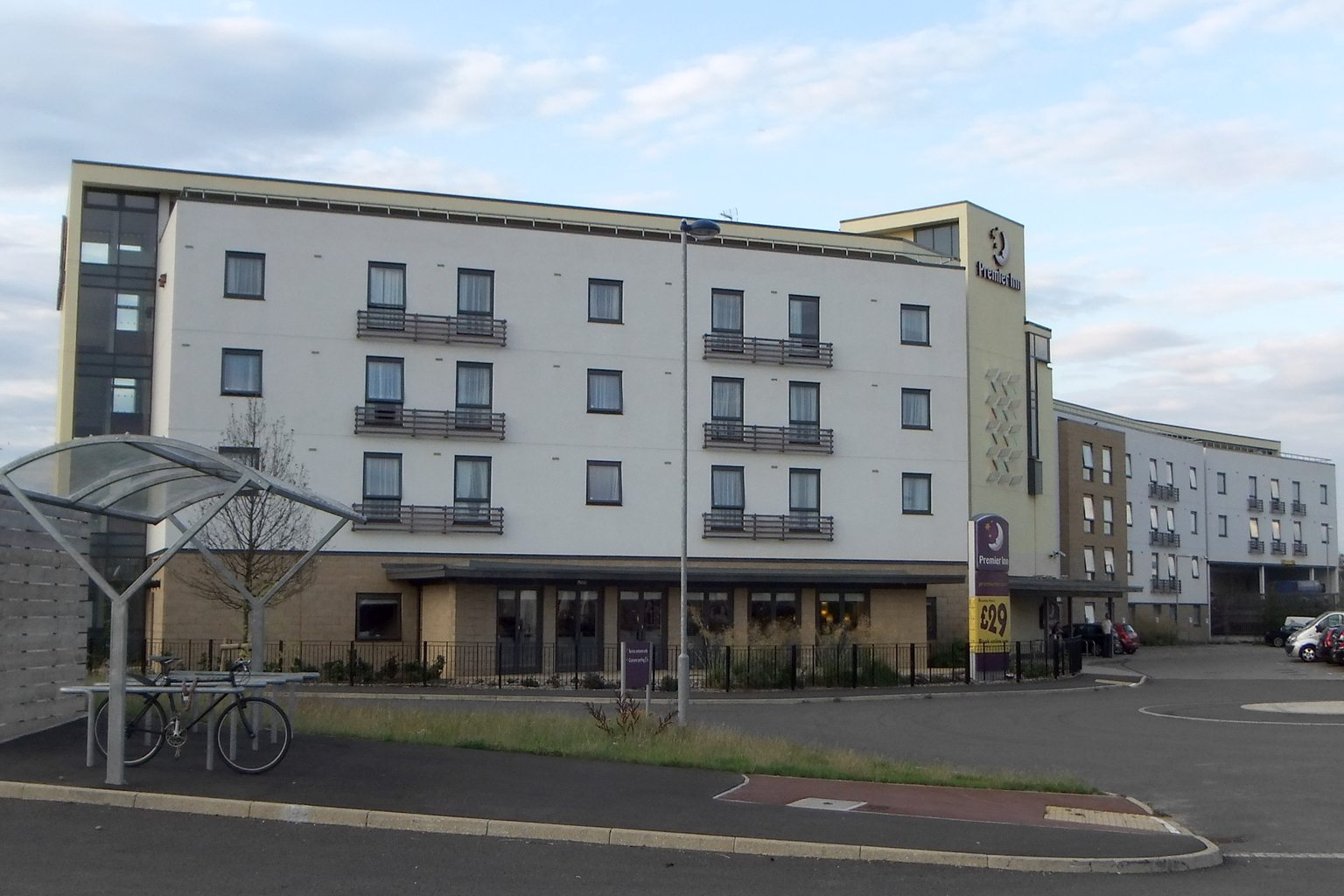
Premier Inn in Orchard Park.

== Transport ==
The area has bus and road connections to the centre of Cambridge as well as the A14 trunk road. Services on the Cambridgeshire Guided Busway began in August 2011 after a lengthy delay. The busway passes the edge of the development with two sheltered bus stops at East and West Orchard Park. A path reducing the travelling distance for pedestrians and cyclists to Histon has been proposed, to reduce Orchard Park resident's dependency on motorised transport. The Ring Fort Path proposal would close the gap between the local hotel and school and the pedestrian crossing over the A14 to Histon. The area is 2 miles from Cambridge North Station Cambridge North railway station and 3 miles from Cambridge Central Station.

== Nearby communities ==
- King's Hedges
- Arbury
- Impington
- Chesterton
