= Akeman Street (Cambridgeshire) =

Roman road in eastern England

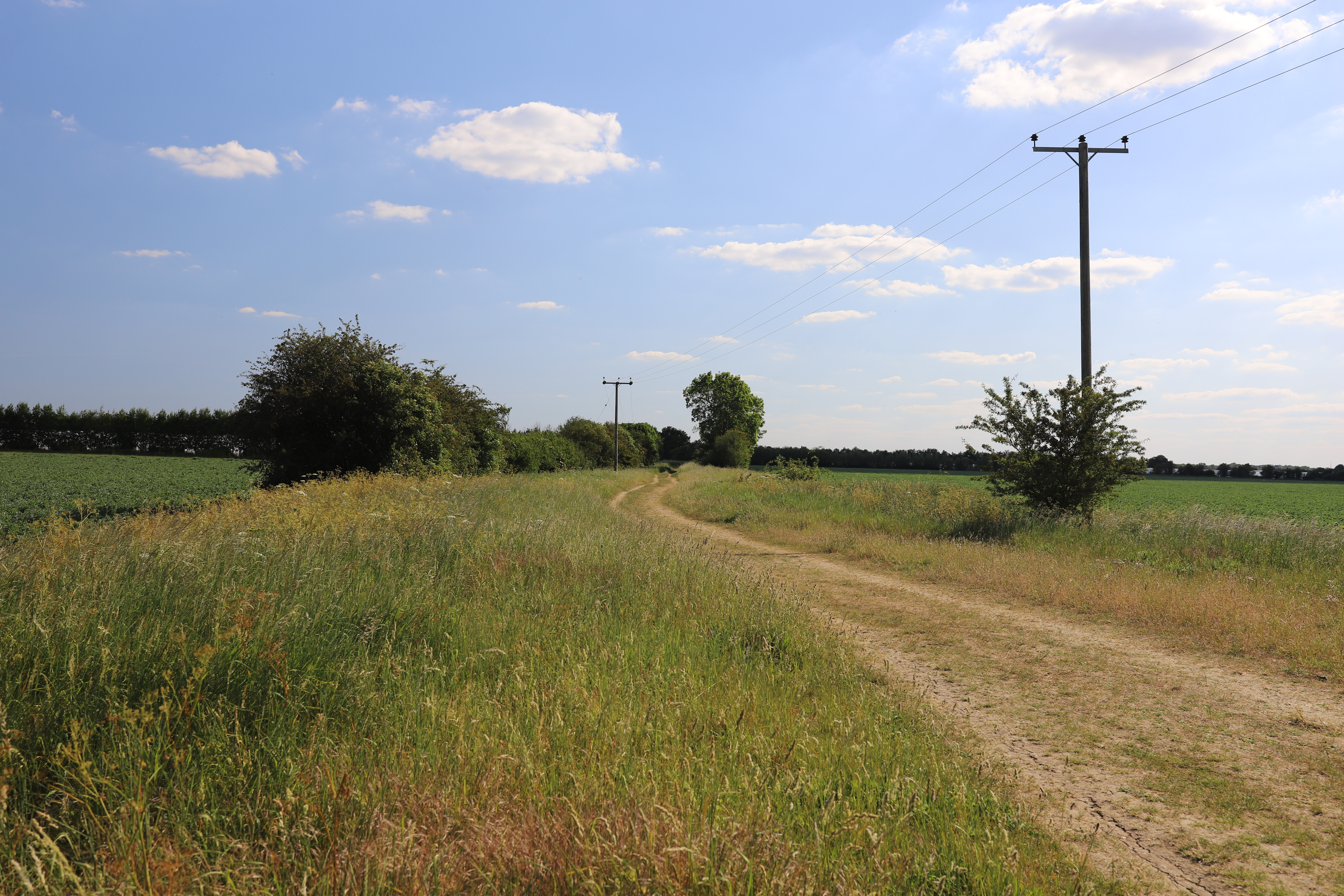
Akeman Street near Landbeach, Cambridgeshire

Akeman Street is a Roman road in eastern England that runs from Cambridgeshire to the north coast of Norfolk. It is approximately 75 miles (120 km) long and runs roughly north-northeast.

Akeman Street joined Ermine Street near Wimpole Hall, then ran northeast to the settlement at Durolipons (now Cambridge), where it crossed a Roman road now known as the Via Devana. Within north Cambridge, the road followed the present-day Stretten Avenue, Carlton Way and Mere Way running northeast past Landbeach before joining the present A10 and on towards Ely and The Fens. It then reached Denver and the coast at Brancaster.

The road was constructed on top of an earlier trackway some time in the 2nd Century AD, or later, and it has been speculated that it was part of the creation of an imperial estate under Hadrian.

== See also ==
- Akeman Street
- Roman roads in Britain
