= William Cole (antiquary) =

English antiquary (1714–1782)

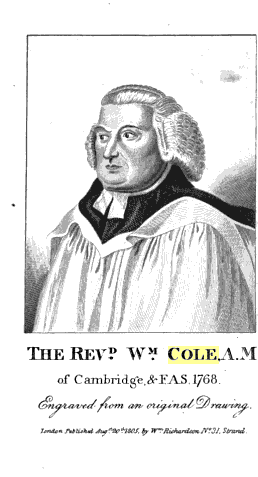
William Cole

William Cole FSA (3 August 1714 – 16 December 1782), was a Cambridgeshire clergyman and antiquary, known for his extensive manuscript collections on the history of Cambridgeshire and of Buckinghamshire.

He published little, but left his manuscript volumes (over 100 of them) to the British Museum, where they have proved invaluable to people writing about the history of Cambridgeshire. He kept a diary between 1765 and 1770, and two volumes – one relating to a trip to France, and one to his time at Bletchley – were published in 1931.

A nineteenth-century biographer described Cole as "one of the most learned men of the eighteenth century in his particular line, and the most industrious antiquary that Cambridgeshire has ever had, or is likely to have", while the verdict of a contemporary, Professor Michael Lort, was "... with all his oddities, he was a worthy and valuable man".

== Early life and education ==
Cole was born at the King's Arms inn, where his father was then publican, in Little Abington, a village near Babraham, Cambridgeshire, on 3 August 1714. He was the son of William Cole of Babraham, a well-to-do farmer, and his third wife (of four), Elizabeth, daughter of Theophilus Tuer, merchant, of Cambridge, and widow of Charles Apthorp. He was descended from a family of respectable yeomen, who had lived for several generations in the part of Cambridgeshire bordering on Essex.

William (the son) received his early education in private schools at Cambridge, Linton, and Saffron Walden. From Saffron Walden he entered Eton College, where he remained for five years on the foundation. His principal friend and companion there – who became a lifelong friend – was Horace Walpole, who even at that early period used to make jocular remarks on his inclination to Roman Catholicism. While still a boy he was in the habit of copying monumental inscriptions, and drawing coats of arms in trick from the windows of churches. On leaving Eton he was admitted a pensioner of Clare College, Cambridge, on 24 January 1733; and in April 1734 he obtained one of the Freeman scholarships in the college.

== Career ==
=== 1735–1753: Cambridgeshire ===
In 1735, on the death of his father, Cole inherited a substantial estate, and found himself with no obligation to earn a living. He entered himself as a fellow-commoner of Clare Hall, and the next year migrated to King's College, where he had a younger brother, then a fellow. (Note: Add. MS 5808, fol. 58) He remained for 18 years at King's, collecting historical information on the county of Cambridgeshire. He visited nearly all the churches in the county, making sketches of them and taking notes of monumental inscriptions and coats of arms (as well as local gossip). He made extensive transcriptions of the registers of the Bishops of Ely, court rolls, registers of wills, and other manuscripts relating to the county.

In April 1736 he travelled for a short time in French Flanders with his half-brother, Dr Stephen Apthorp. In October of the same year he took the degree of B.A. In 1737, in consequence of ill health, he went to Lisbon on his doctor's advice for six months, returning to college in May 1738. He also travelled to Scotland.

In 1739, he was put into the commission of the peace for Cambridgeshire, in which capacity he acted for many years. In 1740 his friend Henry Bromley, 1st Baron Montfort, lord-lieutenant of the county, appointed him one of his deputy lieutenants, and in the same year he commenced M.A.

In 1743, his health being again impaired, he took another trip through Flanders, described in his manuscript collections. During his travels on the continent he formed lasting friendships with Alban Butler and other Catholic ecclesiastics. On Christmas Day 1744 he was ordained deacon, and for some time officiated as curate to Dr Abraham Oakes, rector of Withersfield, Suffolk. In 1745, after being admitted to priest's orders, he was appointed chaplain to Thomas Hay, 7th Earl of Kinnoull, in which office he was continued by the succeeding earl, George. (Note: ib. 5808, f. 73b) He was elected a fellow of the Society of Antiquaries of London in 1747. In 1749 he was living at Haddenham in the Isle of Ely, and on 25 Aug in that year he was admitted to the freedom of the city of Glasgow. (Note: ib. 6402, f. 132)

In the same year he was collated to the rectory of Hornsey, Middlesex, by Bishop Thomas Sherlock. "Sherlock," says Cole, "gave me the rectory of Hornsey, yet his manner was such that I soon resigned it again to him. I had not been educated in episcopal trammels, and liked a more liberal behaviour; yet he was a great man, and I believe an honest man." Cole was inducted on 25 November; but finding that the parsonage-house required rebuilding, and understanding that the bishop insisted upon his being resident, he sent in his resignation within a month. This the bishop refused to accept, because Cole had rendered himself liable for dilapidations and other expenses by being instituted to the benefice. Cole continued, therefore, to hold the rectory till 9 January 1751, when he resigned it in favour of Mr Territ. During this time he never resided, but employed a curate, Matthew Mapletoft.

=== 1753–1767: Buckinghamshire ===
In 1753 Cole quit the university on being presented by his early friend and patron, Browne Willis, to the rectory of Bletchley, Buckinghamshire. He now turned his attention to the history and antiquities of Buckinghamshire.

In 1765 he undertook a lengthy tour in France with Horace Walpole. His aim was to find some quiet and cheap spot, in Normandy or elsewhere, to which he might eventually retire. This scheme of settling permanently in France probably originated in a wish to openly join the Roman Catholic church, for in his manuscripts he takes little or no pains to conceal his Catholic inclinations and his contempt for the English and German reformers. However, he was dissuaded from this plan of self-banishment largely by Walpole, who pointed out that under the droit d'aubaine the king of France would become the possessor of his cherished manuscripts, which even at this date comprised some 40 folio volumes. Cole wrote to Walpole on 17 March 1765:

They are my only delight – they are my wife and children – they have been, in short, my whole employ and amusement for these twenty or thirty years; and though I really and sincerely think the greatest part of them stuff and trash, and deserve no other treatment than the fire, yet the collections which I have made towards an History of Cambridgeshire, the chief points in view of them, with an oblique or transient view of an Athenae Cantabrigienses, will be of singular use to any one who will have more patience and perseverance than I am master of to put the materials together. These therefore I should be much concerned should fall into the hands of the French king's officers.

Moreover, in the course of his travels he was shocked at the tendency towards irreligion in France. (Note: Ellis, Original Letters, 2nd ser., iv. 483.) (Note: Walpole, Letters, ed. Cunningham, iv. 329.) He therefore determined not to make the country his home. His journal of this tour was published in 1931.

=== 1767–1782: return to Cambridgeshire ===
Cole left Bletchley in November 1767, and on Lady Day 1768 he resigned the rectory in favour of Browne Willis's grandson, the Rev. Thomas Willis, because he knew it has been his patron's intention so to bestow the living if he had lived to effect an exchange. Cole now became curate of Waterbeach, five miles from Cambridge, and resumed work on his history of Cambridgeshire. His rented house, little better than a cottage, was very uncomfortable. (Note: Add. MS 5824, fol. 36b.) To make matters worse, he discovered that he had got into a parish which abounded with fanatics of almost all denominations. Writing about this period to his friend Father Charles Bonaventure Bedingfeld, a Minorite friar, he says: "My finances are miserably reduced by quitting the living of Bletchley, and by half my own estate being under water by the breaking of the Bedford River bank at Over after the great snow in February was twelvemonth;" and he proceeds to remark: "Yet I am not disposed to engage myself in any ecclesiastical matters again, except greater should be offered than I am in expectation of. I have already refused two livings, one in Glamorganshire, the other in Oxfordshire; for I have no inclination to the duty and do not love to be confined." He still had a hankering after a semi-monastic life, for he wrote to Bedingfeld on 20 April 1768: "Could I have my books and conveniences about me, I should nowhere like better than to finish my days among my countrymen in a conventual manner," though not, he takes care to explain, as a monk or friar, because he had no religious vocation. (Note: ib. 5824, f. 41b) A second overflow of the Hundred Foot river at Over still further diminished the value of his estate, and on 18 February 1769 he wrote to the Rev. John Allen: "I hardly ever now really enjoy myself for three days together, as the continued wet weather alarms me constantly; so that I am come to a resolution to sell my estate and purchase elsewhere, or buy an annuity." At Michaelmas 1769 he had his first attack of gout, which complaint afterwards caused him severe and frequent suffering.

About May 1770 he left the church and moved from Waterbeach to Milton He rented a small farm from King's College, where he was to stay for the rest of his life, continuing work on his antiquarian studies. He became known as "Cole of Milton," though he was sometimes jokingly spoken of as "Cardinal Cole". In May 1771, by Lord Montfort's favour, he was put into the commission of the peace for the borough of Cambridge. In 1772 Edmund Keene, Bishop of Ely, offered him of the vicarage of Madingley, but he declined it. However, on 10 June 1774 he was instituted by John Green, Bishop of Lincoln, on the presentation of Eton College, to the vicarage of Burnham, Buckinghamshire, vacant through the death of his half-brother, Stephen Apthorp.

== Death ==
Cole continued to live at Milton, where he died, aged 68, on 16 December 1782. His constitution had been shattered by repeated attacks of gout. He was buried in St Clement's Church, Cambridge, under the steeple (now removed), which bore on its front his motto, Deum Cole. On the right hand of the entrance to the church is a monument, with an inscription stating that the steeple was erected with money left by him for the purpose.

== Network ==
Cole numbered among his friends and correspondents some of the most learned men of his time, including Horace Walpole, who called him his "oracle in any antique difficulties", Thomas Gray, Michael Lort, George Steevens, Richard Farmer, William Bennet, John Nichols, Richard Gough, and Alban Butler. Although he published no separate work of his own, he rendered substantial assistance to many authors by supplying them either with entire dissertations or with minute communications or corrections.

He wrote the account of the School of Pythagoras at Cambridge in Francis Grose's Antiquities; and was a major contributor to James Bentham's History of Ely, 1771, writing the lives of the bishops and deans, and the description of the Ely tablet. (Note: Athenae Cantab. B. pt. i. f. 113) (Note: Davis, Olio of Biographical Anecdotes) (Note: the Gentleman's Magazine lxxxiv. pt. ii. pp. 307, 413.) He also made significant contributions to Robert Masters' History of Corpus Christi College. Having a large collection of engraved portraits, he was able to assist James Granger in preparing his Biographical History of England. To Andrew Ducarel he sent a complete list of the chancellors of Ely, and afterwards several hints respecting his Tour in Normandy. To Gough's Anecdotes of British Topography he contributed in 1772 some remarks; as he afterwards did respecting Gough's Sepulchral Monuments; and when the Memoirs of the Gentlemen's Society at Spalding were printed in 1780, he supplied anecdotes of the early members. He was a frequent writer in the Gentleman's Magazine, and he gave John Nichols biographical hints and corrections for A Select Collection of Miscellaneous Poems, Anecdotes of Hogarth and History of Hinckley. He transcribed Browne Willis's History of the Hundreds of Newport and Cotslow in Buckinghamshire, and organised them in ten folio volumes from the originals in four volumes, which Willis had delivered to him a few weeks before his death. Cole's transcript is now in the British Library, while Willis's original copy is preserved, with his collections for the whole county, in the Bodleian Library, Oxford. (Note: Nichols, Lit. Anecdotes, i. 667 n.) His notes on Wood's Athenae Oxonienses are printed in Bliss's edition of that work. Finally he collected all the materials for Horace Walpole's Life of the Cambridge antiquary, Thomas Baker.

== Working methods and prejudices ==
An idea of Cole's industry as a transcriber may be gathered from this passage in a letter to Walpole (12 September 1777): "You will be astonished at the rapidity of my pen when you observe that this folio of four hundred pages [Baker's History of St. John's], with above a hundred coats of arms and other silly ornaments, was completed in six weeks; for I was called off for above a week to another manuscript, which I expected would be demanded of me every day; besides some days of visiting and being visited." Again he remarks in a letter to Allen: "I am wearing my eyes, fingers, and self out in writing for posterity, of whose gratitude I can have no adequate idea, while I neglect my friends, who I know would be glad to hear from me."

As he freely jotted down his inmost thoughts as to the merits or demerits of his acquaintances, he took care that no one, with the exception of two or three intimate friends, should see his manuscripts, either during his lifetime or within twenty years after his death. On the occasion of his sending the History of King's College to Horace Walpole at Strawberry Hill, he wrote (2 March 1777) with reference to his manuscripts:

No person except Dr. Lyne and Mr. John Allen of Trinity College ever looked into them. Indeed, you are the only person that I should think a moment about determining to let them go out of my hands: and, in good truth, they are generally of such a nature as makes them not fit to be seen, for through life I have never artfully disguised my opinions, and as my books were my trusty friends, who have engaged never to speak till twenty years after my departure, I always, without guile, entrusted them with my most secret thoughts, both of men and things; so that there is what the world will call an ample collection of scandalous rubbish heaped together.

As an example of his strong prejudices, and occasionally violent style of expressing them, a passage which he added to his History of King's College only a few months before his death, may be cited:

Here I left off this work in 1752, and never began it again, quitting college that year for the rectory of Blecheley in Buckinghamshire, at the presentation of Browne Willis, esq., and so lost fifteen years of the best part of my life for disquisitions of this sort, and never having a relish to recommence this work when I retired into my native county again in 1767, when I made of an old dilapidated cottage at Milton near Cambridge, a decent gentleman's house, laying out upon the premises at least £600, the annual rent being only £17 per annum, hired of the college, and no lease till my time; yet after six years' occupancy Cooke, the snotty-nosed head of it, soon after his election, had the rascality, with Paddon, a dirty wretch, and bursar suitable to him, to alter my lease, and put new terms in it. But from such a scoundrel, and I am warranted to call him no other, and would call him so to his face the first time I see him, with the addition of a liar and mischief-maker through life, no other than dirty treatment can be expected. I write this 9 June 1782. (Note: Add. MS 5817, fol. 194.)

== Personal life ==
Cole never married. He lived with his manservant Tom Wood, a maidservant, and a number of animals including 2 horses and a pony, a dog called Busy, a cat, and a parrot. He enjoyed entertaining and lived well, which may have contributed to his gout.

== Collections ==
Cole's chief literary monument is the notable collection of manuscripts, extending to nearly 100 folio volumes, in his own handwriting, which are now held by the British Library. He began to form this vast collection while at college, beginning with fifteen volumes, which he kept in a lock-up case in the university library, where he examined every book likely to yield information suitable to his purpose, besides transcribing many manuscript lists and records. The principal interval from this labour was during his residence at Bletchley (1753–67), but even there, with the aid of his own books and those he could borrow from his neighbours, he proceeded with his great undertaking, and on his frequent journeys he added to his topographical collections, illustrating them with neat copies of armorial bearings and rough but faithful drawings of churches and other buildings. At Waterbeach and Milton, where he was within an easy distance of Cambridge, he resumed his labour of love with renewed ardour, and in addition to dry historical matters, he carefully transcribed all his literary correspondence, and minutely chronicled all the anecdotes he heard respecting his contemporaries at the university.

As late as 1778 Cole was perplexed as to the disposal of his manuscripts. "To give them to King's College," he wrote, "would be to throw them into a horsepond", the members of that society being "generally so conceited of their Latin and Greek that all other studies are barbarous". At one time he thought of Eton College and of Emmanuel College, Cambridge, but eventually he resolved to bequeath his collections to the British Museum on condition that they should not be opened until twenty years after his death. Accordingly, they did not become accessible to the public until 1803. Vol. xvii. never reached the Museum; it is conjectured to have contained a History of Queens' College. The multifarious contents of Cole's collections are described in great detail in the Index to the Additional MSS., with those of the Egerton Collection, acquired in the years 1783–1835, London, 1849, folio. There are also three thick volumes of Cole's own indexes in the reading-room of the Museum. (Note: Add. MSS 5799, 5800, 5801.) The most important sections of the manuscripts are:

- Parochial Antiquities of Cambridgeshire, illustrated with drawings of Churches, Monuments, Arms, &c.
- Collections for an Athenae Cantabrigienses, alphabetically arranged, Add. MSS 5862–85, 5954, 5955. These collections, though they have proved very serviceable to biographers, consist for the most part only of references to printed works, and do not contain connected narratives of the lives of Cambridge authors. Some extracts, relating for the most part to persons with whom Cole was personally acquainted, are printed in Samuel Egerton Brydges's Restituta.
- History of King's College, Cambridge, 4 vols, Add. MSS 5814–17.
- Collections relating to the University of Cambridge.
- Extraneous Parochial Antiquities, or an account of various Churches in different Counties in England, with drawings, Add. MSS 5806, 5811, 5836.
- Topographical, Genealogical, and Miscellaneous Collections.
- Parochial Antiquities for the County of Bucks, with drawings, Add. MSS 5821, 5839, 5840.
- Parochial Antiquities for the County of Huntingdon, with drawings, Add. MSS 5837, 5838, 5847.
- Transcript of Baker's History of St. John's College, Cambridge, with additions, Add. MS 5850.
- Literary correspondence, chiefly in Add. MS 5824.

== Portraits ==
A half-sheet print of Cole, from a drawing by Thomas Kerrich, was engraved by Facius. A portrait of him was also published in Malcolm's collection of Letters to Mr. Granger, 1805, and is reproduced in John Nichols' Literary Anecdotes.
