= Thomas Markaunt =

Benefactor of Corpus Christi, Cambridge

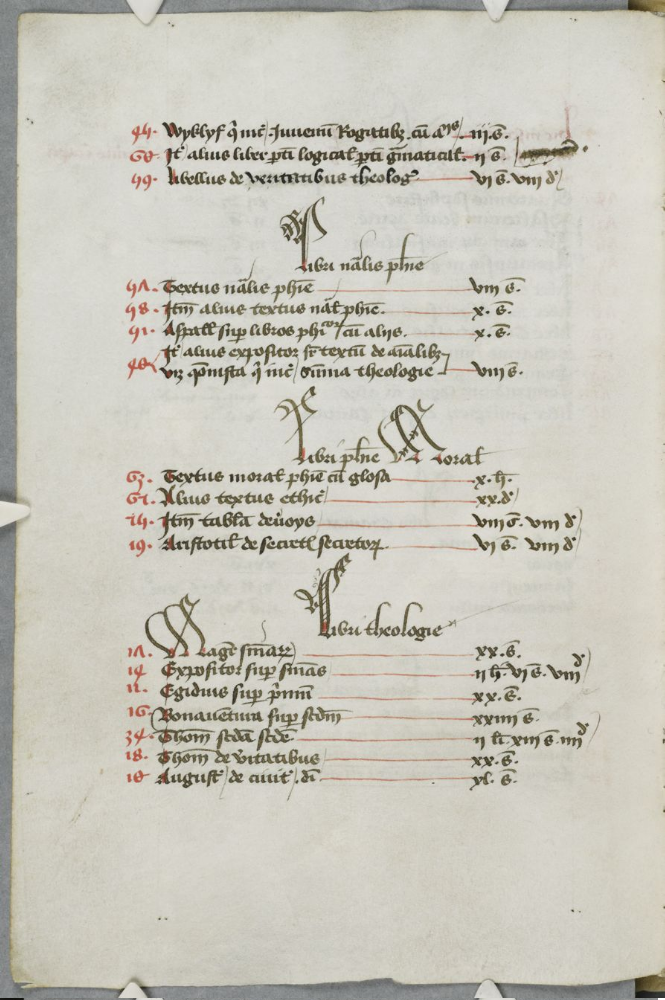
List of Thomas Markaunt's books, with their prices. Corpus Christi College, MS 232

Thomas Markaunt (c. 1382–1439) was a Fellow and benefactor of Corpus Christi College, Cambridge University. He is best known for his sizeable bequest of seventy-five books to Corpus Christi library, which were lent out to the student body in a formal academic system of 'electio'. However he is also of note for his extensive compilation of early University records, known as "Markaunt's book", which gained him a (sometimes disputed) historical reputation as an antiquarian. While the majority of his original bequest has not survived the centuries, the extensive electio records and surviving books have been the subject of much study.

== Biography ==
Thomas Markaunt was born around 1382 to Cassandria and John Markaunt. He first appears in Corpus Christi records in 1413/14, as a magister of the University. Some later historians have asserted Markaunt gained a Bachelor of Theology during his time at Cambridge, but, while his Fellowship at the college required a Catholic priest's holy orders, such a claim is unsubstantiated by contemporary records. Similarly, Thomas Fuller unfoundedly claimed Markaunt attended Peterhouse, a claim repudiated by Robert Masters. Markaunt served as senior proctor of the University in 1417-18, when he was involved in a town and gown controversy. Some scholars of the University had posted a page of vulgar poetry to the gate of the Mayor of Cambridge's house. Markaunt was tasked with defending these scholars, criticising the town for prior incidents where the University was victimised. In 1418, the Mayor and commonalty formally complained about the university, citing Markaunt's name and position in the complaint, which is how these events are now known.

After this period, Markaunt is only sporadically accounted for in college records. On 14 October 1430, he was one of four witnesses for the University in the so-called 'Barnwell process', then forty-eight years old, according to contemporary records. This 'process' was concerned with establishing the college's privileges as above those of the bishop. From 1437 to 1439, he is listed in college records as directly below the Master of the college in order of seniority. Having recently become a confrater and consortis of the college, Markaunt died on 19 November 1439. He left behind a will, made on 4 November. His memorial in MS 232 (see below) reads:

Latin	English
Registrum magistri Thomæ Markaunt nuper consortis et confratris Collegii Corporis Christi et sanctæ Mariæ Cantabriggiæ, cujus animæ propitietur omnipotens, qui ab hujus mundi transiit miseria anno Domini 1439, et regis Henrici VI. post conquestum 18°, mensis Novembris die 19, littera dominicalis D.	Master Thomas Markaunt, recently a partner and fellow of the College of Corpus Christi and the Blessed Virgin Mary, Cambridge, whose suffering in the world passed in AD 1439, and [reign of] Henry VI. after the conquest, 18th [year of his reign], on 19 November, dominical letter D.

== Bequest of books ==
In his will of 4 November, Markaunt bequeathed seventy-five books (Note: The catalogue of these books is numbered 1-76, but Cheney (1987) notes that no. 30 has been omitted, and so counts only seventy-five books.)—consisting mainly of standard university textbooks, classical texts, and commentaries—to Corpus Christi college. These books were neatly catalogued - numbered, priced, particularized, and recorded with an incipit - in a register found in one quire of a parchment manuscript of Corpus Christi (call number: CCCC MS 323). This manuscript also contains Markaunt's will, and an exhaustive borrowing register of the books, in six quires. Markaunt had obviously been a keen and wealthy bibliophile, as the total value of these books amounted to £104 12s 3d (worth approximately £67,266 in 2017) with the most expensive volume, an anthology of Aristotle and his commentators entitled Liber moralis philosophie or Moralia magna, valued at £10.

This collection had been contrived under specific rules, so that they would be entrusted to Fellows of the college under oath or pledge, who would be decided by choice, or electio. Such systems were common in English and French universities at the time, and were well-established in monastery libraries, though Corpus Christi was much smaller than most colleges, so its systems was more concerned with "provid[ing] each fellow with as complete a collection of texts of Aristotle, logical texts, and commentaries on Aristotle by Averroës as his position warranted", rather than extracurricular items. In MS 323, the rules of this loan system are laid out (f. 1r-3r), and a register of the borrowers of these books - with the date, the Fellow's name, and the title of the book - catalogued from 1440 to 1517 and laid out in tedious detail (f. 18r-123r). The system determined, in detail, how custodians would be chosen, and what prayers would have to be recited to keep the books on loan, though the college didn't rigorously follow them, with Markaunt intending for the rules to be flexible.

Through the 15th and 16th-centuries, Markaunt's books slowly disappeared from the college's collections. The first to disappear was the cheapest in the collection, a 12d volume on philosophy in 1460, and these books continued to disappear as Markaunt's system of electiones became less popular among scholars, up until 1517, when the records of electiones cease. Matthew Parker, Archbishop of Canterbury and Fellow/Master of Corpus Christi (1527-1553), attended the college at what could have been opportune time to record the current circumstances of the books, but no records were made and Parker's own bequest inadvertently erased much of what remained of Markaunt's legacy. As of 1987, medieval historian C. R. Cheney was only able to identify five books of Markaunt's (nos. 15, 18, 21, 31, 72, 76) that still remained in the college's collection.

== "Markaunt's book" ==
While in charge of the defense of the University in 1417, Markaunt compiled a collection of useful and relevant records, for his own personal use, transcribing several ancient statutes and privileges of the college. This book is now known as 'Markaunt's book' or 'register' (and sometimes archaically: Liber priuilegiorum et statutorum uniuersitatis Cantabriggie) and contains several invaluable historical resources of the college, including a unique collection of the university's statutes, and short account of the college's ceremony of inception. Robert Hare (d. 1611) used it extensively in his antiquarian works on Cambridge, and, after the college lost it twice, it was presented for him for safekeeping. In 1594, it was presented to the University, but it had been misplaced twice by the time of Thomas Fuller (1608-1661), who despondently predicted that the invaluable work would never be recovered again. Fortunately, the work was recovered by Thomas Baker (1656-1740), and is currently stored in the University archives.

Markaunt's proposed authorship of the book has been questioned by scholar Walter Ullmann: noting the absence of any "prima facie evidence of an internal or external character to justify the ascription" and the transcription of some records produced after Markaunt's death. But this suspicion has been criticized by M. B. Hackett, citing the fact that the Liber priuilegiorum in Markaunt's catalogue is identical to the modern copy of Markaunt's book, which he takes as sufficient proof the book is "none other than Markaunt's".

This collection of statutes has been regarded by archivist M. B. Hackett as "a most valuable and in some ways unique record of royal and episcopal privileges, papal bulls and miscellaneous deeds". Catherine Hall, writing for the Oxford Dictionary of National Biography, maintains that, while "not unique of its kind", Markaunt's book "is of exceptional interest" and "modern scholarship still remains lastingly indebted to Markaunt for his transcripts and the records of his library". Because of this collection of books, Markaunt has gained a legacy as an antiquarian, especially among the college's historians, with Masters describing him as "one of the most eminent antiquaries of his time", but there survives no evidence of his antiquarian predilections beyond this, and his sizeable collection of books, according to Cheney. Hall has similarly been critical of this identification, calling it "unfounded".

== Sources ==
- Cheney, C. R. (1987). "A Register of MSS Borrowed from a College Library, 1440-1517: Corpus Christi College, Cambridge MS 232". Transactions of the Cambridge Bibliographical Society. 9 (2): 103–129. JSTOR 41154648. (Subscription required.)
- Hackett, M. B. (1970). The Original Statutes of Cambridge University: The Text and its History. Cambridge: Cambridge University Press. ISBN 9780521070768.
- Hall, Catherine (2004). "Markaunt, Thomas". Oxford Dictionary of National Biography (online ed.). Oxford University Press. doi:10.1093/ref:odnb/18062. (Subscription, Wikipedia Library access or UK public library membership required.)
- Masters, Roberts (1831) [1753]. Lamb, John (ed.). History of the College of Corpus Christi and the Blessed in the University of Cambridge. History of the College of Corpus Christi and the B. Virgin Mary (Commonly called Bene't) in the University of Cambridge.1831. Cambridge: John Smith.
- Tait, James (1893). "Markaunt, Thomas" . In Lee, Sidney (ed.). Dictionary of National Biography. Vol. 36. London: Smith, Elder & Co.
- Ullmann, W. (1958). "Note: The Decline of the Chancellor's Authority in Medieval Cambridge: A Rediscovered Statute". The Historical Journal. 1 (2): 176–182. doi:10.1017/s0018246x00022731. S2CID 159584129.
