= William Ward =

William Ward or Willie Ward or Will Ward may refer to:

== Sports ==
- William Ward (American football) (1874–1936), American football coach at the University of Michigan in 1896
- William Ward (Australian cricketer) (1863–1948), Australian cricketer
- William Ward (cricketer, born 1787) (1787–1849), English cricketer, scorer of the first-ever double-century
- William Ward (cricketer, born 1874) (1874–1961), English cricketer
- William Ward (tennis) (born 1986), New Zealand tennis player
- Willie Ward (1909–1987), American baseball player
- Billy Ward (rugby league) (1888–?), rugby league footballer of the 1910s for Great Britain, England, and Leeds
- William Ward (1893–1968), American boxer who fought under the name Kid Norfolk

== Military ==
- William Ward (Royal Navy officer) (1829–1900)
- William Ward (Texas soldier) (died 1836), American lieutenant-colonel during the Texas Revolution
- William E. Ward (born 1949), American general officer of the United States Army; inaugural combatant commander of United States Africa Command
- William F. Ward Jr. (1928–2018), United States Army general
- William H. Ward (1840–1927), American army officer and Medal of Honor recipient
- William Thomas Ward (1808–1878), American army general and congressman from Kentucky

== Politics ==
- William Ward (1677–1720), member of parliament for Staffordshire, 1710–1713 and 1715–1720
- William Ward (mayor) (1807–1889), English aayor of Oxford
- William Ward (MP for Morpeth) (fl. 1553–63), MP for Morpeth, and for Carlisle
- William Ward (Pennsylvania politician) (1837–1895), American politician, U.S. representative from Pennsylvania
- William Ward (police officer) (1921–2006), Pittsburgh police chief in 1986
- William Ward, 2nd Earl of Dudley (1867–1932), British politician, lord lieutenant of Ireland and governor-Ggeneral of Australia
- William Ward, 3rd Earl of Dudley (1894–1969), British Conservative politician
- William Ward, 3rd Viscount Dudley and Ward (1750–1823), British peer and politician
- William Ward Jr. (1865–1949), American politician from Pennsylvania
- William D. Ward, American politician, member of the Florida House of Representatives
- William Dudley Ward (1877–1946), British Liberal politician and Olympic sailor
- William F. Ward (born 1951), American lawyer and politician (Pennsylvania)
- William John Ward (1880–1971), Canadian farmer and politician in Manitoba
- William L. Ward (1856–1933), American politician, US representative from New York
- William T. Ward (Wisconsin legislator), member of the Wisconsin State Assembly for 1850
- William W. Ward (1903–?), American politician, member of the Wisconsin State Assembly

== Religion ==
- William Ward (bishop) (1761–1838), Anglican clergyman and the Bishop of Sodor and Man
- William Ward (missionary) (1769–1823), British pioneer, Baptist missionary
- William Ward (priest) (c. 1560–1641), English Roman Catholic martyr
- William George Ward (1812–1882), English Roman Catholic theologian and mathematician
- William Hayes Ward (1835–1916), American clergyman, editor, and Orientalist
- William Humble Ward, 10th Baron Ward (1781–1835), clergyman

== Other fields ==
- William Ward (astronomer) (1944–2018), American astronomer
- William Ward (engraver) (1766–1826), English engraver
- William Ward (frontiersman) (1752–1822), frontiersman, early settler of western Virginia, Kentucky and Ohio
- William Ward (goldsmith), English goldsmith and financier
- William Ward (physician) (1534–1604?), English physician and translator
- William Ward (poet) (1823–1887), jeweler, poet, and editor in Mississippi
- William Ward (Utah architect) (1827–1893), architect in Utah
- William Ward, 1st Earl of Dudley (1817–1885), British peer and benefactor
- William Ward, 4th Earl of Dudley (1920–2013), British peer
- William Ward, 10th Baron Dudley (1685–1740)
- William Ward, 8th Viscount Bangor (born 1948)
- William Arthur Ward (1921–1994), American motivational writer
- William Ayres Ward (1928–1996), American Egyptologist
- William Erskine Ward (1838–1916), British Indian Civil Service officer
- William Henry Ward, American inventor
- W. R. Ward (William Reginald Ward, 1925–2010), English historian

== See also ==
- Bill Ward (disambiguation)
