= Fen Edge =

Collection of villages in South Cambridgeshire, England

Coordinates: 52.292°N 0.151°E

Fen Edge is an area and collection of villages in the South Cambridgeshire district of Cambridgeshire, England. The five villages in Fen Edge are Cottenham, Landbeach, Rampton, Waterbeach and Willingham. They are twinned with Avrillé in the Maine-et-Loire region of France. Fen Edge can also refer to any settlement in general on the edge of the Fens, including Peterborough, Soham and Burwell amongst others.
