= Bill Ward =

Bill Ward may refer to:

- Bill Ward (actor) (born 1967), English actor
- Bill Ward (American football) (1921–1992), offensive guard in American football in the National Football League
- Bill Ward (British artist) (1927–1996), British erotic artist
- Bill Ward (cartoonist) (1919–1998), "good girl art" cartoonist
- Bill Ward (footballer, born 1891) (1891–1978), Australian rules footballer for St Kilda
- Bill Ward (footballer, born 1901) (1901–1969), Australian rules footballer for St Kilda
- Bill Ward (musician) (born 1948), drummer for Black Sabbath
- Billy Ward (rugby league) (1888–?), English rugby league footballer who played in the 1900s, 1910s and 1920s
- Bill Ward (rugby union)

== See also ==
- Billy Ward and his Dominoes, American R&B group of the 1950s
- William Ward (disambiguation)
