= 2006 South Cambridgeshire District Council election =

2006 UK local government election

South Cambridgeshire District Council election, 2006

Results by ward of the 2006 local election in South Cambridgeshire

Overall composition of the council following the 2006 election

Elections to South Cambridgeshire District Council took place on Thursday 4 May 2006, as part of the 2006 United Kingdom local elections. Twenty seats, making up just over one third of South Cambridgeshire District Council, were up for election, with a by-election being held in one ward (Harston and Hauxton). Seats up for election in 2006 were last contested at the 2004 election, when all seats were up for election due to new ward boundaries, and were next contested at the 2010 election. The Conservative Party remained the largest party with an increased number of seats, but the council remained under no overall control.

== Summary ==
At this election, the Conservative Party and the Liberal Democrats were defending eight seats each. Independent councillors were defending in three wards, while Labour were defending in Sawston. The Liberal Democrats lost three seats to the Conservatives in Balsham, Melbourn and Waterbeach, but gained the Shelfords and Stapleford from the Conservatives. In Milton, the incumbent independent councillor ran for re-election as a Liberal Democrat. Other Conservative gains included from Labour in Sawston as well as from an independent in Cottenham. In Histon and Impington however an independent, who had run as a Conservative in 2004, defeated the incumbent Conservative councillor.

== Results ==
South Cambridgeshire District Council election, 2006
Party	Seats				Popular vote	
Party	Won	Not up	Total	±	Votes	%
Conservative	11	14	25	+3	14,193	46.8
Liberal Democrats	7	12	19	−1	11,651	38.4
Independent	2	10	12	−1	1,760	5.8
Labour	0	1	1	−1	1,420	4.7
Green	0	0	0	0	1,140	3.8
Respect	0	0	0	0	86	0.3
Monster Raving Loony	0	0	0	0	56	0.2
Total	20	37	57	–	30,306	–
Turnout						40.2

== Results by ward ==
Balsham Ward
Party	Candidate	Votes	%	±%
Conservative	Victoria Grace Ford	1,060	51.2	+0.1
Liberal Democrats	Samuel John Agnew	1,011	48.8	−0.1
Majority		49		
Turnout			58.7	
Conservative gain from Liberal Democrats		Swing		

Bar Hill Ward
Party	Candidate	Votes	%	±%
Conservative	Bunty Elizabeth Waters	932	56.5	+6.7
Liberal Democrats	Thomas Joseph Flanagan	537	32.6	−4.9
Labour	John Samuel Shepherd	94	5.7	−1.3
Respect	Steven Sweeney	86	5.2	N/A
Majority		395		
Turnout			43.2	
Conservative hold		Swing		

Bassingbourn Ward
Party	Candidate	Votes	%	±%
Conservative	David Charles McCraith	751	55.9	+9.2
Green	Simon Peter Saggers	319	23.8	+3.2
Liberal Democrats	Anthony Stuart Milton	272	20.3	N/A
Majority		432		
Turnout			39.2	
Conservative hold		Swing		

Bourn Ward
Party	Candidate	Votes	%	±%
Conservative	David Hugh Morgan	737	46.1	−8.6
Liberal Democrats	Jonathan Rolf Hansford	417	26.1	−8.2
Independent	Clayton James Hudson	300	18.8	N/A
Labour	Mark David Hurn	145	9.1	+2.2
Majority		320		
Turnout			36.5	
Conservative hold		Swing		

Caldecote Ward
Party	Candidate	Votes	%	±%
Liberal Democrats	Robin Barry Martlew	423	52.7	−3.4
Conservative	Adrian Michael Peck	347	43.2	−0.7
Labour	Helen Mary Haugh	33	4.1	N/A
Majority		76		
Turnout			46.0	
Liberal Democrats hold		Swing		

Cottenham Ward
Party	Candidate	Votes	%	±%
Conservative	Nigel Charles Francis Bolitho	1,207	59.8	+23.7
Liberal Democrats	Linden Mary Leeke	811	40.2	+13.9
Majority		396		
Turnout			34.1	
Conservative gain from Independent		Swing		

Fulbourn Ward
Party	Candidate	Votes	%	±%
Independent	Sandra June Olga Doggett	599	44.7	+24.0
Liberal Democrats	John George Williams	423	31.5	+3.4
Conservative	Alison Mary Farmer	319	23.8	+2.7
Majority		176		
Turnout			39.3	
Independent hold		Swing		

Gamlingay Ward
Party	Candidate	Votes	%	±%
Liberal Democrats	Ann Elsby	787	54.9	−14.5
Conservative	Mark John Taylor	529	36.9	+6.3
Labour	Grace Mary Everson	117	8.2	N/A
Majority		258		
Turnout			37.9	
Liberal Democrats hold		Swing		

Girton Ward
Party	Candidate	Votes	%	±%
Conservative	Thomas Dominic Bygott	685	48.1	−7.5
Liberal Democrats	Peter Robert Fane	439	30.9	+6.6
Green	Teal Richard Riley	178	12.5	−7.6
Labour	Michael Idowu	121	8.5	N/A
Majority		246		
Turnout			45.4	
Conservative hold		Swing		

Harston and Hauxton Ward
Party	Candidate	Votes	%	±%
Liberal Democrats	Janet Elizabeth Lockwood	550	58.5	+12.7
Conservative	Alan William Langley	390	41.5	+4.0
Majority		160		
Turnout			50.9	
Liberal Democrats hold		Swing		

Histon and Impington Ward
Party	Candidate	Votes	%	±%
Independent	Neil Sinnett Davies	861	34.7	N/A
Conservative	Jean Anne Muncey	816	32.9	+1.3
Liberal Democrats	Thomas Frederick Ralph Lynn	614	24.7	−9.8
Green	Mark Johan Alexander Claessen	191	7.7	+3.3
Majority		45		
Turnout			39.9	
Independent gain from Conservative		Swing		

Linton Ward
Party	Candidate	Votes	%	±%
Liberal Democrats	Patricia Mary Bear	947	65.5	+4.8
Conservative	Robert Patrick James Altham	499	34.5	+1.7
Majority		448		
Turnout			40.6	
Liberal Democrats hold		Swing		

Melbourn Ward
Party	Candidate	Votes	%	±%
Conservative	Janice Mary Guest	1,077	56.7	+15.8
Liberal Democrats	David Adrian Louis George Wherrell	574	30.2	−21.0
Green	Sally Ann Seagrave Nichols	126	6.6	−1.2
Labour	Michael William Kernaghan	122	6.4	N/A
Majority		503		
Turnout			46.4	
Conservative gain from Liberal Democrats		Swing		

Meldreth Ward
Party	Candidate	Votes	%	±%
Liberal Democrats	Susan Elizabeth Kerr van de Ven	546	63.9	+10.8
Conservative	Lister John Wilson	261	30.5	−10.0
Green	Pauline Radley	48	5.6	−0.8
Majority		285		
Turnout			47.7	
Liberal Democrats hold		Swing		

Milton Ward
Party	Candidate	Votes	%	±%
Liberal Democrats	Richard Summerfield	686	52.1	+19.6
Conservative	Gerda Covell	575	43.7	+16.8
Monster Raving Loony	Timothy John Franklin (aka Speedways Fast Freddy)	56	4.3	N/A
Majority		111		
Turnout			43.8	
Liberal Democrats gain from Independent		Swing		

Sawston Ward
Party	Candidate	Votes	%	±%
Conservative	Raymond Michael Matthews	862	49.8	+0.3
Labour	Nigel Peter Carder	590	34.1	+19.1
Green	Jacquelyn Jean Garfit	278	16.1	N/A
Majority		272		
Turnout			32.3	
Conservative gain from Labour		Swing		

Swavesey Ward
Party	Candidate	Votes	%	±%
Conservative	Susan Mary Ellington	unopposed		
Conservative hold		Swing		

The Shelfords and Stapleford Ward
Party	Candidate	Votes	%	±%
Liberal Democrats	Anthony Neil Berent	1,248	46.4	+24.2
Conservative	Simon Robert Carne King	1,244	46.3	−18.7
Labour	Michael Robert Nettleton	198	7.4	−5.5
Majority		4		
Turnout			48.9	
Liberal Democrats gain from Conservative		Swing		

Waterbeach Ward
Party	Candidate	Votes	%	±%
Conservative	Peter Terence Johnson	943	56.2	+16.5
Liberal Democrats	Jane Rata Williamson	735	43.8	+10.1
Majority		208		
Turnout			42.8	
Conservative gain from Liberal Democrats		Swing		

Willingham and Over Ward
Party	Candidate	Votes	%	±%
Conservative	Philippa Saran Corney	959	60.3	+6.3
Liberal Democrats	Leslie Harold Gelling	631	39.7	+3.9
Majority		328		
Turnout			32.1	
Conservative hold		Swing		
