= 2010 South Cambridgeshire District Council election =

2010 UK local government election

South Cambridgeshire District Council election, 2010

Results by ward of the 2010 local election in South Cambridgeshire

Overall composition of the council following the 2010 election

Elections to South Cambridgeshire District Council took place on Thursday 6 May 2010, as part of the 2010 United Kingdom local elections. The elections also took place at the same time as the 2010 United Kingdom general election. Nineteen seats, constituting one third of the South Cambridgeshire District Council, were up for election. Seats up for election in 2010 were last contested at the 2006 election. The Conservative Party retained their majority on the council, despite losing seats.

== Summary ==
At this election, Conservatives were defending 11 seats, Liberal Democrats were defending 6 seats and Independents were defending 2. Since the 2006 election, a by-election had been held in Balsham where the Conservatives had held the seat.

The Liberal Democrats had a good night, taking seats from the Conservatives in Balsham, Cottenham and Melbourn and from independents in Fulbourn and Histon and Impington. Conservatives however gained a seat from the Liberal Democrats in the Shelfords and Stapleford.

== Results ==
South Cambridgeshire District Council election, 2010
Party	Seats				Popular vote	
Party	Won	Not up	Total	±	Votes	%
Conservative	9	20	29	−2	24,189	42.9
Liberal Democrats	10	10	20	+4	21,142	37.5
Labour	0	1	1	0	5,155	9.1
Independent	0	7	7	−2	3,258	5.8
Green	0	0	0	0	1,422	2.5
UKIP	0	0	0	0	1,215	2.2
Total	19	38	57	–	56,381	–
Turnout						73.9

== Results by ward ==
Balsham Ward
Party	Candidate	Votes	%	±%
Liberal Democrats	Pauline Elizabeth Jarvis	1,400	50.2	+1.3
Conservative	Andrew Walter Blant	1,391	49.8	−1.3
Majority		9		
Turnout			77.8	
Liberal Democrats gain from Conservative		Swing		

Bar Hill Ward
Party	Candidate	Votes	%	±%
Conservative	Bunty Elizabeth Waters	1,453	51.9	−4.6
Liberal Democrats	Susan Gymer	628	22.5	−10.1
Labour	John Samuel Shepherd	337	12.1	+6.4
Independent	John Doland	164	5.9	N/A
UKIP	George Wallie Oliver Lawrence	137	4.9	N/A
Green	Donald Allan McBride	77	2.8	N/A
Majority		825		
Turnout			71.2	
Conservative hold		Swing		

Bassingbourn Ward
Party	Candidate	Votes	%	±%
Conservative	David Charles McCraith	1,012	40.2	−15.8
Independent	Peter James Robinson	609	24.2	N/A
Liberal Democrats	Peter Robert Fane	339	13.5	−6.8
Green	Simon Peter Saggers	326	12.9	−10.8
Labour	Gabriele Falcini	232	9.2	N/A
Majority		403		
Turnout			72.3	
Conservative hold		Swing		

Bourn Ward
Party	Candidate	Votes	%	±%
Conservative	David Hugh Morgan	1,935	45.3	−0.8
Liberal Democrats	Jonathan Rolf Hansford	1,670	39.1	+12.9
Labour	Mumtaz Khan	489	11.4	+2.4
UKIP	Peter Michael Verrechia	180	4.2	N/A
Majority		265		
Turnout			71.3	
Conservative hold		Swing		

Caldecote Ward
Party	Candidate	Votes	%	±%
Liberal Democrats	Olutumininu Olufolabomi Hawkins	663	45.6	−7.1
Conservative	Mark Roy Taylor	611	41.9	−1.2
Green	James Preece	94	6.5	N/A
Labour	Norman Alexander Crowther	87	5.9	+1.9
Majority		52		
Turnout			77.6	
Liberal Democrats hold		Swing		

Cottenham Ward
Party	Candidate	Votes	%	±%
Liberal Democrats	Lynda Harford	1,915	43.5	+3.3
Conservative	Nigel Charles Francis Bolitho	1,877	42.6	−17.2
UKIP	Eric Heaver	308	6.9	N/A
Green	Heather Anne Macbeth-Hornett	305	6.9	N/A
Majority		38		
Turnout			73.4	
Liberal Democrats gain from Conservative		Swing		

Fulbourn Ward
Party	Candidate	Votes	%	±%
Liberal Democrats	John George Williams	800	33.6	+2.1
Independent	Sandra June Olga Doggett	724	30.5	−14.2
Conservative	Richard Michael Turner	614	25.8	+2.0
Labour	Godson Adedoyin Lawal	240	10.1	N/A
Majority		76		
Turnout			70.1	
Liberal Democrats gain from Independent		Swing		

Gamlingay Ward
Party	Candidate	Votes	%	±%
Liberal Democrats	Bridget Zoe Dorrington Smith	1,241	43.9	−11.0
Conservative	Adrian Neil Dent	1,130	39.9	+3.0
Independent	Christina Hendrina Jozephina M. Baxter-Van Zutphen	299	10.6	N/A
Labour	Grace Mary Everson	158	5.6	−2.6
Majority		111		
Turnout			73.6	
Liberal Democrats hold		Swing		

Girton Ward
Party	Candidate	Votes	%	±%
Conservative	Thomas Dominic Bygott	1,067	41.4	−6.8
Liberal Democrats	Brian John Bromwich	994	38.6	+7.7
Labour	Christopher Jones	258	10.0	+1.5
Green	Teal Richard Riley	186	7.2	−5.3
UKIP	Aubrey Malcolm Chapman	73	2.8	N/A
Majority		73		
Turnout			76.4	
Conservative hold		Swing		

Histon and Impington Ward
Party	Candidate	Votes	%	±%
Liberal Democrats	Edd Stonham	1,775	34.4	+9.6
Independent	Neil Sinnett Davies	1,462	28.3	−6.4
Conservative	Philip Scott	1,189	23.0	−9.9
Labour	Niamh Marian Sweeney	561	10.9	N/A
UKIP	Valeri Sybil Fryer	176	3.4	N/A
Majority		313		
Turnout			82.6	
Liberal Democrats gain from Independent		Swing		

Linton Ward
Party	Candidate	Votes	%	±%
Liberal Democrats	Patricia Mary Bear	1,353	50.0	−15.5
Conservative	Roger Keith Hickford	1,098	40.6	+6.1
Labour	Stuart Mark Colley	173	6.4	N/A
UKIP	Timothy Mark Skottowe	82	3.0	N/A
Majority		255		
Turnout			75.2	
Liberal Democrats hold		Swing		

Melbourn Ward
Party	Candidate	Votes	%	±%
Liberal Democrats	Jose Hales	1,476	45.1	+14.9
Conservative	Colin Jaffray	1,343	41.0	−15.7
Labour	Angela Mary Patrick	231	7.1	+0.6
UKIP	Graham Peter Wilkinson	158	4.8	N/A
Green	Samuel James Morris	66	2.0	−4.6
Majority		133		
Turnout			76.5	
Liberal Democrats gain from Conservative		Swing		

Meldreth Ward
Party	Candidate	Votes	%	±%
Liberal Democrats	Surinder Mohan Soond	717	50.0	−13.8
Conservative	Duncan Richard Bullivant	474	33.1	+2.6
Labour	Hywel Lamont Jackson	102	7.1	N/A
UKIP	David William Poyntz Kendrick	101	7.1	N/A
Green	Colin Frank Reynolds	39	2.7	−2.9
Majority		243		
Turnout			75.8	
Liberal Democrats hold		Swing		

Milton Ward
Party	Candidate	Votes	%	±%
Liberal Democrats	Mark Peter Hersom	1,274	58.4	+6.3
Conservative	Gerda Ann Covell	908	41.6	−2.1
Majority		366		
Turnout			72.3	
Liberal Democrats hold		Swing		

Sawston Ward
Party	Candidate	Votes	%	±%
Conservative	Raymond Michael Matthews	2,167	62.4	+12.6
Labour	Lewis Daniel Evans	1,304	37.6	+3.5
Majority		863		
Turnout			65.8	
Conservative hold		Swing		

Swavesey Ward
Party	Candidate	Votes	%	±%
Conservative	Susan Mary Ellington	784	56.2	N/A
Liberal Democrats	Vivien Caroline Biggs	480	34.4	N/A
Labour	Michael Lindsay Wilson	132	9.5	N/A
Majority		304		
Turnout			73.4	
Conservative hold		Swing		

The Shelfords and Stapleford Ward
Party	Candidate	Votes	%	±%
Conservative	Benjamin Shelton	1,942	45.9	−0.4
Liberal Democrats	Michael Thomas Kilpatrick	1,517	35.9	−10.5
Labour	Michael Robert Nettleton	444	10.5	+3.1
Green	Linda Jane Whitebread	329	7.8	N/A
Majority		425		
Turnout			76.2	
Conservative gain from Liberal Democrats		Swing		

Waterbeach Ward
Party	Candidate	Votes	%	±%
Conservative	Peter Terence Johnson	1,416	50.7	−5.5
Liberal Democrats	Adrian James Wright	1,379	49.3	+5.5
Majority		37		
Turnout			71.3	
Conservative hold		Swing		

Willingham and Over Ward
Party	Candidate	Votes	%	±%
Conservative	Philippa Saran Corney	1,778	47.9	−12.3
Liberal Democrats	Geoffrey Malcolm Gaiger Twiss	1,521	41.0	+1.4
Labour	Joanne Frances Murray	407	10.9	N/A
Majority		257		
Turnout			71.7	
Conservative hold		Swing		
