= Church of St John the Evangelist, Waterbeach =

Church in Cambridgeshire, England

Coordinates: 52.26370°N 0.19279°E

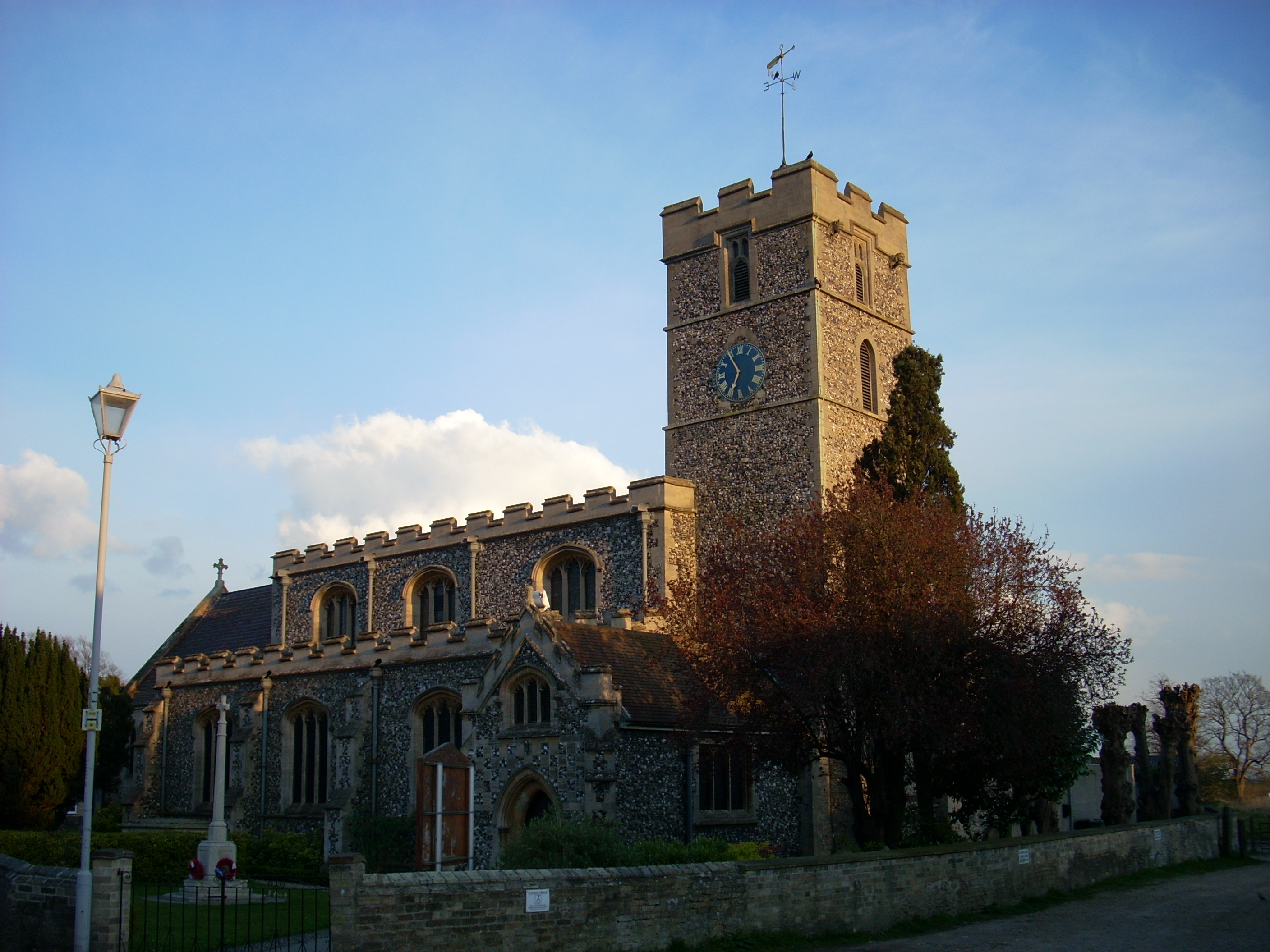
St John's Church

The Anglican Church of St John the Evangelist (also known as St John's Church) is the parish church of the village of Waterbeach in Cambridgeshire, England. It is a grade II* listed building.

== History ==
The church dates from the 12th century, and around 1160 priests were recorded. In the early 13th century the tower was added to the small aisled church which had been built in the 12th. The church was associated with Barnwell Priory until the dissolution of the monasteries.

The condition of the church deteriorated in the 17th and 18th centuries and attendances fell. The tower and spire were replaced after collapse in 1821. Restoration and rebuilding of the chancel was undertaken in 1848, and it underwent a Victorian restoration by W.M. Fawcett in 1871, and John Ladds in 1878.

In 2018 an event, entitled Waterbeach Thread[ed], was held in the church using a variety of clothing and textiles to "draw attention to the impact of clothing on the environment, human trafficking, church life, poverty, and consumerism".

The parish is within the Diocese of Ely.

== Architecture ==
The limestone building has lead and tiled roofs. It has a chancel and three-bay aisle. The tower has a parapet and is supported by buttresses. In the tower are five bells. The tenor bell is tuned to G# and weighs 7cwt.

This church contains an electric pipe organ. The Caen stone pulpit is inlaid with mosaics.

In the churchyard is a stone cross which acts as a memorial to those from Waterbreach who perished in World War I and World War II. It also contains 25 war graves related to the nearby RAF Waterbeach.
