= Waterbeach Barracks =

Former British Army installation in Cambridgeshire, England

- Waterbeach
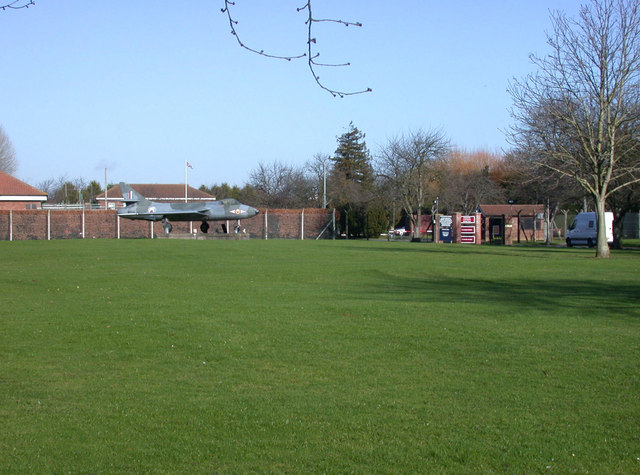
- Waterbeach Barracks

Site information
- Type: Barracks
- Owner: Ministry of Defence
- Operator: British Army

Location
- Location within Cambridgeshire
- Coordinates: 52°16′28″N 000°11′24″E

Site history
- Built: 1966
- In use: 1966-2013

Waterbeach Barracks was a military installation in Waterbeach, Cambridgeshire. The site was an RAF Station, RAF Waterbeach, and was later used by the Royal Engineers, part of the British Army, from 1966 until its closure in 2013 to make way for housing.

== History ==
In 1966 the station and airfield remained the property of the Ministry of Defence, but was transferred from the Royal Air Force to the Royal Engineers, part of the British Army. Until the closure of nearby RAF Oakington in the early 1970s, the main runway at Waterbeach remained active, along with the control tower, and was used as a relief landing ground for Varsities used in the advanced pilot training role. The barracks, airfield and surrounding quarters most recently housed 12 (Air Support) Engineer Group. The former airfield was used as a training area for troops, with occasional visits by helicopters and, in the past, by Harriers. 25 Engineer Regiment was disbanded on 19 April 2012. Two of its squadrons (34 Field Squadron and 53 Field Squadron) have become part of 39 Engineer Regiment and will move to RAF Kinloss.

A new town built on the site of Waterbeach Barracks and former airfield was proposed in the 1980s. In July 2011 the Ministry of Defence announced that Waterbeach Barracks will close, and the site sold for housing. In November 2011 and March 2012 the Ministry of Defence announced that 39 Engineer Regiment would move to Kinloss Barracks in July 2012. A total of 930 Service personnel will move to Kinloss, and 44 Service personnel to Wittering. HQ 12 (Air Support) Engineer Group will move from Waterbeach to RAF Wittering in October 2012, with the complete closure of Waterbeach Barracks by 1 April 2013.

First units of 39 Engineer Regiment (Air Support) arrived at Kinloss Barracks in June 2012, with the majority leaving Waterbeach during July. Their move was complete by September 2012. Waterbeach Barracks closed on 28 March 2013.

The site was subject to an MOD disposal process by the Defence Infrastructure Organisation, and in August 2014 Urban&Civic were appointed as Development Partners. In October 2015 they held open days for local residents to tour the site and meet the design team, as the first stage of their consultation on the development of the MoD site and surrounding farmland, as new settlements. Regular Newsletters for local residents are being issued. In December 2015 a community engagement report on the Open Days was published by David Lock Associates, for Urban&Civic, which included the open day display boards.

During 2016 design workshops were held bringing together the Urban&Civic and RLW Estates design teams, key local authority partners, the parish council, neighbourhood plan working group, and local residents.

The Ministry of Defence announced that disposal would not take place before 2022. Urban&Civic took over the management of the site in 2015.

== Waterbeach Military Heritage Museum ==
In June 1984, a station museum was established by the Army to record and preserve items from RAF Waterbeach - in particular, from 514 Squadron, who hold their reunions at the barracks every year - as well as artefacts from the Army (39 Engineer Regiment). Although the barracks closed in March 2013, the Museum closed to visitors on 30 September 2012.

In 2011, John Hamlin, an aviation historian and the museum curator, wrote a book documenting the history of RAF Waterbeach and Waterbeach Barracks, to raise money for the museum. In 2014, it was updated to include closure and contact information

In December 2012, a group of villagers set up a trust, the Waterbeach Military Heritage Museum, and the Army gifted the collection to it. The barracks museum contents were stored outside the barracks. The honorary curator from the barracks continued to answer enquiries and carry out research. He had an assurance from the most likely developers of the MOD-owned airfield and barracks (RLW Estates, and then Urban & Civic) that the inclusion of a Museum would form an important part of the site's heritage.

During 2015, the museum started the move back into its building at the barracks, and it was formally re-opened on 17 June 2017. The building was also made available to community groups and for use as workshops by Urban & Civic.
