= Terry Hale =

English cricketer

Personal information
- Full name: Terrance Saville Hale
- Born: 8 October 1936; Waterbeach, Cambridgeshire, England
- Died: 14 October 2021 (aged 85); Hemingford Grey, Cambridgeshire
- Batting: Left-handed

Domestic team information
- Years: Team
- 1965: Minor Counties
- 1957–1978: Cambridgeshire

Career statistics
Competition	First-class	List A
Matches	1	4
Runs scored	8	68
Batting average	4.00	17.00
100s/50s	0/0	0/1
Top score	8	51
Balls bowled	–	–
Wickets	–	–
Bowling average	–	–
5 wickets in innings	–	–
10 wickets in match	–	–
Best bowling	–	–
Catches/stumpings	–/–	1/–
- Source: Cricinfo, 26 April 2011

Terrance "Terry" Saville Hale (8 October 1936 – 14 October 2021) was an English cricketer. Hale was a left-handed batsman. He was born in Waterbeach, Cambridgeshire.

Hale made his debut for Cambridgeshire in the 1957 Minor Counties Championship against Lincolnshire. Hale played Minor counties cricket for Cambridgeshire from 1957 to 1978, which included 90 Minor Counties Championship matches. In 1964, he made his List A debut against Essex in the Gillette Cup. He played three further List A matches for Cambridgeshire, the last coming against Yorkshire in 1967. In total his four List A matches, Hale scored 68 runs at a batting average of 17.00, with a single half century high score of 51. This came against Essex in his debut List A match.

In 1965, Hale played his only first-class match for a combined Minor Counties team against the touring South Africans. In this match he was dismissed for a duck in the Minor Counties first-innings by Jackie Botten and in their second-innings he scored 8 runs before being dismissed by Atholl McKinnon.

Hale died on 14 October 2021, shortly after celebrating his 85th birthday.
