= Jack Ravensdale =

British historian and author

John Richard "Jack" Ravensdale (27 Nov 1920–25 Sep 1994) was a British historian and author known for his publications on English local history.

== Biography ==
Born in Feltham, Ravensdale studied at Fitzwilliam College, Cambridge until 1939. After World War II he worked in Adult Education in Cornwall, until 1953 when he returned to live in Cambridge. There he lectured at Impington Village College and then at Homerton College, where he became Senior Lecturer in History.

Ravensdale appeared as a speaker in the first episode of the 1982 BBC Two series History on Your Doorstep. His book History on Your Doorstep (1982) was a bestseller. A street is named after him in Landbeach, the Cambridgeshire village in which he lived from about 1971 and whose history he documented in great detail in The Domesday Inheritance (1986).

== Bibliography ==
- Liable to Floods, Cambridge University Press, Cambridge UK 1974 ISBN 052120285X
- The Local History Kit. HS31 Units 1 - 7 (with Sallie Purkiss), Cambridge National Extension College, UK 1982 ISBN 0860823172
- History on Your Doorstep, BBC Books, UK 1982 ISBN 0563164646
- National Trust Histories: Cornwall, Willow Books Collins 1984 ISBN 0002181045
- East Anglian Landscapes: Past and Present, Michael Joseph, London UK 1984 ISBN 0718123433
- The Domesday Inheritance, Souvenir Press, London UK 1986 ISBN 028562749X
- In the Steps of Chaucer's Pilgrims: From Southwark to Canterbury from the Air and on Foot, Souvenir Press, London, UK 1989 ISBN 0285628941
