= William Ward (physician) =

English physician and translator

- Born: 1534; Landbeach, Cambridgeshire
- Died: 1604?
- Occupations: Physician and translator

William Ward, or Warde, (1534–1604?) was an English physician and translator.

== Biography ==
Ward was born at Landbeach, Cambridgeshire, in 1534, was educated at Eton, whence he was elected scholar of King's College, Cambridge, 13 August 1550. On 14 August 1553 he became fellow. He proceeded B.A. in 1553–4, and M.A. in 1558. On 27 Feb. 1551–2 the provost of his college requested him to take up the study of medicine, and he became M.D. in 1567. In 1568 he vacated his fellowship. His name is attached to the petition signed in 1572 against the new statutes of the university. Letters patent dated from Westminster, 8 November 1596 (Rymer, xvi. 303), appoint ‘Willielmus Warde’ and William Burton ‘readers in medicine or the medical art’ in the university of Cambridge, with a stipend of 40l. The document speaks of the position as hitherto held, under letters patent, by Ward alone. Ward is mentioned again in 1601 in a list of Cambridge officials as queen's professor of physic. The list occurs at the end of a ‘Project for the Government of the University of Cambridge’ (Cal. State Papers, Dom. 1601–3, p. 116). It is probably in virtue of his official post at Cambridge that Ward is spoken of as physician to Queen Elizabeth and King James. He probably died soon after James's accession. In 1590 he gave to the parish of Great St. Mary, Cambridge, seven and a half acres of arable land in ‘Howsfield,’ and two acres of meadow land in Chesterton.

Ward was author of:

- ‘The Secretes of the Reverende Maister Alexis Piemont. Containyng excellent remedies against divers diseases and other accidents, with the manner to make distillations, parfumes, confitures, diynges, colours, fusions, and meltynges. … Translated out of French into English by William Warde. Imprinted at London by John Kingstone for Nicolas Inglande, dwellinge in Poules Churchyarde, Anno 1558. Mens. Novemb.,’ b.l., 4to. This apparently is the first edition of this work, containing only the first part, and consisting of six books. There is another edition (Ames, Typogr. Antiq. ed. Herbert, ii. 844) ‘Londini, Anno 1559, 12 die Mens. Novemb.,’ printed ‘by H. Sutton, dwelling in Paternoster rowe at the signe of the blacke Moryan, Anno 1559;’ and yet another (Brit. Mus. Libr. Cat.), also in 1559, ‘imprinted for J. Wight, Londini.’ These contain a dedicatory letter by Ward to the Earl of Bedford, notable for its protest against the folly of ‘some curious Christians among us nowadays … which most impudently despise all manner of medicines,’ and for its defence of the ‘heavenly science’ of physic. Ward mentions Christopher Plantin's edition of a French translation (Antwerp, 1557) as his original. The work itself has not much claim to scientific method or accuracy, but became very popular as a treasury of medical and other knowledge in all the countries of Europe. Of this first part numerous editions were published in England. In 1580 it is ‘newlie corrected and amended and also somewhat enlarged in certain places.’ W. Stansby printed an edition in 1615. This first part of the ‘Secrets’ occurs usually bound up with ‘The Seconde Parte of the Secrets of Maister Alexis of Piemont, by him collected out of divers excellent authors and newly translated out of French into English. With a general table of all the matters contayned in the sayde Booke. By Will. Warde,’ b.l., n.d., 4to, and 1560, and 1563. This is usually followed by ‘The thyrde and last parte of the Secretes of the Reverende Maister Alexis of Piemont … Englished by Wyllyam Warde,’ 1562, 4to, 1566, 1588, and 1615. This contains six books, like the first part. Here Ward's work seems to have ended; but in many copies of the book a fourth and fifth part are added, translated by R. Androse.
- ‘Thre notable sermones made by the godly and famous Clerke, Maister John Calvyn, on thre severall Sondayes in Maye, the yere 1561, upon the Psalm 46. … Englished by William Warde. Printed at London by Rouland Hill, dwellynge in Gutter Lane, at the sygne of the halfe Egle and the Keye,’ 1562, 16mo, b.l.
- ‘The most excellent, profitable, and pleasaunt Booke of the famous doctor and expert astrologian Arcandam or Aleandrin, to finde the fatall destiny, constellation, complexion, and naturall inclination of every man and childe by his birth. With an addition of Phisiognomy, very pleasant to read. Now newly tourned out of French into our vulgar tongue by William Warde,’ London, 1578, 8vo, 1592, 1626, 1630, 1670. This is a work translated into Latin from ‘a confused and indistinct’ original by Richard Roussat, ‘Canonicus Lingoniensis,’ and published at Paris in 1542.
- There is a copy of Latin verses by Ward before James Robothum's ‘Pleausaunt and wittie Playe of the Cheastes [i.e. chess] … Lately translated out of Italian into French: and now set furth in Englishe,’ London, 1562. Possibly Ward translated the French (Ames, Typogr. Antiq. ed. Herbert, ii. 803–4). ‘Gods Arrowes, or two Sermons concerning the Visitation of God by the Pestilence,’ London, 1607, 8vo, attributed in the ‘British Museum Catalogue’ to William Warde, are by a London minister of that name who can hardly have been identical with the Cambridge professor.
