= Landbeach =

Village in Cambridgeshire, England

Coordinates: 52.265°N 0.162°E

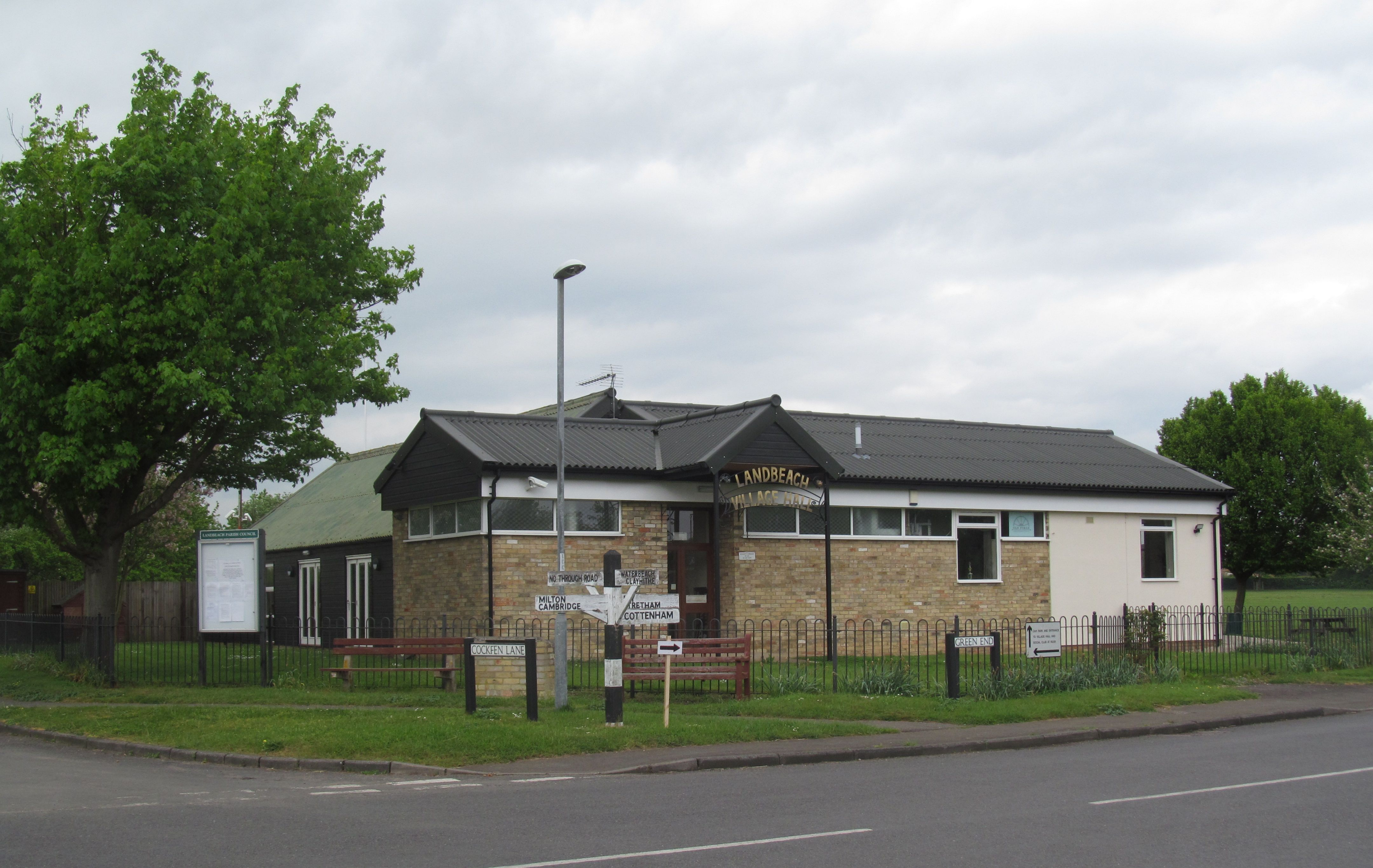
- Village hall

- Location within Cambridgeshire
- Population: 825; 848 (Including Pymoor. 2011)
- OS grid reference: TL476652
- District: South Cambridgeshire
- Shire county: Cambridgeshire
- Region: East
- Country: England
- Sovereign state: United Kingdom
- Post town: CAMBRIDGE
- Postcode district: CB25
- Dialling code: 01223
- Police: Cambridgeshire
- Fire: Cambridgeshire
- Ambulance: East of England
- UK Parliament: Ely and East Cambridgeshire

Landbeach is a small fen-edge English village about three miles (5 km) north of Cambridge. The parish covers an area of 9 km^{2} (3.5 sq mi).

== History ==
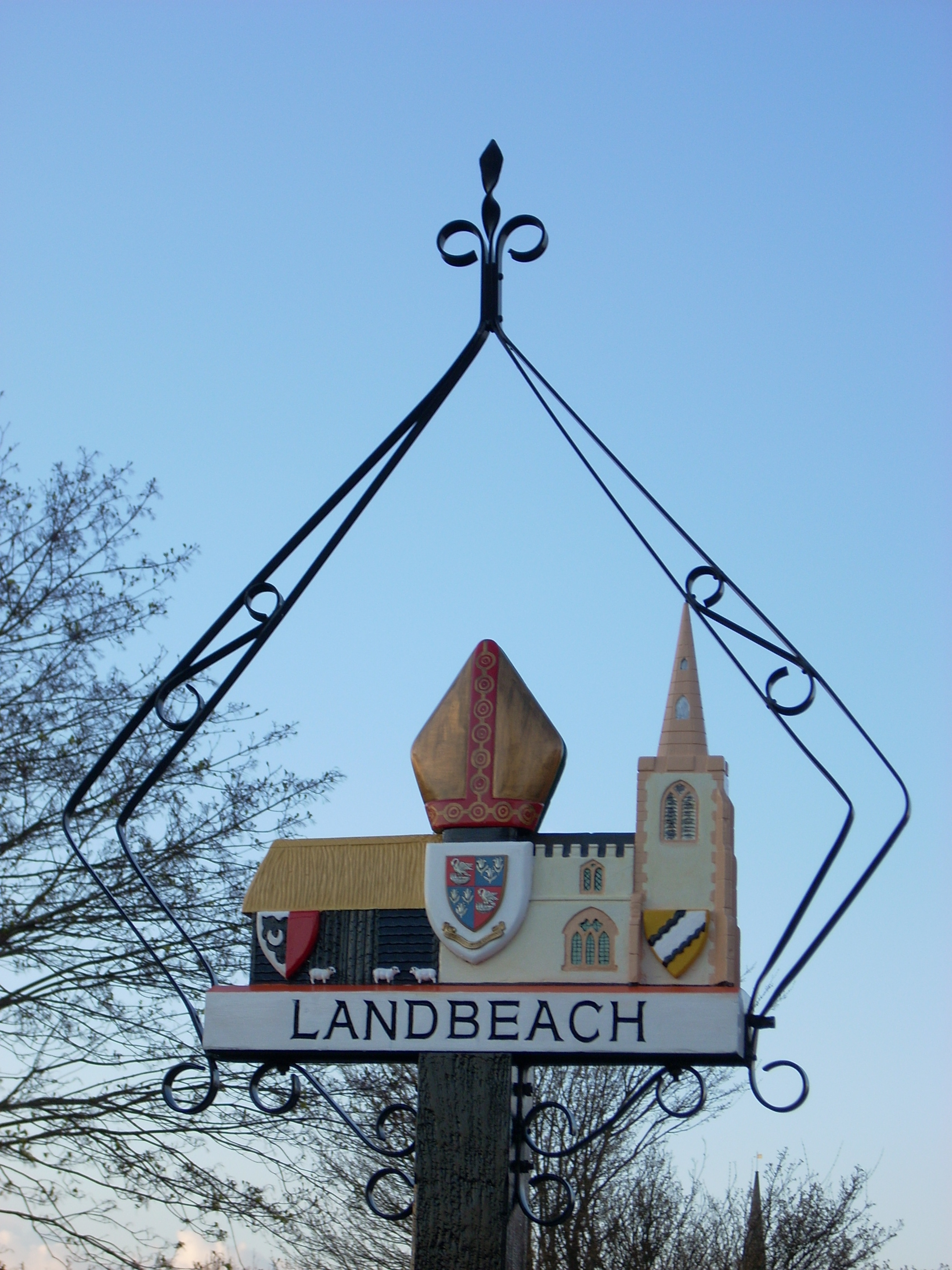
Village sign of Landbeach

The fen edge north of Cambridge was well populated in Roman times, and the village's situation on a Roman road will have helped its growth. The road, Akeman Street, which once joined Ely to London, passes close to the village from north to south. Car Dyke, the Roman drainage canal known locally as the Tilling, also runs through the village and in medieval times marked the boundary between the marshes of Landbeach and neighbouring Waterbeach. Drainage of the parish was not completed until the 18th century, and for much of the year large areas of the parish were inundated.

The village was listed as Utbech ("out bec") in the Domesday Book of 1086, and in the 13th and 14th centuries was occasionally referred to as Inbech ("in bec"). The original meaning of the "beach" part of the names is not universally agreed. One theory invokes the Anglo Saxon word bec meaning "stream", but a more plausible one gives the meaning as "shore", much like the modern "beach", as both Waterbeach and Landbeach were at the edge of The Fens, then an area of marshland.

Population reached a peak of 526 in 1851 but fell to 389 in 1911. It passed 600 for the first time in the 1950s and 800 in the 1990s. In 2012, the village contained roughly 380 dwellings and had a population of about 850 residents.

The village has three archaeological sites with remains of mediaeval manor houses, which together form a Scheduled Ancient Monument.

== Churches ==
=== All Saints (Anglican) ===
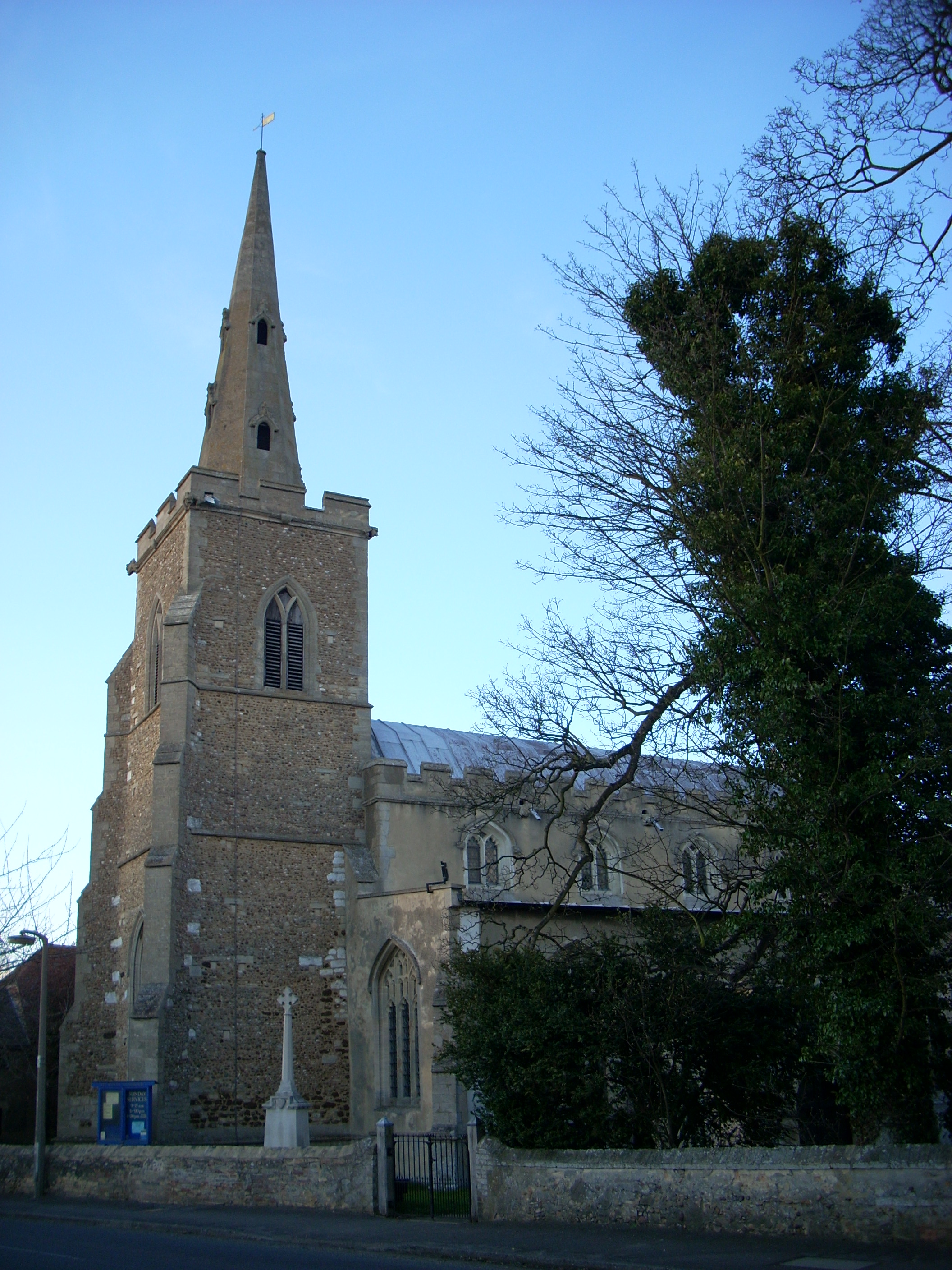
Church of All Saints

The parish church of All Saints comprises a chancel with north chapel, a nave with south porch, and a three-stage west tower with a slim octagonal spire. The majority of the present building was constructed in the 14th century, though there are some remains of the 13th-century building at the base of the tower and chancel. The church retains much of its medieval woodwork. The spire was rebuilt in 1972.

=== Landbeach and Milton Baptist Church (Baptist) ===
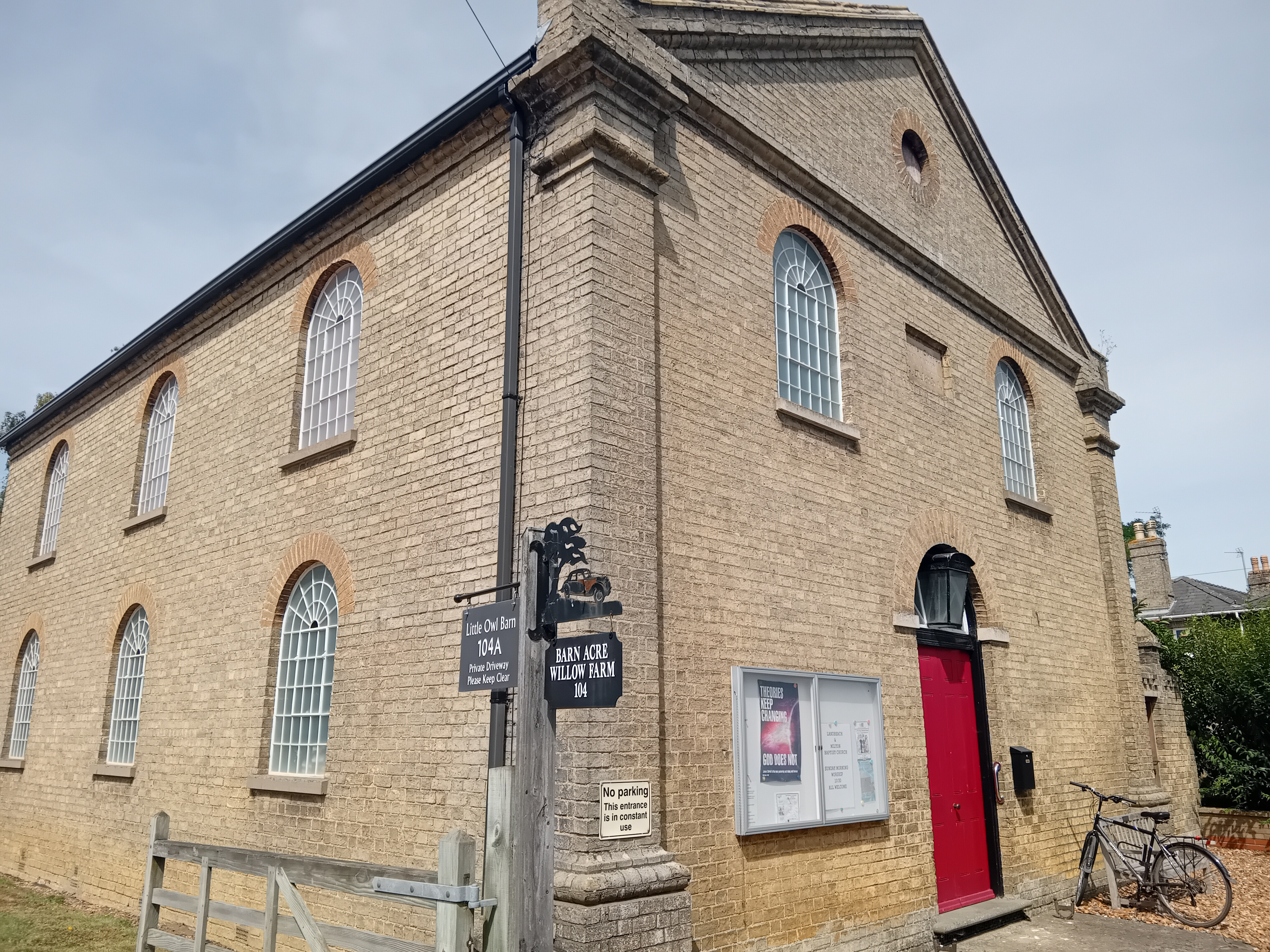
Landbeach and Milton Baptist Church building (formerly Landbeach Baptist Chapel)

The Baptist Chapel was built in 1816 with the present building erected in 1854.

Inside there is a lower floor which has chairs for seating and a balcony level which retains pews. The building was Grade II listed, specifying the windows.

The congregation of Landbeach and Milton Baptist Church currently meets in the building on Sunday mornings from 10:30am.

== Tithe barn ==
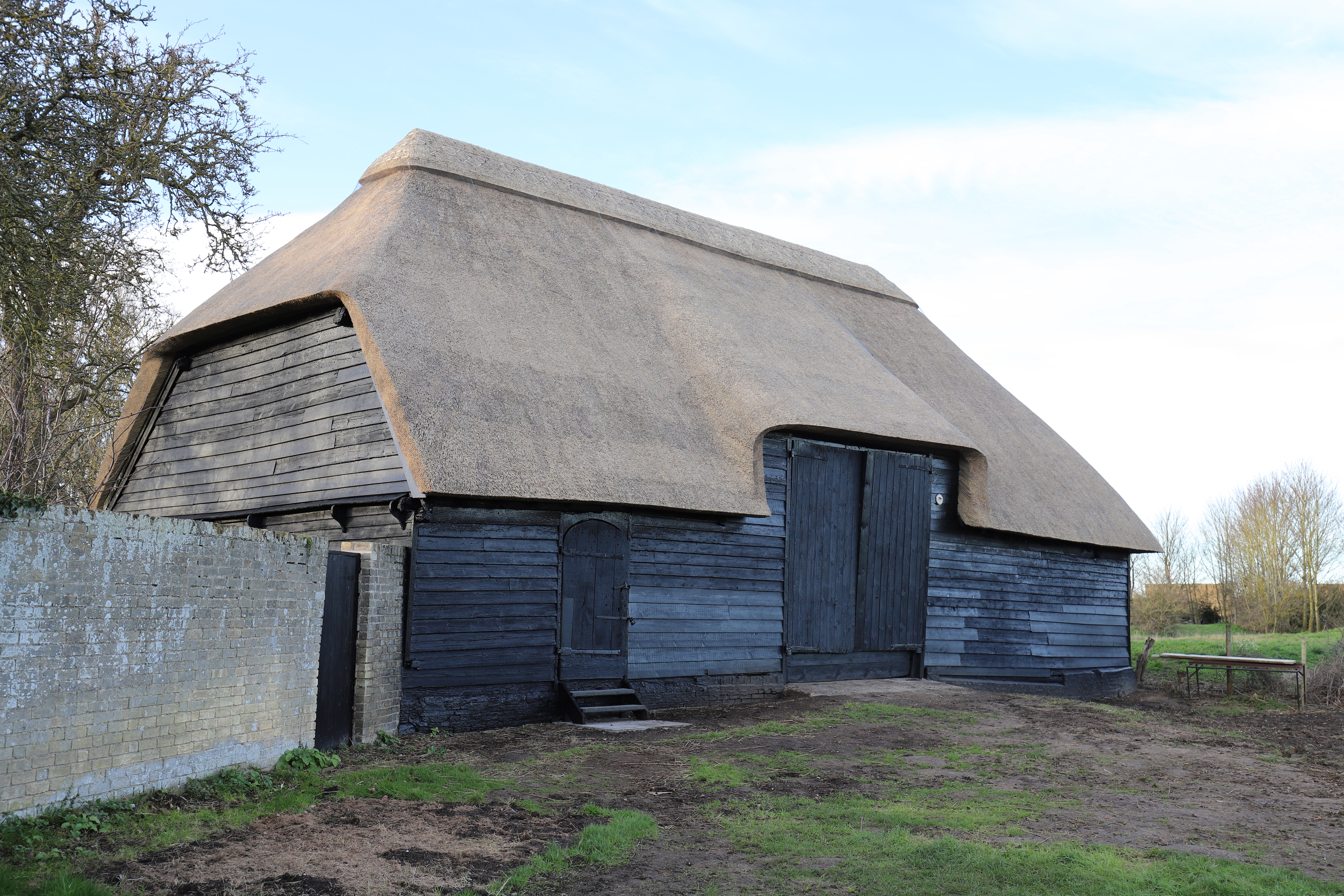
Landbeach Tithe Barn

Landbeach Tithe Barn was constructed in the sixteenth century, or possibly earlier, for the collection and storage of tithes paid by the villagers to the church. It is thatched, timber framed and weatherboarded, and is a grade II listed building. In 2016 the tithe barn was taken over by a charitable trust, which in 2019–20 renovated and rethatched the building. The tithe barn is used for village events.

== Village life ==
Landbeach has two churches (Anglican and Baptist), a village hall and an Indian restaurant (formerly The Slap Up public house). The nearest railway station is Waterbeach, on the Fen Line. The village lies close to the A10 road that links Cambridge to King's Lynn.

There were up to seven public houses in the village in the 19th century, of which none remain. These included The Black Bull which opened in the mid-18th century. The Black Bull, The Bower and The British Queen are now private houses and The Red Cow remains only in that a part of its tiled floor can be seen in the garden of one of the houses in the High Street. There is no remaining trace of The Windmill, The Coach and Horses, The Queen Adelaide or The Bricklayers Arms. By the 1960s only The Slap-Up, which opened in around 1860 on the Cambridge to Ely turnpike (now the A10) remained, but this is now a restaurant.

Within the parish boundary, but outside the residential area, is Cambridge Research Park, on the site of the former Landbeach Marina, itself a flooded former gravel pit.

== Nearby villages ==
- Chittering
- Waterbeach
- Milton
- Cottenham

== Notable residents ==
- William Gonell (fl.1518-1546), teacher, tutor to Thomas More's children; friend of Erasmus
- William Ward (1534–1604?), physician and translator.
- Henry Clifford (1576-1628), member of the Clifford family of bankers and merchants
- Jack Ravensdale (1920–1994), historian and author, lived locally from 1971

== See also ==
- List of places in Cambridgeshire
