= Bill Ward (footballer, born 1901) =

Australian rules footballer

Personal information
- Full name: William Arthur Ward
- Born: 30 March 1901; Cheltenham, Victoria
- Died: 24 April 1969 (aged 68); Prahran, Victoria
- Original team: Brighton

Playing career^{1}
Years	Club	Games (Goals)
1922–1923	St Kilda	7 (4)
- ^{1} Playing statistics correct to the end of 1923.

William Arthur Ward (30 March 1901 – 24 April 1969) was an Australian rules footballer who played with St Kilda in the Victorian Football League (VFL).

Ward later served in the Australian Army during World War II.
