= RAF Waterbeach =

Former Royal Air Force station in England

RAF Waterbeach
- Waterbeach, Cambridgeshire in England
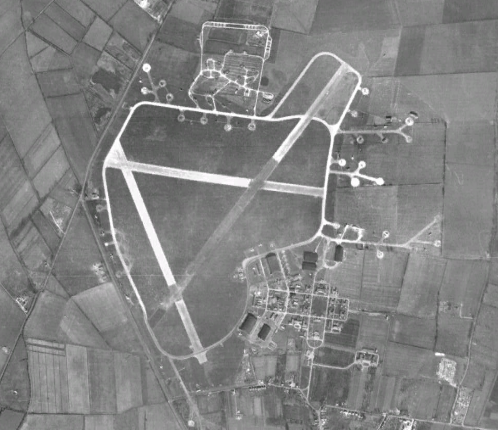
- 1945 aerial photograph

Site information
- Type: Royal Air Force station
- Owner: Ministry of Defence
- Operator: Royal Air Force
- Controlled by: RAF Bomber Command (1941-45) * No. 3 Group RAF; RAF Transport Command (1945-50); RAF Fighter Command (1950-) * No. 11 Group RAF; RAF Training Command * No. 38 Group RAF

Location
- Shown within Cambridgeshire RAF Waterbeach (the United Kingdom)
- Coordinates: 52°16′28″N 000°11′24″E
- Grid reference: TL495665

Site history
- Built: 1940
- In use: 11 January 1941 - 2013
- Battles/wars: European theatre of World War II; Cold War

Airfield information
- Elevation: 10 metres (33 ft) AMSL
Runways
Direction	Length and surface
04/22	6,070 feet (1,850 m) Asphalt
10/28	4,140 feet (1,262 m) Asphalt
16/34	4,250 feet (1,295 m) Asphalt

Royal Air Force Waterbeach or more simply RAF Waterbeach is a former Royal Air Force station located in Waterbeach, Cambridgeshire which is about 5.5 miles (8.9 km) north of Cambridge, England. The site was transferred to the Royal Engineers, part of the British Army, in 1966, as Waterbeach Barracks.

== History ==
=== Royal Air Force ===
The airfield was built in 1940 on the northern edge of Waterbeach village and operated under the control of RAF Bomber Command. The original control tower and many RAF buildings, including several hangars, are still present.

==== RAF units and aircraft – Bomber Command, WW2 ====
Years	Unit	Aircraft	Variant	Notes
1941-1942	No. 99 Squadron RAF	Vickers Wellington	Ic, II	
1941-1942	No. 26 Conversion Flight RAF	Short Stirling	I	On 2 January 1942 it was upgraded to form 1651 CU
1942–1943	No. 1651 Conversion Unit RAF	Short Stirling	I, III	
1942	214 Squadron Conversion Flight RAF	Short Stirling	I	Two short stays April–May and August–October 1942
1943	No. 1665 Heavy Conversion Unit RAF	Short Stirling	I	
1943	No. 1678 Heavy Conversion Unit RAF	Avro Lancaster	II	The training unit for No. 514 Squadron RAF
1943-1945	No. 514 Squadron RAF	Avro Lancaster	I, II and III	

==== Transport Command, 1945-1949 ====
After the Second World War, Consolidated Liberators and Douglas Dakotas from RAF Transport Command flew from RAF Waterbeach.

==== RAF units and aircraft – Transport Command ====
Years	Unit	Aircraft	Variant	Notes
1945-1946	No. 59 Squadron RAF	Consolidated Liberator	B, C and GR	Carrying troops to and from India and the Far East
1945-1946	No. 220 Squadron RAF	Consolidated Liberator	C Mk V, VI and VIII	
1946	1552 (BABS) Flight RAF	Airspeed Oxford		Training in Beam Approach Beacon System, March–July
1946-1947	No. 51 Squadron RAF	Avro York	C.1	
1947–1949	No. 77 Squadron RAF	Douglas Dakota		Participated in Operation Plainfare, the Berlin Airlift
1947–1949	No. 62 Squadron RAF	Douglas Dakota		Participated in Operation Plainfare, the Berlin Airlift
1947–1949	No. 53 Squadron RAF	Douglas Dakota		Participated in Operation Plainfare, the Berlin Airlift
1947-1950	No. 18 Squadron RAF	Douglas Dakota		Participated in Operation Plainfare, the Berlin Airlift
1949-1950	No. 24 Squadron RAF	Avro Lancastrian; Douglas Dakota; Avro York	C.2; C Mk IV; C Mk I	Participated in Operation Plainfare and then European scheduled services

==== Fighter Command, 1950-1963 ====
RAF Fighter Command took over the base on 1 March 1950 and used Gloster Meteors, Supermarine Swifts, de Havilland Venoms, de Havilland Vampires and Gloster Javelins. In addition Hawker Hunter fighters arrived in May 1955 and, two years later, the prototype English Electric P1 (Lightning) visited RAF Waterbeach.

==== RAF units and aircraft – Fighter Command ====
Years	Unit	Aircraft	Variant	Notes
1950-1959	No. 56 Squadron RAF	Gloster Meteor; Supermarine Swift; Hawker Hunter	F4 and F8; F1 and F2; F5 and F8	27 Meteor F4s from RAF Thorney Island arrived on 10 May 1950
1950-1958	No. 63 Squadron RAF	Gloster Meteor; Hawker Hunter	F4 and F8; F6a	
1955-1957	No. 253 Squadron RAF	de Havilland Venom de Havilland Vampire	NF2a; T11	
1957-1958	No. 153 Squadron RAF	Gloster Meteor; Gloster Javelin	NF12 and 14; FAW 7 and 9	
1958-1961	No. 25 Squadron RAF	Gloster Meteor; Gloster Javelin	NF12 and 14; FAW 7 and 9	
1959-1961	No. 46 Squadron RAF	Gloster Javelin	FAW 2	
1961-1962	No. 64 Squadron RAF	Gloster Javelin	FAW 9	
1961-1963	No. 1 Squadron RAF	Hawker Hunter	F6 and FGA9	
1961-1963	No. 54 Squadron RAF	Hawker Hunter	FGA9	Hunter XG264 was the last to leave RAF Waterbeach for RAF West Raynham on 8 August 1963

After the last RAF fixed-wing aircraft, from No. 54 Squadron RAF, left in August 1963, the site was used by the Airfield Construction Branch RAF until 1966.

=== Royal Engineers ===
In 1966 the station and airfield remained the property of the Ministry of Defence, but was transferred from the Royal Air Force to the Royal Engineers, part of the British Army, as Waterbeach Barracks. Until the closure of nearby RAF Oakington in the early 1970s, the main runway at Waterbeach remained active, along with the control tower, and was used as a relief landing ground for Varsities used in the advanced pilot training role. The former airfield was used as a training area for troops, with occasional visits by helicopters and, in the past, by the Hawker Siddeley Harrier.

== See also ==
- List of former Royal Air Force stations
