= William D. Ward =

American politician

William D. Ward was an American politician.

From St. Lucie County, Florida (1844-1855), Ward served in the Florida House of Representatives in 1846.
