= Bill Ward (rugby union) =

Welsh rugby union player (1907–1973)

- Full name: William Stanford Ward
- Born: 6 January 1907 Risca, Wales
- Died: 22 November 1973 (aged 66) Risca, Wales

Rugby union career
- Position: Second row
International career
Years	Team	Apps	(Points)
1934	Wales	2	(0)

William Stanford Ward (6 January 1907 – 22 November 1973) was a Welsh international rugby union player.

Born in Risca, Ward was capped twice for Wales as a second rower in the 1934 Home Nations. After Wales were soundly beaten by England in the opening fixture, Ward was one of four uncapped forwards introduced against Scotland at Murrayfield and helped them claim a 13–6 win, which was followed by a rout of Ireland at St Helens.

Ward played his club rugby for Cross Keys RFC.

== See also ==
- List of Wales national rugby union players
