= Robert Masters (historian) =

English clergyman

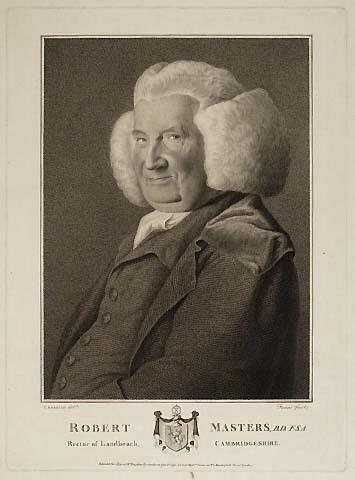
- Robert Masters, 1814 engraving by George Facius after Thomas Kerrich.
- Born: 1713; Hetherset, Norfolk
- Died: 5 July 1798
- Occupations: clergyman, historian
- Known for: Fellow of the Society of Antiquaries

Robert Masters (1713–1798) was an English clergyman and academic, known as the historian of Corpus Christi College, Cambridge.

== Life ==
Born at Hetherset, Norfolk, he was descended from William Master of Cirencester. He was admitted to Corpus Christi College in 1731; graduated B.A. in 1734, M.A. in 1738, B.D. in 1746; and was fellow and tutor of the college from 1738 to 1750. On 14 May 1752, he was elected Fellow of the Society of Antiquaries. He continued to reside in college till he was presented by that society to the rectory of Landbeach, Cambridgeshire, in 1756. Matthias Mawson, bishop of Ely, collated him to the vicarage of Linton, which he resigned for that of Waterbeach in 1759. This latter benefice he with the bishop's permission resigned in 1784 to his son William, for whom he built a house.

Masters was in the commission of the peace for Cambridgeshire, and acted as deputy to William Compton, LL.D., chancellor of the diocese of Ely, who resided abroad. In 1797, he resigned the living of Landbeach in favour of Thomas Cooke Burroughes, senior fellow of Caius College, who, immediately upon his presentation, married Mary, Masters's second daughter. Masters continued to reside in the parsonage with his son-in-law and daughter until his death on 5 July 1798. He was buried at Landbeach, where a monument was erected to his memory.

== Works ==
His major work is: The History of the College of Corpus Christi and the Blessed Virgin Mary (commonly called Bene't) in the University of Cambridge, from its foundation to the present time. It was published in two parts by Cambridge University Press: the first part appeared in 1753, followed in 1755 by the second part, containing the lives of members of the college and an appendix of documents. An expanded edition by Dr. John Lamb appeared at Cambridge in 1831.

Masters's other works are:

- A List of the Names, Counties, Times of Admission, Degrees, &c., of all that are known to have been Members of Corpus Christi College in Cambridge (1749), and subsequently appended to the history of the college.
- "Some Remarks on Mr. Walpole's Historic Doubts on the Life and Reign of King Richard III", in Archaeologia, vol. 2 (1771), p. 198; also printed separately (London, 1772).
- Memoirs of the Life and Writings of Thomas Baker, B.D., of St. John's College in Cambridge, from the papers of Dr. Zachary Grey, with a Catalogue of his MS. Collections (Cambridge, 1784).
- "Account of some Stone Coffins and Skeletons found on making some alterations and repairs in Cambridge Castle", in Archaeologia, vol. 8 (1785), p. 63.
- "Account of an Antient Painting on Glass", representing the pedigree of the Stewart family, in Archæologia, vol. 8 (1787), pp. 321–5.
- Catalogue of the Pictures in the Public Library and Colleges in the University of Cambridge [1790].
- A Short Account of the Parish of Waterbeach, in the Diocese of Ely, by a late Vicar (1795), with a sketch of Denny Abbey; for private circulation.
- "Collectanea de Landbeach", in the archives of Corpus Christi College, Cambridge.

== Family ==
About 1757, Masters married a granddaughter of one of his predecessors at Landbeach, and daughter of John Cory, rector of Impington and Waterbeach. She died on 29 August 1764, leaving a son William, who died rector of Waterbeach in 1794, and two daughters: Anne, married to the Rev. Andrew Sprole; and Mary, wife of the Rev. T. C. Burroughes.
