= Cottenham =

Village in Cambridgeshire, England

Coordinates: 52.2865°N 0.1244°E

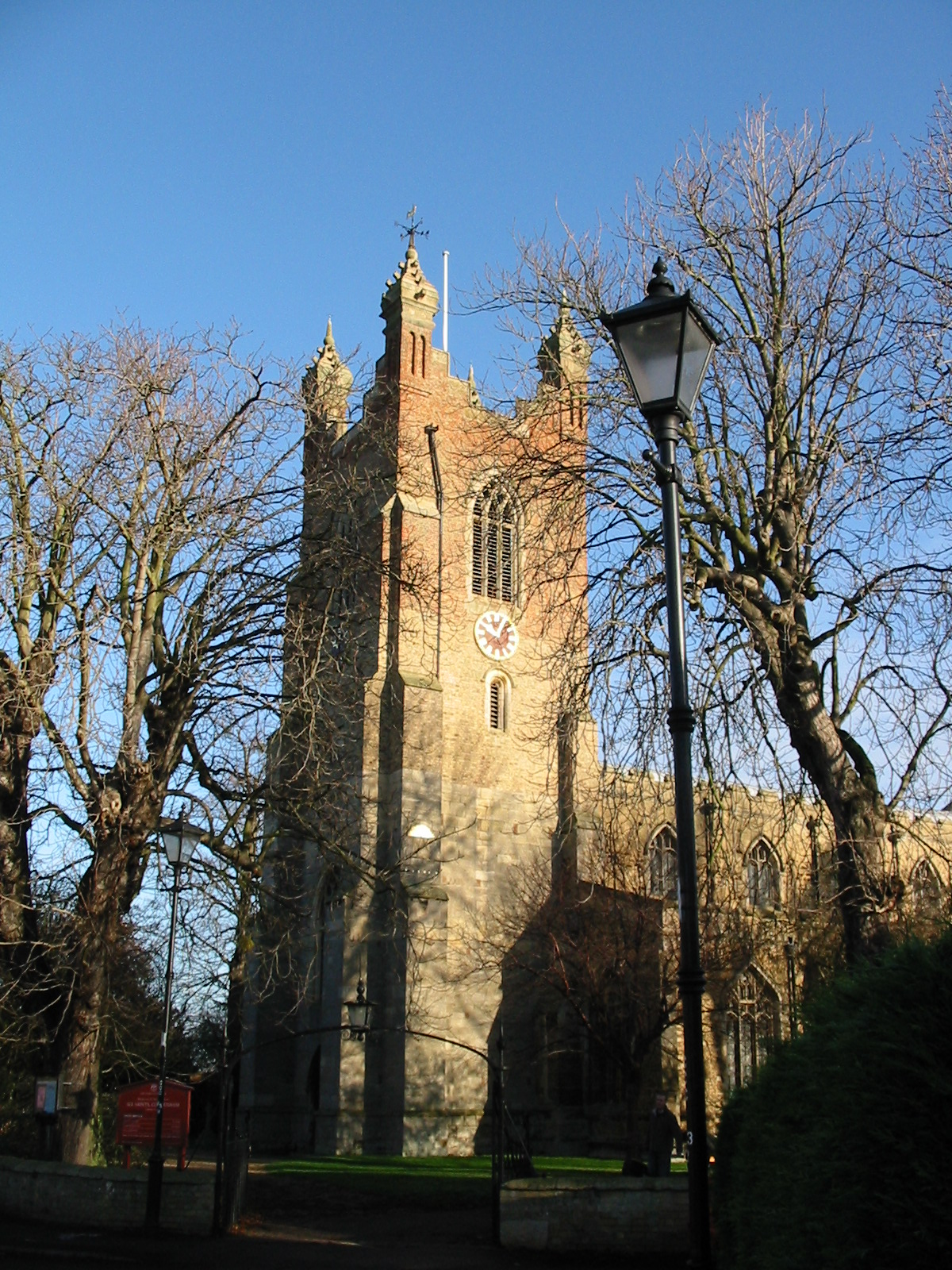
- All Saints' Church, Cottenham

- Location within Cambridgeshire
- Population: 6,095 (2011)
- OS grid reference: TL450675
- District: South Cambridgeshire
- Shire county: Cambridgeshire
- Region: East
- Country: England
- Sovereign state: United Kingdom
- Post town: CAMBRIDGE
- Postcode district: CB24, CB25
- Dialling code: 01954
- Police: Cambridgeshire
- Fire: Cambridgeshire
- Ambulance: East of England
- UK Parliament: South Cambridgeshire

Cottenham is a village in Cambridgeshire, England. Cottenham is one of the larger villages surrounding the city of Cambridge, located around five miles north of the city. The population of the civil parish at the 2011 Census was 6,095. Cottenham is one of a number of villages that make up the historical Fen Edge region in between Cambridge and Ely, which were originally settlements on the shore of the marshes close to the city of Cambridge, then an inland port.

== History ==
Much of Cottenham parish lies on a lower greensand ridge around 25 feet (8m) above sea level, which until the 17th century draining of the Fens was the only dry land in between Cambridge and the Isle of Ely around 12 miles to the north-east of the village. The southern side of the parish lies on raised fertile red loam, and the original village settlement is believed to have started as a Roman British island community taking advantage of fertile pasture at the edge of the marshland in between Cambridge and Ely. The growth into a permanent medieval village is thought to have begun from a nucleus of houses defined by High Street, Rooks Street and Denmark Road, a suggestion supported by excavations off Denmark Road and High Street conducted by the University of Cambridge in 1997. The lowest part of the parish lies below 15 feet (4.5m) at Smithy Fen in the north of the village, with the remnants of excavated peat beds still present there.

As part of an extensive fenland region, Cottenham is drained by a system of ditches and lodes which are believed to have been built or at least significantly expanded by the Romans. The northern regions of the parish drain into the Roman Car Dyke, a large drainage ditch which traverses the Fens in between the River Cam and the River Great Ouse, and the central village drains into Cottenham Lode, one of the many Cambridgeshire Lodes used to connect villages to the River Great Ouse as it travelled towards The Wash. The north-east of the parish is bounded by a section of the major Roman road, Akeman Street.

The parish is recorded in the Domesday Book of 1086 as housing 60 tenants, however the population fluctuated until the 13th century when the parish boundaries became somewhat fixed and pastures were enclosed. River transportation along the River Great Ouse which lies to the north of the parish was extremely important throughout the Middle Ages, establishing Cottenham as a trade route in between Cambridge and the surrounding Fens, resulting in it becoming one of the largest villages in Cambridgeshire from the 11th century onwards. The primary road out of the village (now the B1049) travelled southwards to Histon and onwards to Cambridge. The main route into the Fens travelled north towards Wilburton, and was bisected by the River Great Ouse to the north of Cottenham. Access to Wilburton and Ely was via the Twenty Pence Ferry which crossed the River Great Ouse in between Setchel Fen and Chear Fen, now regions of farmland at the northernmost end of the parish. The ferry crossing was maintained until modern times when a floating toll bridge was opened in 1901, and then finally a County Council-built bridge across the Ouse was constructed in 1929.

The majority of houses became clustered on either side of the High Street, just over a mile in length and the main road into the city of Cambridge, resulting in Cottenham becoming a long village surrounded by parish pastures, with the village church built at the north of the High Street and the village green to the extreme south of the village. The long High Street and subsequent elongated geography of the village has led to two distinctive communities, the "Church End" and "Green End".

=== Great Fire of Cottenham ===
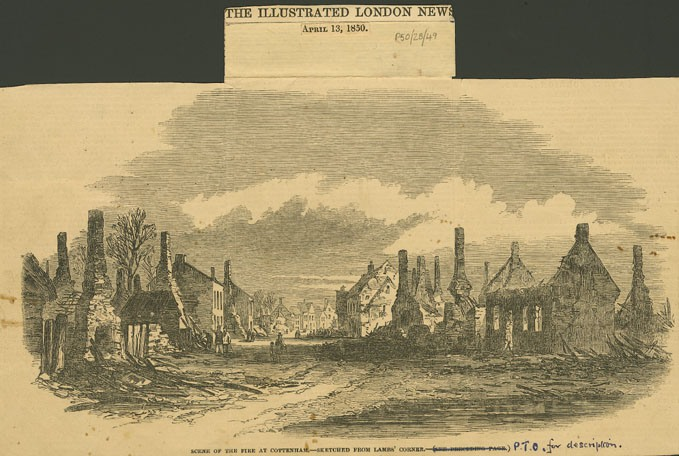
Damage caused by the fire of 1850, seen from Lamb's Lane Corner

Cottenham houses have a mix of architectural styles because few houses have survived the numerous fires which have destroyed most of the older buildings. On 29 April 1676 a fire destroyed over half of the buildings in the village, over a hundred houses. Only three dwellings from before 1676 survive today: 11 High Street, 279 High Street, and 41 Denmark Road. The fire that occurred on 4 April 1850 is known as the Great Fire, and started on the High Street. Forty to fifty cottages burnt down, as well as the Black Horse and White Horse inns and the Wesleyan Chapel, which was housed in a barn on what is now Telegraph Street. Smaller fires were recorded in 1827, 1847 and 1852, each of which destroyed at least ten dwellings.

=== Victorian Development ===
The village's population boomed throughout the early 19th century, rising from 1100 in 1801 to 2300 in 1851. The Inclosure Acts in 1847 saw a widespread programme of land ownership and road-building, resulting in improved road routes to Rampton, Oakington and Landbeach along with the creation of long and straight drove roads for livestock. Permanent drainage of the Fens by steam-powered pumping engines was authorised in 1842. These engines were later fuelled by oil and diesel before being converted to electricity in 1986. The size of the village resulted in comparatively early arrival of public services including a resident police constable from 1841, a post office from 1843 and street lamps from 1849. A typhoid outbreak in the 1850s resulted in a drive to improve the village clean water supply, which was achieved by the New Cottenham Gas and Water Company, who sank a deep well and converted a Rampton Road windmill into a water tower, which is still present today. The success of this scheme allowed for the introduction of piped water from 1903.

Proposals were drawn up for a light railway to assist in the export of goods such as fruit, wheat and cheese to Cambridge, but this was never built. The village's nearest railway stations for goods export were at Histon and Oakington, on the Cambridge and St Ives branch line. This line has now been converted into the Cambridgeshire Guided Busway, a rapid transit bus commuter service into Cambridge which maintains the original railway station stops.

== Transport ==
Cottenham is located on the B1049 road, linking to Cambridge and Wilburton. A shared pedestrian and cycle track links Cottenham and Histon, which is to be expanded towards Cambridge in 2018. Bus services link the village to Cambridge, Ely and to neighbouring Fen Edge villages.

== Amenities ==
As a relatively large village, Cottenham has numerous amenities including two GP surgeries, a dental surgery, public library, Co-operative store, pharmacy, butcher, bakery, greengrocers, two newsagents (one of which now incorporates the Post Office) a primary school, and a secondary school and adult education centre combined in Cottenham Village College. There are numerous other small businesses, organisations and charities present in the village. Cottenham has four remaining public houses: The Chequers, The Hop Bind, The Jolly Millers (temporarily closed) and The Waggon and Horses. Cottenham also has a fish and chip shop, as well as a curry house established in the former White Horse public house. The Cottenham Community Centre (CCC) and coffee shop is on the High Street on the site of the old Methodist church, opposite the Co-op.

== All Saints' Church ==
All Saints' Church is the Anglican parish church and is the largest major landmark in the village, located at the top of the High Street and visible from the surrounding fenland. The earliest documented evidence of a church in Cottenham is in a Charter of Saxon King Eadred in 948. This church was replaced by a Norman edifice in the 12th century, fragments of which can still be seen in the present building, which itself dates from the 15th century.

The church is in the decorated gothic and perpendicular styles consisting of chancel, nave, aisles, north and south porches and a 100-foot-tall tower with four pinnacles containing a clock and six bells. A storm destroyed all but the base of the original church steeple, which was rebuilt between 1617 and 1619. The building has undergone numerous refurbishments over the years, most notably in 1867 when the interior saw major restoration, and 1928 when the upper bell tower saw major repairs completed.

== Sport and recreation ==
The recreation ground is located off Lamb's Lane and is home to Cottenham United Football Club, Cottenham Cricket Club and a bowling green and tennis club. A social club was formed in 1965 to manage the facilities, overseeing the building of a new pavilion in 1974 and the extension of grounds in 1980.

The Village College provides a gymnasium, sports centre and field, 3G pitch and tennis courts for the community. The college is also home to the Cottenham Renegades, north Cambridge's only rugby-for-pleasure club; the team is also affiliated with The Cottenham Club.

=== Cottenham Racecourse ===
Horse riding is relatively popular in the parish, with numerous maintained bridleways and riding clubs. A racecourse lies directly to the east of the village at Mason's Pasture off Beach Road. The University of Cambridge horse racing clubs have been riding at Mason's Pasture since the late 18th century. The National Hunt Chase, now held at the Cheltenham Festival, was staged there in 1870 and 1877. A permanent course was laid out in the 1880s and the land bought by the parish in 1918, with the grandstand rebuilt in 1923. The racecourse was used for three point-to-point race meetings each year, usually in January, February and March, until its closure in 2020.

== Notable residents ==
Immigrant to the American colony of New England, John Coolidge, was born in Cottenham and baptised at All Saints' Church in September 1604. Among his many notable American descendants is US President J. Calvin Coolidge. The family home is believed to be the thatched cottage adjacent to All Saints’ Church. Calvin Coolidge contributed funds to the restoration of the church tower in 1928.

Ancestors of diarist Samuel Pepys lived in the village and his greatgrandfather acquired the manor of Cottenham. Other descendants of the Pepys family of Cottenham include Sir Richard Pepys and Charles Pepys, 1st Earl of Cottenham.

Thomas Tenison, Archbishop of Canterbury between 1694 and 1715, was born in Cottenham in 1636.

The Norwich City and Leeds United F.C. footballer Adam Drury was born in Cottenham.

== Cottenham village design statement ==
Cottenham was one of the first villages in the United Kingdom to produce a Village design statement. It was one of four pilot projects, the others being Stratford-on-Avon, Cartmel in Cumbria and Down Ampney in Gloucestershire. These were promoted as "exemplars", together with written guidance training and advice for other communities wishing to take up the initiative. The document was updated in 2007.

== Nearby villages ==
- Wilburton
- Rampton
- Willingham
- Oakington and Westwick
- Landbeach
- Histon and Impington
