= Thomas Baker (antiquarian) =

English antiquarian (1656–1740)

Thomas Baker (14 September 1656 in Lanchester, Durham – 2 July 1740) was an English antiquarian.

== Life ==
He was the grandson of Colonel Baker of Crook, Durham, who won fame in the English Civil War by his defence of Newcastle upon Tyne against the Scots. Thomas was educated at the free school at Durham, and went on to St John's College, Cambridge, where he later obtained a fellowship. Lord Crew, bishop of Durham, collated him to the rectory of Long Newton in his diocese in 1687, and intended to give him that of Sedgefield with a prebend had not Baker incurred his displeasure by refusing to read James II's Declaration of Indulgence. The bishop who himself was afterwards specially excepted from William III's Act of Indemnity.

Baker, though he had opposed James, refused to take the oaths to William; he resigned Long Newton on 1 August 1690, and retired to St John's, in which he was protected till 20 January 1716/1717, when he and twenty-one others were deprived of their fellowships. After the passing of the Registering Act in 1723, he could not be made to comply with its requirements by registering his annuity of £40, although that annuity, together with £20 per annum from his elder brother's collieries, was now his only income. Resentful of the injuries he had suffered, he inscribed himself in all his own books, as well as in those which he gave to the college library, socius ejectus, and in some rector ejectus. He continued to live in the college as commoner-master till his sudden death from apoplexy on 2 July 1740. He accumulated a significant library, of books and manuscripts, which was drawn on by contemporary scholars; after his death, it was largely dispersed, though a quantity of books were given to St John's.

== Works ==
The only works he published were Reflections on Learning, showing the Insufficiency thereof in its several particulars, in order to evince the usefulness and necessity of Revelation (London, 1709–1710) and the preface to Bishop Fisher's Funeral Sermon for Margaret, Countess of Richmond and Derby (1708)—both without his name. His manuscript collections on the history and antiquities of the university of Cambridge, amounting to 39 volumes in folio and three in quarto, were divided between the British Museum and the public library at Cambridge—the former getting twenty-three volumes, the latter sixteen in folio and three in quarto.

The life of Baker was written by Robert Masters (Cambridge 1784), and by Horace Walpole in the quarto edition of his works.

== Works ==
- History of the College of St. John the Evangelist, Cambridge Volumes 1 & 2, Reissued by Cambridge University Press 2009, ISBN 978-1-108-00367-4
