= Waterbeach =

Village in Cambridgeshire, England

Coordinates: 52.26642°N 0.19084°E

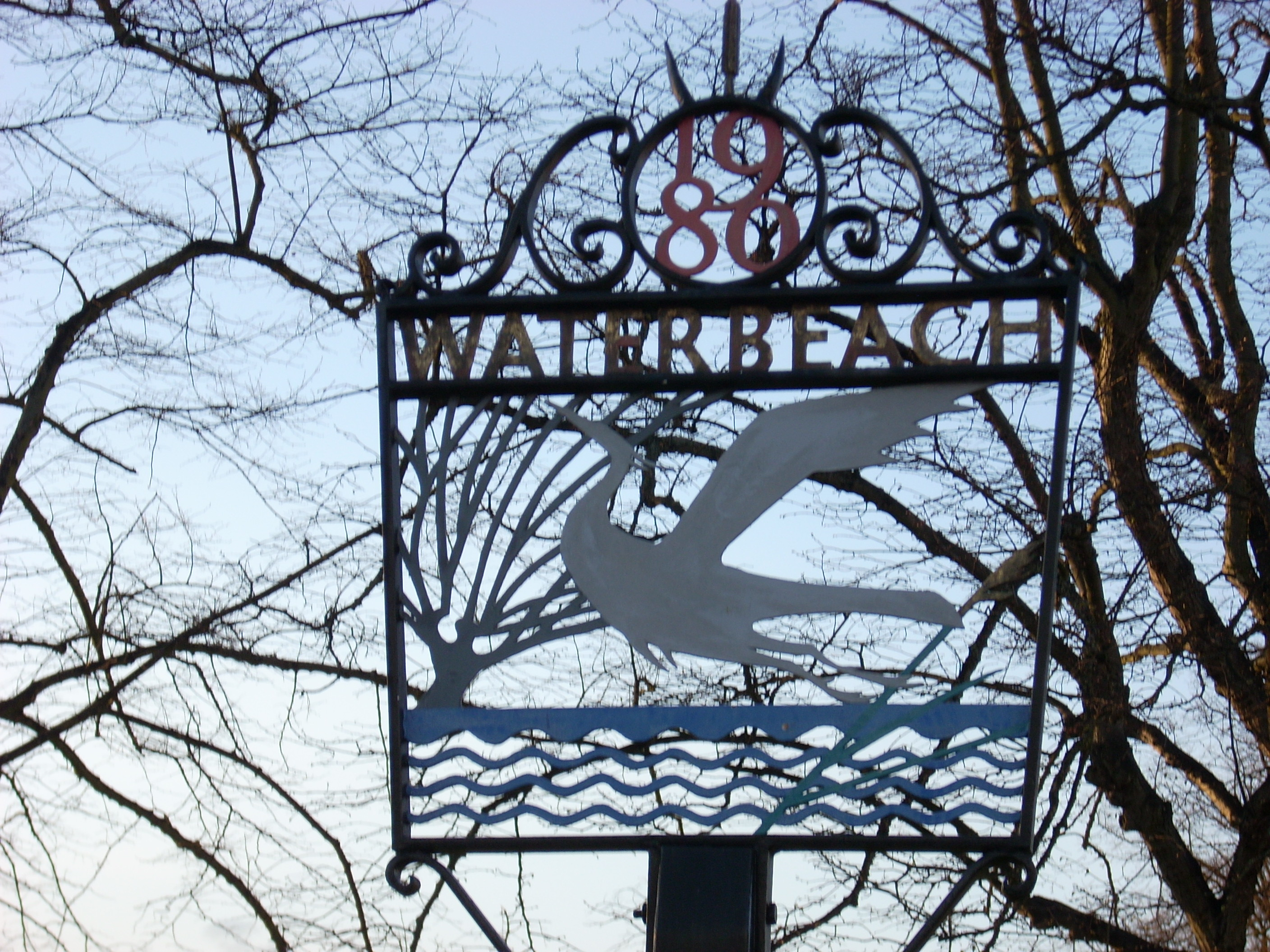
- Waterbeach village sign

- Location within Cambridgeshire
- Population: 5,166 (2011)
- OS grid reference: TL496654
- District: South Cambridgeshire
- Shire county: Cambridgeshire
- Region: East
- Country: England
- Sovereign state: United Kingdom
- Post town: CAMBRIDGE
- Postcode district: CB25
- Dialling code: 01223
- Police: Cambridgeshire
- Fire: Cambridgeshire
- Ambulance: East of England
- UK Parliament: Ely and East Cambridgeshire

Waterbeach is a village 6 miles (9.7 km) north of Cambridge on the edge of The Fens, in the South Cambridgeshire district of Cambridgeshire, England. It was designated a "new town" in 2018.

== History ==
=== Early periods ===
Waterbeach is on the Car Dyke, a Roman waterway traceable as far as Lincoln. Archaeological work in 2020 found a seemingly Roman settlement on the north side of the village.

Waterbeach appears in the 1086 Domesday Book as Vtbech. In the 12th century, the Knights Templar occupied Denny Abbey to the north of the village. The abbey structures and the area immediately surrounding it are protected as a scheduled monument. The core historic buildings of Denny Abbey are open to the public and managed by the Farmland Museum. Waterbeach Abbey and a stretch of the Car Dyke, both on the southern side of the village, are also scheduled monuments.

The attorney and parliamentarian John Yaxley acquired an estate at Waterbeach by 1610 and resided in the village. He and Edward Aungier of Cambridge bought the manors of Waterbeach and Causeway from the Crown for £900 in 1614.

=== RAF and British Army ===
A former Royal Air Force station, RAF Waterbeach, lies to the north of the village. Six aircraft hangars were built in 1940 and a triangle of hard runways completed in 1941. It housed some 2,600 people in the final months of the Second World War. Thereafter the station was run by RAF Transport Command and then by RAF Fighter Command until 1966, when it was transferred to the Royal Engineers and became Waterbeach Barracks, where the Waterbeach Military Heritage Museum opened in 1984. This was closed and the exhibits put into store in 2012, but in 2015 the museum returned and was officially reopened in 2017. The barracks themselves closed on 28 March 2013, after a move by all remaining units to RAF Kinloss in Scotland and to RAF Wittering in 2012–2013. The Cambridgeshire Army Cadet Force remains based in a corner of the old base. An industrial park now resides in the southwest corner of the airfield at the junction of the A10 and Denny End Road. It is known as 'Sterling House'.

=== 21st century ===
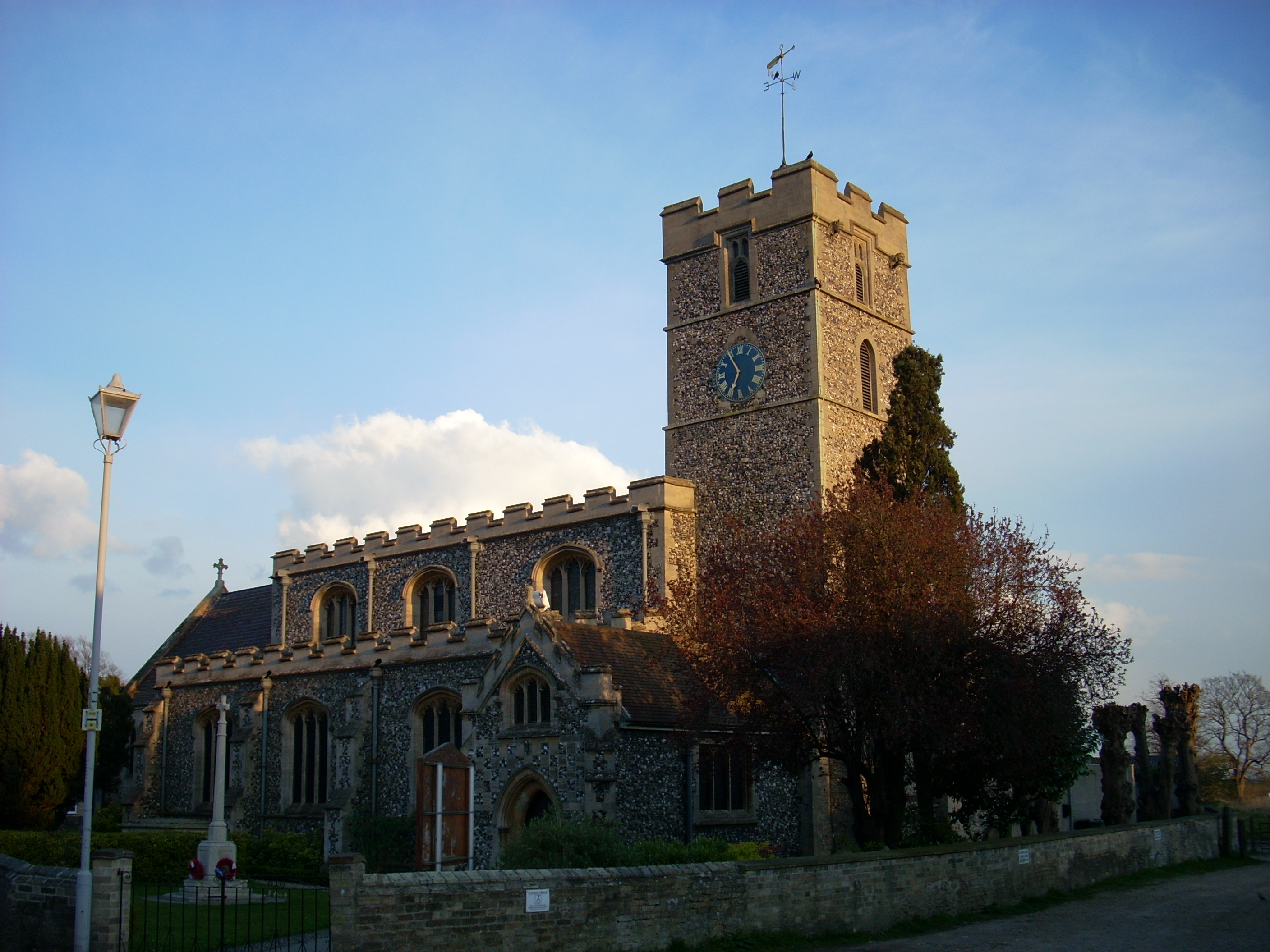
St John's Church

The population of Waterbeach has risen significantly since 2001, from 4,476 to some 5,500 in 2019, In 2018 it was designated a new town in the South Cambridgeshire Local Plan. The following year, permission came for the construction of 6,500 new dwellings. These are to be built on the site of the old barracks, and will more than double the population. In 2012 the Cambridge Innovation Park opened. The Innovation Park and adjacent Denny End Industrial Estate are major employment centres. In 2012 Milton Brewery moved from nearby Milton to a site at Denny End. Waterbeach Community Primary School was enlarged in 2020 to cater for some 400 pupils.

The three places of worship are the Anglican Church of St John the Evangelist, a Baptist church famous for ties with Charles Haddon Spurgeon, and a corps of the Salvation Army. Active community groups include Scouts and Girl Guides, the Army Cadet Force, playgroups and a play scheme, and a Community Association. To the south-east is a Woodland Trust nature area, Cow Hollow Wood, laid out in 2000 to mark the Millennium.

A site of the Conservators of the River Cam can also be found in Waterbeach.

=== Waterbeach ===
Waterbeach is a development on the site of the former Waterbeach barracks and airfield in the north of Waterbeach. The site, covering 293 hectares, was designated in the South Cambridgeshire Local Plan, adopted in 2018, as a strategic location for new housing. In 2017, an outline planning application was submitted by the Ministry of Defence and developer Urban&Civic for 6,500 homes on the site. A supplementary planning document for the area was adopted in early 2018.

In May 2019, South Cambridgeshire District Council resolved to grant outline planning permission for the project, which is planned to also include 16,500 square meters of retail space, 15,000 square meters of employment space, three primary schools, a secondary school, community and health facilities, a hotel, and open space.

The first residents began moving into the development in 2022. A new railway station is planned to replace the existing Waterbeach station in 2027, relocating it 1.5 miles (2.4 kilometers) north to better serve the new development.

In addition to this new development, the village of Waterbeach is now being renamed to Waterbeach Village

== Culture ==
=== Public art ===
In 1980, a village sign was made, as a memorial to the local doctor John Pritchard, who had been the village's GP for more than 20 years. The sign was designed by the artist Nan Youngman, who also lived in Waterbeach, and it was made by the blacksmith Richard Gowing's workshop in Soham, East Cambridgeshire.

== Transport ==
Waterbeach railway station, on the Fen Line between Cambridge and King's Lynn, had its platforms extended in 2020. A proposal to move the station closer to the development at the Barracks was approved by the local planning committee in 2018, but this has not yet been completed..

The village lies close to the London–King's Lynn A10 road. It has bus services linking it to Cambridge, Landbeach, Ely, Littleport and Stretham.

== Notable people ==
In birth order:

- Richard Jugge (died 1577), a Royal Printer generally credited with inventing the footnote, was probably born in Waterbeach.
- Robert Masters (1719–1798), a writer, historian and cleric, served as Rector of Waterbeach in 1775–1784.
- William Keatinge Clay (1797–1867), an antiquary and cleric, served as Rector of Waterbeach from 1854 until he died in 1867.
- Charles Haddon Spurgeon (1834–1892), the eventual Baptist Pastor of London's Metropolitan Tabernacle, served first at Waterbeach Baptist Church, when he was 17 years old. (He would later remember his tenure there as he sent out many preachers to rural communities.)
- David Stafford-Clark (1916–1999), a psychiatrist, poet and author, served with the RAF Bomber Command at Waterbeach in the Second World War.
- Terry Hale (born 1936), a player for Cambridgeshire County Cricket Club (1957–1978), was born in Waterbeach.

== See also ==
- List of places in Cambridgeshire

== Bibliography ==
- John F. Hamlin and Oliver J. Merrington (2011 and 2014), At the Beach: the story of Royal Air Force Waterbeach and Waterbeach Barracks, Peterborough: GMS Enterprises (available at Waterbeach Military Heritage Museum) ISBN 1-904514-63-4
- William Keatinge Clay (1852), A History of the Parish of Waterbeach in the County of Cambridge, Cambridge: Deighton Bell (Cambridge Antiquarian Society, Octavo series, Vol. 4)
- Robert Masters (1795), A Short Account of the Parish of Waterbeach: in the Diocese of Ely, London
