= Cambourne =

Town in Cambridgeshire, England

Coordinates: 52.22°N 0.07°W

- Location within Cambridgeshire
- Interactive map of Cambourne
- Population: 12,081 (2021 Census)
- OS grid reference: TL318598
- Civil parish: Cambourne
- District: South Cambridgeshire
- Shire county: Cambridgeshire
- Region: East
- Country: England
- Sovereign state: United Kingdom
- Post town: CAMBRIDGE
- Postcode district: CB23
- Dialling code: 01954
- Police: Cambridgeshire
- Fire: Cambridgeshire
- Ambulance: East of England
- UK Parliament: St Neots and Mid Cambridgeshire

Cambourne is a town and civil parish in Cambridgeshire, England, in the district of South Cambridgeshire. It is a planned development and lies on the A428 road between Cambridge, 9 miles (14 km) to the east, and St Neots and Bedford to the west. It comprises the four areas of Great Cambourne, Lower Cambourne, Upper Cambourne, and West Cambourne. The area is close to Bourn Airfield.

Cambourne is the largest settlement in South Cambridgeshire, with a population of 12,350 in the 2021 UK census.

== History ==
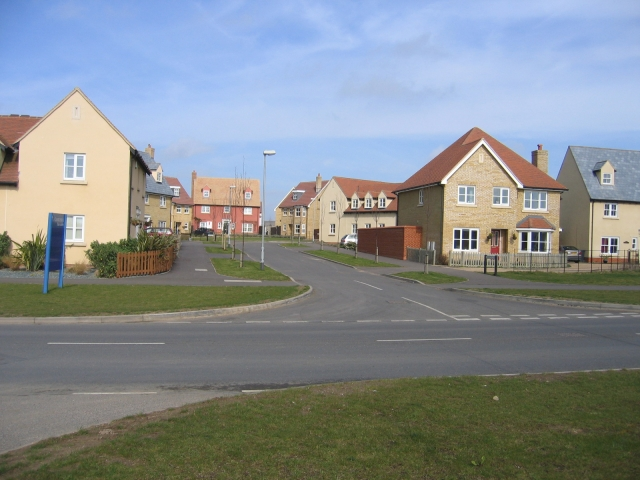
Housing typical of Cambourne

As part of plans to build thousands of new homes in the south-east of England, a new settlement on 400 hectares (990 acres) of former agricultural land, 9 miles (14 km) west of Cambridge, was considered in the late 1980s. In 1994, the Section 106 agreement from the Town and Country Planning Act 1990 was completed by the developers (McA), the local authority, Cambridgeshire County Council and the developers together with the landholders. The new settlement was to be constructed by three of Britain's larger builders of housing developments, Bovis Homes, Bryant Homes and Taylor Wimpey. Planning permission for the development at Monkfield Park was given in November 1996, and construction began in June 1998, on what was previously farmland.

In 2008, work began on building Upper Cambourne, with an original estimated completion date of 2012. The existing planning permission allowed 3,300 homes in the development. On 3 October 2011, planning permission was granted for a further 950 homes. This was set to take building work up to approximately 2016, and complete Upper Cambourne. In January 2017 outline planning consent was granted for a further 2,350 homes to the west of Lower Cambourne.

Cambourne was initially going to be named Monkfield after the name of the original farm, which is commemorated by a Monkfield Lane in Great Cambourne and the village pub, The Monkfield Arms. However, the name of the community was eventually created from the names of Cambridge, the nearest city, and Bourn, a nearby village.

The South Cambridgeshire (Parishes) Order 2004 created the new civil parish of Cambourne from 1 April 2004, and changed the boundaries of the Bourn parish. In March 2019 the parish council declared the parish to be a town, allowing the council to adopt the name Cambourne Town Council.

== Amenities ==
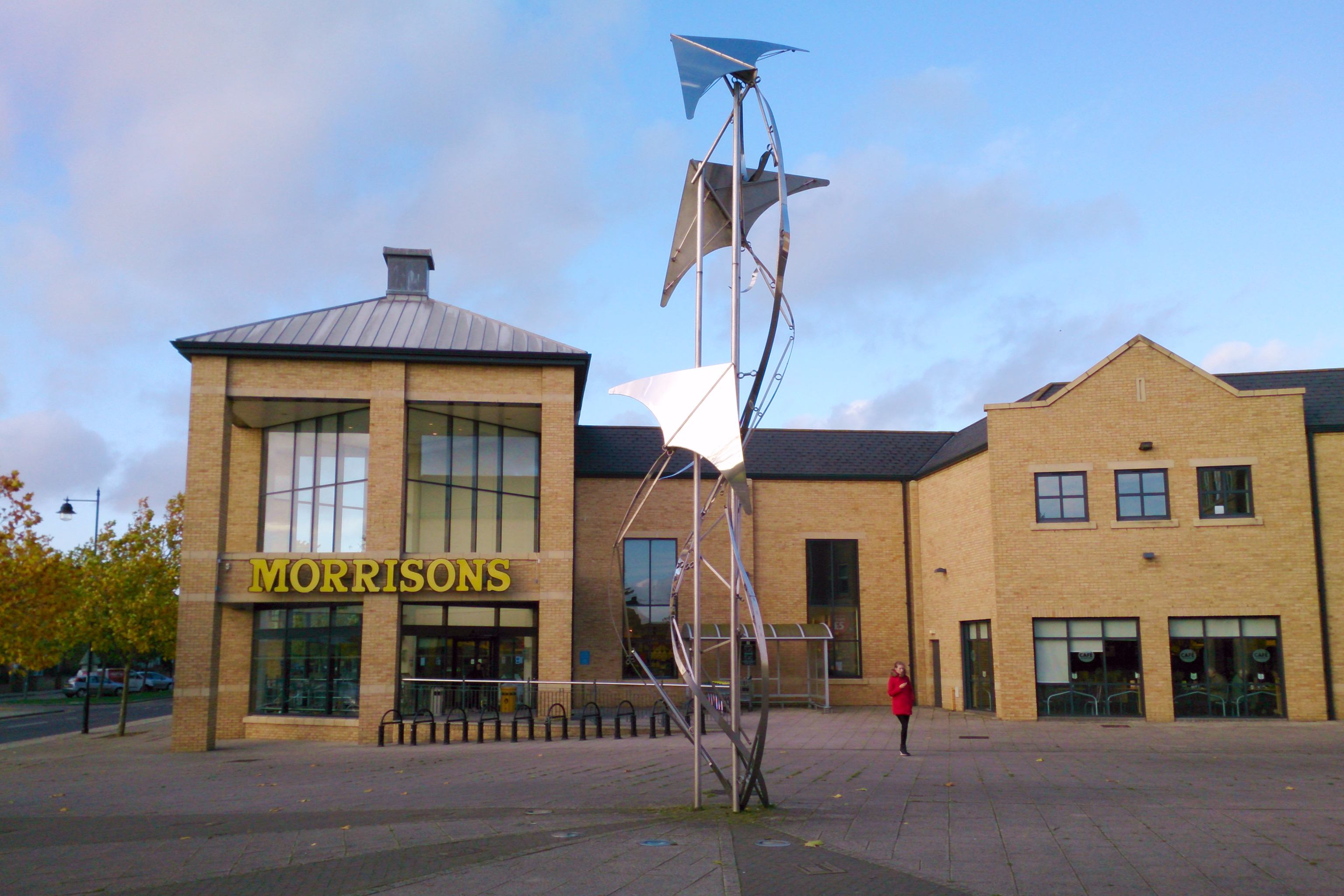
Morrisons supermarket and flight-themed sculpture commemorating the area's connections with the RAF and World War 2 aeroplane production

Some facilities were built in Cambourne as part of the initial development. These included a Morrisons supermarket and petrol station, a medical practice, a dentist, a veterinary practice, allotments, a pub and a hotel.

The High Street in Cambourne has been developed further with a takeaway and eat-in food outlets, estate agents, a bookmaker, a building society branch, a dry cleaner, and a pharmacy. In 2008, the local police force Cambridgeshire Constabulary announced the building of a new police station in the village, complementing the two other rural stations in Histon and Sawston, and two outposts at Melbourn and Linton, in South Cambridgeshire. Cambourne Police Station fully opened in September 2010.

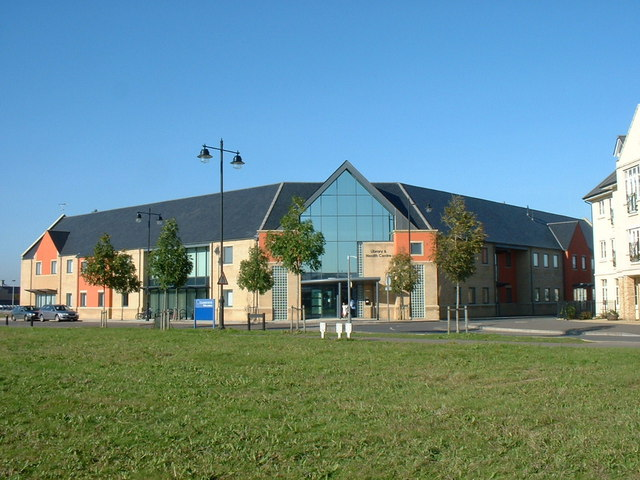
Cambourne library and health centre

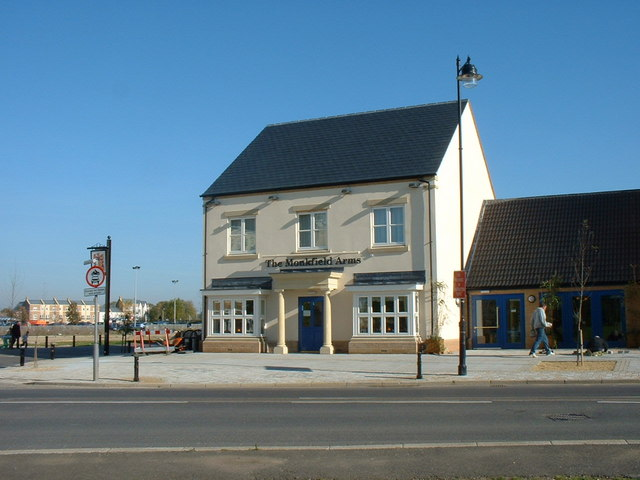
The Monkfield Arms, the village's pub

In May 2011, Cambourne Fire Station was completed on Back Lane, adjacent to the police station. There will however be no serving firefighters or fire engine until the Papworth Everard fire station is deemed no longer necessary. In June 2011, Cambridgeshire Fire and Rescue Service district staff for Cambridge City and South Cambridgeshire (managers, administrators, fire protection officers and community safety officers) moved into Cambourne Fire Station while the Parkside Fire Station in Cambridge is being redeveloped. In March 2012, Cambridgeshire Fire and Rescue Service relocated their High Volume Pump and Hose Layer Unit from Huntingdon to the Cambourne Fire Station. Retained firefighters from the nearby Papworth and Gamlingay stations are trained to use these vehicles as part of the UK's New Dimension programme.

Cambourne Business Park is located to the north east of Great Cambourne and is the home of South Cambridgeshire District Council, which relocated there in 2004. Environmental facilities include an educational eco park, which is home to a variety of plant, bird and mammal life, and a Country Park covering 80 acres (32 ha), partially opened in 2001, situated between Lower Cambourne and Great Cambourne.

== Sport ==
Various sports clubs are located in the villages, including football, rugby, tennis, netball and cricket clubs with their own pitches.

Cambourne cricket club was formed in 2003, but did not begin playing competitive cricket until 2006 due to delays to the delivery and maturity of playing facilities. The club has enjoyed a sustained period of growth since its inception, culminating in the award of ECB Clubmark status in 2008, which demonstrates proven higher levels of organisation, management, coaching and safety. As of 2026, the club has five adult teams playing in the Saturday CCA leagues as well as a Sunday and two midweek sides, six Colts teams playing in the CYCA leagues, and four girls and two women's sides playing in the Cambridge Women's and Girls' cricket leagues. Building work on a new pavilion in Lower Cambourne was completed in April 2007 and a second ground in Great Cambourne opened in August 2009 behind the church which allowed the club to enter a 3rd adult team into the league and presents further opportunity for growth.

The senior football club is Cambourne Rovers FC, whose Saturday side plays in the Cambridgeshire Football League BIS Division 1a. A reserve team also plays. CRFC is further represented by a Sunday league team, competing in the Halls of Cambridge Sunday League Division 4B.

The largest junior football club is called Cambourne FC, with a Soccer School for U6, an U7 team in playing in the Hunts Mini League, an U8 team, an U9 team, two U10 teams, and two U11 teams playing in the Cambs Mini League. The club also has an U12 and an U13 team playing in the Cambs Colts league.

Cambourne Exiles Rugby Club was formed in 2005 when some of the villagers decided to form a rugby-related social group. The first game was on 26 November 2005, against Saffron Walden 3. The team have grown to be a competent threes-level team. After the first season of friendly matches, in 2006 the team joined the Greene King Merit League.

A new sports pavilion was completed in September 2011 on the playing fields off Back Lane, Greater Cambourne. This has multi-changing facilities for the Football and Rugby pitches and a maintenance shed for the Parish Council. In November 2011, the second-floor bar was opened as Cambourne Sports and Social Club.

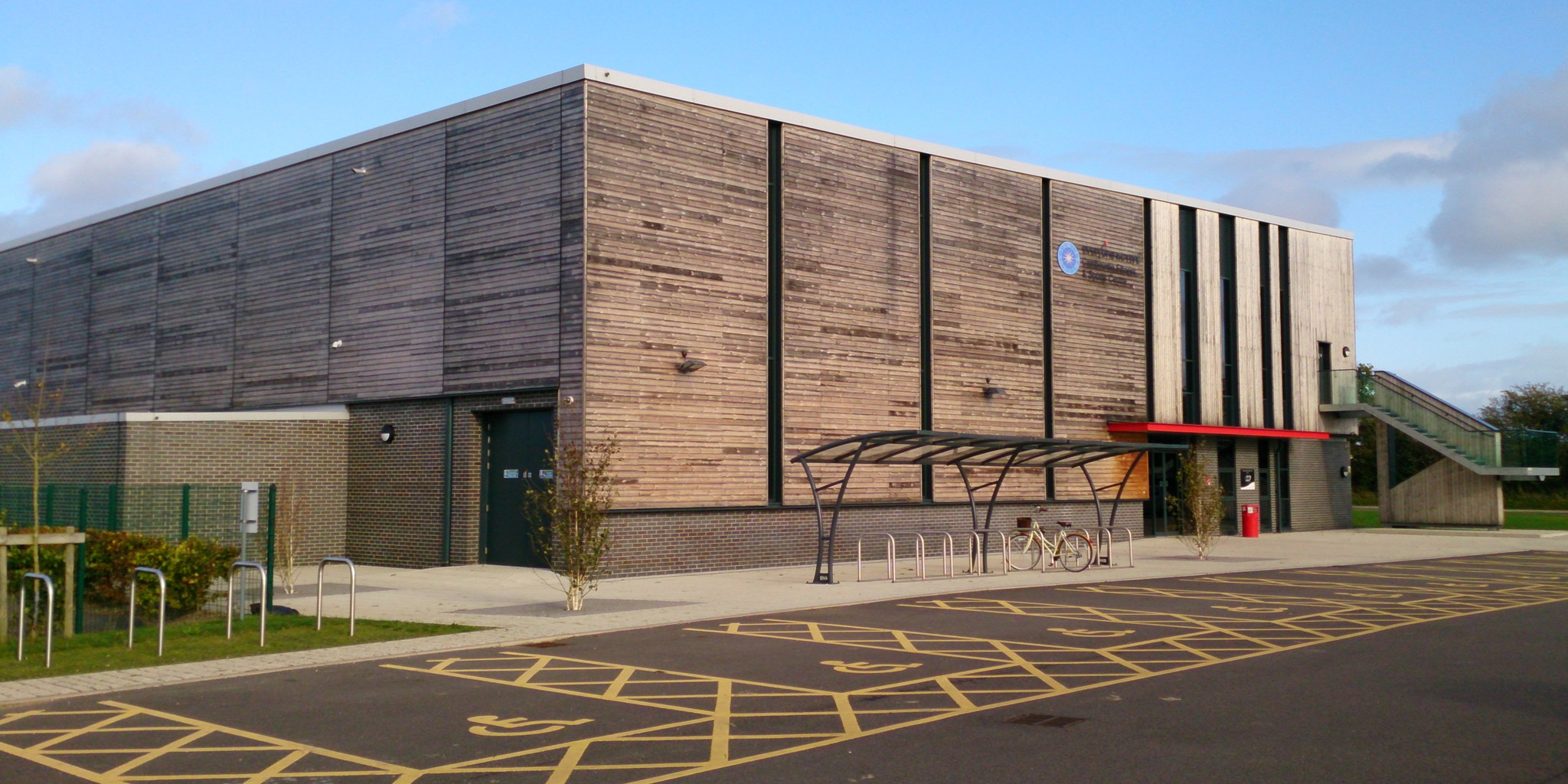
Cambourne Fitness and Sports Centre in October 2013

Cambourne Fitness and Sports Centre was officially opened on 4 December 2011 on Back Lane, Great Cambourne by England international footballer Darren Bent, Great British gymnast Beth Tweddle and Great British Paralympic swimmer Harriet Lee. Costing around £2 million it has a large sports hall, dance studio, juice bar and large gym. It is run by leisure firm Everyone Active with a profits share going to Cambourne Parish Council.

== Transport ==
The road transport network for the area has been developed further as a result of Cambourne's construction, with the extension of the dual-carriageway section of the A428. This new bypass opened in May 2007 and has moved much traffic from the single carriageway into Cambridge onto the new road. The route does not have a separate cycle lane, even though Cambridge has the highest levels of cycling in the UK, and South Cambridgeshire has the third highest cycling levels.

A bus service operates between Cambourne and Cambridge, with less-frequent services towards St Neots, Huntingdon and St Ives.

As of January 2021, the nearest railway station is located at St Neots. A railway station for Cambourne is planned for the new line between Oxford and Cambridge, which will also have a new station near Tempsford. This project has seen a funding of £5 billion from the British Government.

In 2020, the 'Cambourne West Consortium' gained consent to create a new bus-only roadway to connect Sterling Way in Upper Cambourne and Broadway, to substantially decrease the overall distance travelled by local bus services. (As of October 2020, the majority of services travel along St Neots Road, entering and leaving Cambourne via Cambourne Road.) The new bus gate would allow services such as the Stagecoach Citi 4 route to extend from School Lane to the new roundabout junction on the A1198, and then into Cambourne West. ECL Civil Engineering was appointed as the principal contractor to deliver the first phase of the Cambourne West Project infrastructure.

== Religion ==
In the 2021 national census, 50% of residents identified as undertaking activities of a religious faith. This is a 30% increase after a survey 15 years prior. The reason for this increase is unclear and could be due to many factors.

=== Christianity ===
From an early point in planning the new development of Cambourne, Christian church leaders expressed an interest in being involved in helping create the new community. The original Cambourne master plan included space for a church located at the east end of the High Street. This ultimately resulted in the Church of England, the Baptist Union of Great Britain, the Methodist Church of Great Britain, and the United Reformed Church working together to form the Local Ecumenical Partnership called Cambourne Church. In late 1999, as the first homes became occupied, the church was already open. The first full-time residential minister was appointed in early 2001. The waiting room of the doctor's surgery (now the dentist's) became the first meeting place. Before funds to build the permanent Church Centre were raised, an old Portakabin classroom was reconditioned by local residents and placed on the corner of Eastgate and Jeavons Lane opposite the planned Church site. It became the first community building available for Cambourne residents, opening as The Ark in 2002. This quickly became home to a wide variety of community groups.

Phase one of building was completed at a cost of £1.1 million in late 2009 and officially opened by the Duke of Gloucester on 13 July 2010. The building has a tall, barn-like design, aiming to be accessible, welcoming and environmentally sustainable. The main hall accommodates up to 150 worshipers, as well as providing space for public and private events. In October 2019 the Annexe was opened offering a further space for worship, church groups and community events. As well as the Cambourne Church congregation, the Roman Catholic congregation also regularly meets in the church centre.

An Independent Baptist church Peacehaven Baptist Church, was started in 2006 and meets at the Cambourne Community Centre (The Hub). Christ Church Cambourne, a free evangelical church, meets at Hardwick & Cambourne Primary School every Sunday at 10:45AM.

=== Islam ===
According to the most recent census data, Islam is the second most practised religion in Cambourne, with 5.79% of the town’s population identifying as Muslim. The local Muslim community is known for its active engagement in civic life and its strong commitment to supporting the wider community through interfaith initiatives, charitable work, and social outreach programmes.

=== Hinduism ===
After Christianity, Hinduism is the third most numerous religion recorded , with 4.44%of the population being identifying as a Hindu.

== Schools ==
Cambourne has a higher birth rate than many other places in the South Cambridgeshire area. Four primary schools and a secondary school have been built in the area, to ensure that pupils do not have to take buses to schools in Hardwick and other villages in the local area. The first of the schools to be built was Monkfield Park Primary School in Great Cambourne, followed by The Vine Inter-Church School in Upper Cambourne and a temporary Jeavons Wood Primary School in Great Cambourne. In June 2011, work began on a new permanent building for the Jeavons Wood Primary School, situated 100 yards from the temporary site on Eastgate, Great Cambourne. When the Jeavons Wood School vacated the temporary buildings, it re-opened as a fourth primary school, which was operated as a second campus of Hardwick and Cambourne Community Primary School. This school relocated to a permanent campus on Sheepfold Lane in September 2015.

In June 2011, Cambridgeshire County Council held a public exhibition of the plans for 'A Secondary School for Cambourne'. Plans were approved in January 2012. Cambourne Village College opened in September 2013 in the north-west of Lower Cambourne. Previously, primary schools in the area were in the catchment for Comberton Village College. A coach also transports several children in the village to and from St Bede's Inter-Church School in Cambridge.

A new Sixth Form College opened on the site of the secondary school in September 2024, being incorporated in to the Cam Academy Trust.

== Youth work ==
Cambourne has a large population of young people, due in part to the very high birth rate over a number of years, but also as a result of families moving into the town. In Cambourne's early years, Cambourne Youth Partnership was set up as a charity to bring together those working with young people across the town. Cambourne Youth Partnership operates out of Cambourne Soul, a youth centre facility in Great Cambourne, and currently partners with Romsey Mill to provide both universal and targeted youth services.

== Media ==
Local news and television programmes are provided by BBC East and ITV Anglia. Local radio stations are BBC Radio Cambridgeshire, Heart East, Cambridge 105, Greatest Hits Radio East, and Star Radio. The town is served by the local newspaper, Cambridge Independent. Cambourne Crier is a monthly magazine delivered free of charge to all residents across the town.

== Art, hobbies and culture ==
Cambourne has several art, hobbyist and cultural clubs and societies. Many of these which cater to specific interests of the community, such as painting, music, photography, gardening, etc. while others are broader in nature.

=== Cambourne Cultural Society ===
CCS was set up in 2010 with the vision of creating a platform for celebrating the culture, music and dance of the diaspora from the Indian subcontinent. It has now grown to over 100 members, with membership open to anyone who has an interest in the culture and arts of the sub-continent. The society members hold frequent gatherings, mostly for celebrating Indian festivals like Diwali, Navratri, etc, and featuring dance, music and food from the subcontinent.

=== Cambourne Crescent ===
Cambourne Crescent is a local charitable trust established in 2011.The charity works alongside the wider community to support organisations such as the Cambridge Food Bank, Jimmy's Charity, Arts and Minds Charity, and local schools. It also runs a Science and Technology Club aimed at engaging young people in STEM education.

During the COVID-19 pandemic, Cambourne Crescent played a vital role in community support efforts by initiating and coordinating the Cambourne Volunteers Task Force. This initiative, organised in collaboration with South Cambridgeshire District Council and Cambourne Town Council, mobilised local volunteers to provide essential services such as grocery and medicine deliveries, welfare checks, and support for vulnerable residents during lockdowns. The trust’s efforts during the crisis were widely recognised for fostering community resilience and solidarity at a challenging time.

== Geography ==
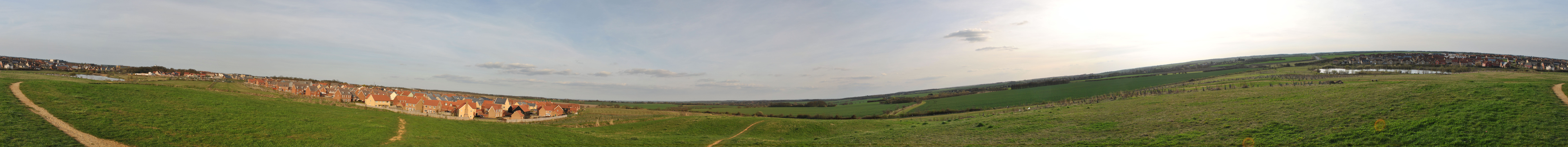
360° panoramic view of Cambourne from Crow Hill
