= Cambourne railway station =

Proposed railway station in Cambridgeshire, England

Cambourne

General information
- Location: Knapwell, Cambridgeshire; England
- Coordinates: 52.2274°N 0.0661°W (Indicative location, to be confirmed)
- Platforms: 2
Location
- Indicative location.

Cambourne railway station is a proposed new railway station to serve Cambourne in Cambridgeshire. It would be situated on the Bedford–Cambridge section of the proposed East West Rail Oxford–Cambridge line.

== Location ==
In March 2021, the East West Railway Company opened an 'informal consultation' on proposals for the route alignment of this section and thus the location of this station. Two sites were considered, one just south of the town and the other to the north, on the other side of the A428. In May 2023, the northern location was confirmed to be the preferred site of the new station, In April 2026, the East West Rail Company proposed a site in Knapwell civil parish, a little northeast of the Cambourne Rd/A428 junction.

== See also ==
- East West Rail#Central section
- Tempsford railway station
- Cambridge South railway station
