= Cambridge South railway station =

Station in Cambridge, England

Cambridge South
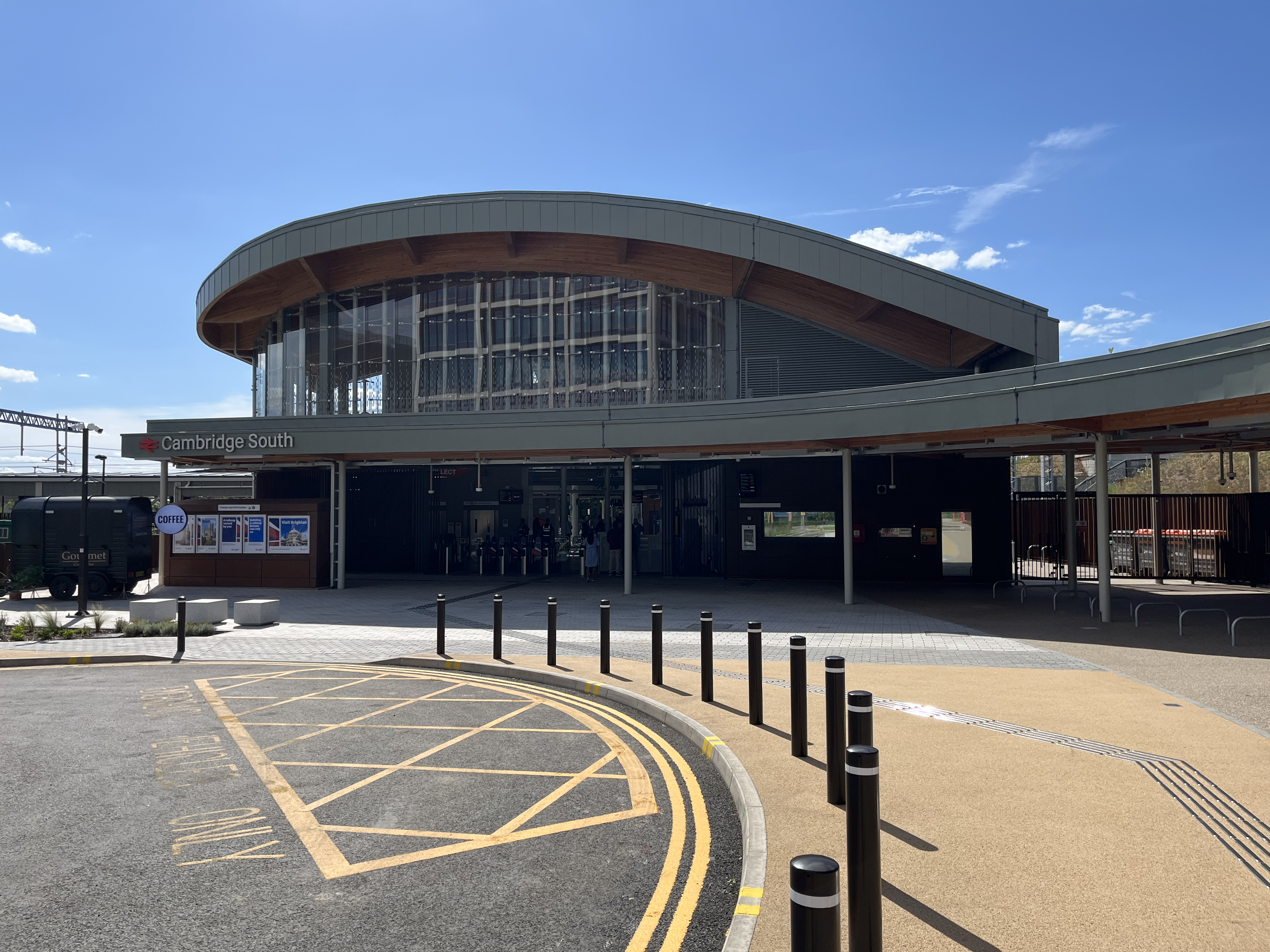
- East entrance on station opening day

General information
- Location: Cambridge Biomedical Campus; Cambridge; England
- Coordinates: 52.1741°N 0.1310°E
- Manager: Greater Anglia
- Platforms: 4

Other information
- Station code: CMS

Key dates
- January 2023: Construction began
- 28 June 2026: Station opened
Location

Cambridge South railway station is a railway station in the south of the city of Cambridge, England. It serves the Cambridge Biomedical Campus (which includes Addenbrooke's Hospital and AstraZeneca's headquarters) and the adjacent suburb of Trumpington. The station is located on the Cambridge line and the West Anglia Main Line, 2.3 km (1.4 miles) south of Cambridge railway station. It is one of three stations in Cambridge alongside the main station and Cambridge North, the latter of which opened in 2017.

The station was first proposed in 2017, and construction works started in 2023. It opened on 28 June 2026, and is the first station to carry the Great British Railways (GBR) branding. The station is managed by Greater Anglia and is also served by CrossCountry, Great Northern and Thameslink trains. All passenger trains call at the station.

== Background ==
=== History ===
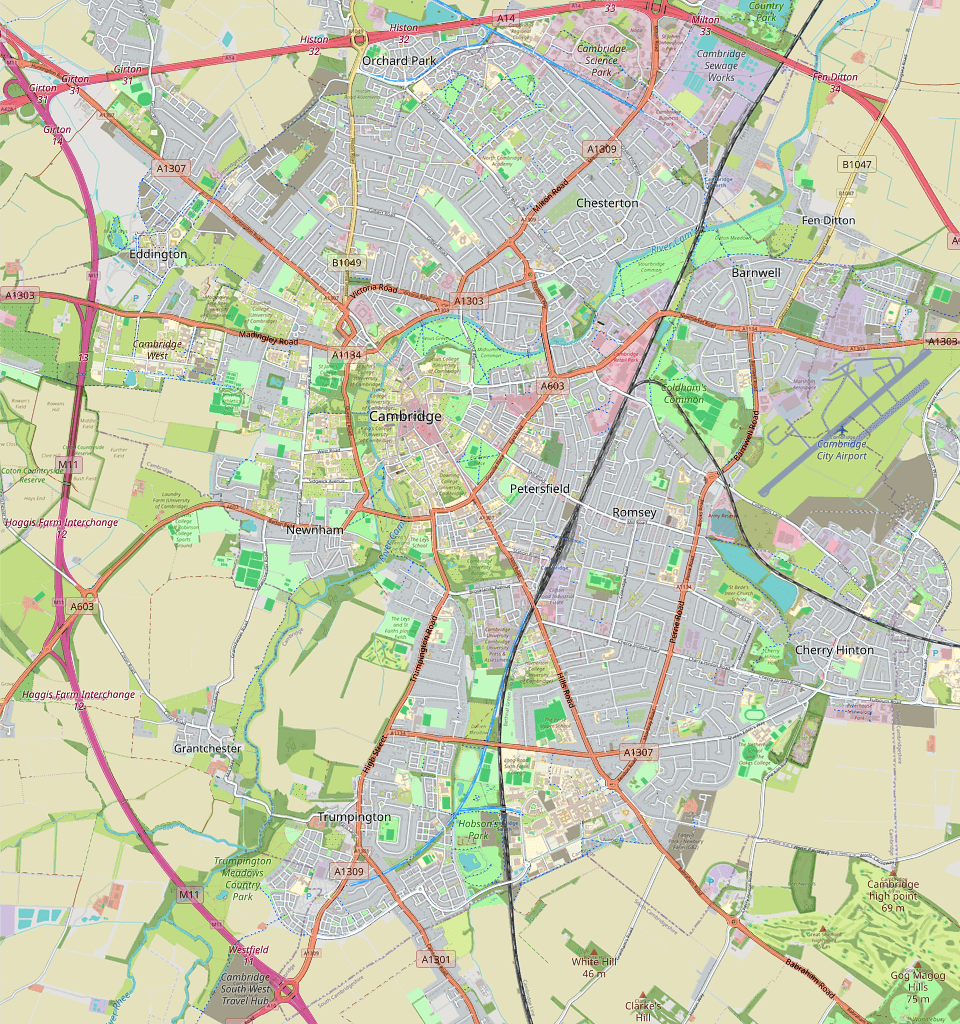
Cambridge railway stations map
(current in bold, closed in italics)

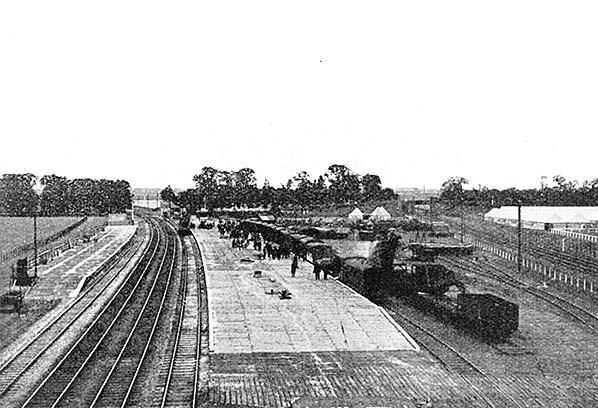
Trumpington railway station, close to the site of Cambridge South

A temporary station, known as Trumpington, was once located approximately 570 m (1,870 ft) north of the current Cambridge South station site. It was specifically constructed for the Royal Agricultural Society's show for four days between 4 July and 8 July 1922. After the event concluded, the station was then permanently demolished. Nothing of the original station survives or is visible today.

=== Proposal ===
Another new station to the south of Cambridge station was proposed by the Cambridgeshire County Council in January 2017 (shortly before the opening of Cambridge North station in May 2017), although the Cambridge Liberal Democrats had campaigned for it in the 1990s, then known as "Addenbrooke's Station". In August 2017, Transport Secretary Chris Grayling backed plans for a new station as part of the proposed East West Rail project, with a possible opening date of 2021, that could also include a light rail link. An unsuccessful application was made to the New Stations Fund 2 in August 2017, but £5 million was allocated to the project in the November 2017 United Kingdom budget.

The public consultation opened in January 2020 and lasted for eight weeks. At the time, Network Rail estimated the station to open between 2025 and 2027. Funding for the station was announced in the budget of March 2020. Three options for its location near Addenbrooke's Hospital were identified between the Cambridgeshire Guided Busway bridge on Cambridge Biomedical Campus to the north and the Addenbrooke's Road bridge to the south. In June 2020, Network Rail stated that out of three options, its preferred location for the station was at a site adjacent to the Biomedical Campus and the Guided Busway crossing. A second consultation was launched in October 2020, and lasted for approximately six to eight weeks. Network Rail submitted a Transport and Works Act Order application in June 2021 for a station on this site. In September 2022, Chancellor Kwasi Kwarteng announced Cambridge South as one of the 138 major infrastructure projects that the government aimed to fast-track.

== Construction and facilities ==
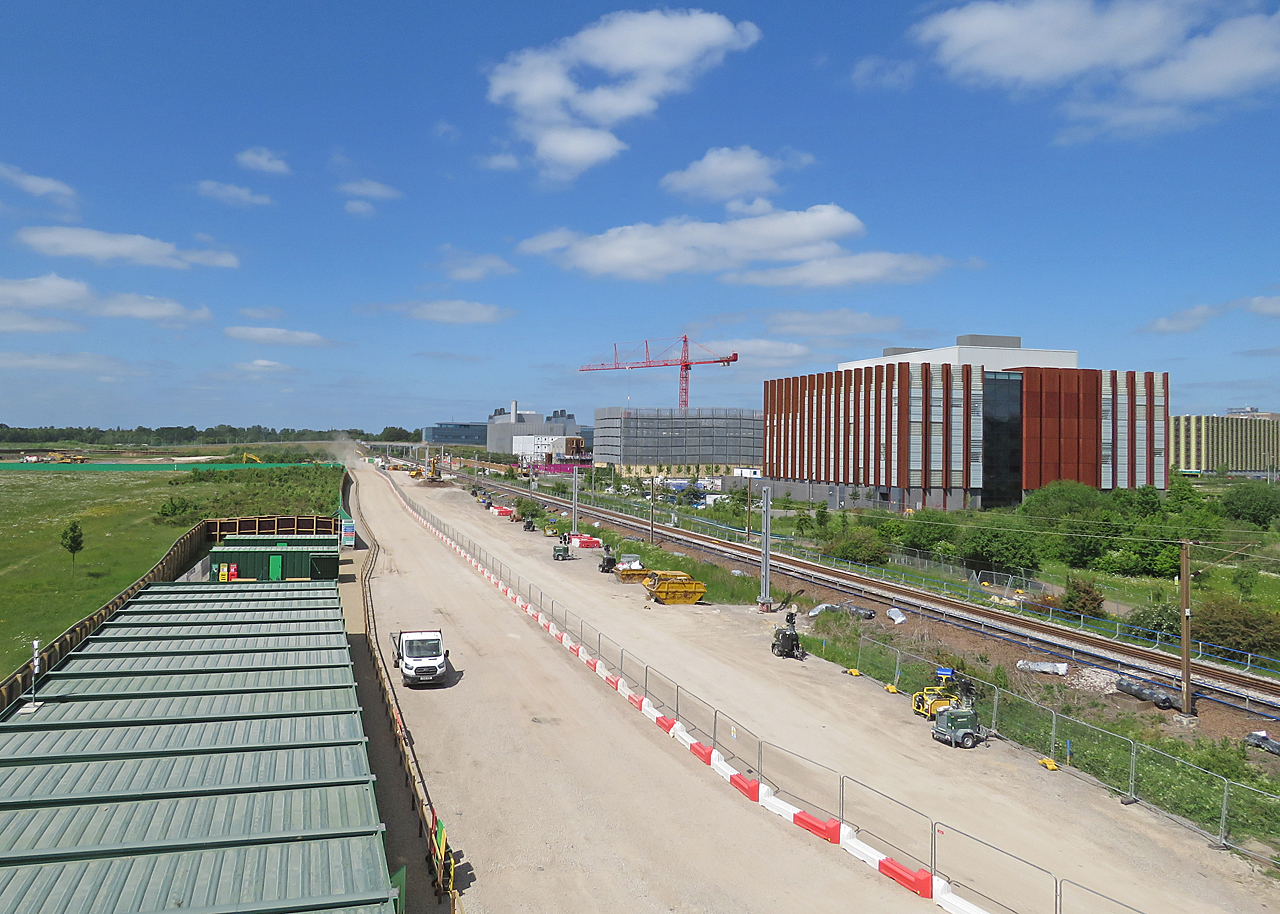
Early preparation works for Cambridge South station, taken in June 2023

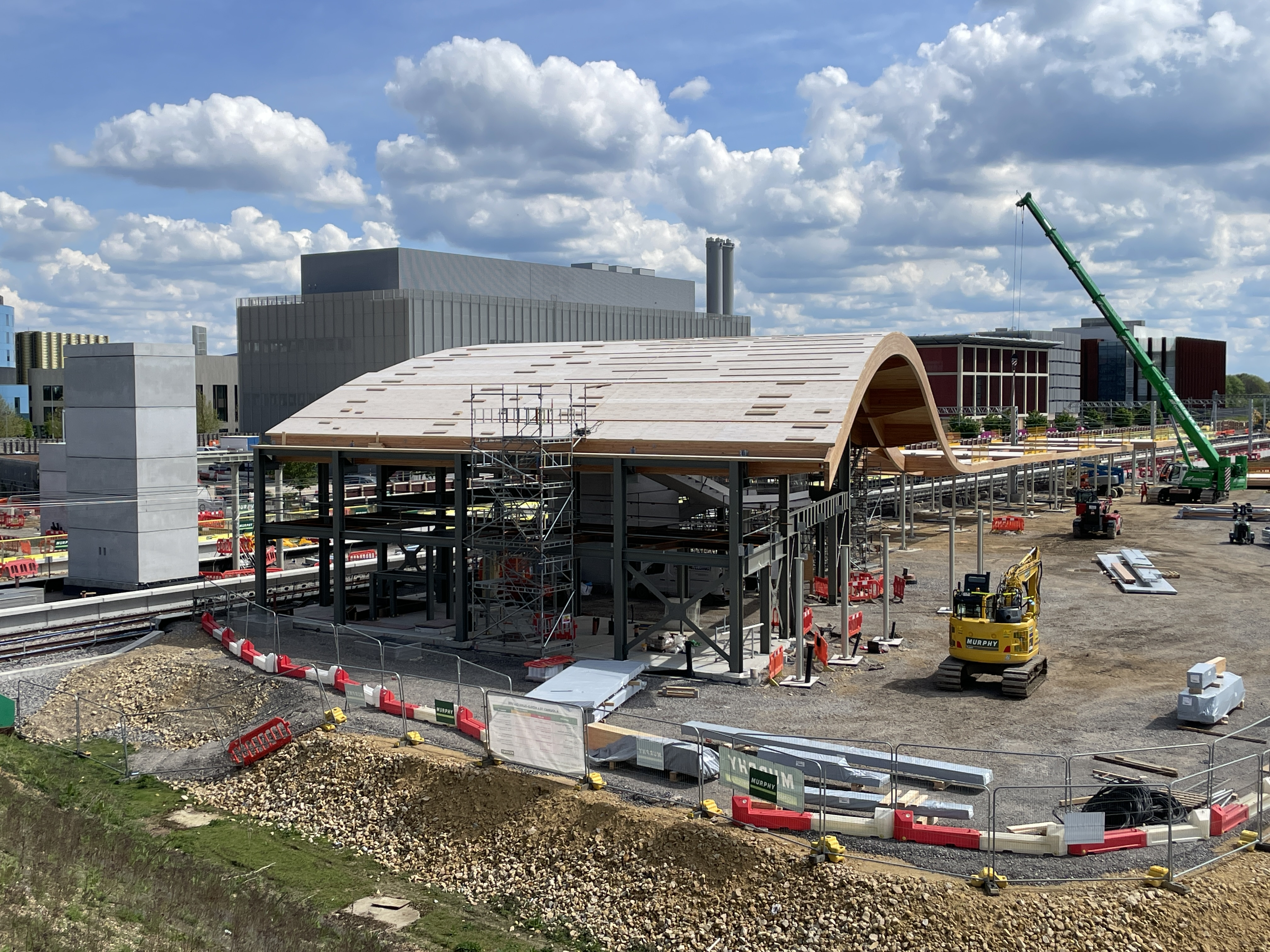
Construction works for the station, showing the station building under construction, taken in May 2024

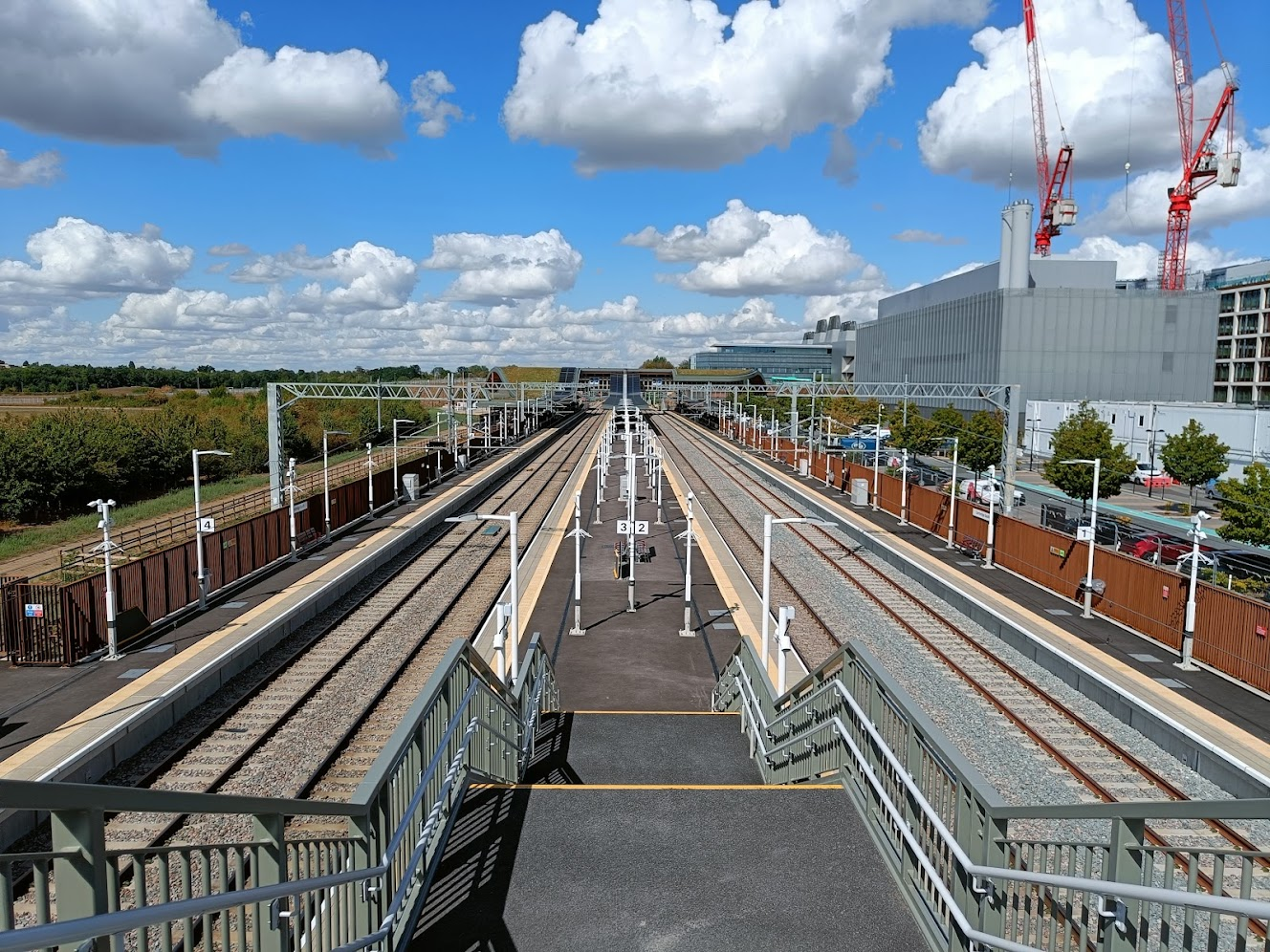
Cambridge South railway station in August 2026, viewed from the footbridge at the southern end of the station.

In December 2022, the station was given a Transport and Works Act Order approval, which authorised construction of the station and track laying. The station is built to be fully accessible by people with disabilities and has 1,000 cycle spaces. Construction work on the station then started in January 2023. The funding for the £250 million project was fully agreed by the government in June the same year. In addition, AstraZeneca, Cambridgeshire and Peterborough Combined Authority, and the Greater Cambridge Partnership have contributed £5 million to the project. In October 2023, Network Rail awarded a £93.4 million contract for the construction of the station to J Murphy & Sons Ltd. It has four platforms and is expected to be used by 1.8 million passengers per year.

The station was originally scheduled to open in December 2025, but this was delayed to early and then June 2026 in February and November 2025, first due to an upgrade to signalling across Cambridge and due to timetable changes on the East Coast Main Line, and then due to one of the subcontractors involved in the internal fit-out of electrical and mechanical systems of the station going into administration. Network Rail estimated that the station would cost £173 million in January 2023 and £228 million in November 2025. The Department for Transport announced the station's opening date of 28 June 2026 the previous month. It is the first station in the United Kingdom to carry the Great British Railways (GBR) branding in advance of the full renationalisation of passenger services in England under GBR.

As part of the Cambridge South station works, South Rail Systems Alliance (SRSA) made several improvements on the West Anglia Main Line (WAML) between Cambridge station and Shepreth. This includes the remodelling of Shepreth Branch Junction (where the WAML and Cambridge lines diverge) in order to allow trains to navigate the junction faster, and almost 10 km (6.2 miles) of new overhead line equipment. These improvements were finished in May 2025 and followed by a renewal of the signalling system during the 2025 Christmas holiday season.

Network Rail projected that 95% of passengers using the station will travel onwards by public transport, walking, or cycling. The station does not have a public car park, with its 15 spaces reserved for blue badge holders (given to people with certain disabilities), staff, taxis, and pick-up/drop-off. The station features artwork Together We from Turner Prize nominee Mark Titchner, installed on the balustrades of the stairs. It also features solar panels on the station roof in an effort to reduce 22 per cent of the station's carbon footprint. As the station is located next to a nature reserve at Hobson's Park, its design was taken into account in order to blend in with the surroundings. This included a green roof and a rainwater catchment system that stores and releases rainwater carefully back into the environment.

== Services ==
Cambridge South is served currently by four train operating companies.

The typical off-peak service pattern in trains per hour (tph) is:

- Greater Anglia:
  - 2 tph to London Liverpool Street;
  - 1 tph to Norwich, via the Breckland Line;
  - 1 tph to Stansted Airport;
  - 2 tph to Cambridge North – some services extend to Ely during peak times.
- CrossCountry:
  - 1 tph to Birmingham New Street, via Leicester;
  - 1 tph to Stansted Airport (some off-peak services terminate at Cambridge instead)
- Great Northern:
  - 2 tph which run non-stop to London Kings Cross
  - 1 tph that calls at all stations on the Cambridge line, before running semi-fast to Kings Cross
  - 2 tph to Ely, one of which (and both during peak times) extend to Kings Lynn
  - 1 tph to Cambridge
- Thameslink:
  - 2 tph to Brighton via London St Pancras.
  - 2 tph to Cambridge.

Preceding station	National Rail	Following station
Stansted Airport	CrossCountry; Birmingham–Stansted Airport	Cambridge
Foxton or London King's Cross	Great Northern; Cambridge line	Cambridge
Shelford or Whittlesford Parkway	Greater Anglia; West Anglia Main Line	Cambridge
Royston	Thameslink; Thameslink	Cambridge
	Future services	
Cambourne	East West Rail; Oxford to Cambridge	Cambridge

== See also ==
- Cambridge East railway station – Proposed station in Cambridge, England to serve a new suburb to occupy the Cambridge Airport site.
