= Cambourne Church =

Coordinates: 52.2189°N 0.0630°W

- Cambourne Church
- Country: England
- Denomination: LEP: CofE, Baptist, Methodist, URC
- Churchmanship: Varied
- Website: www.cambournechurch.org.uk

History
- Status: Parish church

Architecture
- Functional status: Active
- Years built: 2010
- Construction cost: 1.1 million

Administration
- Diocese: Ely
- Archdeaconry: Cambridge
- Deanery: Bourne
- Parish: Cambourne

Cambourne Church is a "local ecumenical partnership" between the Church of England, Baptist Union of Great Britain, Methodist Church of Great Britain and the United Reformed Church. It is located in the heart of Cambourne, Cambridgeshire and provides Christian community in the area. The church is theologically diverse and maintains a lively range of traditions within its services. It is the Church of England parish church for Cambourne. The local Roman Catholic community called Saint John Fisher Church also worships within the church centre.

== History ==
Cambourne is a new town nine miles west of Cambridge, designed as a series of three interlinked villages. Cambourne Church started meeting shortly after the first residents arrived in 1999, the first minister, Rev Peter Wood, was appointed in 2001. The church has grown steadily with the community, playing an instrumental role from its very beginning. It is a lively ecumenical partnership sponsored by the Church of England, the Baptist Union, the Methodist Church and the United Reformed Church, and in association with the Roman Catholic Church. The church building is on the corner of Jeavons Lane.

== The present ==
The Revd Bill Miller (Baptist minister) is the present incumbent and has been in post since 2019.

At present the church offers two services on a Sunday morning at 9:30 am (more traditional) and 11 am (contemporary). Groups for children and young people meet during the 11 am service.

The church currently operates a community café (19 ~ The Coffee House).

== Governance ==
The church land and buildings are owned by Shared Churches Ely, which is formed by representatives of the partner denominations. There is also a "Local Advisory Group", also made up of members of the partner denominations, which advises the Minister with regards to the direction of ministry at the Church.

At a more direct level, the Church membership elect a Church Council to oversee the mission and ministry of the church. There is also a Ministry Team (made up of the Minister, Assistant Minister, wardens, administrator and other paid staff) which manages day-to-day ministry.
