= Cambridge North railway station =

Railway station in Chesterton, Cambridgeshire

Cambridge North
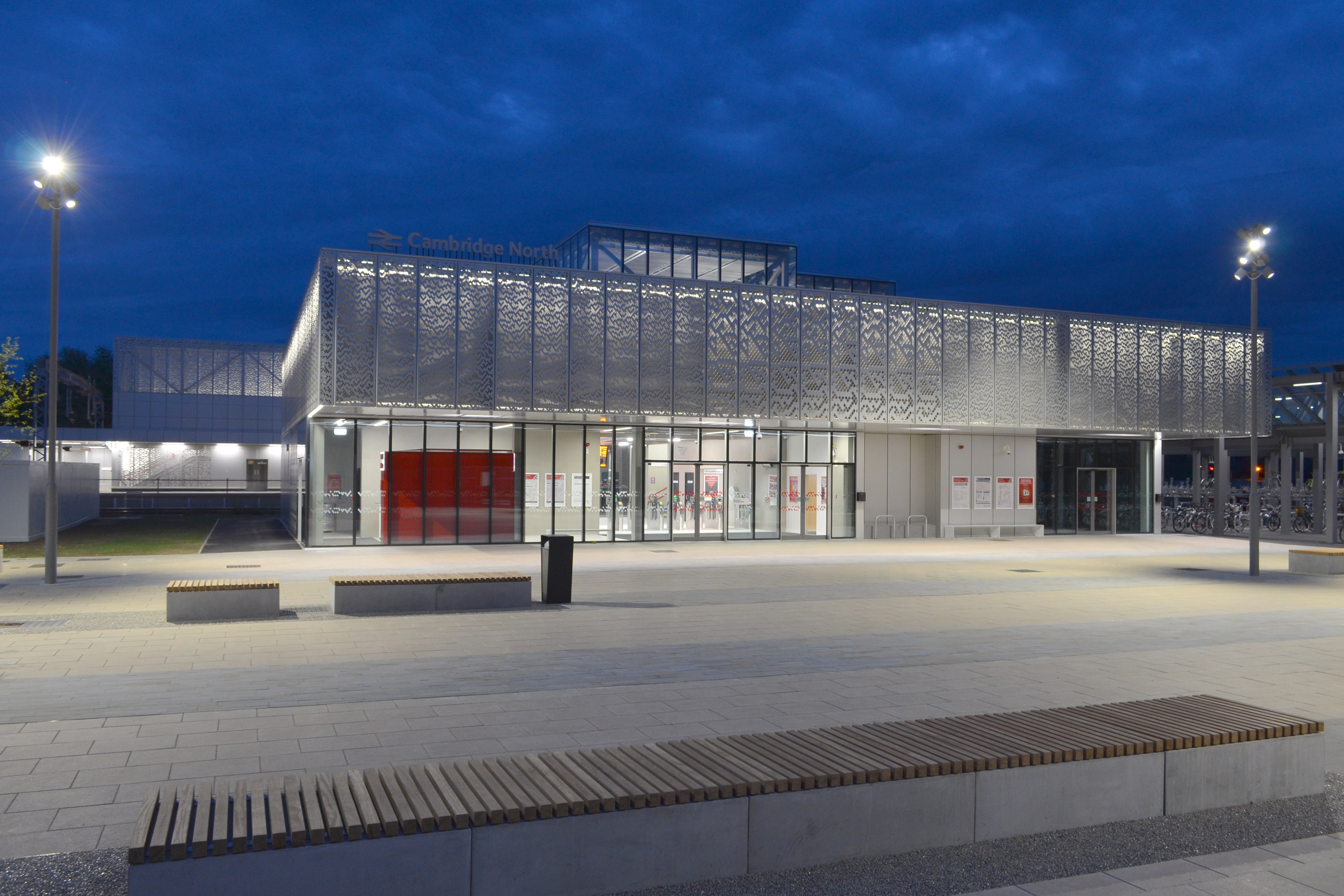
- Night view of Cambridge North railway station

General information
- Location: Chesterton, Cambridge; South Cambridgeshire District; England
- Coordinates: 52°13′24″N 0°9′28″E
- Manager: Greater Anglia
- Platforms: 3
- Connections: Cambridgeshire Guided Busway

Construction
- Architect: Atkins

Other information
- Station code: CMB

Key dates
- 21 May 2017: Opened

Passengers
- 2020–21: ▼0.221 million
- Interchange: ▼539
- 2021–22: ▲0.734 million
- Interchange: ▲1,437
- 2022–23: ▲1.075 million
- Interchange: ▼936
- 2023–24: ▲1.269 million
- Interchange: ▲1,631
- 2024–25: ▲1.460 million
- Interchange: ▲2,070
Location
Notes
- Passenger statistics from the Office of Rail and Road

Cambridge North railway station is a railway station serving northern Cambridge, in Cambridgeshire, England. The station is on the Fen Line, which runs from Cambridge to King's Lynn. It connects to the Cambridgeshire Guided Busway, and provides an interchange with Park & Ride and local bus services.

The station is located in the urban area of Cambridge, adjacent to the suburb of Chesterton and close to Cambridge Science Park, within the local government district of South Cambridgeshire. It was approved in December 2013; construction commenced in July 2014; and it opened on 21 May 2017.

It has three platforms: platform 1 on the eastern side of the station serves southbound fast services to Cambridge, Stansted Airport, and London King's Cross as well as some morning peak-time services to London Liverpool Street; platform 2 serves northbound services to Ely, King's Lynn and Norwich; platform 3 is a south-facing bay serving semi-fast and slow services to London Liverpool Street via Cambridge and Bishop's Stortford.

A few services King's Lynn to or from London King's Cross pass through without stopping. All Cross Country services to or from Birmingham New Street and Stansted Airport also pass through without stopping. The line speed through Cambridge North is 75 mph (121 km/h).

== History ==
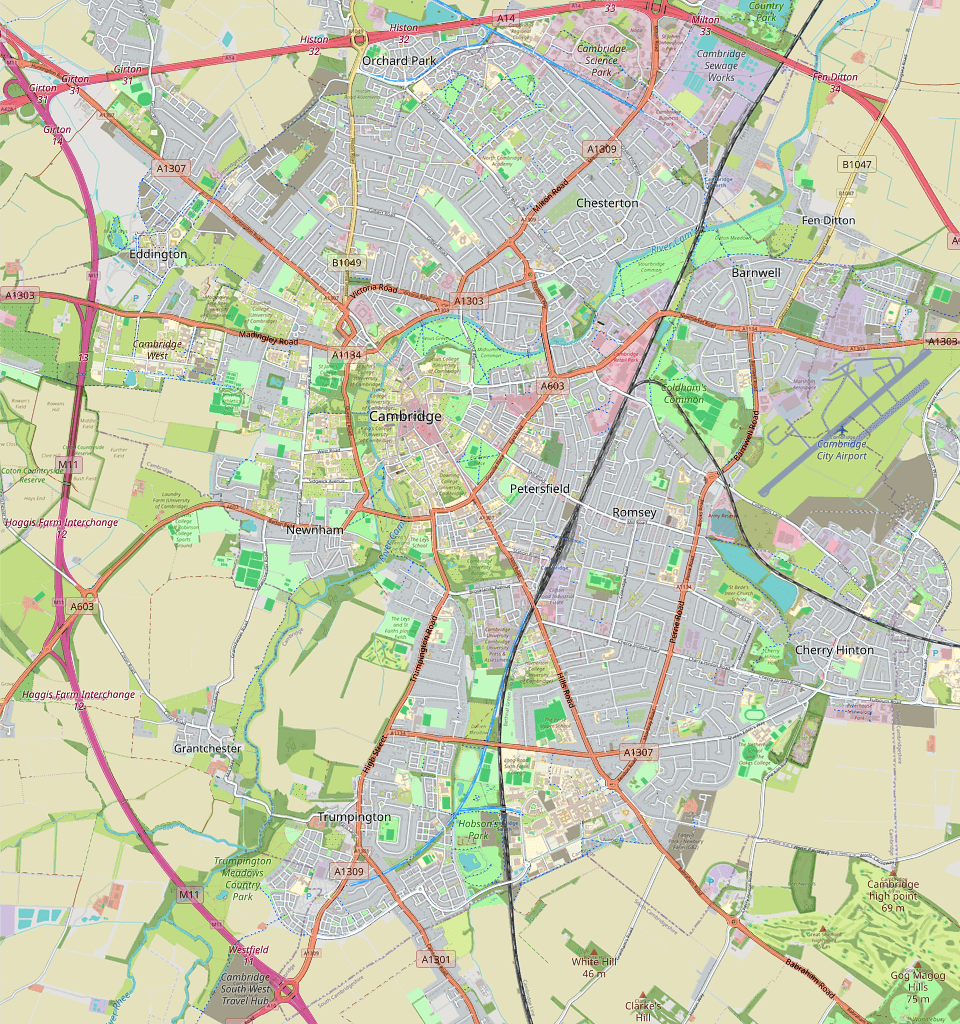
Cambridge railway stations map
(current in bold, closed in italics)

=== Predecessor ===
Chesterton railway station was a brief predecessor to Cambridge North, opening on 19 January 1850 and closing just ten months later in October 1850. Located 200 metres south of the current station, it served as a junction on the Eastern Counties Railway, but was ultimately unsuccessful due to its remote location at the time. The site later became part of Chesterton Sidings.

=== Proposals ===
The first proposal for a station serving the north of Cambridge was made in 2003 in the Cambridgeshire and Peterborough Structure Plan, which saw the facility as a means of supporting growth in the Cambridge Sub-Region and of delivering an integrated transport network. A major scheme business case and GRIP 2 study were presented to the Department for Transport in 2007. The business case identified a site on the West Anglia Main Line, approximately 3 miles (4.8 km) to the north of Cambridge station, which is owned by Network Rail and partly leased to English, Welsh and Scottish Railway as stabling sidings. The station would be located on or very near the site of Chesterton railway station which closed in 1850.

The station would provide an interchange facility with the local transport network, including the Cambridgeshire Guided Busway and would offer a public transport alternative for trips to the Cambridge Science Park and new development in the Cambridge Northern Fringe. The business case put forward four options for the facility of which its preferred one was a three-platform station comprising a bay platform on the alignment of the former St Ives line and an island platform on the main line. This option was costed at £15 million and showed a benefit-cost ratio of 3.09.

Progress was slow due to a number of issues including the need to retain Chesterton Junction yard as an aggregate handling sidings and difficulties in relocating rail freight operations elsewhere, as well as funding difficulties resulting from the loss of the Transport Innovation Fund (TIF) support mechanism and regional planning and associated instruments such as the East of England Regional Funding Assessment. Following the demise of the TIF, which led to plans for a congestion charge in Cambridge to be put on hold, Conservative party literature indicated that the station would not go ahead, which prompted local transport group CAST.IRON to propose a cheaper single-platform station in Milton Road as an interim solution. By this time, the cost of a new station had risen to £24 million, of which £21 million had been expected to be provided through government funding, and Cambridgeshire County Council began seeking alternative options. The Council eventually settled on an approach whereby it would provide the initial capital funding and recoup the cost over a period of time from access charges paid by train operating companies.

In February 2011, Cambridge MP Julian Huppert gave his support to the project along with the leader of Cambridge City Council, Sian Reid. In September 2011, Theresa Villiers, the Minister of State for Transport, visited Cambridge, and discussed the proposed station with county council members, saying that the government was interested in further development of the council's proposal.

=== Approval ===
In February 2012, Theresa Villiers sent a letter of support to Cambridgeshire County Council indicating that so long as the station's business case remained positive, it would be included in the timetable for the reletting of the East Anglia franchise covering the Fen Line. A revised business case produced in 2012 found a benefit-cost ratio of 4.5:1. The Council released details of a proposed service pattern comprising four off-peak Up and Down trains per hour and indicated that the planning process would begin in 2013.

On 18 December 2013, Cambridge City Council approved plans for the new station. Works began in July 2014 to extend the Cambridgeshire Guided Busway to the station site. Completion of the station works was scheduled for December 2015, but this was delayed until May 2017 due to Network Rail's desire to minimise disruption to existing services and its resubmission of plans for the station's construction.

On 19 August 2015, Cambridge City Council approved Network Rail's new plans for the station, which were not substantially different from the original plans put forward by Cambridgeshire County Council in 2013. Following Network Rail's intervention, the cost of the station was revised upwards to £44 million.

=== Naming ===
The proposed station was initially referred to as "Chesterton" or "Chesterton Interchange". Numerous suggestions were put forward for the official name, including "Stephen Hawking Cambridge Science Park" which was supported by Julian Huppert and Daniel Zeichner. In December 2014, Cambridge City Council and South Cambridgeshire District Council launched a consultation to select the name from a choice of four: Cambridge Science Park, Cambridge North, Chesterton Interchange or Cambridge Fen.

On 11 March 2015, councillors at Cambridgeshire County Council voted to recommend to Network Rail that the station should be called Cambridge North. According to Graham Hughes, the council's director of economy, transport and environment, stated that the name would provide a good indication of the station's geographical location, adding that calling it "Cambridge Science Park" could be misleading as that was situated 3/4 mile (1.2 km) away and, in any event, Trinity College, which owns the Science Park, had not come out in support. By contrast, St John's Innovation Centre was closer and landowners, including the Crown Estate, had been lobbying to have the station named "The Business Park".

=== Opening ===
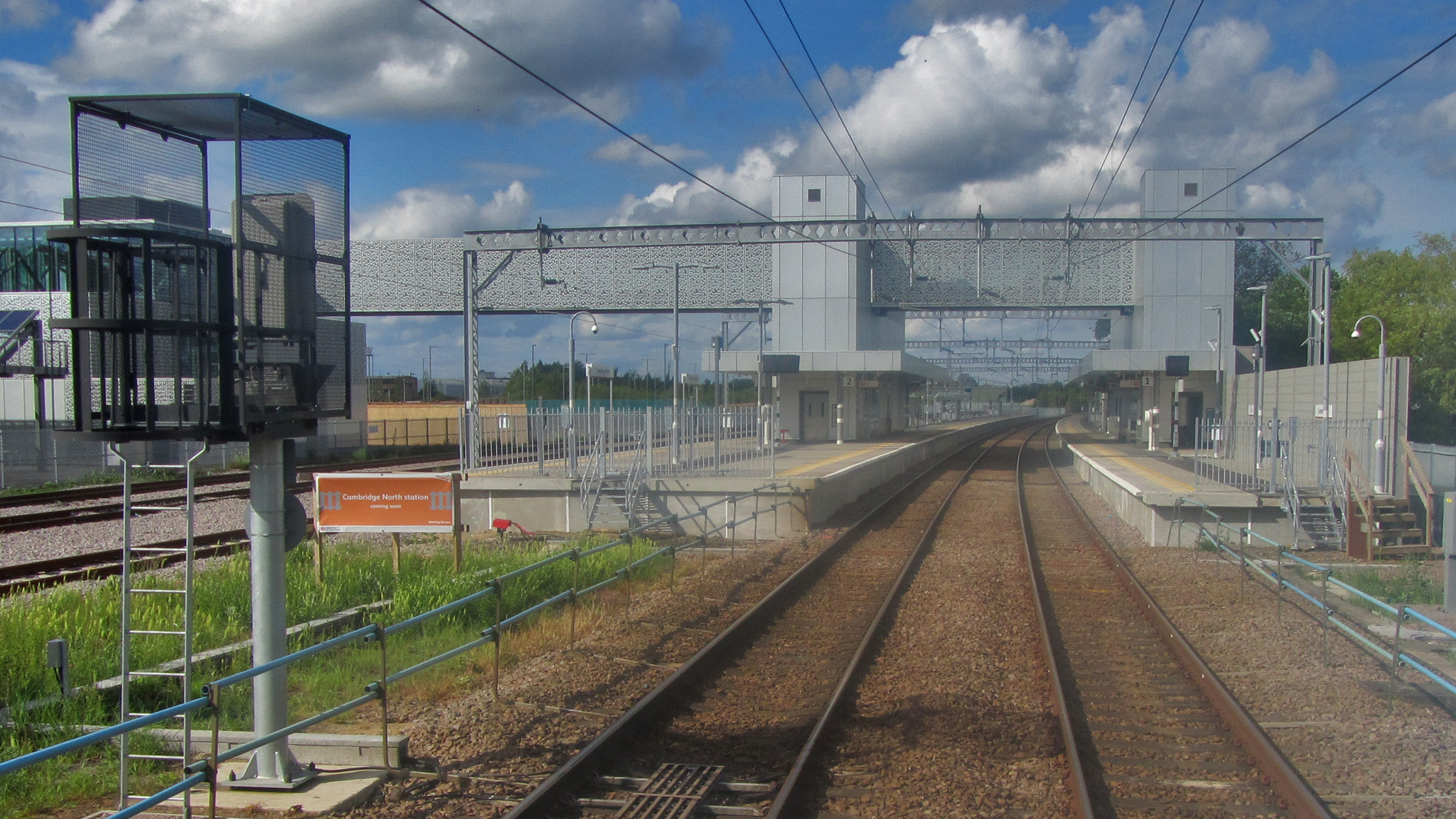
The station just before opening in 2017

Originally planned to open in December 2015, it was later intended that the interior fit-out of the station take place between October 2016 and February 2017. On New Year's Eve 2016, new signalling and a crossover for the bay platform were installed. The infrastructure was authorised for passenger use by April 2017, and the station's opening and first timetabled passenger services went ahead on 21 May 2017. Approximately 320,000 passengers used the station in its first 12 months of operation.

== Facilities ==
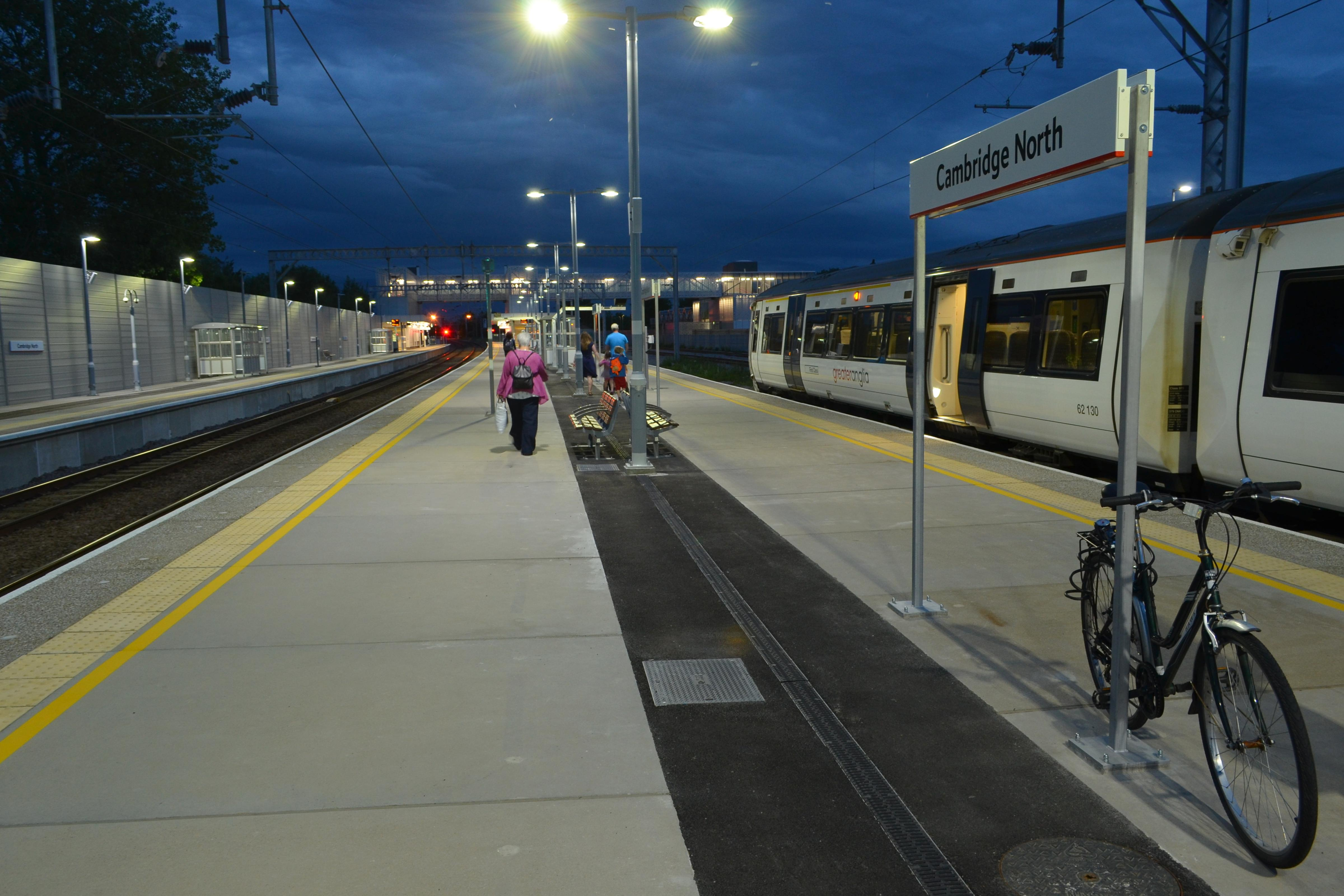
Cambridge North railway station platforms

The original design for the station was submitted by Atkins; this was revised by Network Rail when it became the principal contractor. Network Rail updated the car park's design to maximise its potential as a park and ride facility.

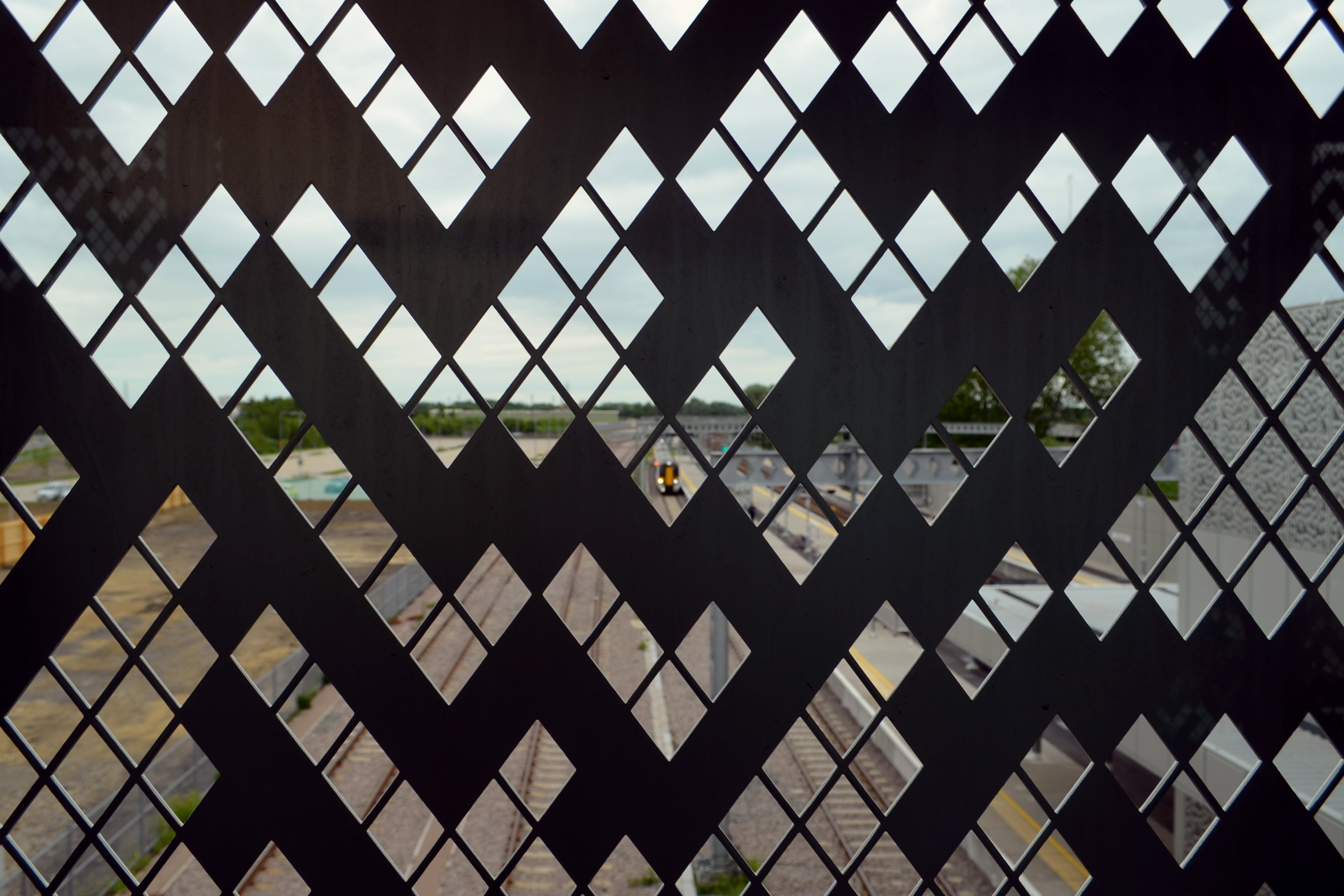
Detail of cladding viewed from overbridge

The facilities comprise a 450-square-metre (4,800 sq ft) station building comprising a passenger waiting area, toilets, ticket office, retail and amenity space, and staff accommodation. An overbridge links the building with two 254-metre (833 ft) platforms capable of accommodating 12-car trains. The easternmost platform faces the up line of the Fen Line, while the second platform is an island platform with the down Fen Line on one side and a south-facing bay platform on the other. Two relaid freight lines for Lafarge run next to the bay platform.

Interchange facilities are provided in the form of a 450-space car park, a cycle space for 1,000 bikes, new pedestrian and vehicular access from Cowley Road and a 1 kilometre (0.62 mi) extension of the Cambridgeshire Guided Busway from Milton Road. The Cambridge Cycling Campaign published their proposals for integration of the new station with cycling and pedestrian facilities in November 2012. The cycle park canopy is fitted with solar panels generating 49 kWp or roughly 10% of the station's power needs.

The cladding of the building features a pierced design derived from Rule 30, a cellular automaton introduced by Stephen Wolfram in 1983.

== Abbey-Chesterton Bridge ==
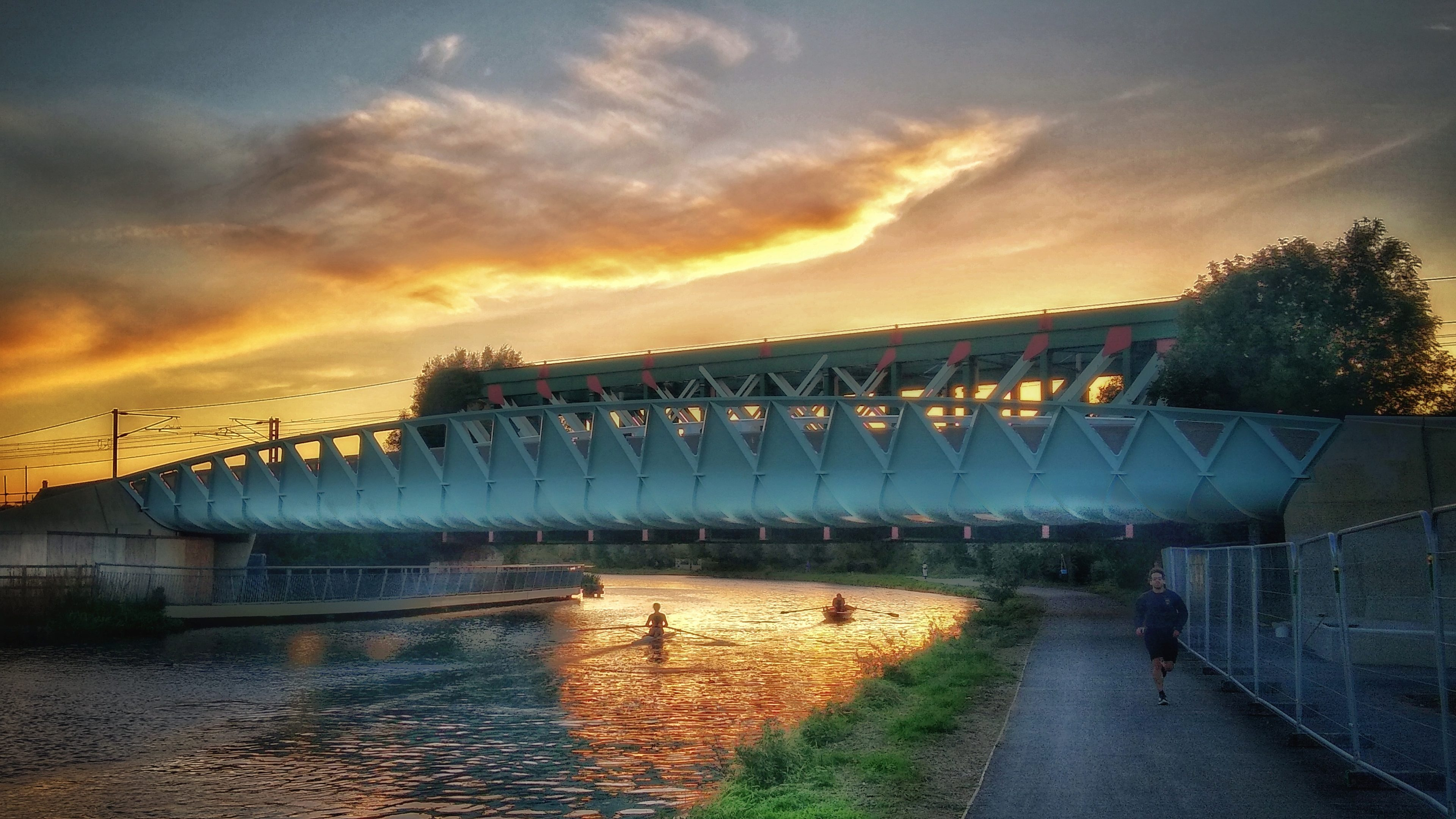
The cycle and pedestrian Abbey-Chesterton Bridge, with the railway bridge behind

On 23 December 2021, the Abbey-Chesterton Bridge over the River Cam opened, providing cycle and pedestrian access to the station from the Abbey district of Cambridge and from Fen Ditton. The bridge is part of the Chisholm Trail, a footpath and cycle route linking Cambridge Science Park with Addenbrookes Hospital and Cambridge Biomedical Campus in the south of the city. The bridge provides pedestrian access to the Abbey Stadium, Cambridge United Football Club's home ground, approximately 1.5 km (1 mile) away.

== Services ==
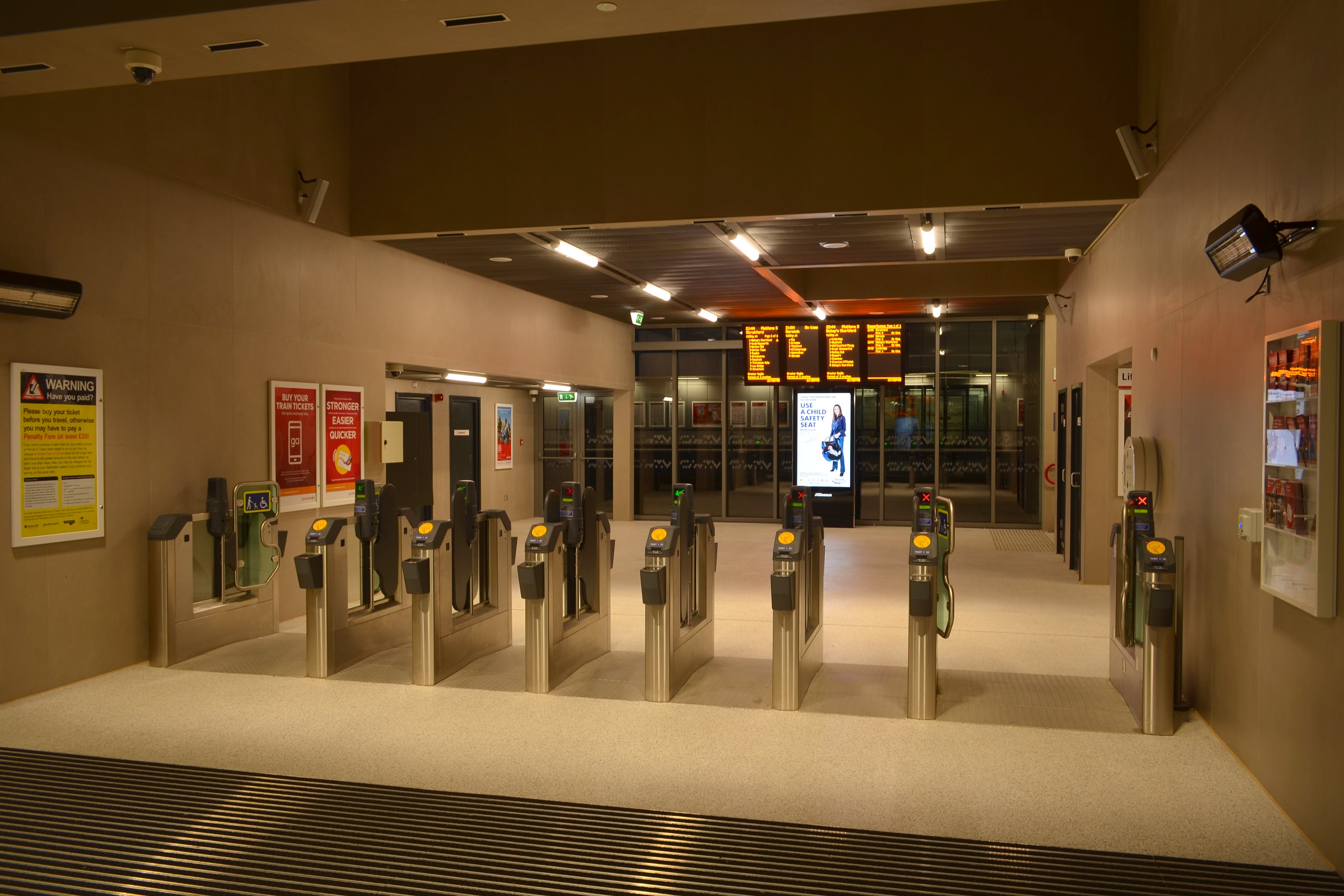
Cambridge North railway station ticket barriers with lists of connections on the screens behind

Services at Cambridge North are operated by Great Northern and Greater Anglia.

The typical off-peak service in trains per hour (tph) is:

- 2 tph to London King's Cross (non-stop from Cambridge)
- 2 tph to London Liverpool Street (1 semi-fast, 1 stopping)
- 3 tph to Ely of which 1 continues to King's Lynn, and 1 continues to Norwich
- 1 tph to Stansted Airport

During the peak hours, the services to London King's Cross call additionally at Royston and Letchworth Garden City, and the northbound services to Ely are extended to King's Lynn. Some Greater Anglia services also continue northwards to Ely.

Preceding station	National Rail	Following station
Cambridge	Great Northern Fen Line	Waterbeach
Cambridge	Greater Anglia Fen Line Peak Hours Only	Waterbeach
Cambridge	Greater Anglia West Anglia Main Line	Terminus
Cambridge	Greater Anglia Breckland Line	Ely
Cambridge	Greater Anglia Breckland Line	Waterbeach Peak Hours Only

== See also ==
- Cambridge South railway station, a new station in the south of Cambridge, opened June 2026.

== Sources ==
- Adderson, Richard; Kenworthy, Graham (October 2005). Cambridge to Ely including St Ives to Ely. Eastern Main Lines. Midhurst: Middleton Press. ISBN 978-1-904474-55-5.
