= Cambridge railway station =

Railway station in Cambridgeshire, England

Cambridge
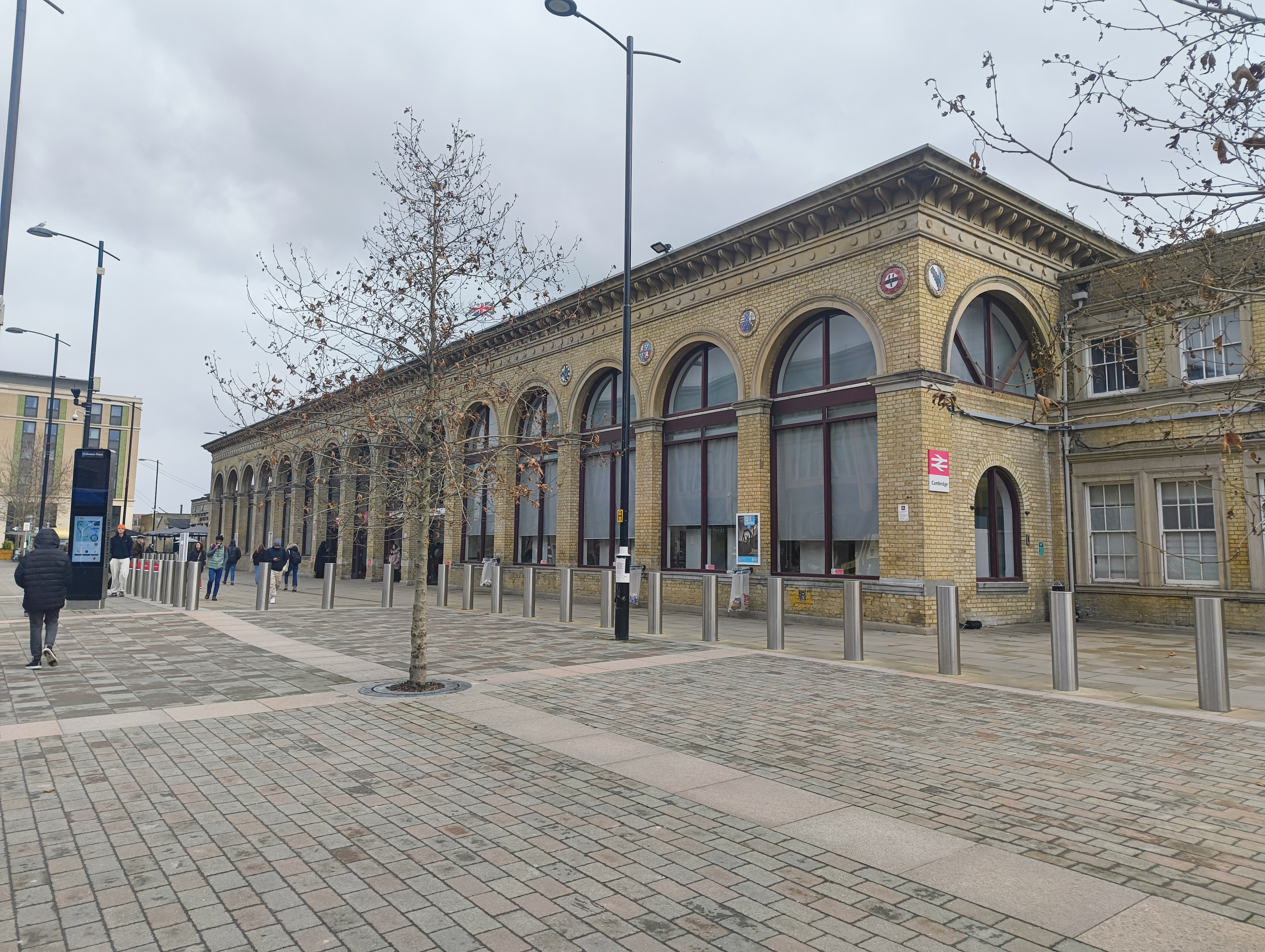
- The station building, February 2025

General information
- Location: Cambridge, Cambridgeshire, England
- Coordinates: 52°11′39″N 0°08′15″E
- Grid reference: TL462572
- Manager: Greater Anglia
- Platforms: 8

Construction
- Architect: Sancton Wood, Francis Thompson

Other information
- Station code: CBG
- Classification: DfT category B station

History
- Opened: 29 July 1845

Passengers
- 2020–21: ▼2.301 million
- Interchange: ▼0.123 million
- 2021–22: ▲6.953 million
- Interchange: ▲0.389 million
- 2022–23: ▲9.342 million
- Interchange: ▲0.481 million
- 2023–24: ▲10.033 million
- Interchange: ▲0.712 million
- 2024–25: ▲10.598 million
- Interchange: ▼0.579 million
Location
Notes
- Passenger statistics from the Office of Rail and Road

Cambridge railway station serves central Cambridge, in Cambridgeshire, England. Situated at the end of Station Road, it lies 1 mile (1.6 km) south-east of the city centre. With over ten million passengers passing through the station in 2023–24, it is both the busiest station in the East of England region and the thirteenth busiest outside of London.

The station serves as the northern terminus for both the West Anglia Main Line from London Liverpool Street, and of the Cambridge line from London Kings Cross. The station is also the southern terminus of three secondary routes: the Fen line to King's Lynn, the Breckland line to Norwich, and the Ipswich–Ely line to Ipswich.

The station is managed and served by Greater Anglia, with services also operated by Great Northern, Thameslink and CrossCountry. It is one of three railway stations in Cambridge; the others are Cambridge North, approximately 2.5 miles (4 km) away, and Cambridge South 1.4 miles (2 km).

== History ==
=== Up to 1923 ===
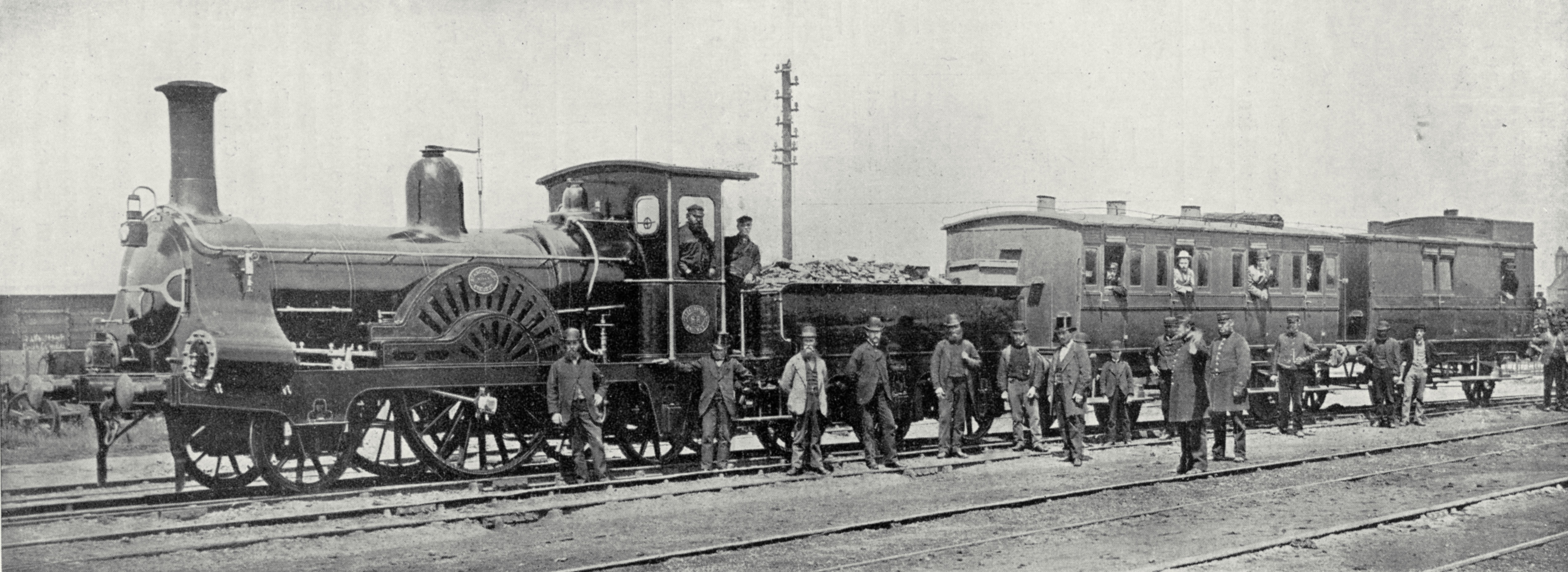
Staff of Cambridge station posing with train, 1870

Although the first main line inter-city railway was the Liverpool and Manchester Railway, which opened in 1830, surveys for a railway through Cambridge had been conducted as early as 1822. After many failed attempts for a railway, the Eastern Counties Railway (Ely, Brandon and Peterborough Extension) Act 1844 (7 & 8 Vict. c. lxii) was passed in 1844, which allowed the Eastern Counties Railway (ECR) to extend their line as far as Ely via Cambridge from its terminus at Bishop's Stortford, which had been reached in May 1842.

The 1844 Act also included an extension of the line north of Cambridge to Brandon, which ended the concept of a connection through to Norwich. Robert Stephenson was appointed engineer and, on 29 July 1845, the station opened with services operating from Bishopsgate station in London, via Stratford and Bishop's Stortford.

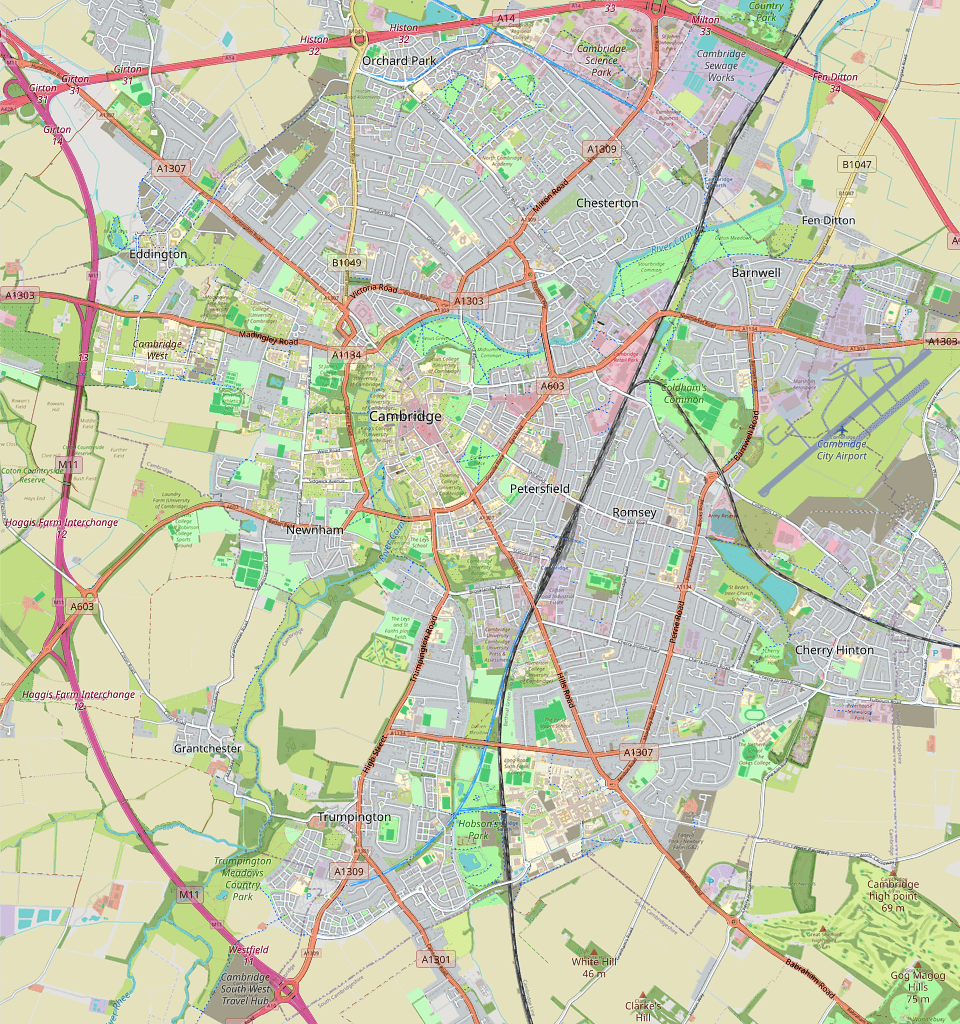
Cambridge railway stations map
(current in bold, closed in italics)

In the years following the opening of the main line from Cambridge through to Norwich in 1845, other railways were built to the city. Initially, some of these planned to have separate stations but opposition from the university saw them all eventually using the same station. The first line to arrive was the St Ives to Huntingdon line, which opened in 1847 and was built by the East Anglian Railway. Services to Peterborough also commenced that year, with the opening of the line from Ely via March to Peterborough, which also became the main route for coal traffic into East Anglia which was built by the ECR.

The following year, the ECR opened a line between St Ives and March, which saw some passenger services, although the coal traffic was then diverted on to this route.

In 1851, a branch line from Newmarket to Cambridge (Coldham Lane Junction) was opened which partly used the alignment of the Newmarket and Chesterford Railway which subsequently closed. In 1854, the Newmarket line was extended eastwards to meet the Eastern Union Railway line at Bury St Edmunds, allowing through running to Ipswich.

An act of Parliament, the Royston and Hitchin Railway Amendment (Shepreth Extension) Act 1848 (11 & 12 Vict. c. cxix) was granted to the Royston and Hitchin Railway to extend its line from Royston. Although Cambridge was its goal, Parliament sanctioned only an extension as far as Shepreth, as the ECR had opposed the extension to Cambridge. The line was completed in 1851 and initially the Great Northern Railway (GNR), which had leased the Royston and Hitchin Railway in the interim, ran a connecting horse-drawn omnibus service. This proved unsuccessful so, in April 1852, the line was extended to join the ECR main line south of Cambridge and was leased to the ECR for 14 years, with a connection to enable it to run trains from Cambridge to Hitchin.

In 1862, the Bedford and Cambridge Railway opened. Originally a local undertaking, it was soon acquired by the London & North Western Railway (LNWR), extended to Bletchley, and saw services between Oxford and Cambridge introduced on what became known as the Varsity Line.

By the 1860s, the railways in East Anglia were in financial trouble and most were leased to the ECR; they wished to amalgamate formally, but could not obtain government agreement for this until 1862, when the Great Eastern Railway (GER) was formed by amalgamation. Thus Cambridge became a GER station in 1862.

The University of Cambridge helped block later 19th-century attempts to create a central station.

The GER opened the cross-country line from Marks Tey via Sudbury and Haverhill to Shelford in 1865, which enabled the introduction of direct services to Colchester.

The Midland Railway built a line from Kettering to Huntingdon which opened in 1866 and services ran to Cambridge using running powers over the Huntingdon to St Ives line. In 1866, the GNR reapplied to run services from King's Cross, as the lease on the line to Hitchin was ending. Initially the GER opposed this but eventually agreement was reached and, from 1 April 1866, services started operating between Cambridge and King's Cross from a dedicated platform at Cambridge station.

In 1882, the Great Northern and Great Eastern Joint Railway was opened. As well as becoming the major route for coal traffic from the North East to East Anglia, it saw the introduction of direct services between London, Cambridge and York. Goods trains generally passed Cambridge on dedicated goods lines to the east of the station. Between these and the station, a number of carriage sidings existed.

The next line to open was in 1884, when the Fordham line opened, joining the main line towards Ely at Barnwell Junction. The following year the branch to Mildenhall opened and services operated direct from there to Cambridge.

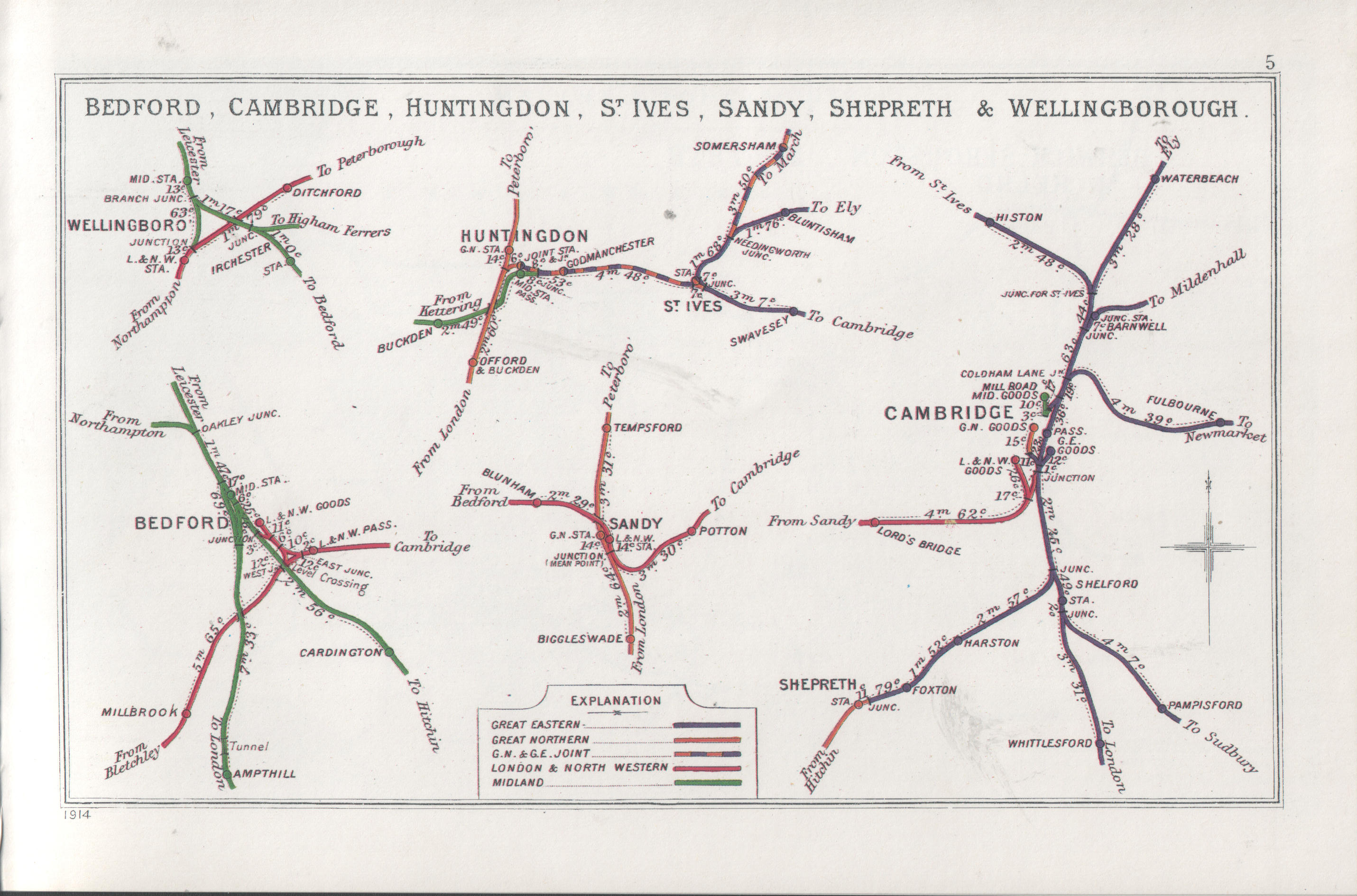
A 1914 Railway Clearing House map showing (right) railways in the vicinity of Cambridge

Each of the four companies also had its own goods facilities in the station area and, except for the MR, its own motive power depot. The GER maintained a special locomotive for the Royal Train here for workings between London and Sandringham.

==== Services ====
Great Eastern Railway:

- Main line from London Liverpool Street to Norwich and King's Lynn
- Cross-country services to Bury St Edmunds via Newmarket and to Colchester
- Cross-country services via Ely, March, and the Great Northern and Great Eastern Joint Line to northern England
- Branch line to St Ives and beyond
- Branch line to Mildenhall.

Great Northern Railway:

- Services to London King's Cross, via Hitchin, including the Cambridge Buffet Car Expresses.

London and North Western Railway:

- Cross-country Varsity Line to Oxford Rewley Road.

Midland Railway:

- Services to Kettering, via St Ives.

=== LNER (1923–1947) ===
In the 1923 Grouping, the GER amalgamated with other railways to form the London and North Eastern Railway (LNER) and Cambridge became a LNER station. The Midland and LNWR similarly amalgamated with other railways to form the London, Midland and Scottish Railway (LMS).

In around 1928, the LNER resignalled the station replacing its five signal boxes with two electrically controlled boxes, with the work carried out by the British Power Railway Signal Company.

=== British Railways (1948–1996) ===
Following nationalisation of the British railway network, Cambridge station was operated by the Eastern Region of British Railways.

East Anglia was one of the first areas in the country where British Railways wanted to phase out steam operation in favour of diesel traction. From 1959, diesels started to take over operation of services with Cambridge engine shed closing to steam in 1962. Diesel shunters and multiple units were allocated to another shed on the opposite side of the line, known as Coldham Lane.

The 1960s saw the closure of number of the lines serving Cambridge at this time. First to go was the lightly used line to Mildenhall, closed to passengers on 18 June 1962. The Stour Valley Railway route to Colchester, via Haverhill and Sudbury, closed on 6 March 1967 although the Sudbury-Marks Tey section remains operational as a branch line today. The Varsity Line to Oxford also saw passenger services to Bedford withdrawn during this year, on 30 December 1967, as did the line between March and St Ives.

Passenger services along the Cambridge & St. Ives Branch managed to survive the Beeching Axe but, with British Rail citing heavy losses, the final passenger service ran between St Ives and Cambridge on 5 October 1970. Despite campaigns to reopen the service during the 1970s, the only subsequent rail traffic on the line was a freight service to Chivers in Histon, which ran until 1983 and a contract to ferry sand from ARC at Fen Drayton which continued until May 1992.

The line from Bishop's Stortford to Cambridge was electrified by British Rail in 1987, enabling electric trains to operate between Liverpool Street and Cambridge. The station also underwent a £650,000 refurbishment in 1987, funded jointly by Network SouthEast, the Railway Heritage Trust and Cambridge City Council.

When the link to Stansted Airport from Liverpool Street opened in 1991, the Cambridge line became more important; all non-stop trains now take this route to London King's Cross, reducing congestion on the very busy stretch of the West Anglia Main Line between Liverpool Street and Bishop's Stortford.

=== Privatisation era (1994–present) ===
The station won the Large Station of the Year award at the National Rail Awards in 2017.

==== Operations ====
The Railways Act 1993 came into force on 1 April 1994; train operating units ran the services initially whilst the franchises were let.

A number of different train operating companies (TOCs) have operated services at Cambridge station since privatisation:

- West Anglia Great Northern which was initially owned by Prism Rail, but then bought by National Express, operated the West Anglia Great Northern franchise from January 1997 until March 2004. This covered services to both Liverpool Street and King's Cross stations, as well as King's Lynn. In April 2004, the Liverpool Street route became part of National Express East Anglia (NXEA) franchise whilst the Great Northern route to King's Cross remained part of WAGN until March 2006, when it became part of the First Capital Connect franchise.
- Services to Ipswich and Norwich were initially operated by Anglia Railways from January 1997; these routes later became part of the NXEA franchise.
- Services to and from the Midlands were operated by Central Trains from March 1997. In November 2007, the Central Trains franchise was split up with services through Cambridge becoming part of the Arriva CrossCountry network.
- The Thameslink franchise was operated first by Thameslink, then by First Capital Connect and then by Govia Thameslink Railway in September 2014.

==== Infrastructure ====
On 1 April 1994, Railtrack became responsible for the maintenance of the National Rail infrastructure; it was succeeded by Network Rail in 2002, following financial difficulties.

The CB1 area in front of the station buildings had been due for redevelopment by Ashwell Property Group. In December 2009, the developers went bankrupt and reformed under the name of Brookgate. Part of the redevelopment scheme had included a £1 million contribution towards the Cambridgeshire Guided Busway scheme passing through the area.

A new island platform was brought into operational use in December 2011.

In 2012, the station infrastructure was under scrutiny as it emerged that passengers were forced to queue for over 40 minutes to purchase tickets.

==== Improvements in 2016 ====
In 2014, the station operator Abellio Greater Anglia released plans to improve the station building at Cambridge, as part of the CB1 project. The works include a larger concourse, more ticket gates and machines, with a bigger ticket office. These opened in January 2017.

=== Accidents ===
On 30 May 2015, the 09:14 Great Northern service from London King's Cross failed to stop when entering a platform; it collided at low speed with the stationary train it was due to couple with shortly after 10:00 BST. No damage was caused, but three passengers were slightly injured.

=== Motive power depots ===
==== Main shed ====
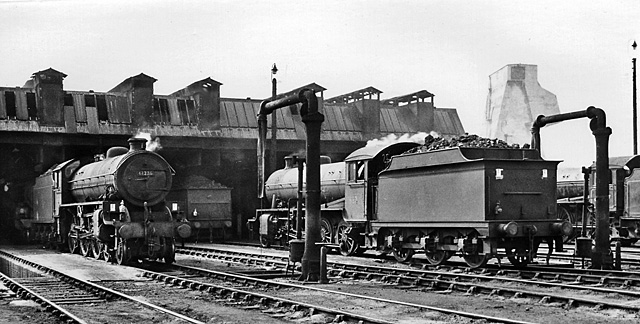
Cambridge Locomotive Depot 2 October 1960

The Eastern Counties Railway opened a small motive power depot at the station in 1845. This was replaced by a larger depot on the west side of the line at the north end of the station in 1847; this became a Great Eastern Railway shed in 1862 and it was enlarged in 1913.

Cambridge was the principal shed of a main Great Eastern district and, during World War 1, was recorded as having 101 drivers and 89 firemen, under an inspector named G. Dorrington. Repairs fell under a foreman fitter who had a staff of 70 men, although responsibility for boiler repairs fell to the foreman boilermaker. There was also a wagon repair facility at the depot at this time, led by a leading carpenter. Finally, another foreman was charged with the day-to-day running of the depot, as well as being responsible for the outstations such as King's Lynn, Ely and Mildenhall. A number of clerks would also have been employed at the depot.

At the end of 1922, the Great Eastern shed at Cambridge had an allocation of 178 locomotives; it was the second biggest shed on the Great Eastern after Stratford. The allocation consisted of:

Class (LNER classification)	Wheel Arrangement	Number allocated
B12	4-6-0	12
D13	4-4-0	13
D14	4-4-0	3
D15	4-4-0	16
E4	2-4-0	18
F3	2-4-2T	3
F4	2-4-2T	1
F7	2-4-2T	4
J15	0-6-0	48
J16	0-6-0	14
J17	0-6-0	6
J18	0-6-0	2
J19	0-6-0	7
J20	0-6-0	11
J65	0-6-0T	2
J66	0-6-0T	4
J67	0-6-0T	8
J68	0-6-0T	1
J69	0-6-0T	4
J70	0-6-0T Tram	1

Further enlargement and improvement of facilities took place in 1932. Most significantly, a mechanical coaling plant was brought into use, as well as the construction of a new lifting shop and modern sand dispensers.

Cambridge shed had two locomotives allocated for royal train workings at this time; Class D15 4-4-0s numbers 8783 and 8787, known as the Royal Clauds, were kept in pristine condition.

Following nationalisation in 1948, the shed was operated by the Eastern Region of British Railways; it was allocated shed code 31A

In the 1950s, there was a dedicated pool of four drivers (known as the Royal Link) based at Cambridge who operated the two royal engines, which were cleaned regularly. The locomotives were Class B2 4-6-0s nos. 61671 Royal Sovereign and 61617 Ford Castle. The link system, which was operated throughout British Railways, was a career progression and, at Cambridge, these included Pilot Links (shunting), Branch Goods, Main line Goods, Branch Passenger and Express links; there were also route specific links to Bletchley, the Great Northern (Hitchin) and Kettering routes.

Cambridge shed received its first allocation of diesels in 1958. The following year, the last 2-4-0 locomotive in traffic on British Railways (Class E4 2-4-0 number 62785) was withdrawn from traffic and has been preserved in its GER guise of no. 490, as part of the National Collection. In 2018, it was on loan to Bressingham steam museum near Diss.

The shed closed on 18 June 1962, and the demolition of Cambridge's loco shed building, repair shops, and loco hoists, leaving the shed offices and stores buildings, took place in 1965. Some of the tracks in the former locomotive yard, next to platform 6, were kept as engine sidings, while the rest were made into a car park.

==== Other sheds ====
The Great Eastern Railway opened a small motive power depot, on the east side of the line at the south end of the station, for its own and Great Northern Railway locomotives in 1879.

At the end of 1922, the Great Northern shed at Cambridge had an allocation of ten locomotives; it consisted of:

Class (LNER classification)	Wheel Arrangement	Number allocated
C1	4-4-2	2
C2	4-4-2	4
D2	4-4-0	4

This was closed by the London and North Eastern Railway in 1924 and used as a wagon works until it was demolished in 1985. The Bedfordshire and Cambridge Railway opened a small motive power depot on the west side of the line at the south end of the station in 1862. This was closed by the London Midland and Scottish Railway on 2 December 1935, but remained in use, unofficially, until 1951. The building was demolished in 1964.

== Building and platforms ==
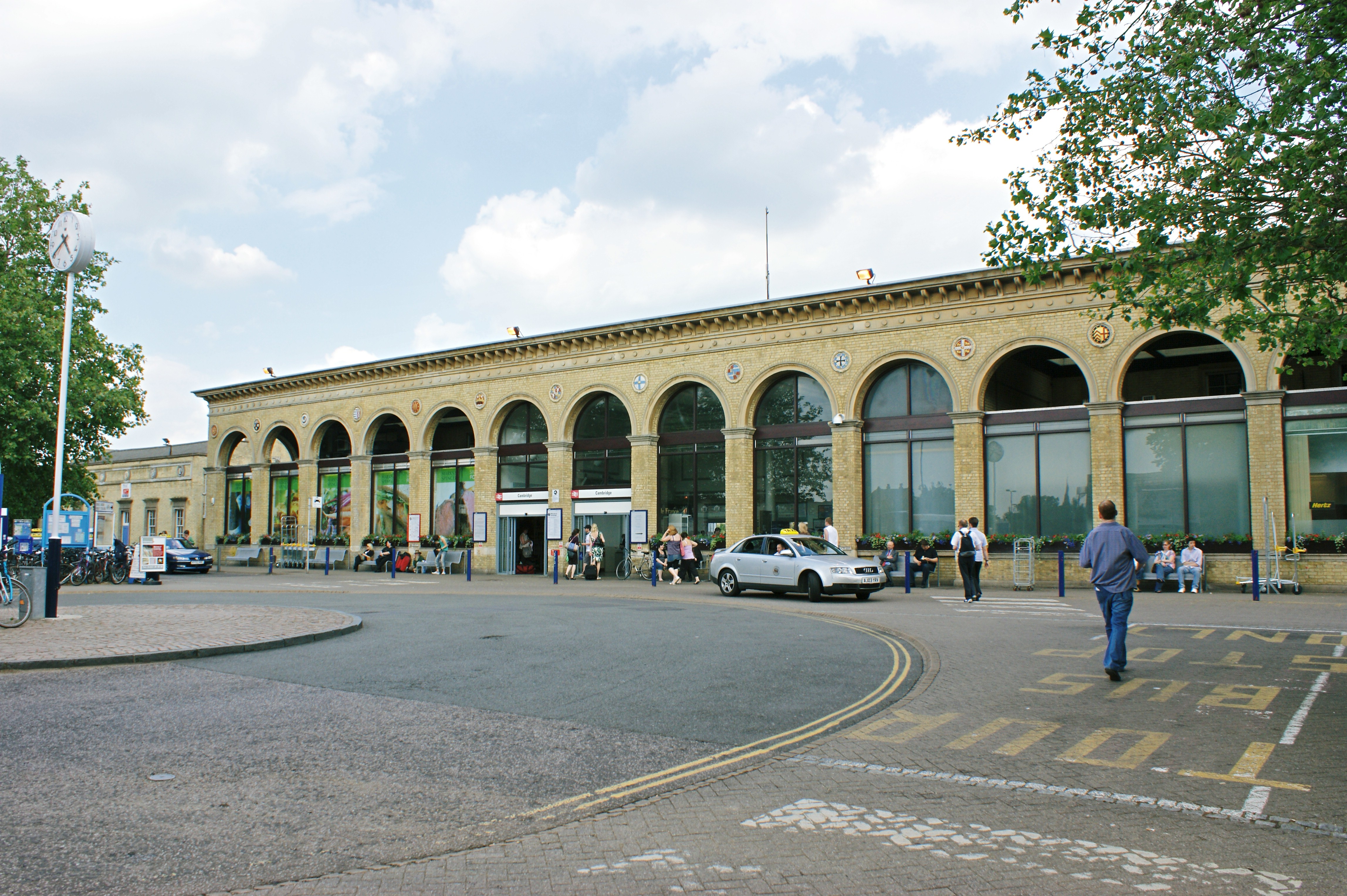
The station building in 2008

The station building, with its long classical façade and porte-cochère, infilled during the 20th century, has been attributed to both Sancton Wood and Francis Thompson and is Grade II listed. The long platform (1 and 4) is typical of its period but was unusual in that (apart from a brief period in the mid-19th century) it was not supplemented by another through platform until platforms 7 and 8 were added in 2011. Two further platforms (9 and 10) are proposed to the east of the station to accommodate additional planned services. There were major platform lengthenings and remodellings of the main building in 1863 and 1908. The station layout was altered in 1896, by deviating the Newmarket line approaches.

The 514 yards (470 m) railway platform is divided into platforms 1 and 4 with a scissors crossover in the middle to divide it in two, which allows trains from either direction to pass those already stopped there. Bay platforms exist at both ends of the station: platforms 2 and 3 at the southern end of the station and platforms 5 and 6 at the northern end. Platforms 7 and 8 are located on an island platform on the eastern side of the station; these came into use in December 2011.

Current usage is as follows:

- Platform 1 is a 12-car bi-directional through platform generally used for northbound services to Ely, King's Lynn and Cambridge North. It is also used for some southbound services to London King’s Cross and Stansted Airport, and for some late evening terminating services.
- Platforms 2 (ten-car) and 3 (eight-car) are south-facing bay platforms generally used for stopping services to and from London King's Cross.
- Platform 4 is a bi-directional 12-car through platform generally used for northbound services to Ely, Norwich, King's Lynn and Birmingham New Street. It is also used for some early morning southbound services to Stansted Airport and for some terminating late evening services.
- Platforms 5 and 6 are six-car north-facing bay platforms generally used for services to and from Ipswich and Norwich (and occasional services to and from Birmingham New Street).
- Platforms 7 and 8 are bi-directional 12-car through platforms generally used for southbound services to King's Cross, Liverpool Street, Stansted Airport and Brighton via London St Pancras International. These platforms are also used for longer terminating trains from Liverpool Street and King's Cross.

== Facilities ==
The station has the following facilities:

- A ticket office, open seven days a week from early morning to late evening
- Step-free access to all platforms
- Sheltered waiting areas
- A car park, with 333 spaces
- Bicycle storage.

== Services ==
Cambridge is served currently by four train operating companies; their typical off-peak services in trains per hour (tph) are as follows:

Greater Anglia:

- 2 tph to London Liverpool Street; of which:
  - 1 tph (semi-fast)
  - 1 tph that calls at all stations on the West Anglia Main Line, then runs semi-fast from Cheshunt onwards
- 1 tph to Norwich, via the Breckland Line; some services start and end at Stansted Airport (semi-fast)
- 1 tph to Ipswich, via the Ipswich–Ely line (all stations); of which:
  - 1 tpd extends to Harwich International, as part of the Dutchflyer service
- 2 tph to Cambridge North; some services extend to Ely during peak times (all stations).

Services use five-car Class 720 and three/four-car Class 755 rolling stock.

CrossCountry:

- 1 tph to Birmingham New Street, via Leicester (semi-fast).
- 1 tph to Stansted Airport (semi-fast); some off-peak services terminate at Cambridge.

These services are operated using three-car Class 170 diesel multiple units.

Great Northern:

- 3 tph to London Kings Cross; of which:
  - 1 tph that calls at all stations on the Cambridge line, before running semi-fast to Kings Cross.
  - 2 tph that call at Cambridge South only, then run non-stop to King's Cross. At peak times these trains call at additional stations on the Cambridge line, often Royston and Letchworth Garden City.
- 2 tph to Kings Lynn, via the Fen Line. Off peak, 1 tph terminates at Ely (all stations).

A mix of four-car Class 379 and Class 387 electric multiple units are used; however, these often run as eight-car double units or 12-car triple units during peak times.

Greater Thameslink Railway:

- 2 tph to Brighton, via London St Pancras (semi-fast).

Services use 12-car Class 700/1 electric multiple units.

Preceding station	National Rail	Following station
Cambridge South	CrossCountry Birmingham to Stansted Airport	Ely
Cambridge South	Thameslink Cambridge Line	Terminus
Cambridge South	Great Northern Cambridge Line	Terminus
Cambridge South	Great Northern Fen Line	Cambridge North
Cambridge South	Greater Anglia West Anglia Main Line	Cambridge North
Cambridge South	Greater Anglia Breckland Line	Cambridge North
Terminus	Greater Anglia Ipswich to Ely Line	Dullingham
	Future Services	
Cambridge South	East West Rail Oxford-Norwich	Ely
Cambridge South	East West Rail Oxford-Ipswich	Cambridge East
	Disused railways	
Lord's Bridge Line and station closed	British Railways Varsity Line	Terminus
Histon Line and station closed	Great Eastern Railway Cambridge to Huntingdon	Terminus
	Historical railways	
Harston Line open, station closed	British Railways Cambridge Line	Terminus
Barnwell Junction Line open, station closed	Great Eastern Railway Cambridge to Mildenhall	Terminus
Terminus	Newmarket and Chesterford Railway	Cherryhinton Line open, station closed

=== Future services ===
A new East West Rail route is being developed, allowing travel between Oxford and Cambridge without needing to go via London, which has not been possible since the Varsity Line was closed in the 1960s. The section between Oxford and Bletchley is complete; the first test train ran on 22 October 2024 and scheduled passenger services were expected to start in 2025. (Note: As of May 2026, services have still not commenced, due an industrial dispute.)

The section from Bedford to Cambridge is more difficult, as parts of the Varsity Line route have been built on and thus an entirely new alignment is needed. The preferred route runs from the Cambridge South station (opened in 2026), via new stations at Cambourne and Tempsford, and then on to Bedford. The government has committed £10 million of funding as part of the 2016 Autumn Statement to continue to develop the route.

In November 2025, East West Rail proposed that a new station at Cambridge East should be built on the line to serve the Cambridge Airport site, which has been identified as a location for redevelopment as a new suburb of the city.

== Onward transport links ==
Several local bus services by Stagecoach in Cambridge and Whippet Coaches stop immediately south-west of the main station building. There are nine stops linking the railway with the city centre and other parts of Cambridge, including Addenbrooke's Hospital.

The southern section of the Cambridgeshire Guided Busway connects directly to the station, allowing buses to run from Trumpington via the station to St. Ives and Huntingdon. Buses also travel from the station out of the city to Sawston and Saffron Walden.

Since February 2016, a three-storey cycle parking facility, with up to 2,850 spaces, has been open, named Cambridge Cycle Point. It is located in a building just to the north of the main station entrance.

A taxi rank is located just outside the main entrance.
