= Sheep's Green Bridge =

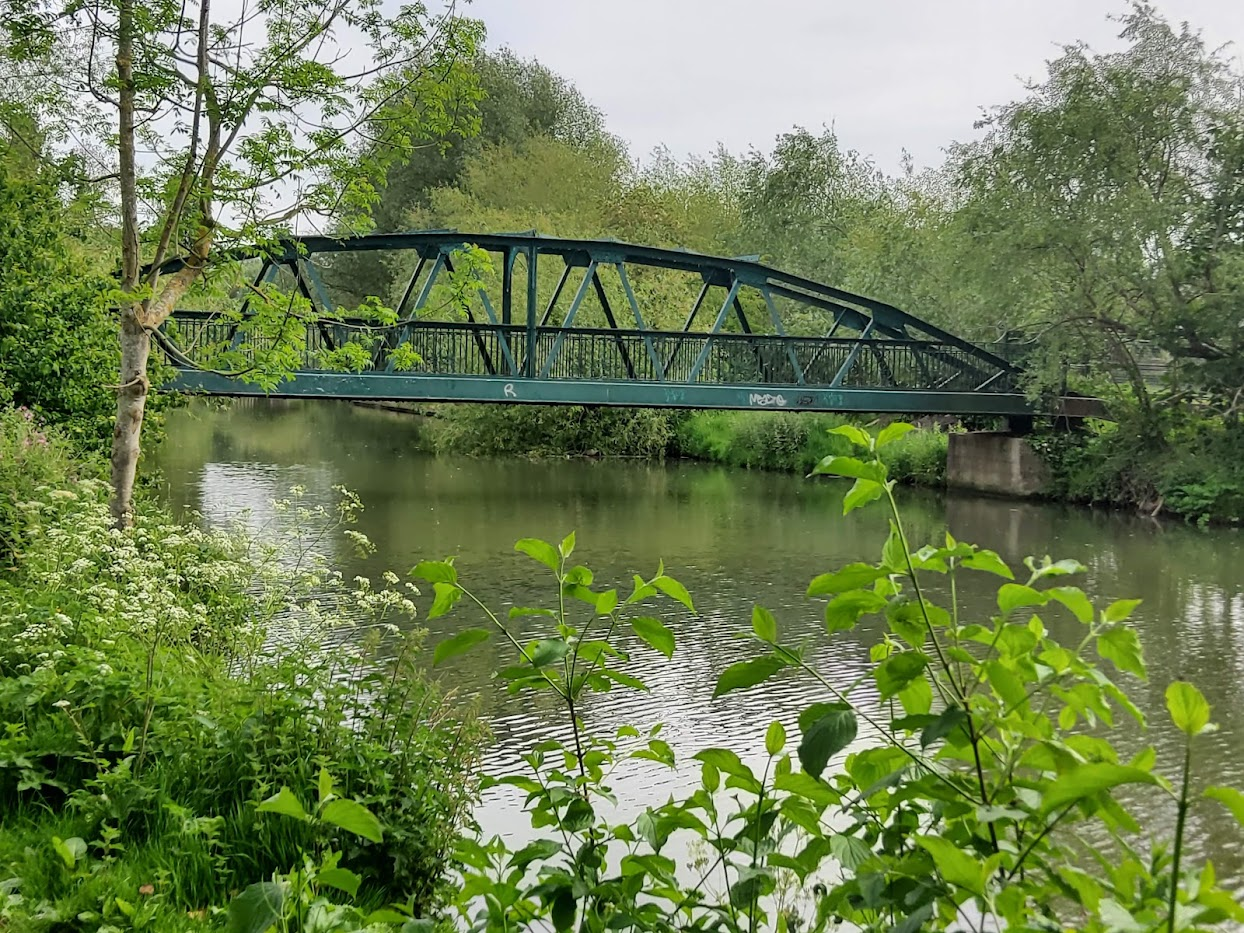
- Coordinates: 52°11′43″N 0°06′59″E
- Crosses: River Cam
- Locale: Sheep's Green, Cambridge, England
- Preceded by: Brasley Bridge
- Followed by: Fen Road Bridge

Characteristics
- No. of spans: One

History
- Construction end: 1910; 2006 (reconstruction)

Location
- Location within Cambridge

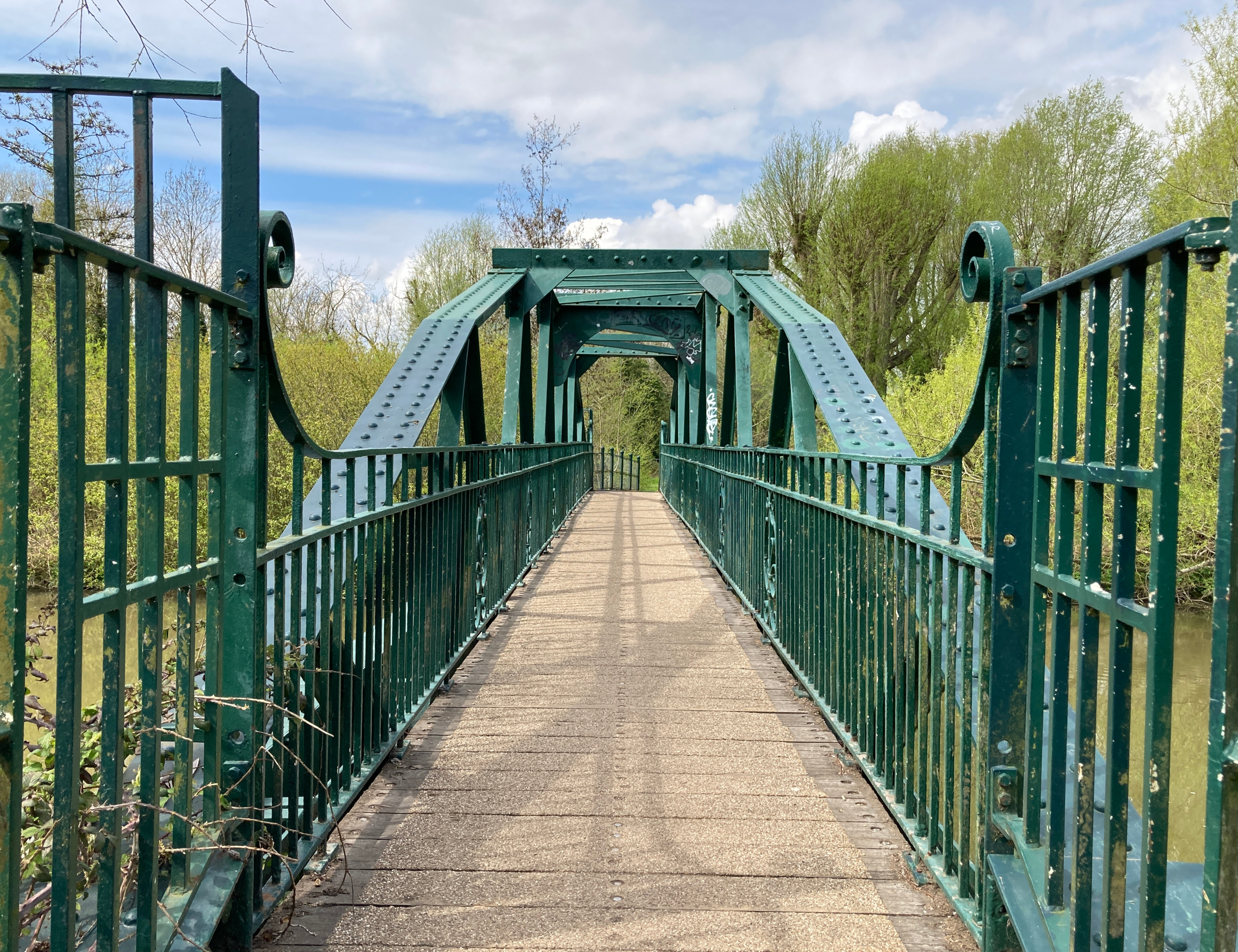
The approach to the bridge from the east bank.

Sheep's Green Bridge is a footbridge over the River Cam in Cambridge, England. It is the second bridge on the river as it flows into Cambridge. It connects Coe Fen near Sheep's Green and Lammas Land. The bridge was opened in 1910 to replace the chain ferry taking ladies over to the bathing place on Sheep's Green. After deterioration in the bridge's condition it was reconstructed in 2006, the decking was relaid and the steps were replaced with ramps.

The bridge is featured in the music video for "High Hopes" by the English Rock Band Pink Floyd, released in 1994.

== See also ==
- List of bridges in Cambridge
- Template:River Cam map
