= Fen Road Bridge =

Bridge in Cambridge, England

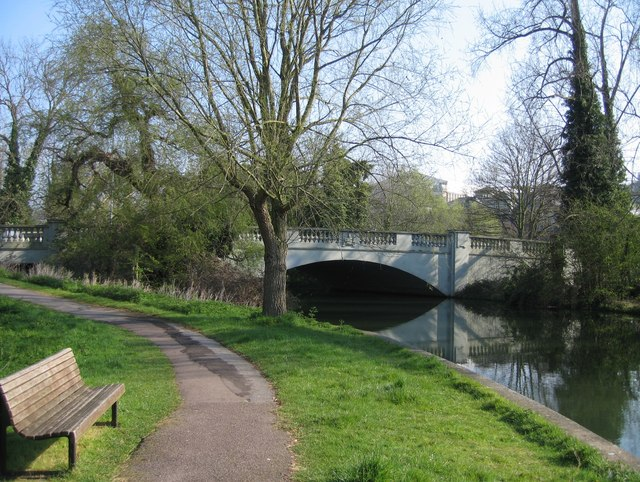
- Coordinates: 52.1974°N 0.1183°E
- Crosses: River Cam
- Locale: Coe Fen, Cambridge
- Preceded by: Sheep's Green Bridge
- Followed by: Crusoe Bridge, Cambridge

Characteristics
- Design: Arch bridge
- Material: Concrete

History
- Construction end: 1926

Fen Road Bridge or Fen Causeway Bridge is the third river Cam bridge overall and the first road bridge on its upstream in Cambridge. The road was formally opened on 9 December 1926.

== See also ==
- List of bridges in Cambridge
- Template:River Cam map
