= Garret Hostel Bridge =

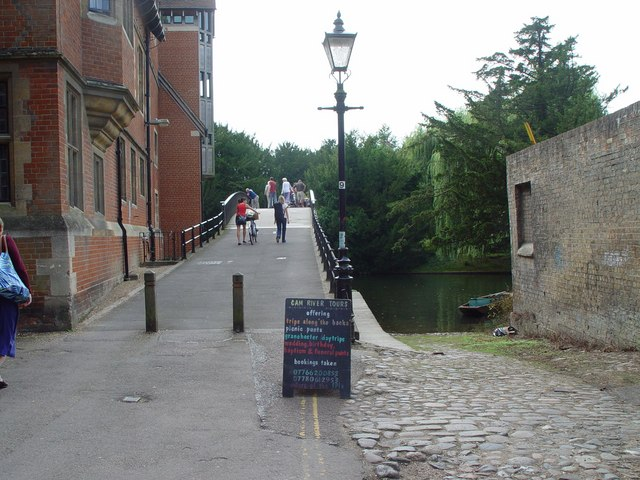
- Garret Hostel Bridge in Cambridge, England
- Coordinates: 52°12′21″N 0°06′50″E
- Crosses: River Cam
- Locale: The Backs, Cambridge, England
- Other name: Orgasm Bridge
- Preceded by: Clare College Bridge
- Followed by: Trinity College Bridge

Characteristics
- Design: arch bridge
- Material: Prestressed concrete
- No. of spans: 1

History
- Designer: Timothy Guy Morgan
- Construction end: about 1960

Location
- Location of Garret Hostel Bridge in Cambridge

Garret Hostel Bridge, colloquially known as Orgasm Bridge, is a foot and cycle bridge over the River Cam in Cambridge, England.

Garret Hostel Bridge is the tenth bridge overall and the sixth bridge over the River Cam's middle stream in Cambridge.

The bridge is at the end of Garret Hostel Lane, which was named after a building that was acquired in 1329 by Michaelhouse, a former college of the university. Garrett Hostel was demolished in the 17th century.

The first bridge was constructed in 1455. The current bridge was designed by Timothy Guy Morgan around 1960 when an undergraduate at the University of Cambridge's School of Architecture. Garret Hostel Bridge is one of three public bridges that link the city centre to The Backs; the other two are Silver Street Bridge and Magdalene Bridge.

== See also ==
- List of bridges in Cambridge
- Template:River Cam map
