= Brasley Bridge =

Bridge in Cambridge, England

Brasley Bridge Trumpington Bridge
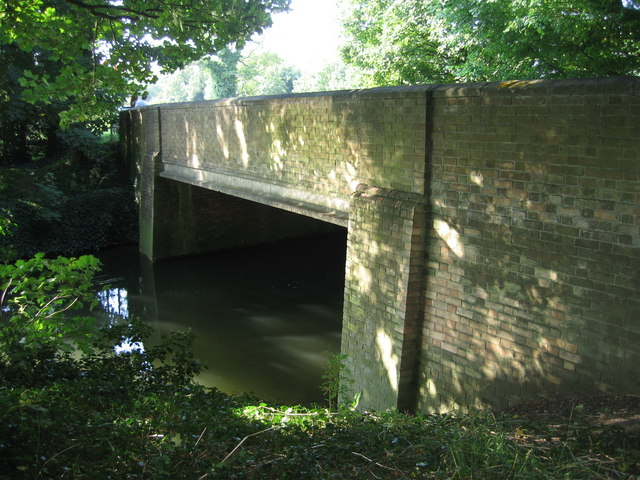
- Coordinates: 52°10′27″N 0°06′05″E
- Crosses: River Cam
- Locale: Trumpington, Cambridge
- Followed by: Sheep's Green Bridge

Characteristics
- Design: beam bridge
- Material: Reinforced concrete

History
- Construction end: 2015

Brasley Bridge or Trumpington Bridge is the first river Cam bridge on its upstream in Cambridge. It is located near Grantchester Road and connects Grantchester and Trumpington.

== History ==
- 1790 - the first wooden bridge near the ford replaced a brick construction
- 1954 - reconstructed for cars
- 2015 - from February to September 2015 it was reconstructed using the reinforced concrete

== See also ==
- List of bridges in Cambridge
- Template:River Cam map
