= Elizabeth Way, Cambridge =

Road and bridge in Cambridge, England

Coordinates: 52°12′40″N 0°08′12″E

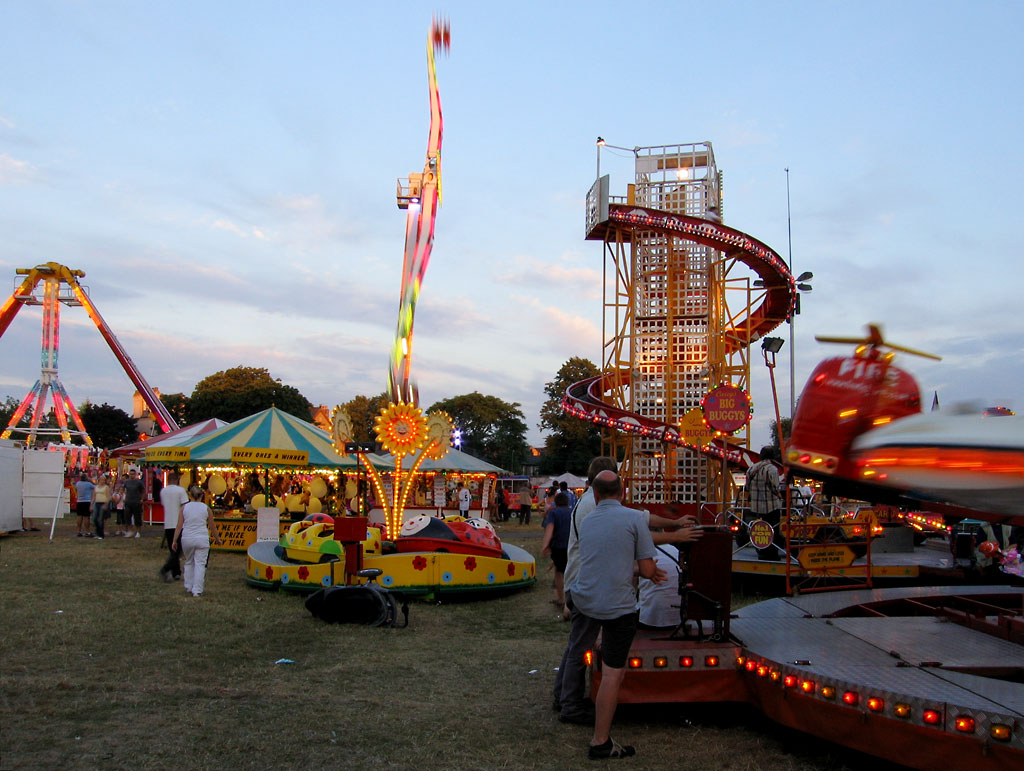
Cambridge Midsummer Fair on Midsummer Common west of Elizabeth Way, 2005.

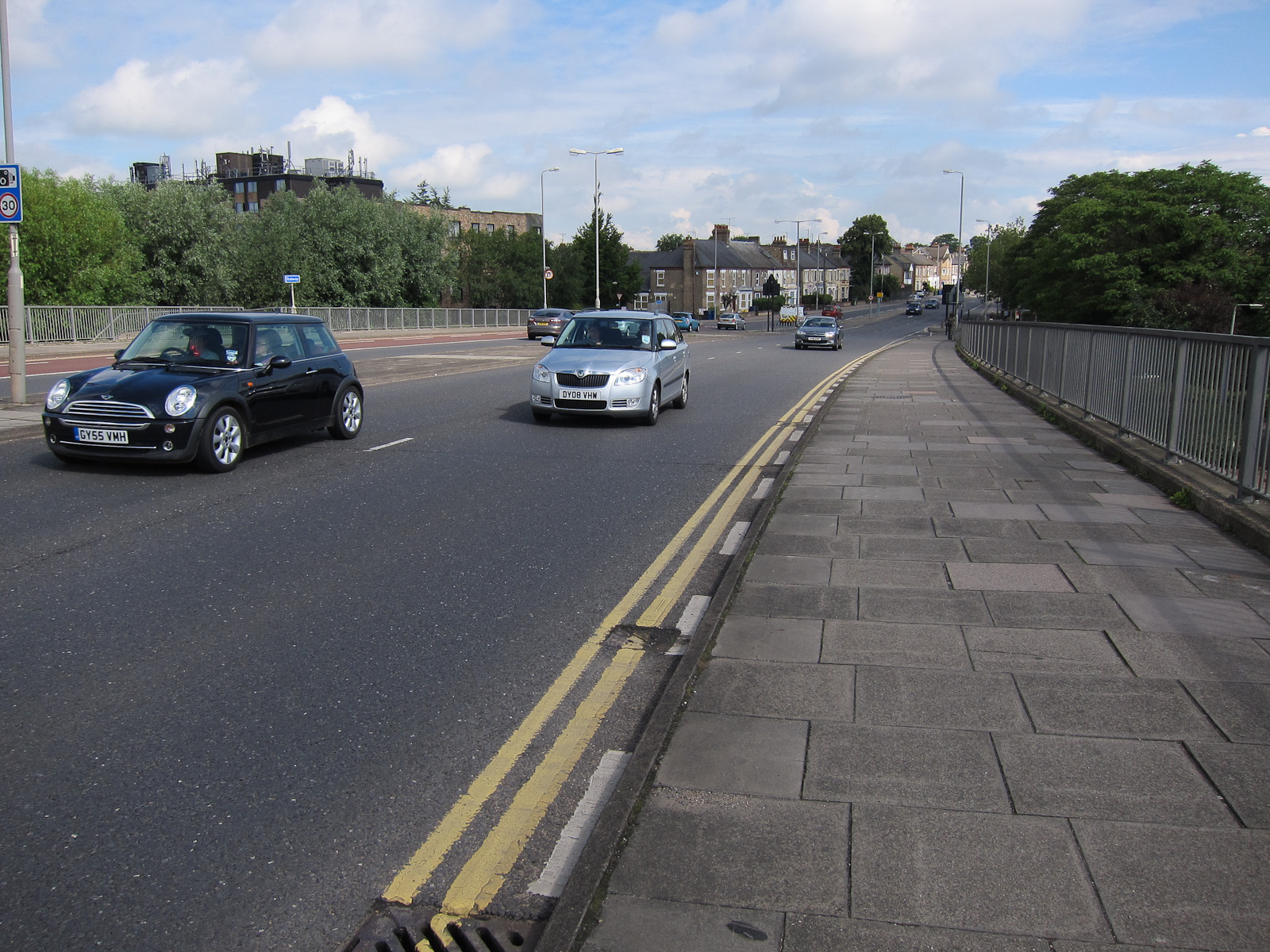
Looking north from the northern end of Elizabeth Way Bridge.

Elizabeth Way is a road in northeast Cambridge, England. It is designated the A1134 and forms part of Cambridge's inner ring road. At the northern end is a roundabout forming a junction with Milton Road (continuing the A1134 to the left and as the A1309 northeast out of Cambridge to the right). Near the north end is another roundabout linking with Chesterton Road (the A1303) to the west. At the southern end there is a roundabout that links with East Road (part of the A603, continuing the inner ring road southeast) and Newmarket Road (also part of the A1134, leading east out of the city).

Just north of the Newmarket Road roundabout to the west is a former site of Cambridge Regional College, a further education college now located on Kings Hedges Road; before the Regional College was there, the site was a school. As of 2011, the site is under development for residential use. The houses on Elizabeth Way are mainly terraced and semi-detached.

Midsummer Fair was granted in 1211 and held in June each year on Midsummer Common in the area around the modern Elizabeth Way. It is now a modern travelling funfair.

The northern part of the road in Chesterton was known as Haig Road and Cam Road, before it was linked across the River Cam by Elizabeth Way Bridge. Elizabeth Way is named after Queen Elizabeth II.

== Bridge ==
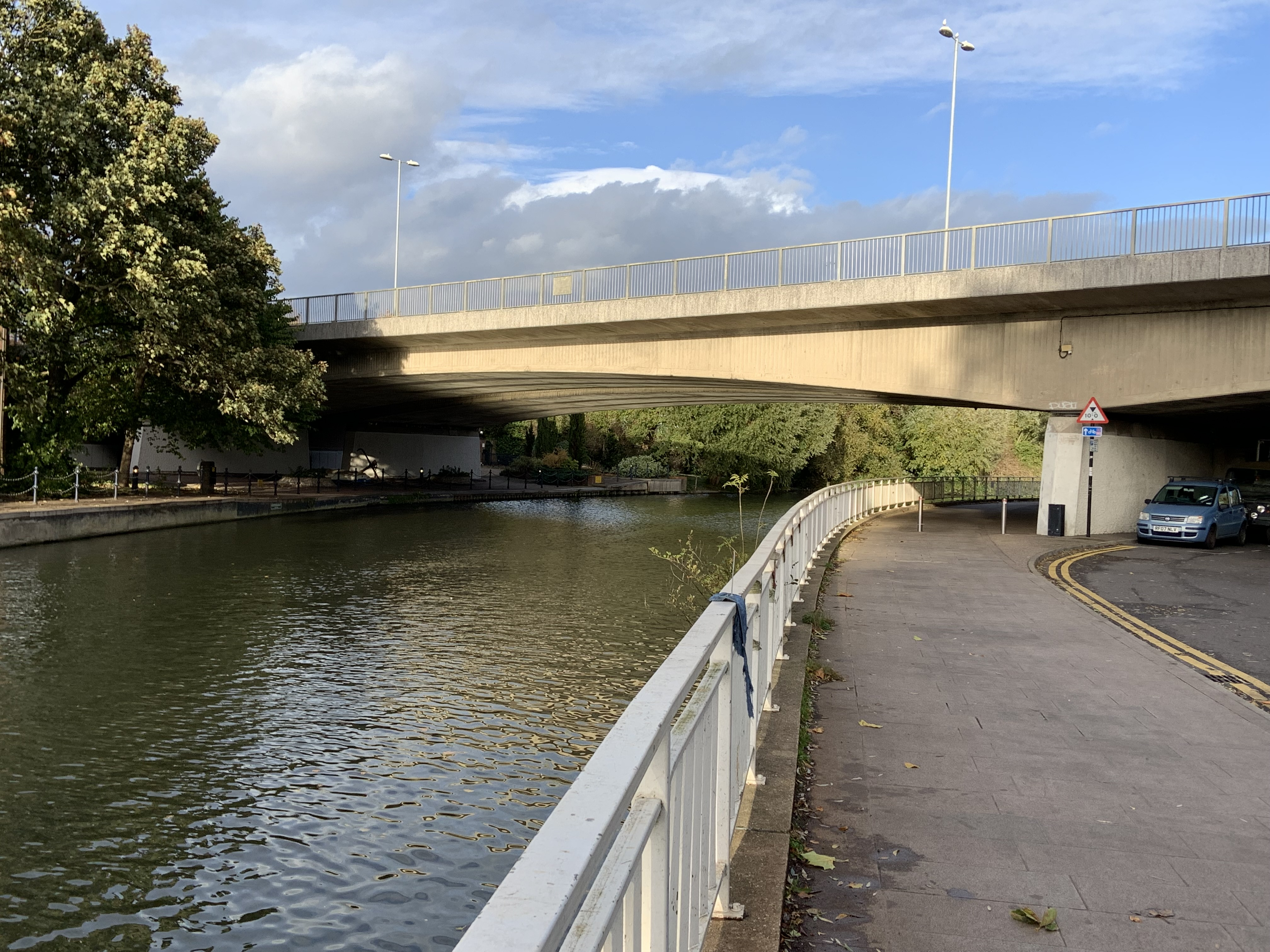
Elizabeth Way Bridge.

Elizabeth Way Bridge on Elizabeth Way crosses the River Cam just to the north of the Newmarket Road roundabout, with Midsummer Common to the west. In the 19th century, Chesterton to the north was not formally part of Cambridge. Links to the city were not good because of the River Cam, which blocked the way. Until 1890, the only bridge access into Cambridge from Chesterton was via Magdalene Bridge (the "Great Bridge") to the west. In 1889, the Cam Bridges Act enabled two new bridges to be constructed between Chesterton and Cambridge. In 1890 the first of these was built, Victoria Bridge on Victoria Avenue, between Jesus Green and Midsummer Common.

In 1911, Chesterton was incorporated into Cambridge and a new bridge was promised by 1917. However, with the outbreak of World War I, this never happened. In 1950, a report state that the construction of a second Chesterton bridge should be undertaken a matter of urgency. Eventually, in 1971, the Elizabeth Way Bridge was opened, on the proposed 1950 route.

The bridge is a plain four-carriageway concrete bridge. It was formally opened by Rab Butler in his capacity as High Steward of Cambridge on 13 July 1971. It is still the most recent road bridge to be built in Cambridge and is now one of the main vehicular bridges across the Cam in the city.

To the west on the northern bank of the Cam is The Eights, a private marina and apartment blocks.

== See also ==
- List of bridges in Cambridge
