= Darwin College Bridges =

- Crosses: River Cam
- Locale: Darwin College, Cambridge
- Preceded by: Crusoe Bridge
- Followed by: Silver Street Bridge

Characteristics
- Design: truss bridge and beam bridge
- Material: Wood

Darwin College Bridges are the fourth and fifth river Cam bridges overall and two first bridges on its middle stream in Cambridge. Bridges made of timber connect the college grounds with the college's two islands.

== History ==
In 1886 George Darwin and his family moved into 3 Silver Street, at that time a detached house, and named it Newnham Grange. Having also named the island to the rear of the house "Little Island" to distinguish it from the larger island between it and the Mill Pond, they requested permission to build a bridge and obtained a 25-year lease to the islands from the city corporation. The resulting footbridge appears on the Ordnance Survey map of 1888, having been built by Mr Saint for £12.10s. A second bridge joining Little Island to Big Island was also built prior to 1901, crossing small side channels.

The house and bridges became part of Darwin College in 1964.

== See also ==
- List of bridges in Cambridge
- Template:River Cam map
