= Crusoe Bridge =

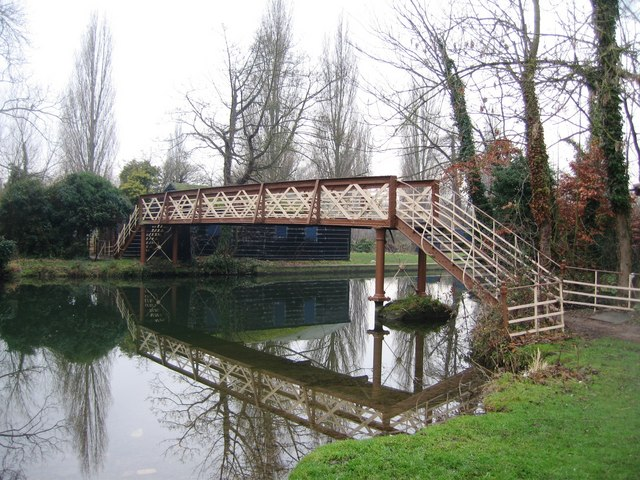
- Coordinates: 52.1982°N 0.1177°E
- Crosses: River Cam
- Locale: Coe Fen, Cambridge England
- Preceded by: Fen Road Bridge
- Followed by: Darwin College Bridges

Characteristics
- Design: Beam bridge
- Material: Steel and wood

Crusoe Bridge is a footbridge over the River Cam in Cambridge, England. It is the fourth bridge over the Cam in the city, and is the last footbridge on its upper upstream in Cambridge. It connects Coe Fen with Sheep's Green, the wooden deck is on 4 steel piers. The bridge name is derived from the nearby 'Robinson Crusoe Island'.

== See also ==
- List of bridges in Cambridge
- Template:River Cam map
