= Trinity College Bridge =

Trinity Bridge
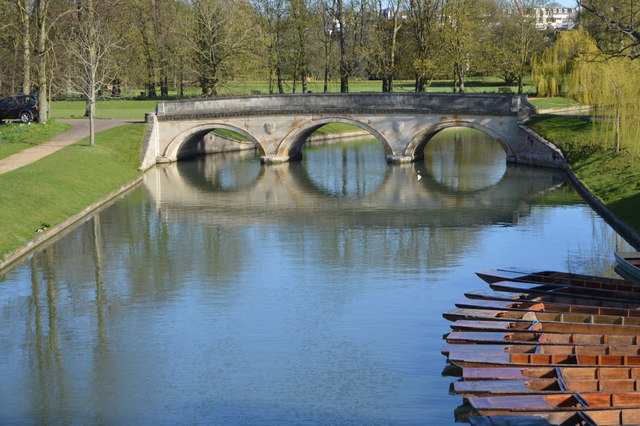
- Trinity Bridge in Cambridge, England
- Coordinates: 52°12′23.92″N 0°06′49.87″E
- Crosses: River Cam
- Locale: Trinity College, Cambridge
- Preceded by: Garret Hostel Bridge
- Followed by: Kitchen Bridge

Characteristics
- Design: triple-arch bridge
- Material: Portland and Ketton stone

History
- Designer: James Essex
- Construction end: 1765

Location
- Location of Trinity Bridge in Cambridge

Trinity Bridge is the eleventh bridge overall and the seventh bridge over the River Cam's middle stream in Cambridge. The bridge is part of the Avenue, which connects the main buildings of Trinity College with the Trinity College Fellows' Garden, across Queen's Road. It is a Grade I listed building.

The triple-arch road bridge was built of Portland and Ketton stone in 1764-5 to the designs of James Essex. The material for the bridge's construction was partially sourced from the old bridge of 1651-2. The old bridge itself replaced an earlier one, destroyed by the Parliamentarian forces in the English Civil War.

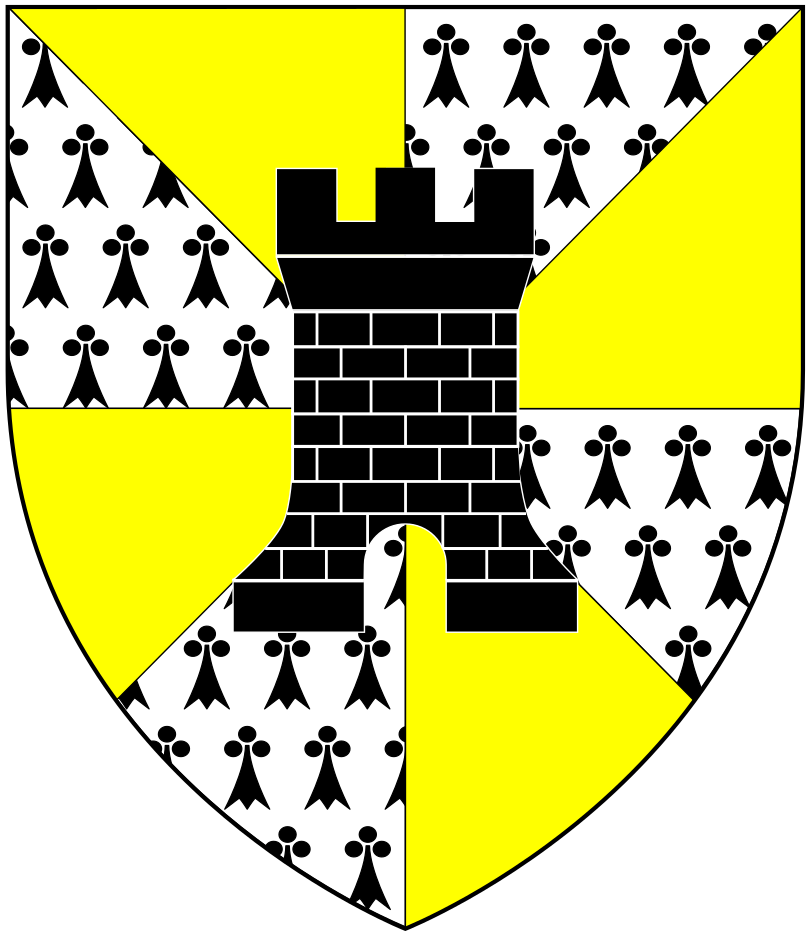
Hooper family coat of arms

The cost for the bridge's construction was defrayed from a bequest from Dr. Francis Hooper (1694-1763), a Senior Fellow at Trinity College. Consequently, the bridge bears the triple-turreted coat of arms of the Hooper family, as well as that of Trinity College.

== See also ==
- List of bridges in Cambridge
- Template:River Cam map
- Trinity College, Cambridge
