= Sheep's Green and Coe Fen =

Local Nature Reserve in Cambridge, England

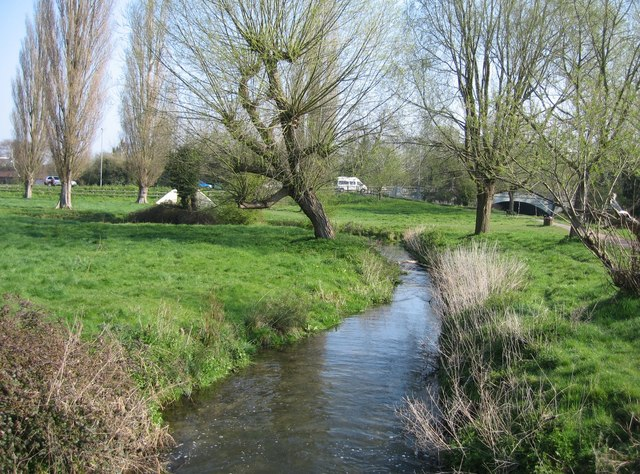
- Stream on Sheep's Green
- Interactive map of Sheep's Green and Coe Fen
- Type: Local Nature Reserve
- Location: Cambridge
- OS grid: TL 447 575
- Coordinates: 52.197°N 0.1157°E
- Area: 16.9 hectares (42 acres)
- Manager: Cambridge City Council

Sheep's Green and Coe Fen is a 16.9 hectare Local Nature Reserve in Cambridge. It is owned and managed by Cambridge City Council.

These seasonally flooded grazing grounds are divided by an arm of the River Cam, with Sheep's Green to the west and Coe Fen to the east, and Sheep's Green is bounded on its west side by another arm of the river. There are waterfowl such as egrets, kingfishers and herons, and water voles are increasing in numbers. There are a number of mature willow trees.

There is access from The Fen Causeway, which crosses both parts of the reserve.

They were traditional grazing sites for sheep and cattle, and Charles Darwin is said to have conducted many beetle surveys on the site.

In wet weather the patterns of ancient streams meandering across Sheep's Green are visible. The land is a flood plain and is prone to flooding events.
