= List of bridges in Cambridge =

The following is a list and brief history of the bridges in Cambridge, England, principally those over the River Cam of which there are 26 (as of 2021).

The River Cam enters Cambridge from the south west of the city and heads north past many of the historic colleges of the University of Cambridge along the open area known as The Backs. After passing St John's College, it turns sharply and runs east, passing the weir at Jesus Green and the boathouses alongside Midsummer Common. Passing Chesterton, it turns north again and leaves the city, running a further 12 mi (19 km) before merging with the Great Ouse at Pope's Corner to the south of Ely.

== Bridges over the River Cam (south to north) ==
=== Upper River (upstream of mill pond weir) ===
==== Trumpington Bridge (1790) ====
The most upstream bridge in Cambridge (UK Parliament constituency) lies along Grantchester Road between Grantchester and Trumpington. Also known as Brasel Bridge, this 1790 brick bridge replaced a wooden bridge at the site of a ford.

==== Sheep's Green Bridge (1910) ====
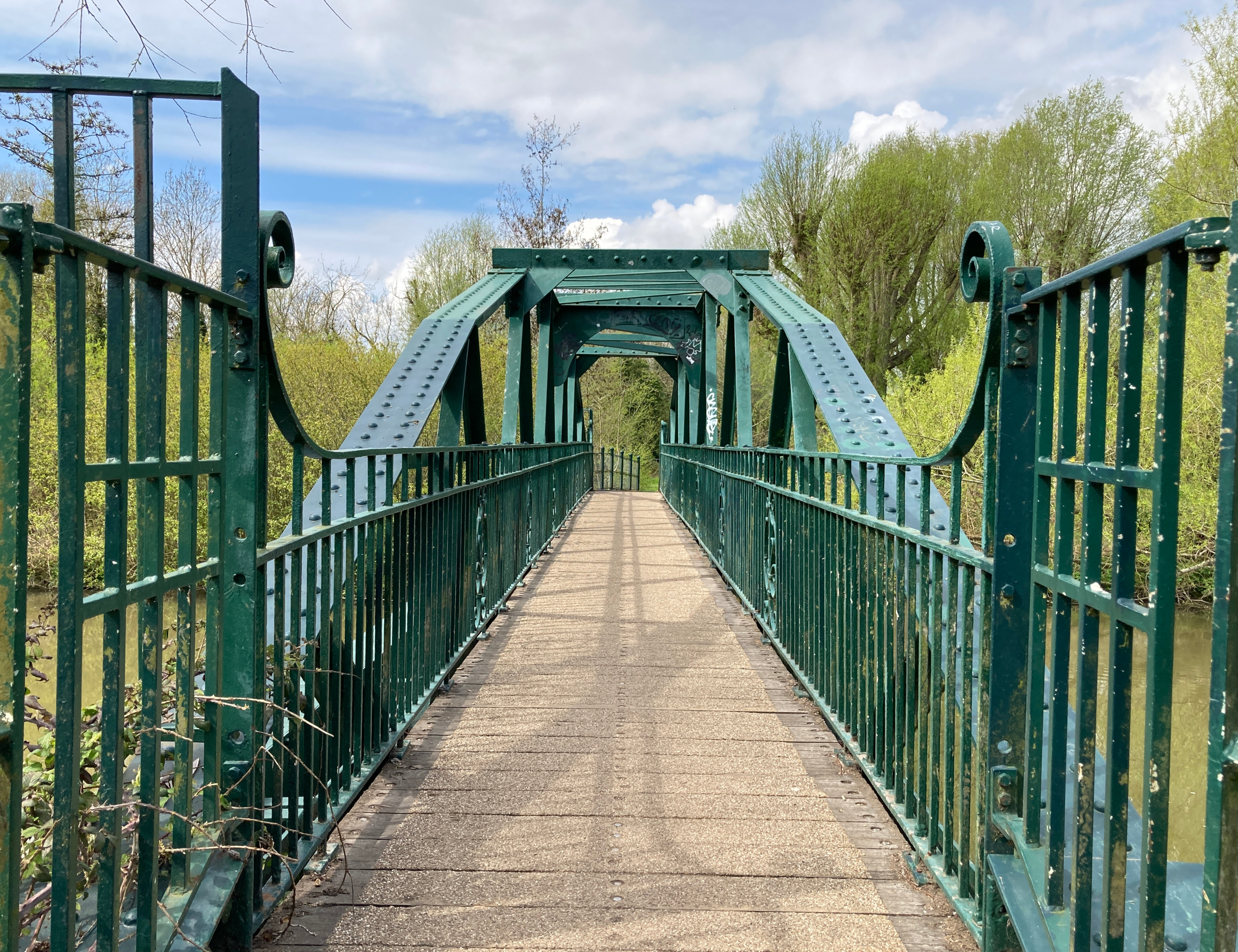
Deck of Sheep's Green Bridge

Footbridge linking Coe Fen behind The Leys School over a second small bridge to Lammas Land, near the area known as Hobson's Paradise. Closed in the second quarter of 2006 to replace the steps with ramps to make it easier for cyclists and prams to cross. The bridge decking was also replaced.^{map 1}

==== Fen Causeway Bridge (1926) ====
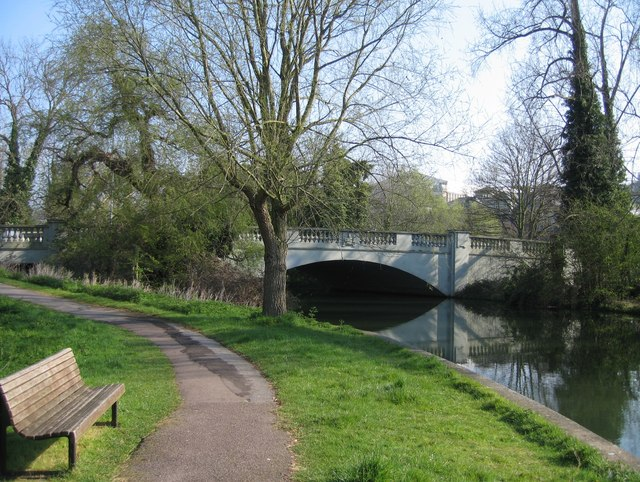
Fen Causeway Bridge

The first road bridge that is reached as the river enters the city. The road was formally opened on 9 December 1926.^{map 2}

==== Crusoe Bridge (1898–99) ====
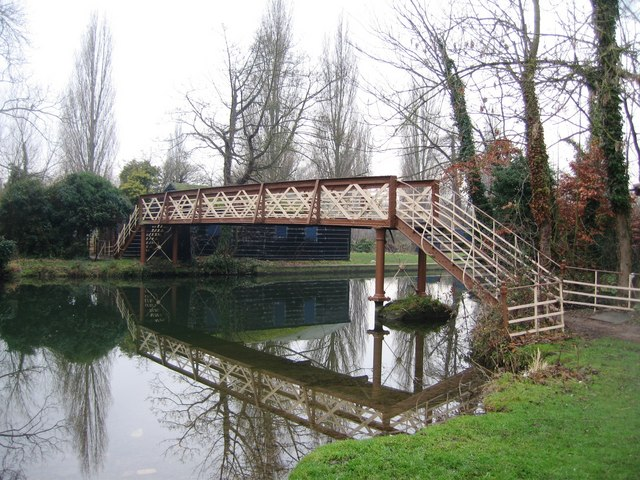
Crusoe Bridge

A steel footbridge with timber deck and supported on four cast-iron columns, linking Sheep's Green and Coe Fen, and the final bridge on the 'Upper River' before it reaches the small weir at the mill pond.^{map 3}

=== Middle River (between mill pond weir and Jesus Green weir) ===
==== Darwin College Bridges (c.1886) ====
Two wooden bridges within the college grounds connecting the main site with the college's two islands.^{map 4}

==== Silver Street Bridge (1958) ====
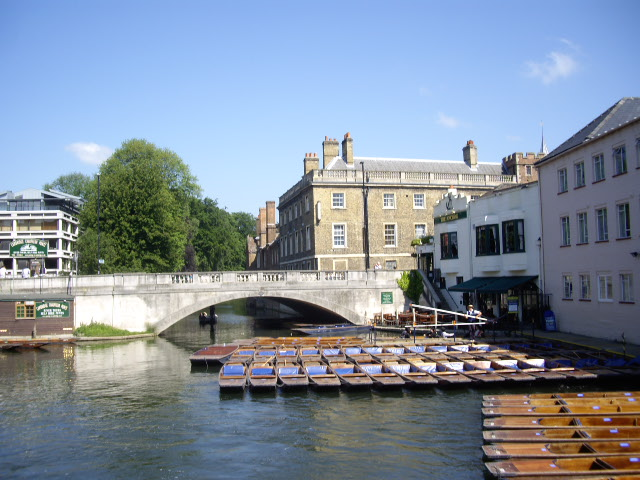
Silver Street Bridge

The site of bridges back to the 14th century, a cast iron bridge was built in 1843 but increasing heavy traffic led to a 1913 survey that determined the need for a new bridge. Repairs, however, allowed the bridge to last for a further 40 years. The present wide bridge, clad in Portland stone was designed by Sir Edwin Lutyens in 1932 and built in 1958–9.^{map 5}

==== Mathematical Bridge, Queens' College (1902) ====
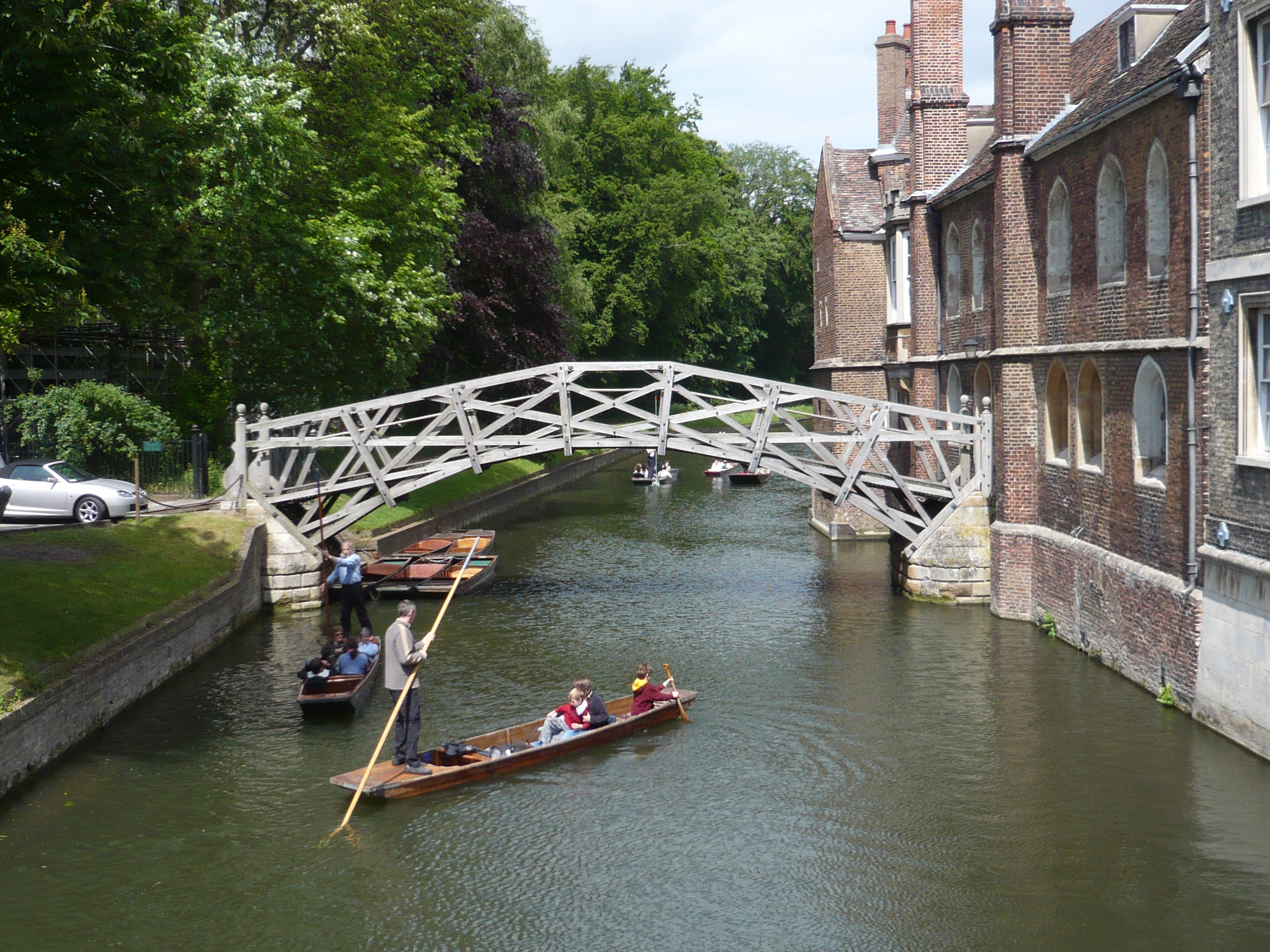
Mathematical Bridge

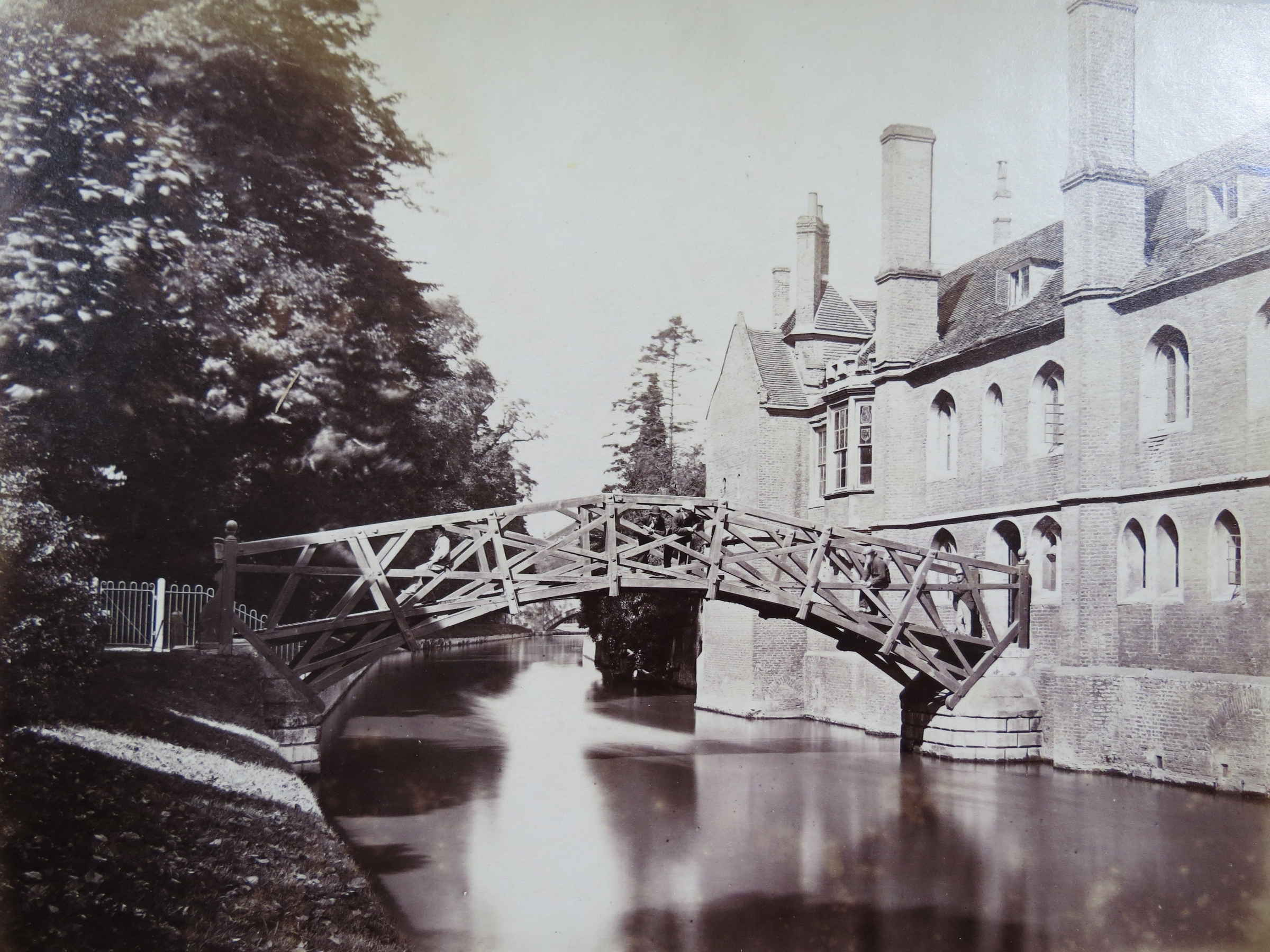
Mathematical Bridge

This is the third version of the design, first built in 1749.^{map 6}

==== King's College Bridge (1819) ====
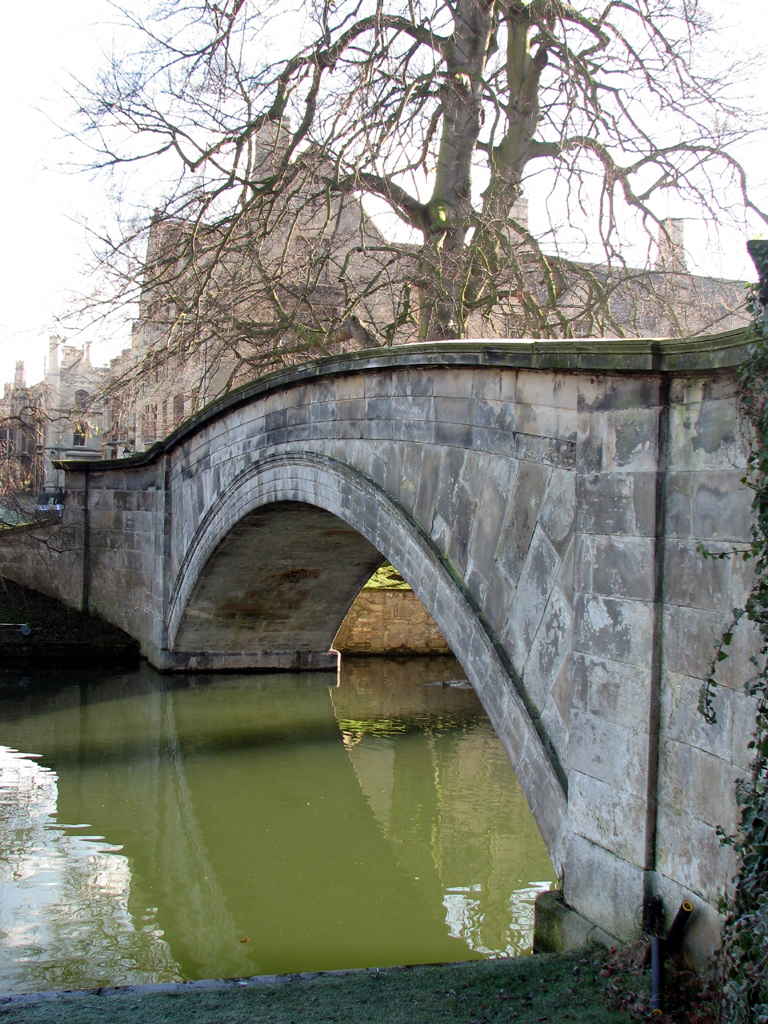
King's College Bridge

The first bridge on the site was built in the 15th century, but situated around 20 metres to the north, and was rebuilt several times before moving to the present incarnation in 1819, designed by William Wilkins and built by Francis Braidwood.^{map 7}

==== Clare College Bridge (1640) ====
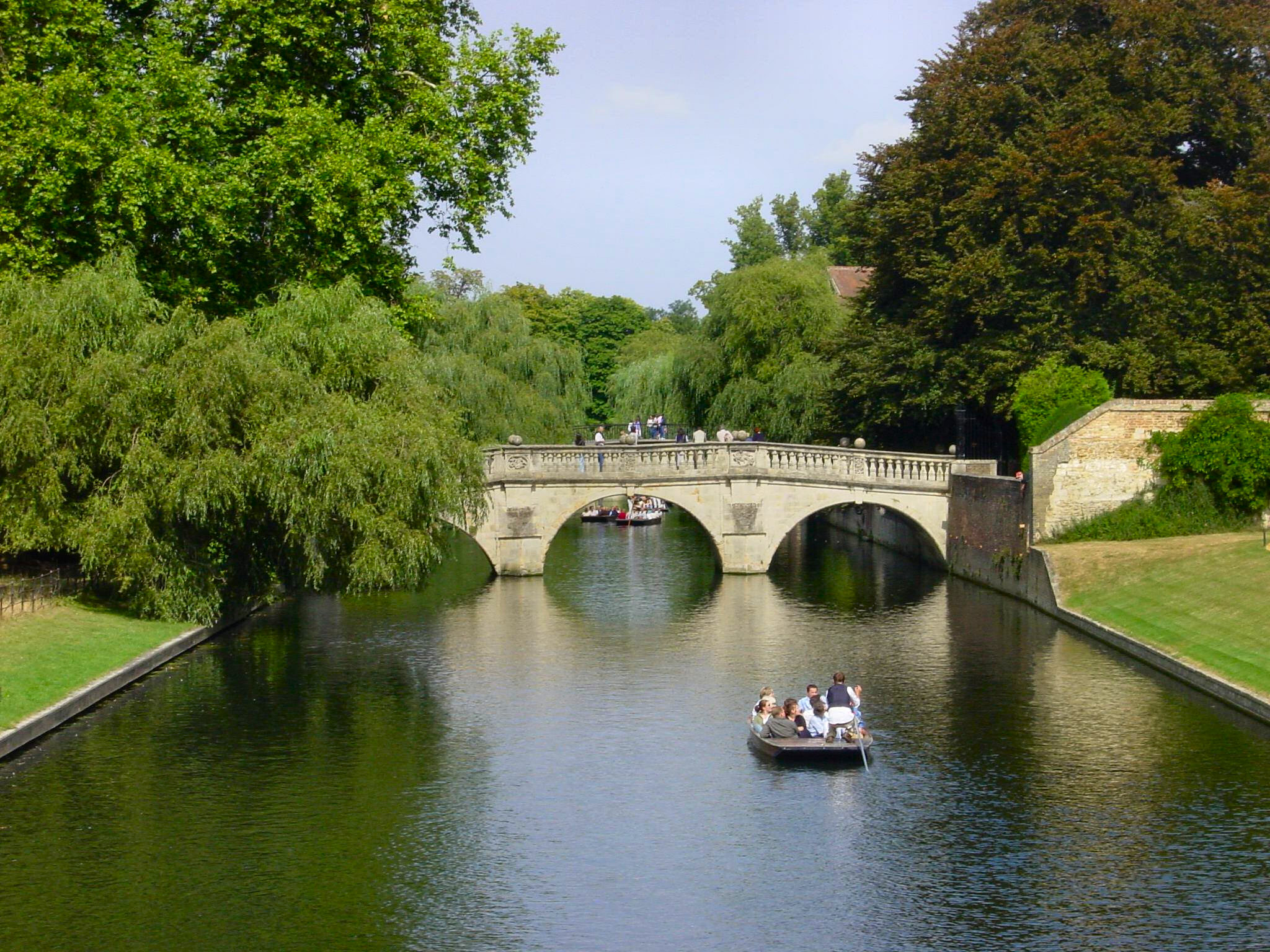
Clare College Bridge

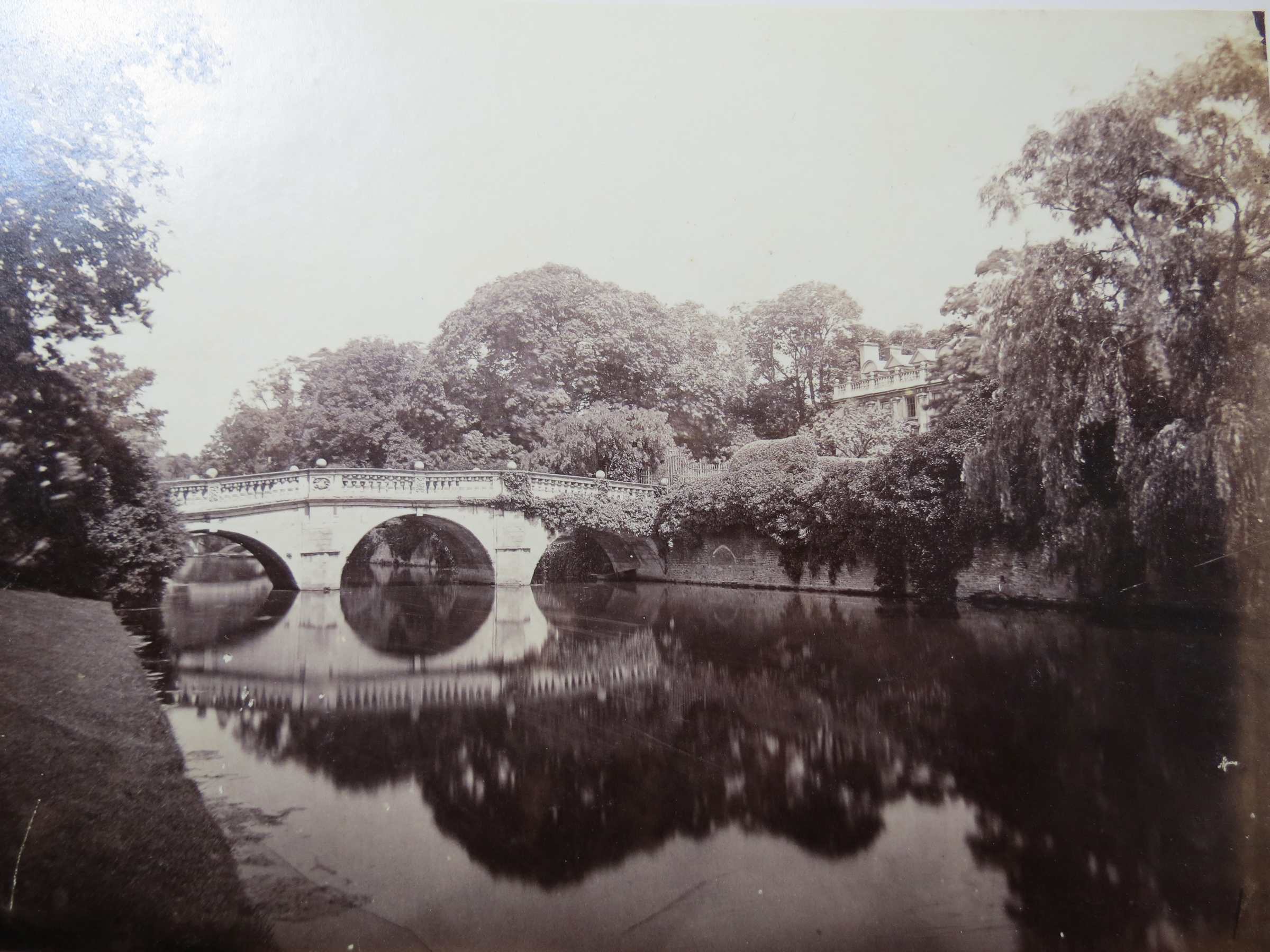
Clare College Bridge

The oldest of Cambridge's current bridges, this bridge in classical style was built in 1639–40 by Thomas Grumbold (d.1659). Many different stories are told to explain the missing section of the globe second from the left on the south side of the bridge. One rumour is that the builder of the bridge received (what he considered to be) insufficient payment, and in his anger, removed a segment of the globe; another is that complete bridges were subject to a tax at the time it was built, and the missing segment made the bridge incomplete and hence untaxed.^{map 8}

==== Garret Hostel Bridge (1960) ====
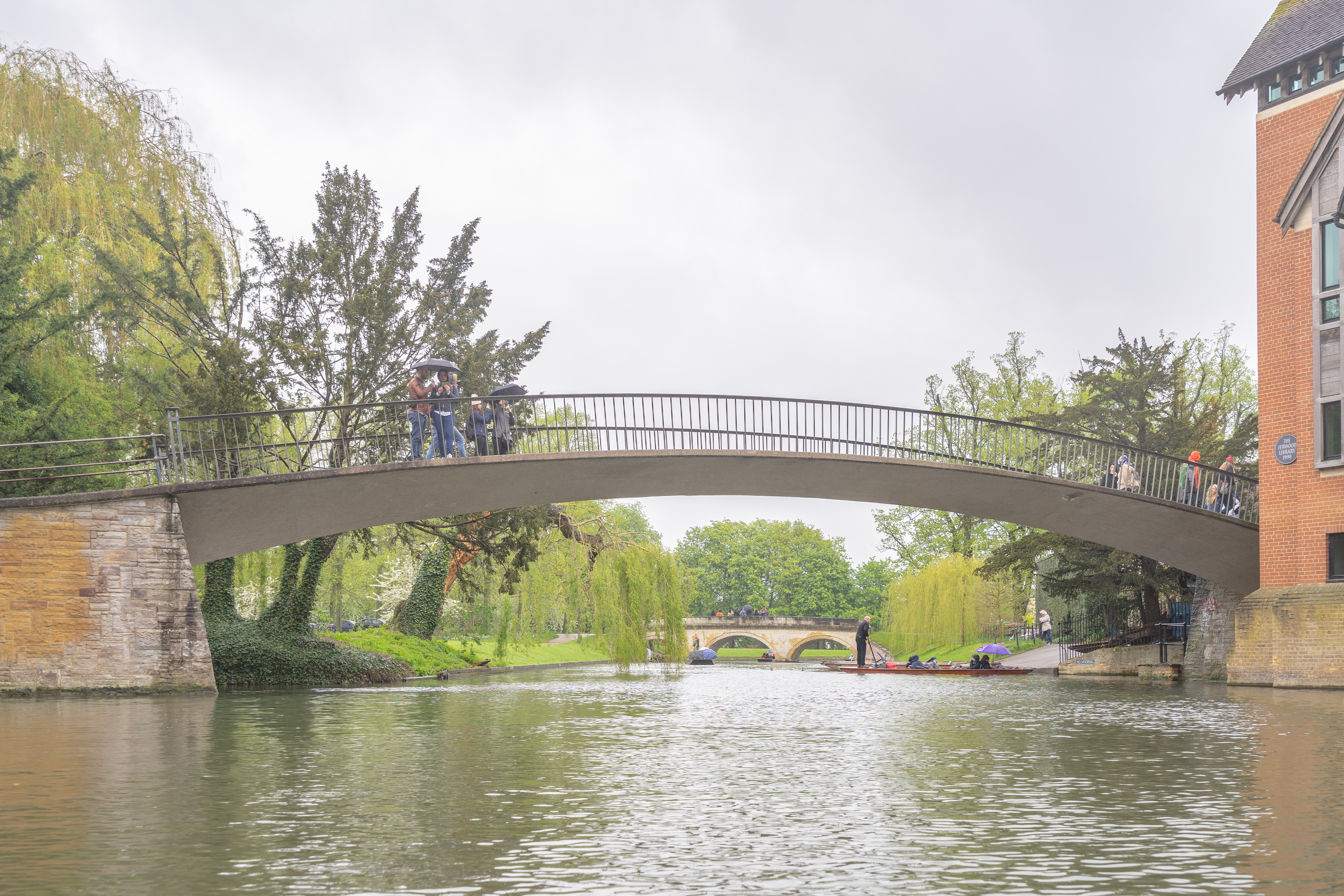
Garret Hostel Bridge

At least the eighth bridge on this site on Garret Hostel Lane between the colleges of Trinity and Trinity Hall. The current design is by Timothy Guy Morgan, who at the time was an undergraduate student at Jesus College, after an open competition. Morgan died in 1960, before the bridge was completed. It was one of the first post-tensioned concrete bridges in the country.^{map 9} Known to students locally as “orgasm bridge”.

==== Trinity College Bridge (1764) ====
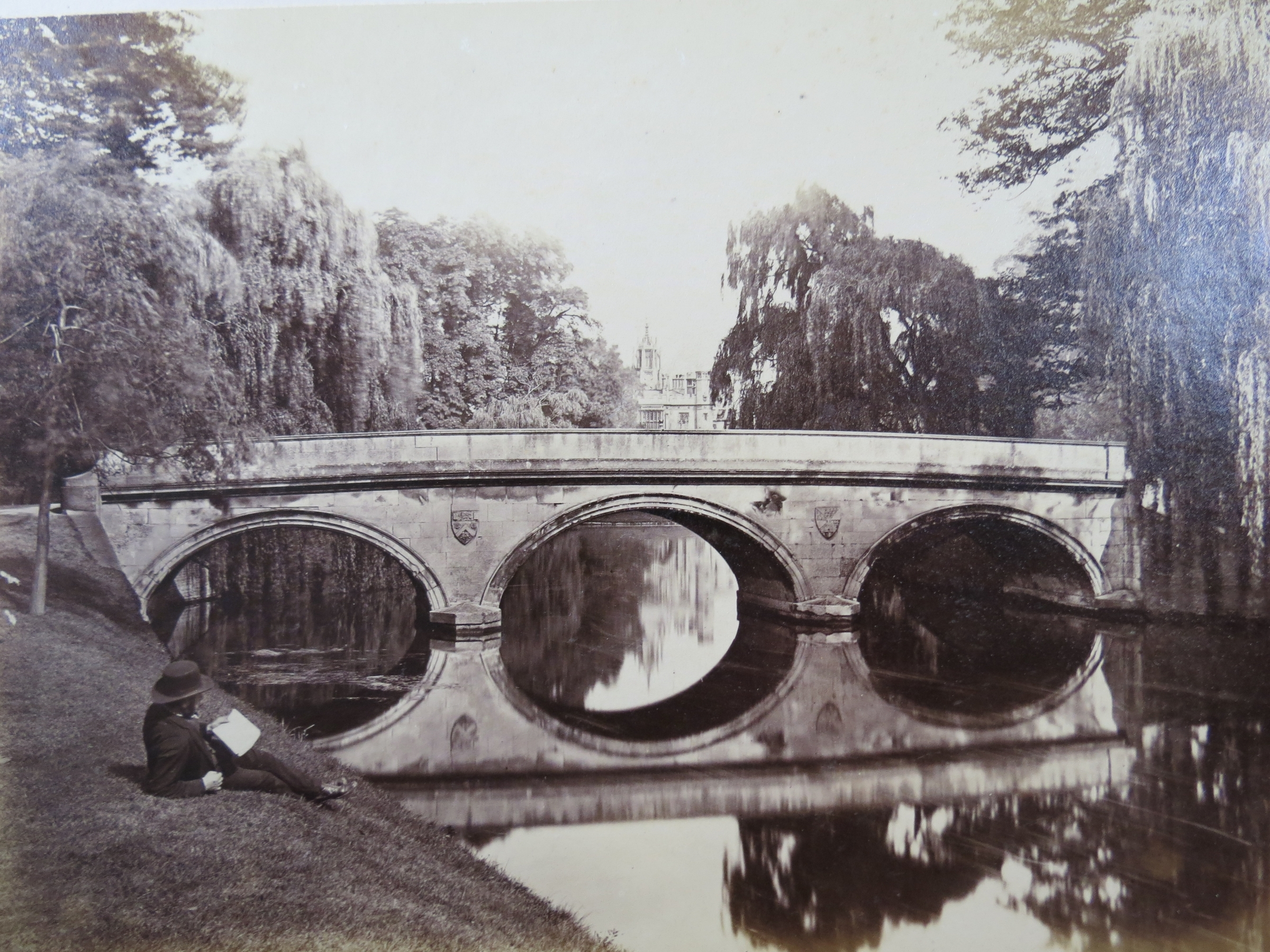
Trinity College Bridge

Designed by James Essex, it replaced a stone bridge built in 1651, which in turn replaced a stone bridge pulled down in 1643 by Cromwellian soldiers as a defence during the English Civil War.^{map 10} It is a Grade I listed building.

==== Kitchen Bridge, St John's College (1709–11) ====
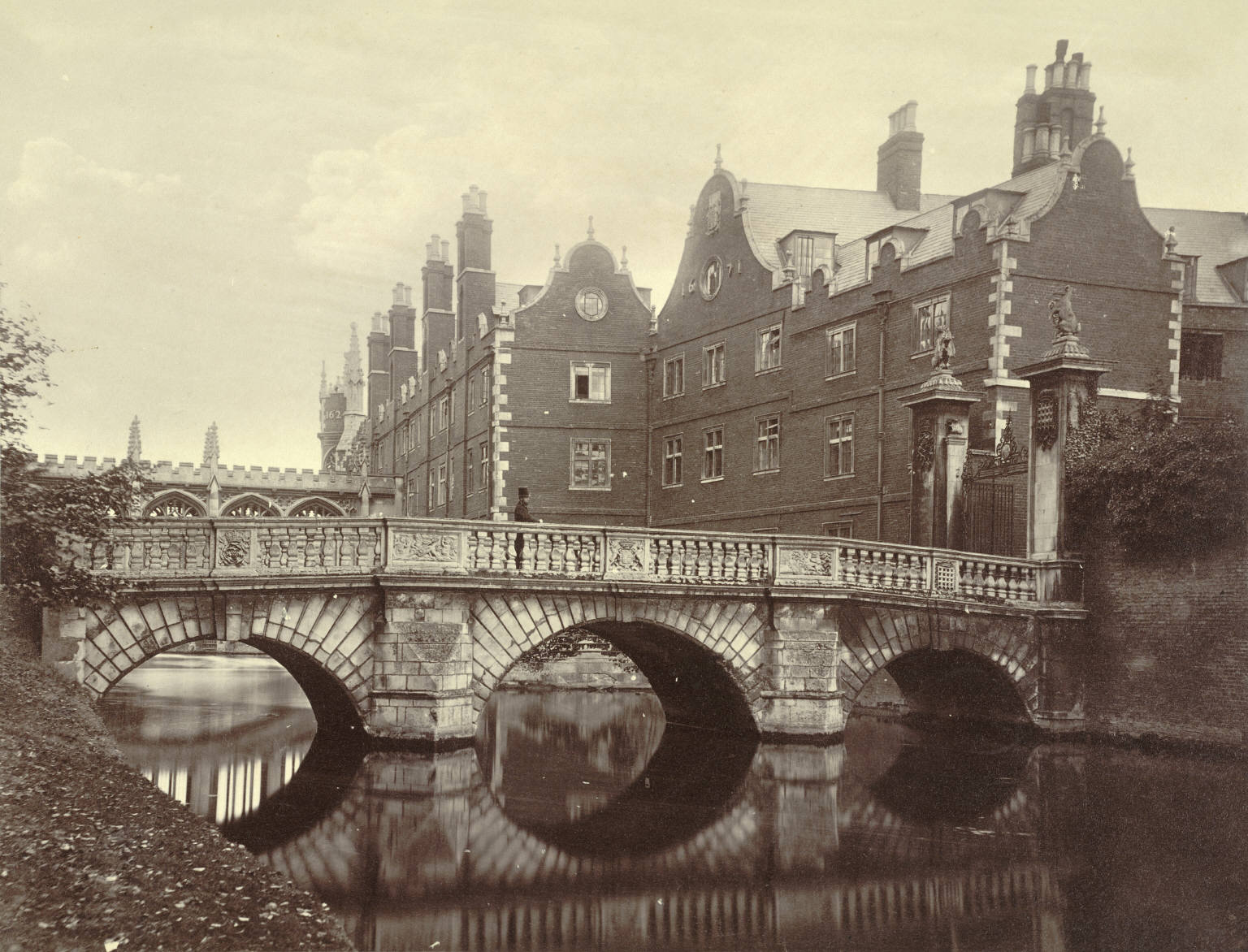
Kitchen Bridge, St John's College

Also known as St John's Old Bridge. The second oldest of Cambridge's remaining bridges, built by Robert Grumbold (1639–1720) according to designs by Sir Christopher Wren. The bridge was crafted from a single block of limestone, carved to give the appearance of masonry. ^{map 11}

==== Bridge of Sighs, St John's College (1831) ====
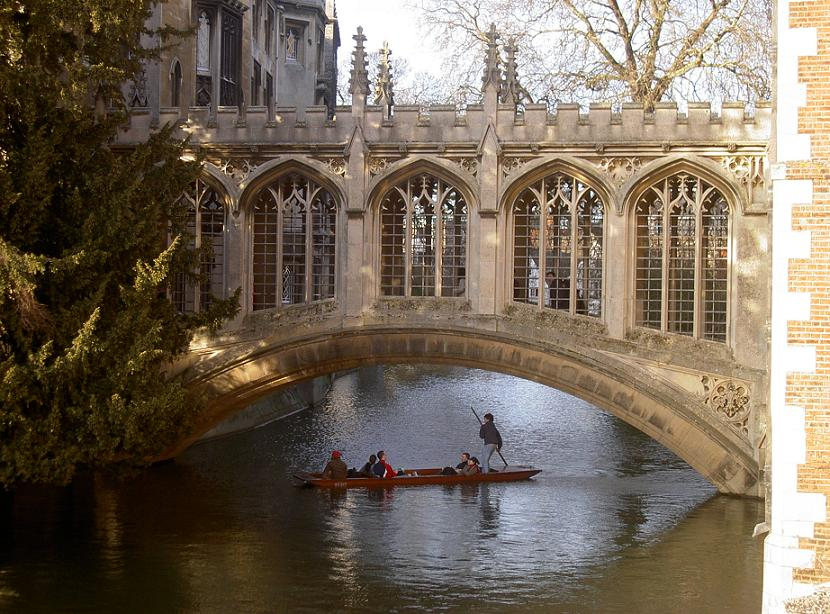
Bridge of Sighs, St John's College

Also known as New Court Bridge, it is probably Cambridge's best-known bridge, designed by Henry Hutchinson and based on a similarly named bridge in Venice, although the only real similarity between them is that they are both covered bridges over waterways.^{map 12}. (A bridge in Oxford, also nicknamed "The Bridge of Sighs" but more reminiscent of the Rialto Bridge, links two sites of Hertford College, but it bridges New College Lane rather than a waterway.)

==== Magdalene Bridge (1823) ====
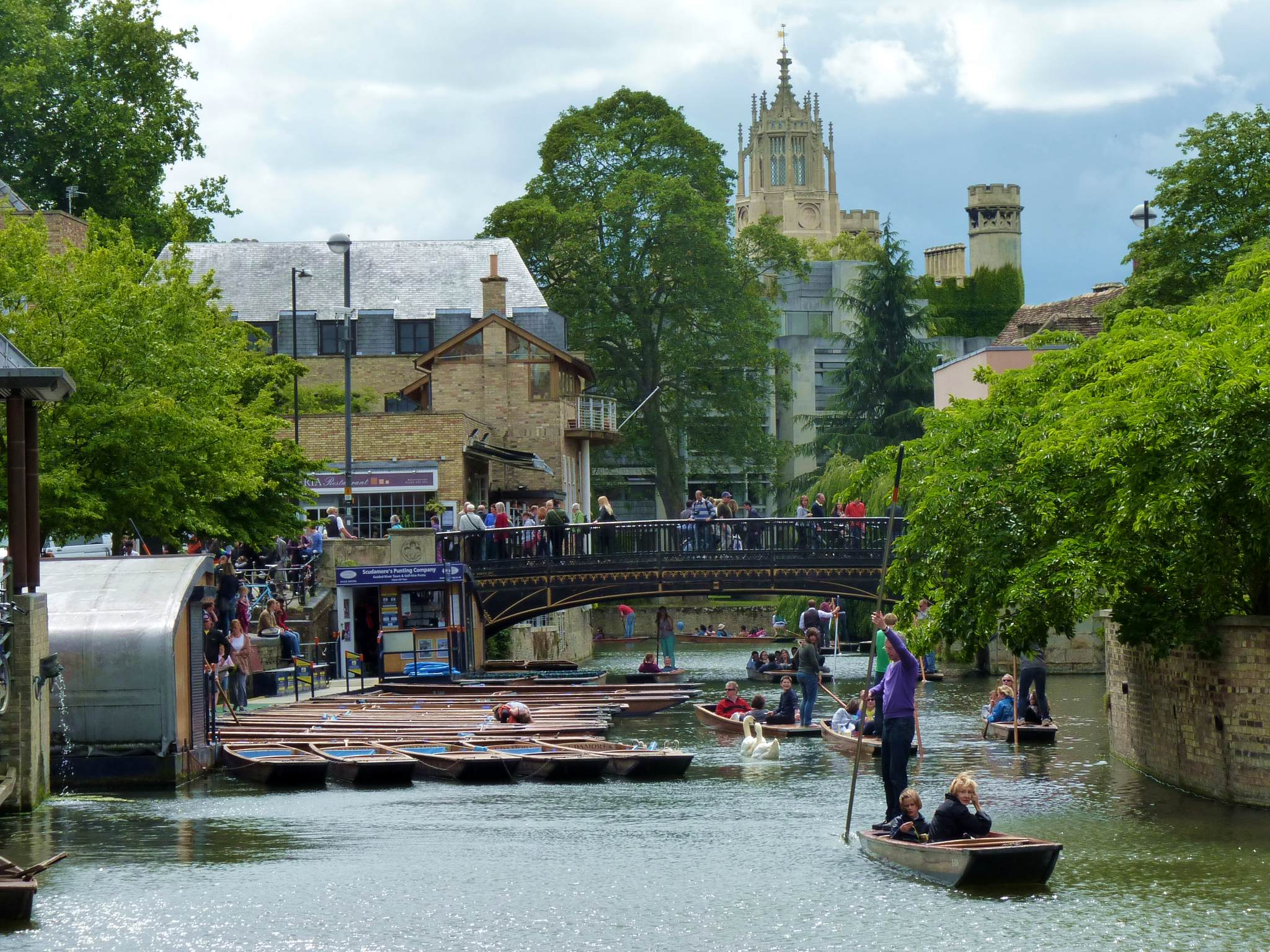
Magdalene Bridge viewed from the boardwalk near Quayside, with the tower of St John's College New Court in the background

Named after Magdalene College, which stands nearby. It is very close to the location of the Roman ford (around 50 AD), and the location of the first Roman bridge in Cambridge (probably re-built by Offa in the 8th century).^{map 13} The current bridge was designed by Arthur Browne in Gothic revival style and was rebuilt in the same style in 1982.

=== Lower River (downstream of Jesus Green weir) ===
==== Jesus Lock footbridge (1892) ====
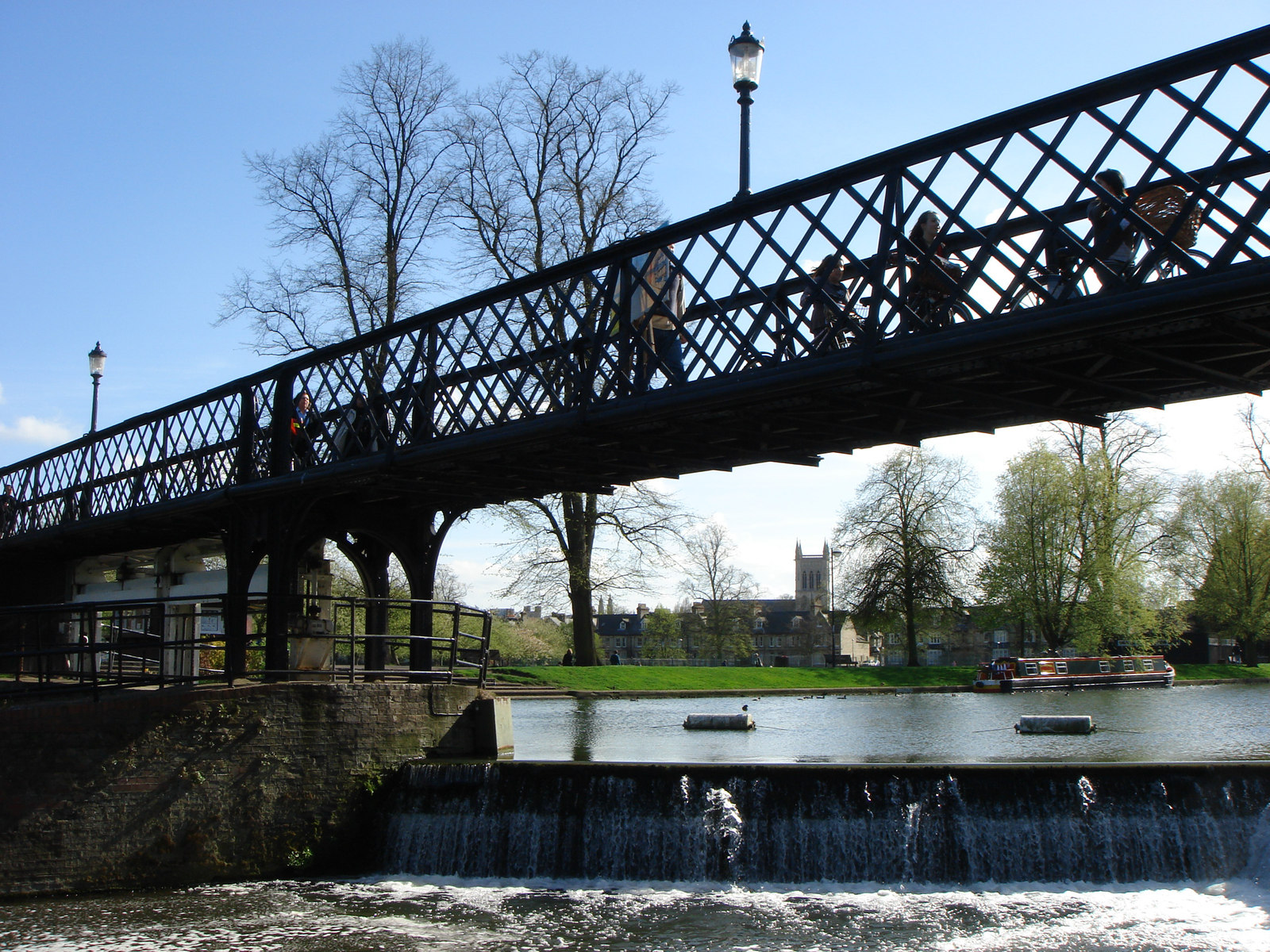
Jesus Lock footbridge

An iron bridge over the weir that divides the 'Middle River' from the 'Lower River', where punting gives way to rowing.^{map 14}

==== Victoria Bridge (1890) ====
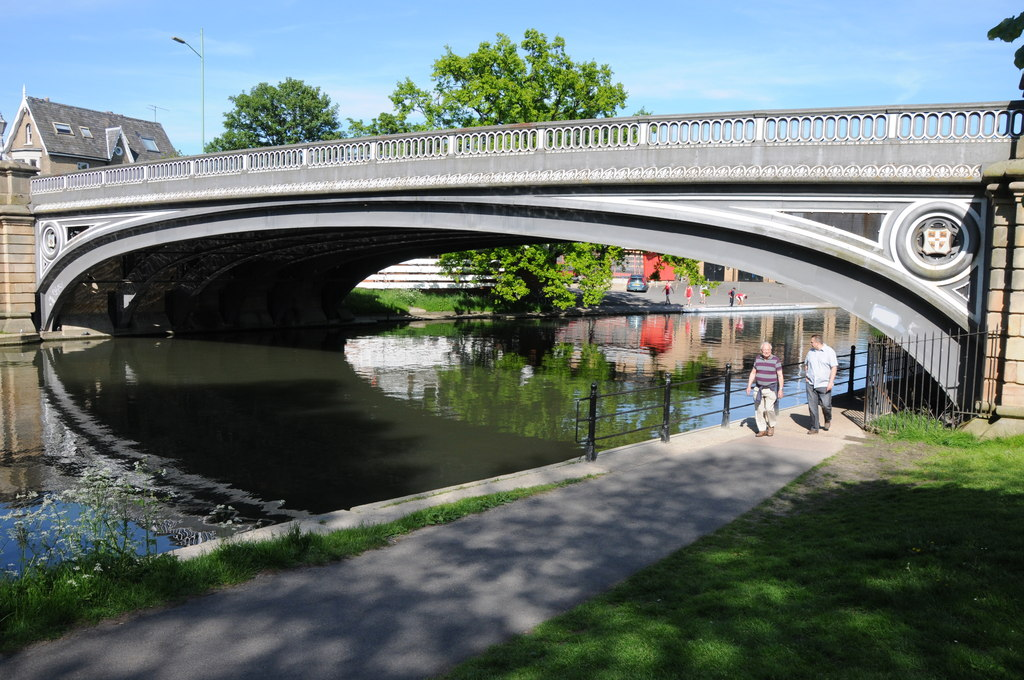
Victoria Bridge

Allowed the residents of Chesterton easy access to the city for the first time. The foundation stone was laid by Frederic Wace, mayor of Cambridge, on 4 November 1889 and the bridge was officially opened by Wace on 11 December 1890. The bridge was rebuilt for strengthening in 1992.^{map 15}

==== Fort St George footbridge, Midsummer Common (1927) ====
Named after the Fort St George pub near its southern end, the site was previously home to a ferry that was "probably the busiest of all the river crossings, running from 8 a.m. to 10 p.m". The bridge was built in 1927, and is now open for use by cyclists.^{map 16}

==== Cutter Ferry Bridge (2005) ====
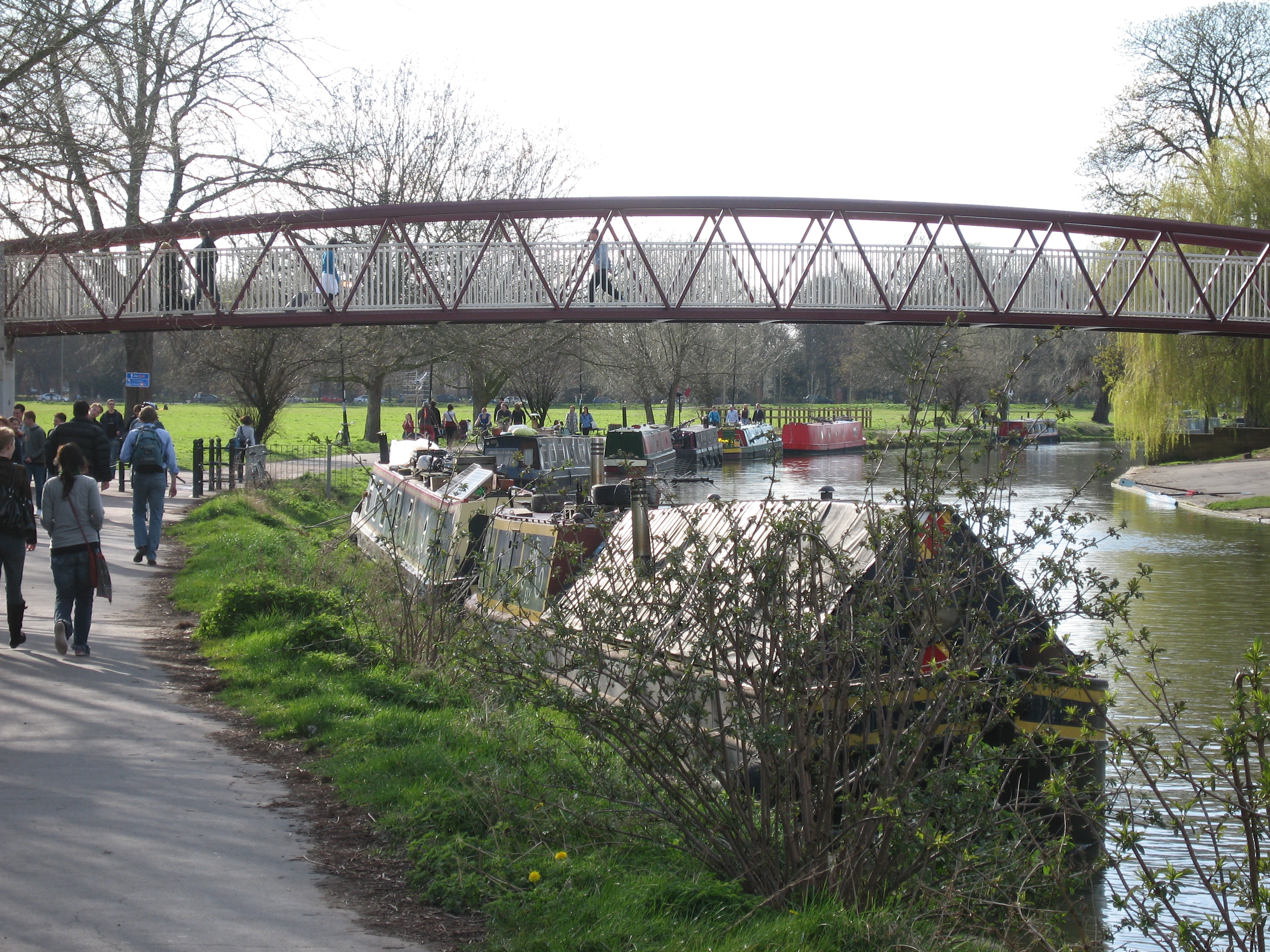
Cutter Ferry Bridge

A pedestrian and cycle bridge that links Cutter Ferry Lane with Midsummer Common. The original footbridge was closed in 2003 after over 75 years of service, and removed during December 2004. The replacement, over which cyclists may legally cycle, was opened on 20 May 2005.^{map 17} Also known by Cambridge residents as Pye's Bridge because of the one-time nearby Pye electronics factory, and by student rowers as Emma Bridge because of its proximity to Emmanuel College Boathouse.

==== Elizabeth Way Bridge (1971) ====
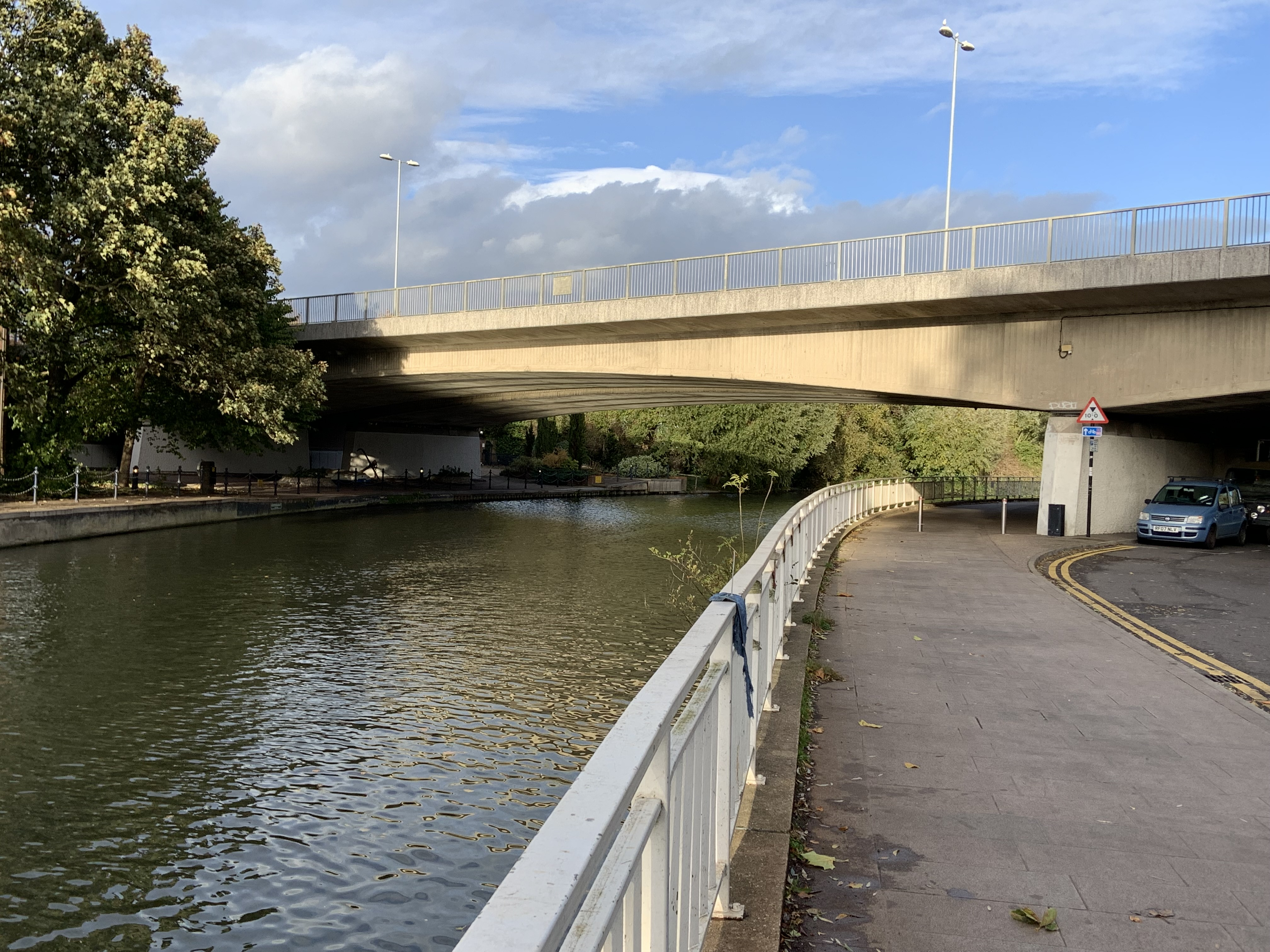
Elizabeth Way Bridge

A plain four-lane concrete road bridge, opened by Lord Butler in his capacity as High Steward of Cambridge on 13 July 1971, this is Cambridge's most recent road bridge. The opening caused a few minutes of embarrassment when Lord Butler's golden scissors failed to cut the ribbon across the road.^{map 18} The bridge forms part of Elizabeth Way (A1134).

==== Equiano Bridge (formerly Riverside Bridge) (2008) ====
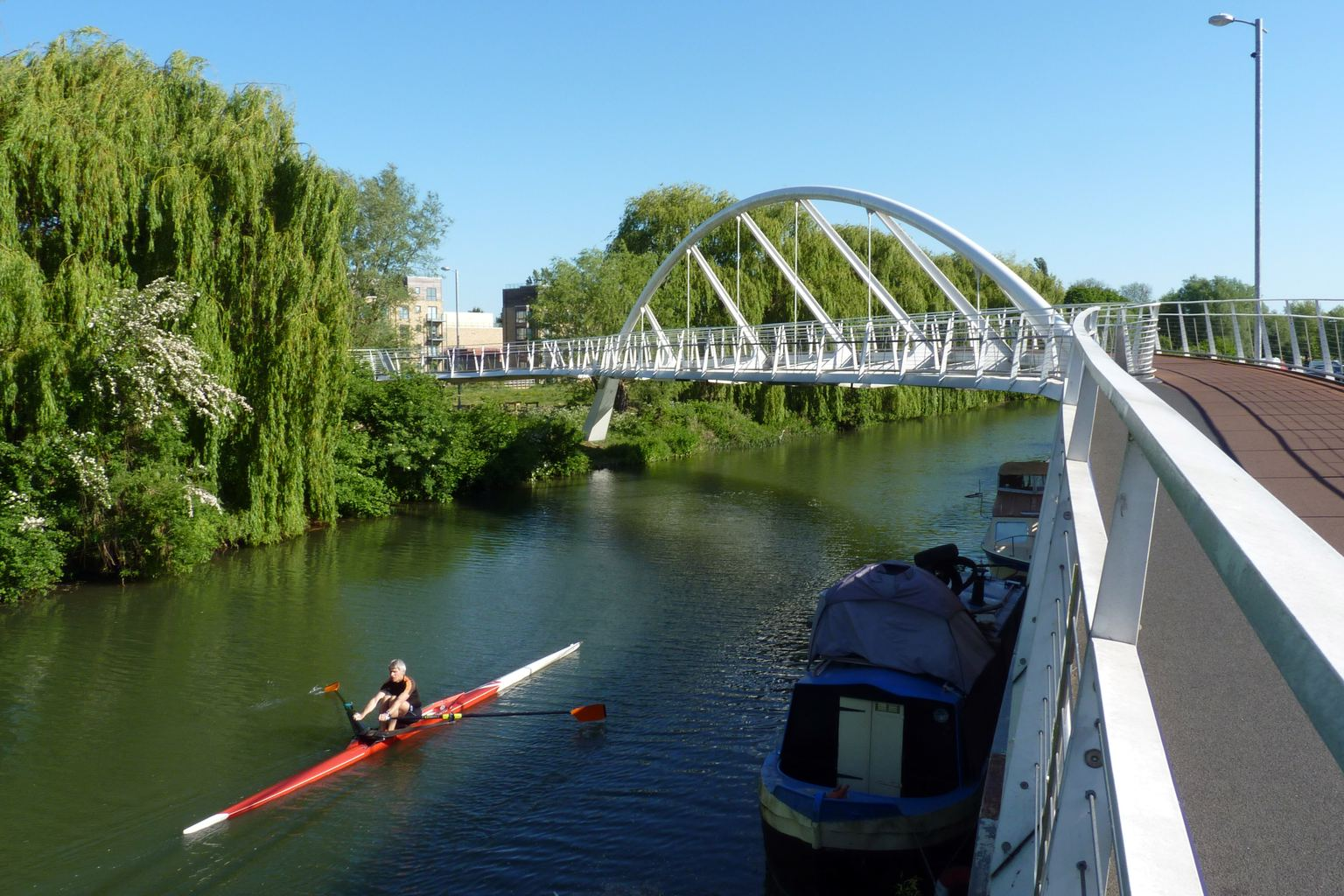
Equiano Bridge

This foot and cycle bridge connects Chesterton and Riverside near the Museum of Technology. Construction work began in April 2007, and the bridge opened to the public on 5 June 2008. It cost £3.1 million and was partially funded by Tesco to provide increased access to its Newmarket Road store. On 31 October 2022 it was renamed to honour writer and abolitionist Olaudah Equiano who had links to the Cambridge area. ^{map 18a} Days afterwards, the northern bank of the bridge became the scene of the first London drugs gang related homicide in Cambridge, with one of the perpetrators being described in court as a victim of modern slavery.

==== Green Dragon bridge, Stourbridge Common (1935) ====
Named after the Green Dragon pub opposite its northern end, the iron-arch bridge was built in 1935, causing the closure of the nearby Horse Grind and Pike & Eel ferries. Also known to student rowers as 'Chesterton Footbridge' as it crosses over what they know as 'Chesterton Corner'.^{map 19}

==== Railway Bridge ====
Crosses the river through east Chesterton, south of the A14 bridge. It is the third railway bridge to be built on this site, replacing a plain plate girder bridge which stood on the site between 1870 and 1930, which itself replaced a wooden bridge built in 1846.^{map 20}

==== Abbey-Chesterton Bridge (2021) ====
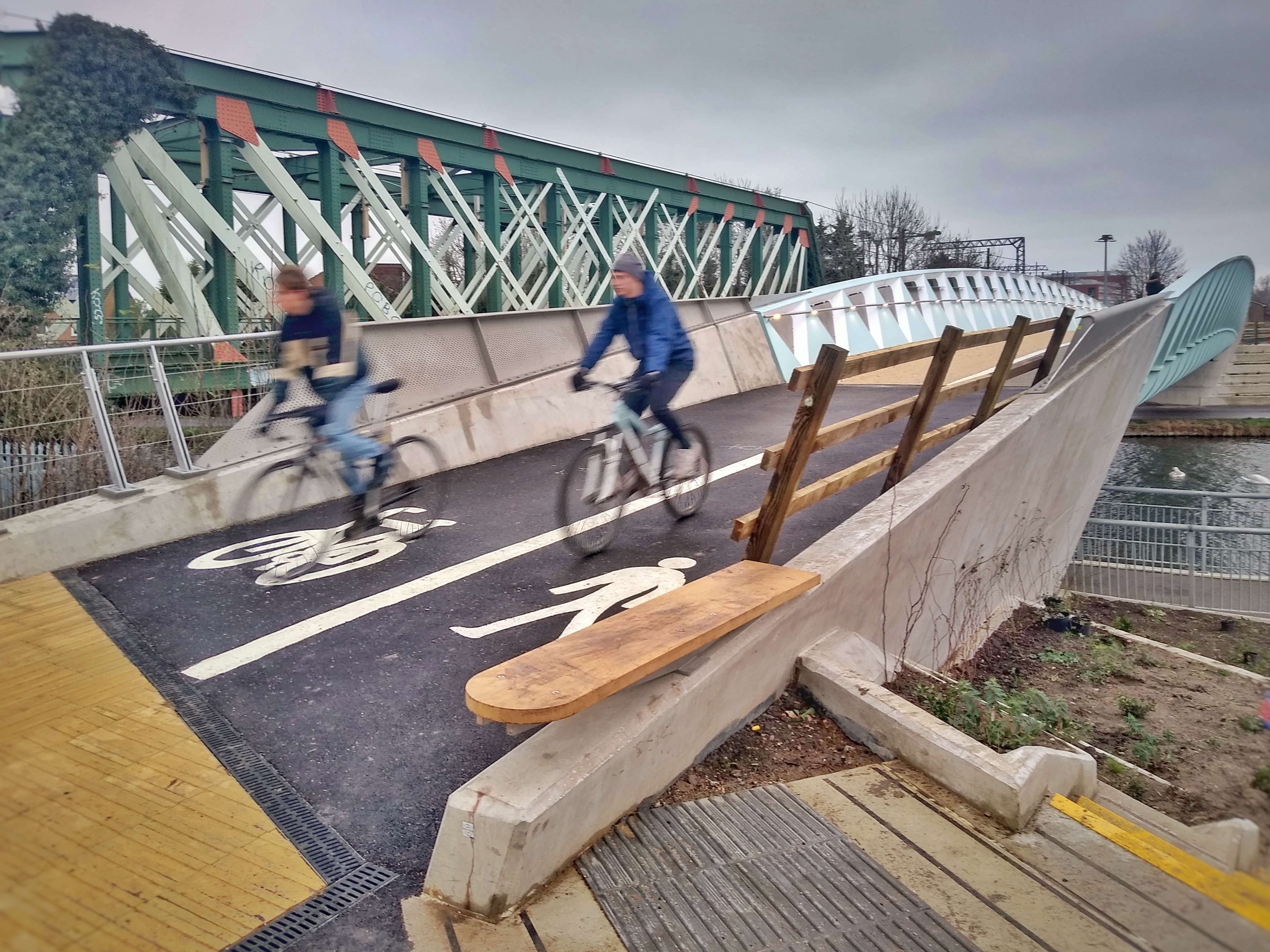
The Abbey-Chesterton foot and cycle bridge in front of the railway bridge

The Abbey-Chesterton Bridge was installed on 8 November 2020 at Ditton Meadows, immediately downstream (east) of the railway girder bridge. This bridge carries the Chisholm Trail over the River Cam. Estimated cost is £4.5 million. The Abbey-Chesterton Bridge was opened by Jim Chisholm at 13:30 on 23 December 2021. ^{map 20a}

==== A14 Bridge ====
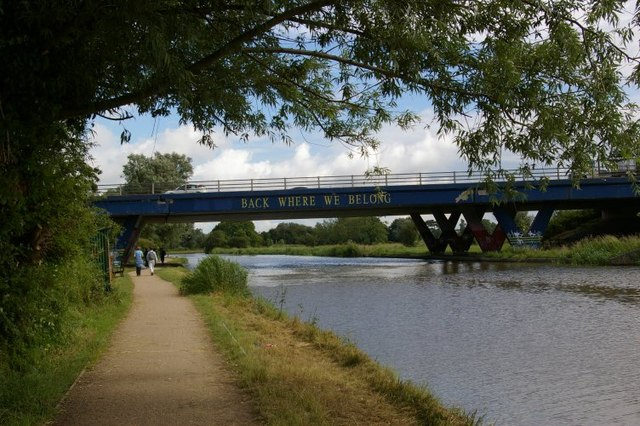
A14 Bridge

Known (incorrectly) to rowers and others as the "Motorway Bridge". Built as part of the 'Cambridge northern bypass', which opened in 1977, the bridge crosses the river just south of Baits Bite Lock. This bridge is also sometimes referred to as “Bovis Bridge” or "Newnham Bridge".^{map 21}

==== Footbridge over the weir, Baits Bite Lock ====
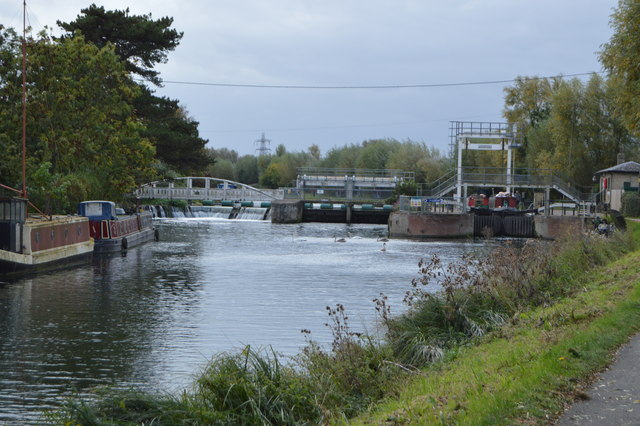
Baits Bite Lock footbridges

An elevated footbridge crosses Baits Bite Lock in Milton to a narrow islet. A concrete-arch footbridge then crosses the weir to the east bank near Horningsea.^{map 22}

== Other bridges ==
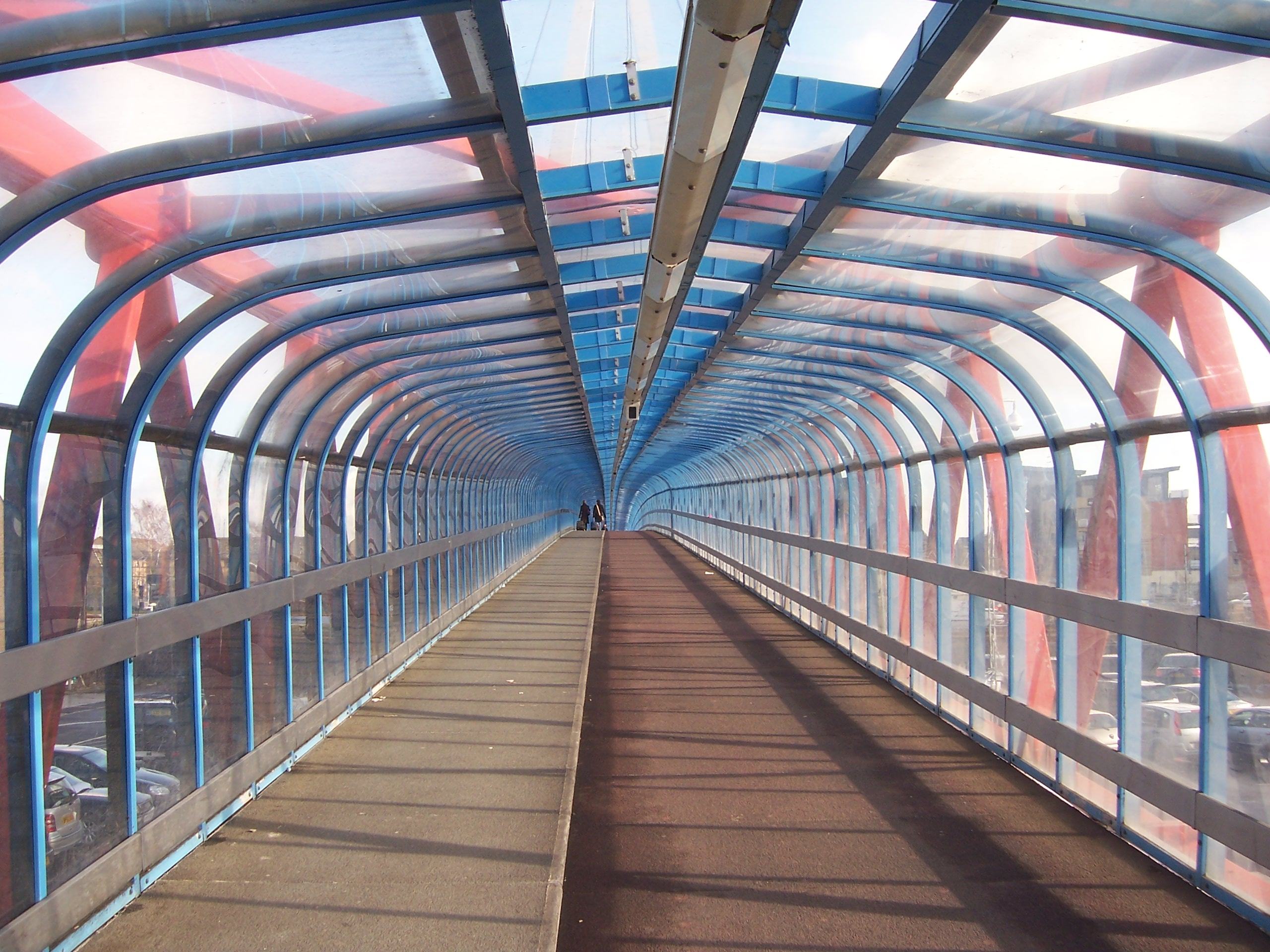
Deck of Tony Carter cycle bridge over railway

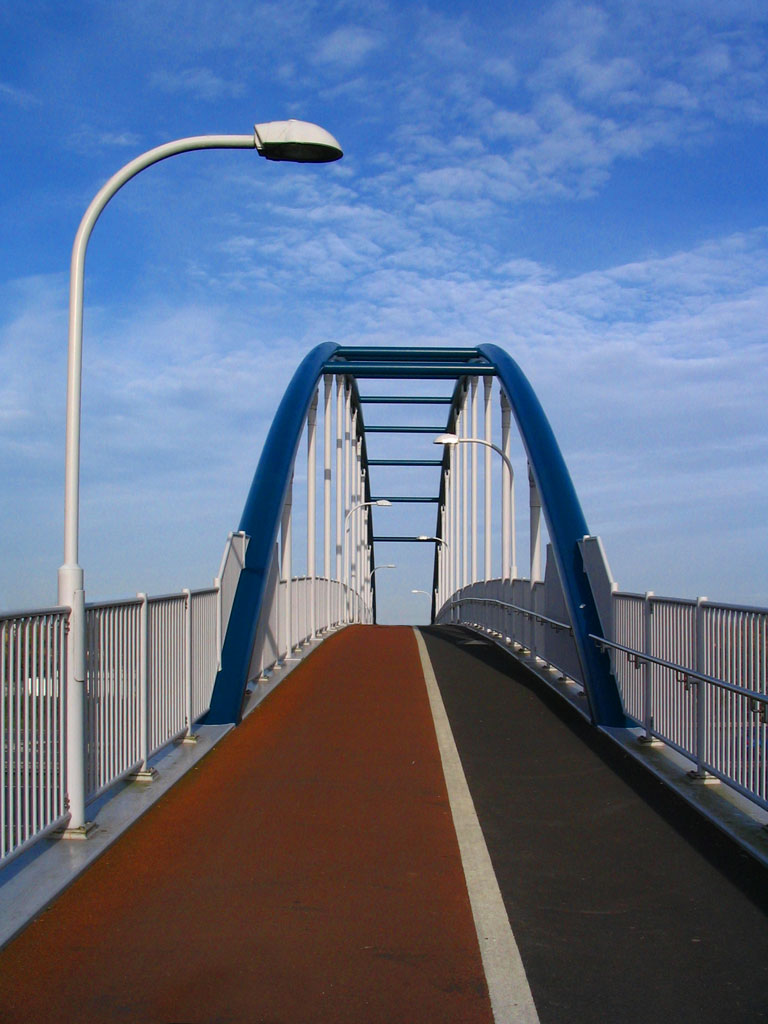
Deck of Jane Coston cycle bridge between Milton and Cambridge

- The Tony Carter bridge is a covered cycle bridge over the railway just north of Cambridge railway station opened in 1989. It was listed at the time in the Guinness Book of Records as the world's longest covered cycle bridge. It is named after a Labour councillor of the era.^{map 23}
- The Jane Coston bridge was opened over the A14 in 2004, allowing cyclists and pedestrians to cross from Cowley Road to Milton. It has a central span of 77 m (253 ft).^{map 24}. Jane Coston is a councillor who campaigned for 8 years for the bridge to be built.
- Coldham's Lane bridge is a cycle and pedestrian bridge over the railway on the south side of Coldham's Lane. It is not a particularly effective route for cyclists, especially those travelling south east.^{map 25}
- The Newmarket Road Bridge,^{map 26} the Mill Road Bridge^{map 27} near Cambridge Station, the Hills Road Bridge^{map 28} and the Long Road Bridge are other bridges over the railway.^{map 29}
- Cambridgeshire Guided Busway: A14 bridge, Hills Road Bridge, Long Road Bridge, Shelford Road Bridge and Hauxton Road Bridge on former railway lines, plus a new Addenbrooke's Bridge leading over the railway line to the hospital.

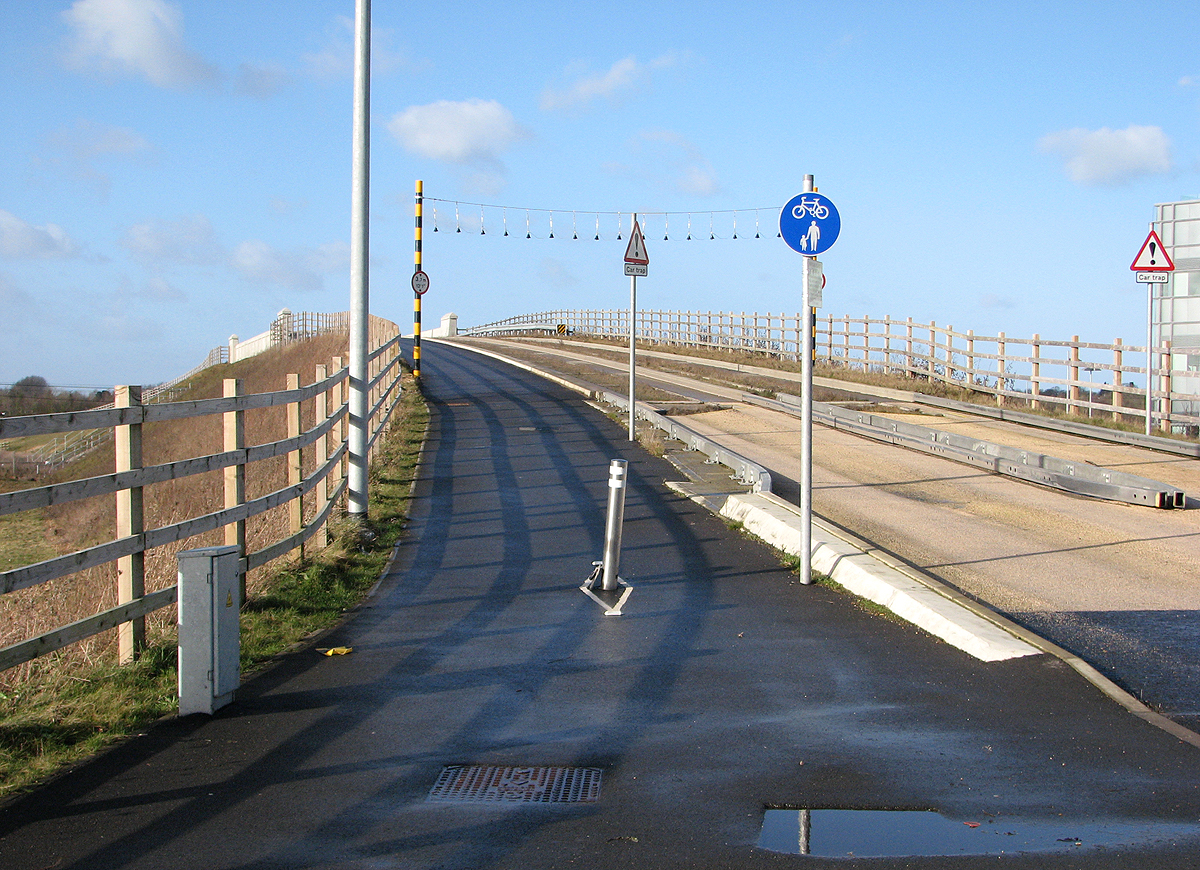
Approach to Cambridgeshire Guided Busway bridge at Addenbrooke's

== See also ==
- List of bridges in the United Kingdom

== Mapping ==
- Footbridge, Coe Fen, 52°11′42.95″N 000°06′58.85″E
- Fen Causeway Bridge, 52°11′50.76″N 000°07′06.15″E
- Crusoe Bridge, 52°11′53.55″N 000°07′03.95″E
- Darwin College Bridges, 52°12′02.83″N 000°06′51.72″E
- Silver Street Bridge, 52°12′06.77″N 000°06′55.27″E
- Mathematical Bridge, 52°12′07.87″N 000°06′54.15″E
- King's College Bridge, 52°12′13.55″N 000°06′50.78″E
- Clare College Bridge, 52°12′17.96″N 000°06′50.77″E
- Garret Hostel Bridge, 52°12′21.02″N 000°06′50.34″E
- Trinity College Bridge, 52°12′23.94″N 000°06′49.97″E
- Kitchen Bridge, 52°12′29.00″N 000°06′56.31″E
- Bridge of Sighs, 52°12′30.33″N 000°06′56.76″E
- Magdalene Bridge, 52°12′35.43″N 000°06′59.52″E
- Jesus Lock footbridge, 52°12′46.28″N 000°07′14.30″E
- Victoria Avenue Bridge, 52°12′47.98″N 000°07′32.53″E
- Footbridge, Midsummer Common, 52°12′44.65″N 000°07′42.25″E
- Cutter Ferry Bridge, 52°12′37.41″N 000°08′03.81″E
- Elizabeth Way Bridge, 52°12′40.03″N 000°08′12.24″E
- Equiano Bridge, 52°12′48″N 000°08′34.25″E
- Footbridge, Stourbridge Common, 52°13′02.72″N 000°08′45.35″E
- Railway Bridge, 52°13′12.84″N 000°09′23.15″E
- Abbey-Chesterton Bridge, 52°13′12.828″N 000°9′24.3354″E
- A14 Bridge, 52°13′56.56″N 000°10′16.27″E
- Footbridge over the weir, Baits Bite Lock, 52°14′11.03″N 000°10′28.23″E
- Tony Carter bridge, 52°11′45.04″N 000°08′20.94″E
- Jane Coston bridge, 52°14′11.86″N 000°09′21.20″E
- Coldham's Lane bridge, 52°12′25.65″N 000°08′49.65″E
- Newmarket Road Bridge, 52°12′48.86″N 000°09′06.35″E
- Mill Road Bridge, 52°11′55.22″N 000°08′27.56″E
- Hills Road Bridge, 52°11′26.40″N 000°08′06.19″E
- Long Road Bridge, 52°10′46.54″N 000°07′50.45″E
