= Silver Street Bridge =

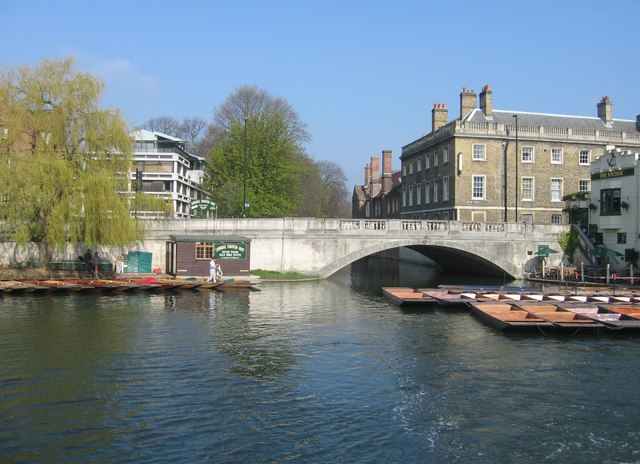
- Coordinates: 52°12′06″N 0°06′55″E
- Crosses: River Cam
- Locale: Silver Street, Cambridge
- Official name: Small Bridge
- Preceded by: Darwin College Bridges
- Followed by: Mathematical Bridge

Characteristics
- Design: vaulted arch bridge
- Material: Reinforced concrete

History
- Designer: Sir Edwin Lutyens
- Construction end: 1959

Silver Street Bridge, officially known as Small Bridge is the sixth river Cam bridge overall and the second bridge on its middle stream in Cambridge. In 1959 the concrete bridge with the design by Sir Edwin Lutyens replaced an 1841 cast iron bridge.

== See also ==
- List of bridges in Cambridge
- Template:River Cam map
