= Fen Causeway, Cambridge =

Link road in United Kingdom

Coordinates: 52.197°N 0.117°E

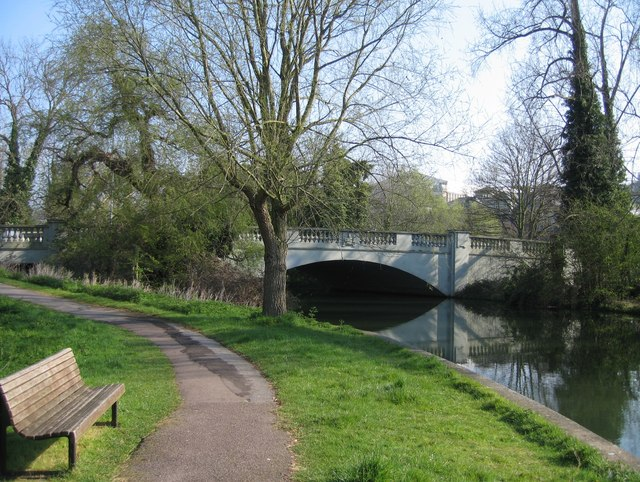
Fen Causeway (not visible) crossing the River Cam via stone bridge.

Fen Causeway is a link road in the city of Cambridge, United Kingdom, constructed in the mid-1920s to ease the pressure on Silver Street. It forms part of the A1134 ring road. It links Newnham Road and Trumpington Road and spans the River Cam with Sheep's Green to the south and Coe Fen to the north. There is little residential development on this road.

As indicated by the road's name, prior to its construction this was a predominantly wild fen area, crossed only by Coe Fen Lane, the predecessor to the current road.
