= Coe Fen =

Meadowland area near Cambridge, England

Coordinates: 52.1975°N 0.1190°E

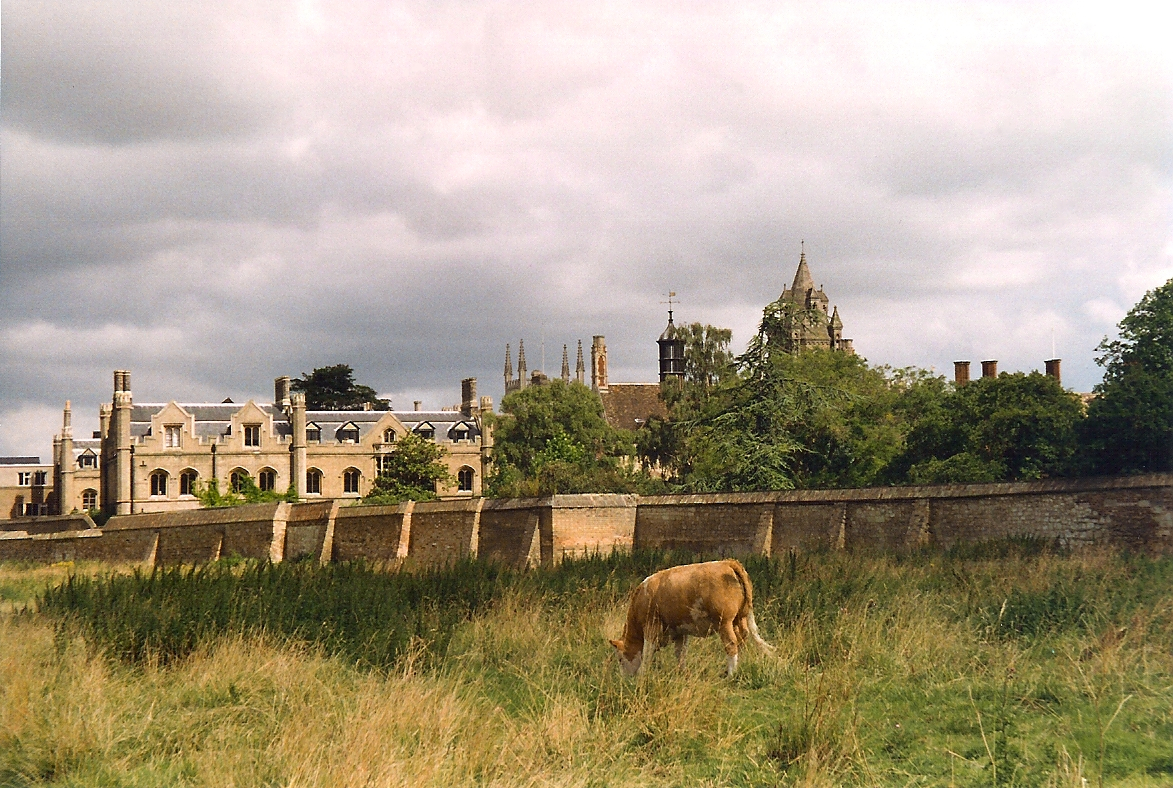
Coe Fen with Peterhouse in the background.

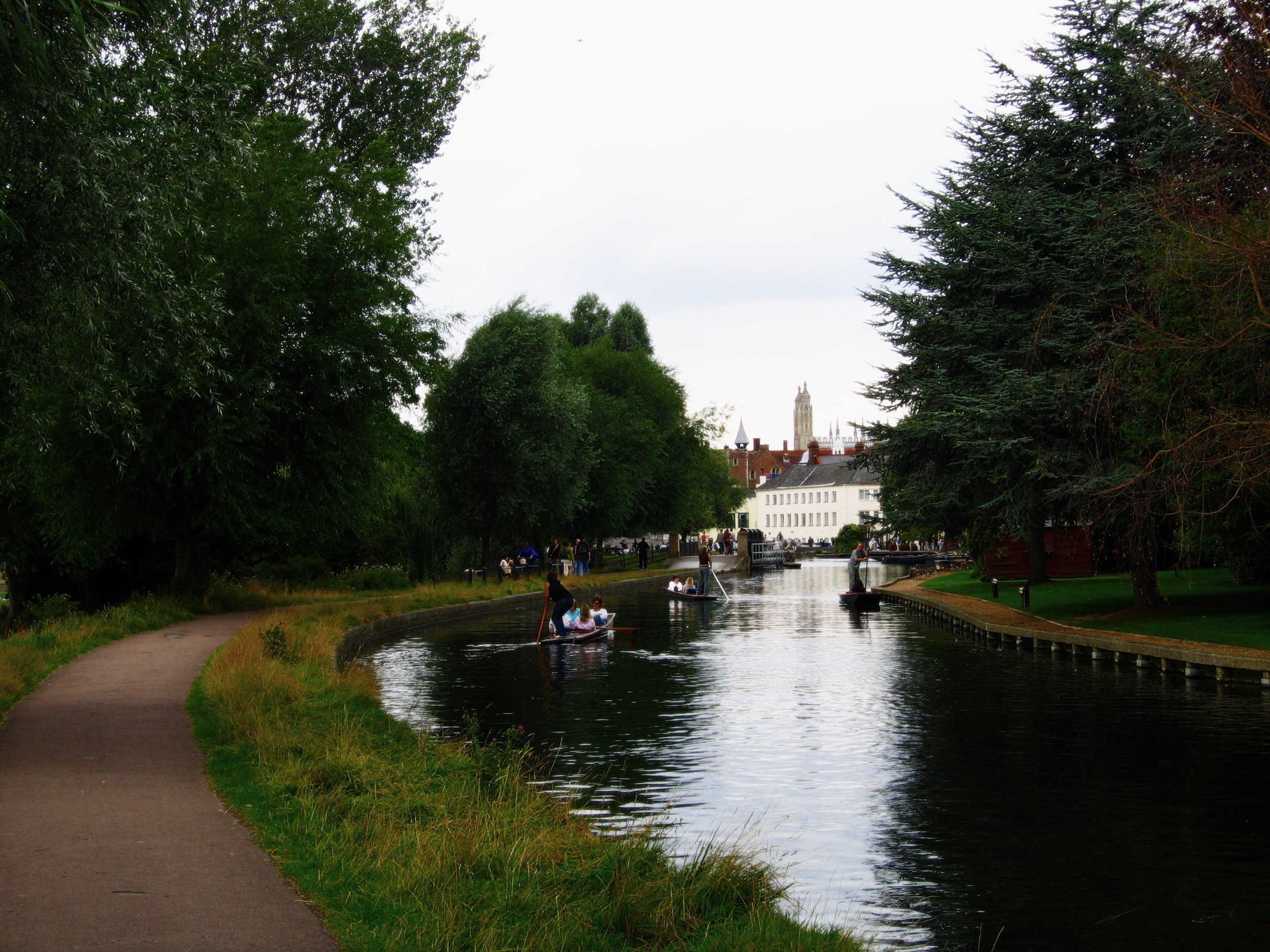
View looking northwards on the River Cam with Sheep's Green on the left. The top of King's College Chapel can be seen in the background.

Coe Fen is a semi-rural meadowland area to the east of the River Cam in the south of the city of Cambridge, England. It lies at the back of Peterhouse (one of the University of Cambridge colleges) to the north, the Fitzwilliam Museum, and The Leys School to the south. The fen is straddled by the Fen Causeway (A1134 road) across the Cam. There is also a footbridge at the back of The Leys School to the south and Crusoe Bridge is just north of the Fen Causeway Bridge.

The area is very bucolic considering its closeness to the centre of Cambridge and the cows which graze the grassland. Walking and cycling is pleasant in the area and in the summer there is punting on the river.

On the opposite (west) side of the river is Sheep's Green, and Sheep's Green and Coe Fen is a Local Nature Reserve.

== History ==
Coe Fen and Sheep's Green form a natural area that was once important for the commercial activity of Cambridge. There were up to three watermills in the area. The land between the artificially raised banks of the watercourses was liable to flooding and thus only suitable for grazing (cows on Coe Fen, sheep on Sheep's Green, hence the names). By the 19th century, the fen had become very boggy and was partially drained to help avoid disease. Today, the land is a semi-natural area.

== Hodson's Folly ==
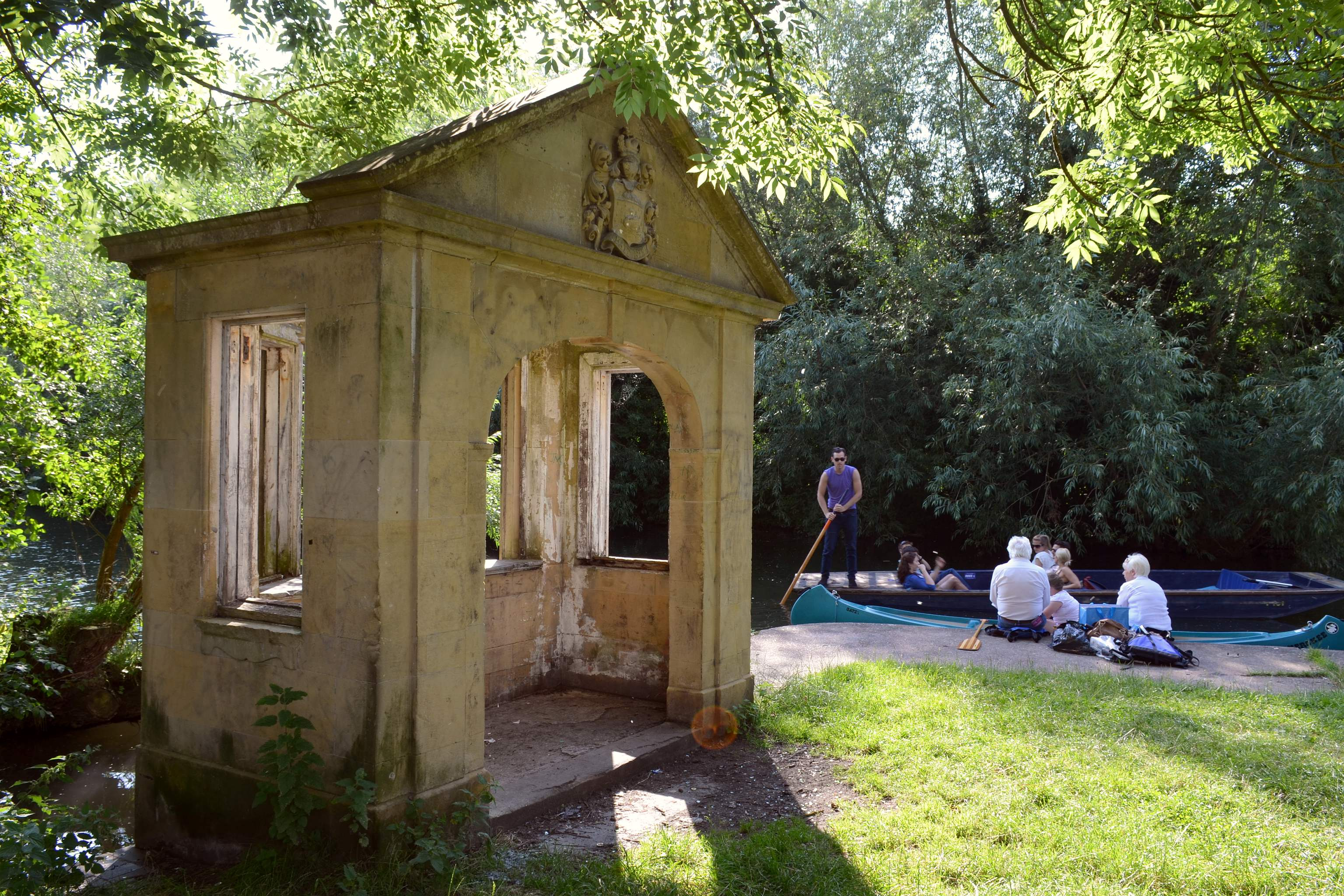
Hodson's Folly in July 2014

Hodson’s Folly is a small stone shelter in the classical style near the bridge between Sheep’s Green and Coe Fen. The summerhouse was built in 1887 by John Hodson, who later became a Pembroke College butler, to keep watch on his daughter when she swam in the river. The site has been in the ownership of Cambridge City Council since 1936. It was attacked by vandals in 2014, prompting a petition to restore it.

In 2013 Cambridge Past Present and Future is working with local people to restore and improve the Hodson's Folly, its boathouse and secret garden.

== Laundress Green ==
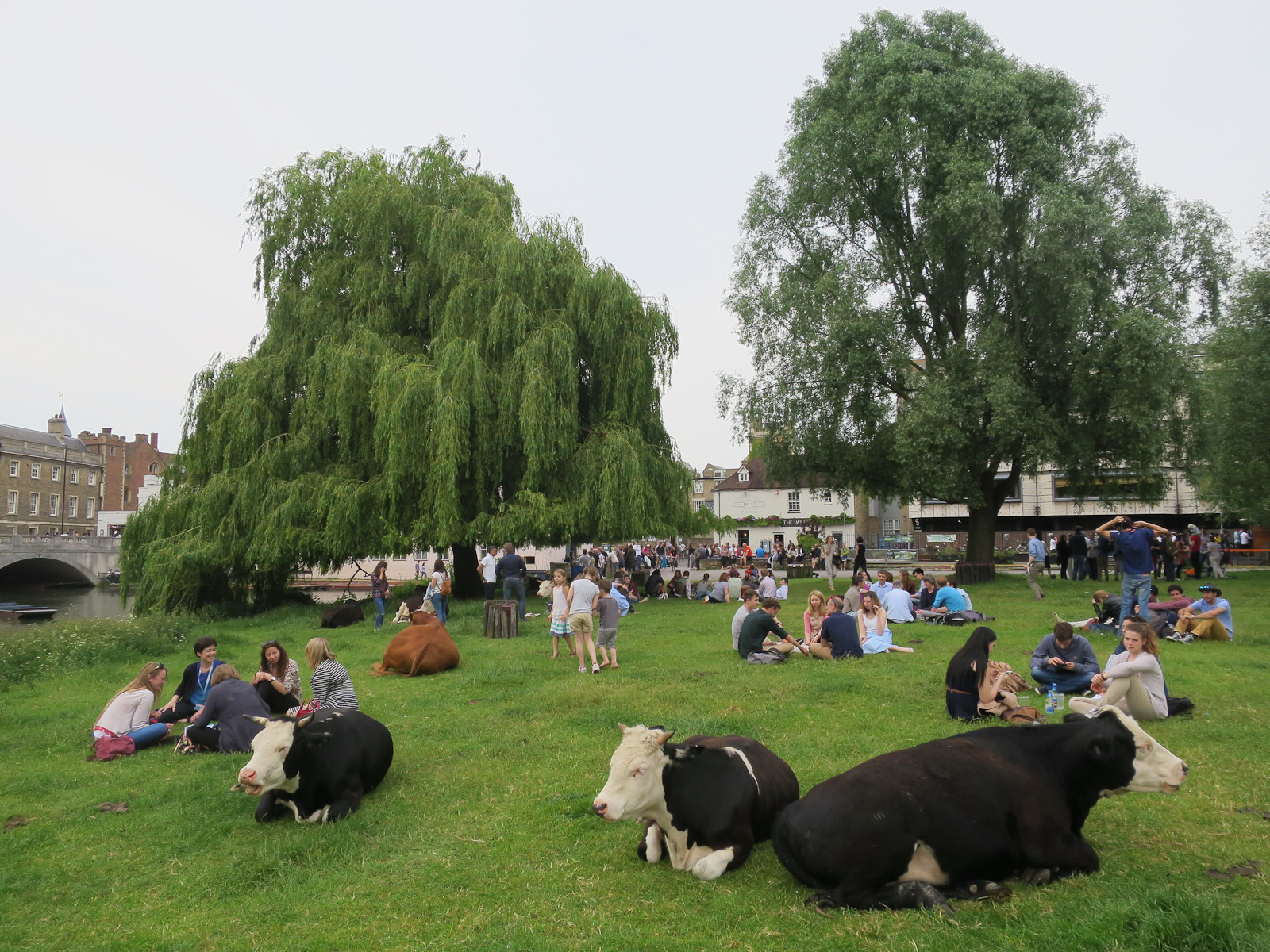
Cattle and picnickers on Laundress Green

The northern end of Coe Fen extends across punt rollers to connect with Mill Lane across a weir. The grassy peninsula is named after the former practice of stretching out laundry there, to dry and bleach in the sun. Owing to its proximity to the pubs The Anchor and The Mill, it is a popular spot for picnics in summer.

== Use of the name ==
Coe Fen is the name of a hymn tune by Ken Naylor, who was music master at The Leys School. It is used for the hymn How shall I sing that majesty?

== See also ==
- List of bridges in Cambridge
