= Magdalene Street =

Street in Cambridge, England

Coordinates: 52.2097°N 0.1166°E

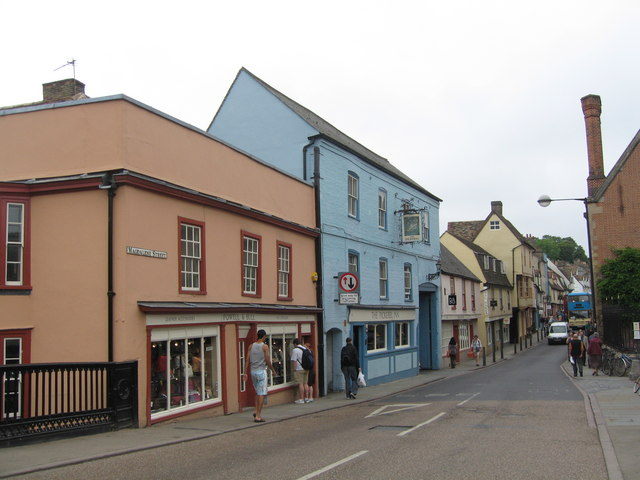
Magdalene Street, looking north from the bridge

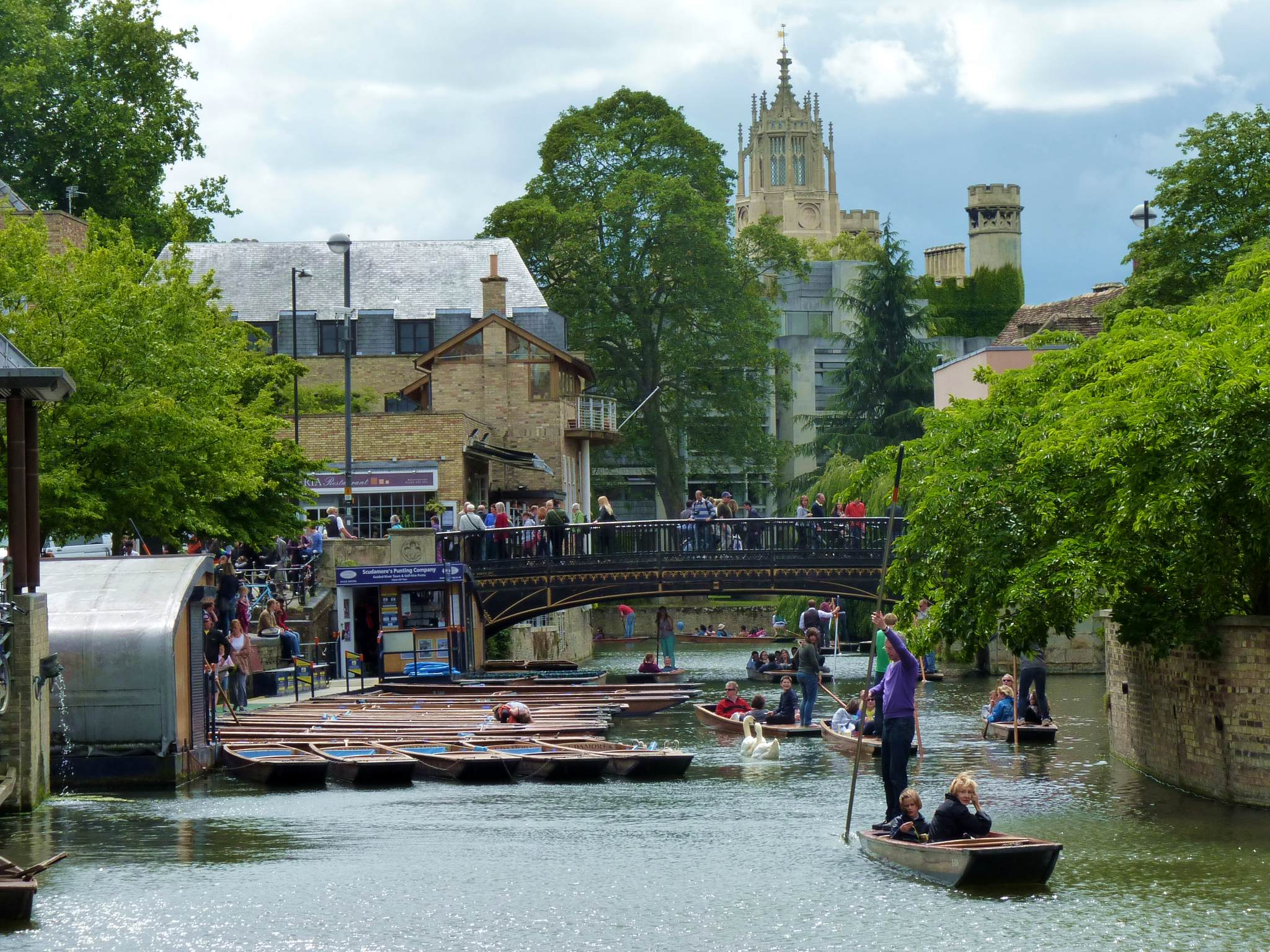
Cambridge Quayside and Magdalene Bridge viewed from the boardwalk, with the tower of St John's College New Court in the background

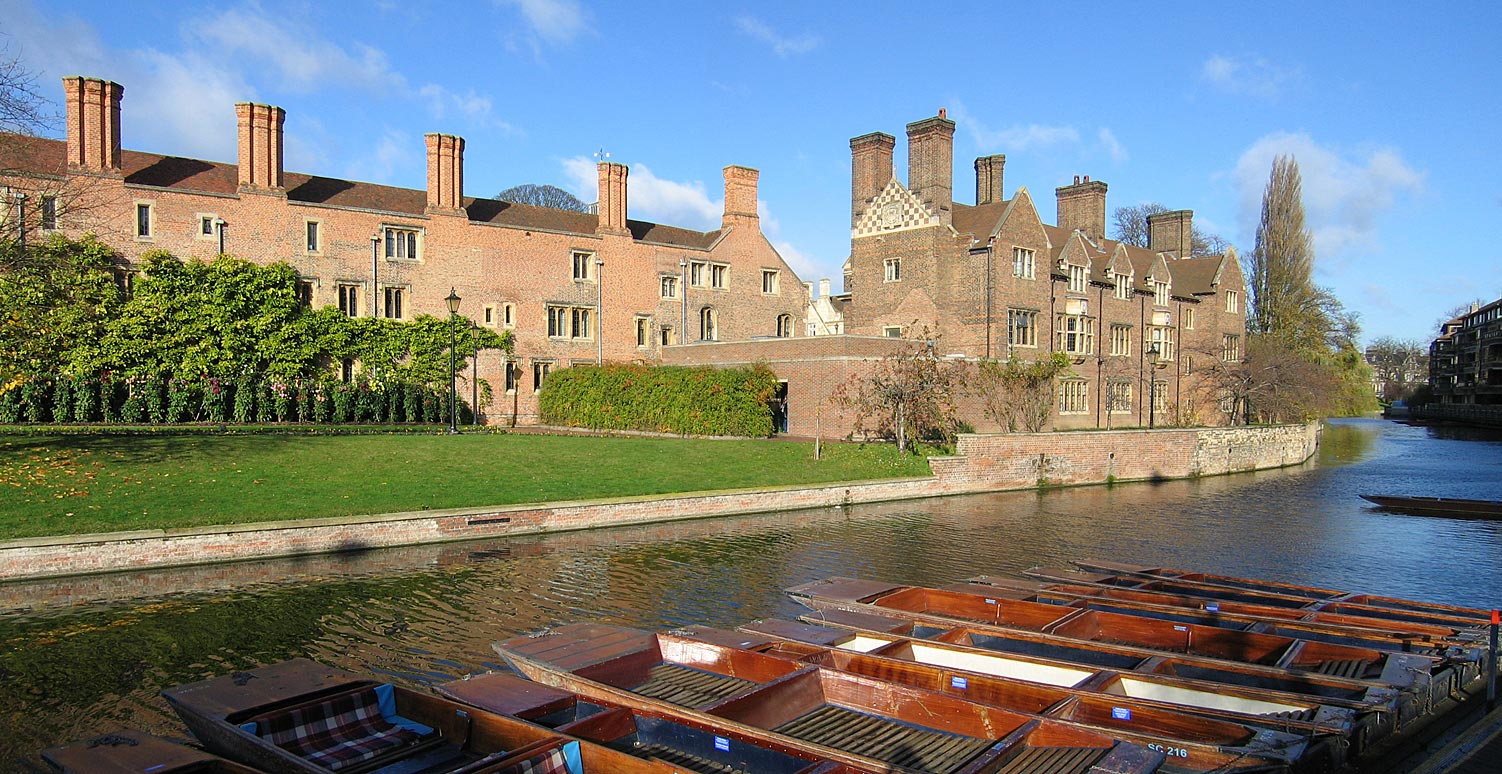
View of Magdalene College, looking across the River Cam just north of Magdalene Street at Magdalene Bridge

Magdalene Street is a street in the north of central Cambridge, England. It runs between Castle Street, by Castle Hill, at the junction with Northampton Street and Chesterton Lane, then Chesterton Road (the A1303), to the northwest and Bridge Street at the junction with Thompson's Lane to the southeast.

The road straddles the River Cam on Magdalene Bridge (built 1823), just south of Magdalene College (hence the name) and just north of St John's College, one of the largest University of Cambridge colleges. Magdalene Bridge or the Great Bridge is on the site of the original bridge that gave 'Cambridge' its name.

== History ==
Magdalene Street used to be the northwestern part of Bridge Street. It developed as the northern approach to the original river crossing for entering Cambridge. The first crossing was as a ford and this was built up as causeways by the Romans. Eventually a bridge was built across the Cam, giving Cambridge its name. The hilltop on the northwest bank helped protect the crossing point and ensured that Cambridge became a major inland port. The area around the river became the site for coaching inns, factories, merchants' houses, and warehouses, making use of the river’s resources and the trade at the crossing point.

When the Fens were drained in the 17th century, the river was no longer tidal. With time, the area became increasingly isolated from the main part of the town, which expanded on the other side of the crossing. The isolation and poverty of the area saved it from redevelopment in Victorian times. Even in the 1930s, Magdalene College was too poor to carry out a plan to demolish the street up to the bridge. Subsequently, with the assistance of the College, the street was preserved as one of the oldest in Cambridge. Some of the buildings date from the 16th century and many are now listed.

== Magdalene Bridge ==
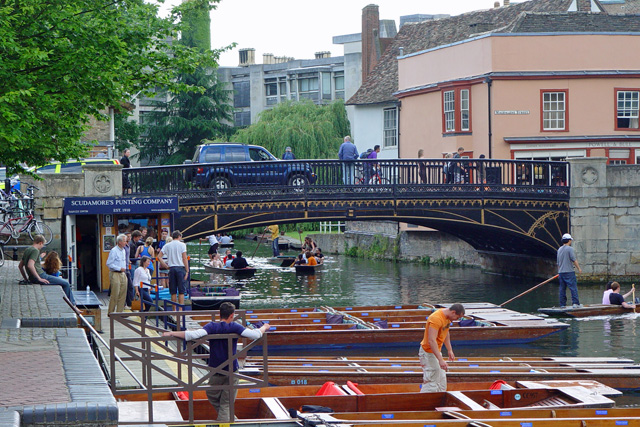
Magdalene Bridge

The current cast-iron Magdalene Bridge or "Great Bridge", dates from 1823 and was designed by Norwich architect Arthur Browne. It is a single span of cast iron surmounted by an iron railing decoration terminating in ashlar piers. It became a Grade II listed building in 1969. It was repaired and strengthened in 1982.

There had been a series of wooden bridges on the site from Anglo-Saxon times until James Essex built the first stone bridge in 1754.

== See also ==
- List of bridges in Cambridge
