= Victoria Bridge, Cambridge, England =

Coordinates: 52°12′48″N 0°07′33″E

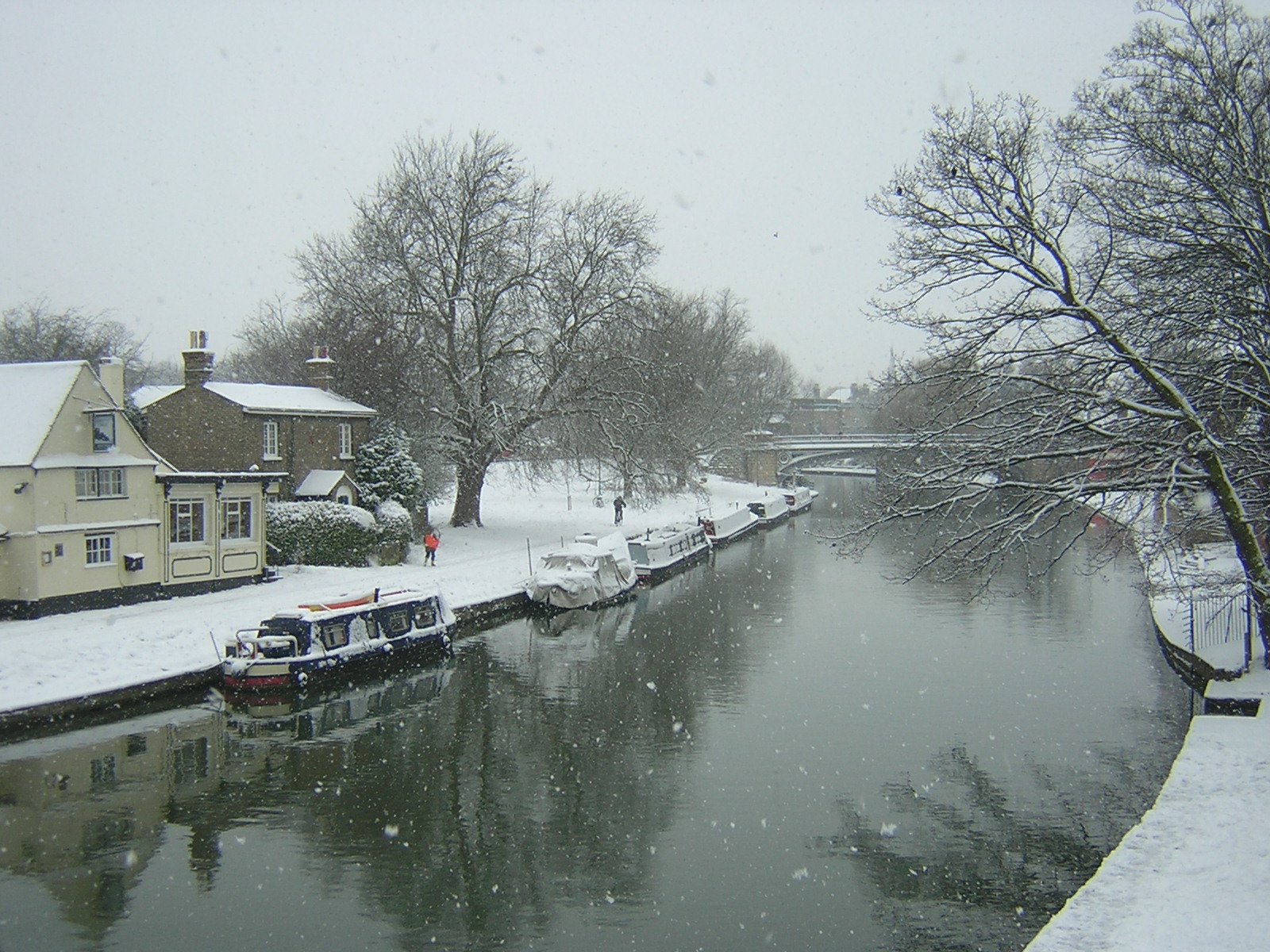
The River Cam at Midsummer Common with the Victoria Avenue Bridge in the background and the Fort St George In England public house on the left.

Victoria Bridge is a single-arch road bridge across the River Cam in Cambridge, England. It carries Victoria Avenue. Immediately to the north is Chesterton Road and a major junction with Victoria Road and Milton Road.

The bridge was built in 1889–90 to connect the then village of Chesterton (now a suburb) to the north with Cambridge to the south. At the same time, Victoria Avenue was constructed to the south, dividing Jesus Green to the west from Midsummer Common to the east.

The foundation stone was laid by Frederic Wace, the mayor of Cambridge, on 4 November 1889 and the bridge was officially opened by Wace on 11 December 1890. The bridge was rebuilt for strengthening in 1992.

== See also ==
- List of bridges in Cambridge
- Magdalene Bridge to the southwest
- Jesus Lock footbridge to the west
- Elizabeth Way Bridge to the east
