= Jesus Green =

Park in Cambridge, England

Coordinates: 52°12′47.67″N 000°07′23.12″E

Stereo image
Right frame
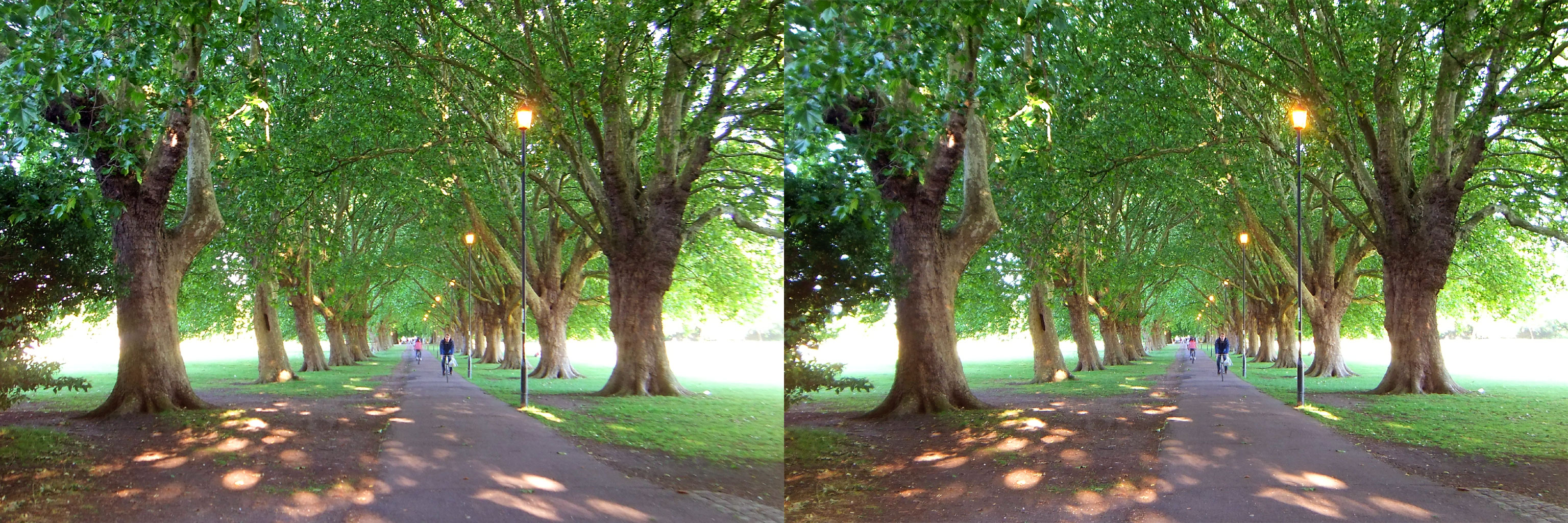
Left frame
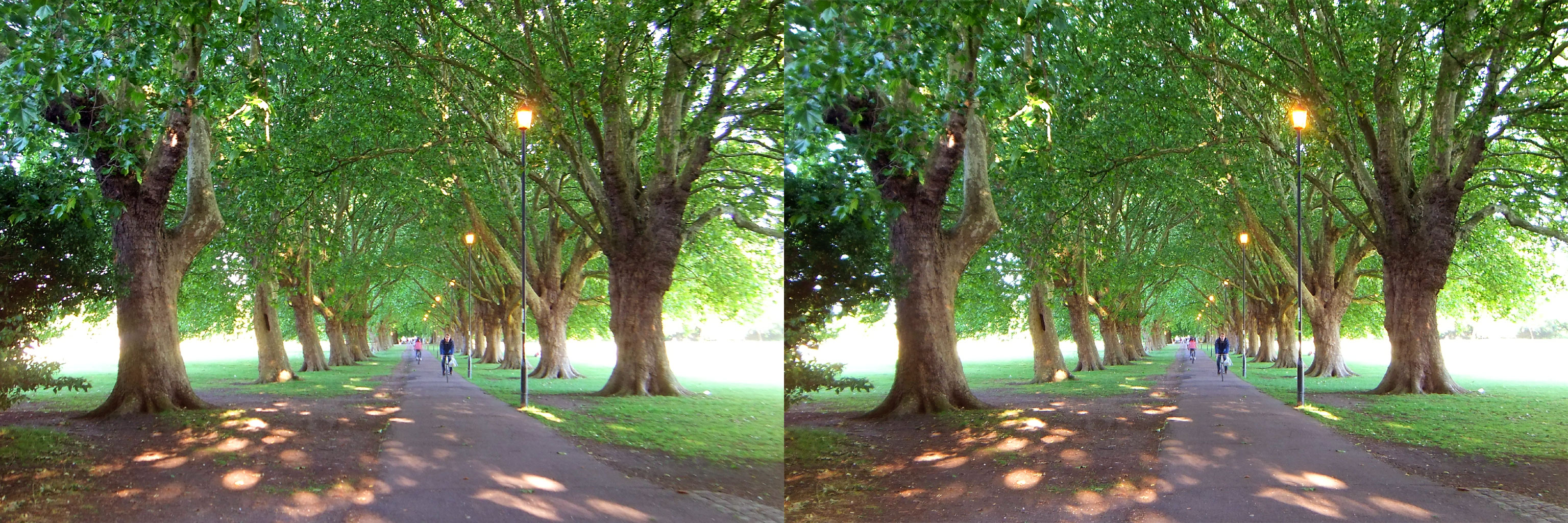
Cross-eye view
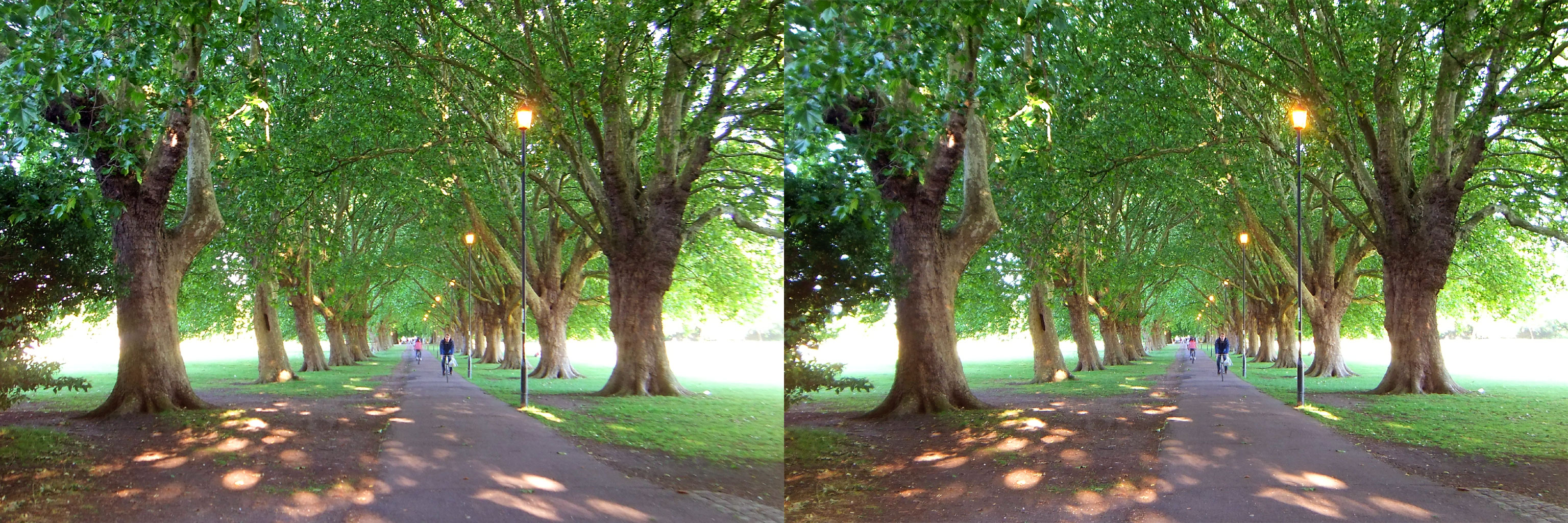
Parallel view
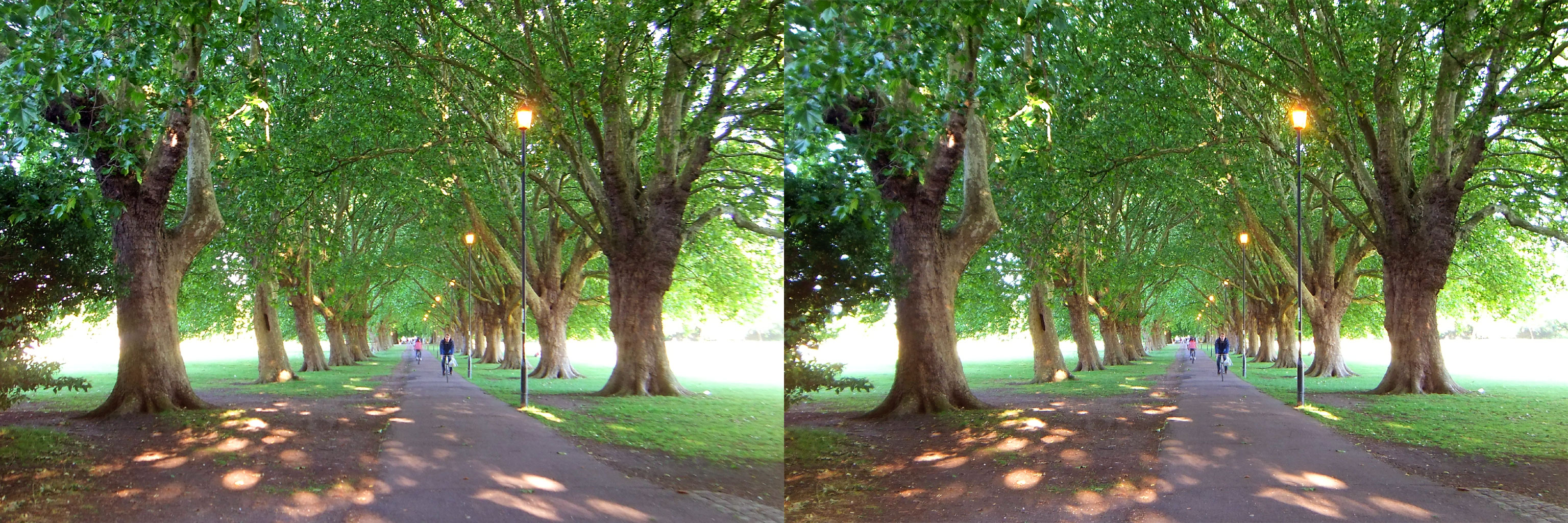

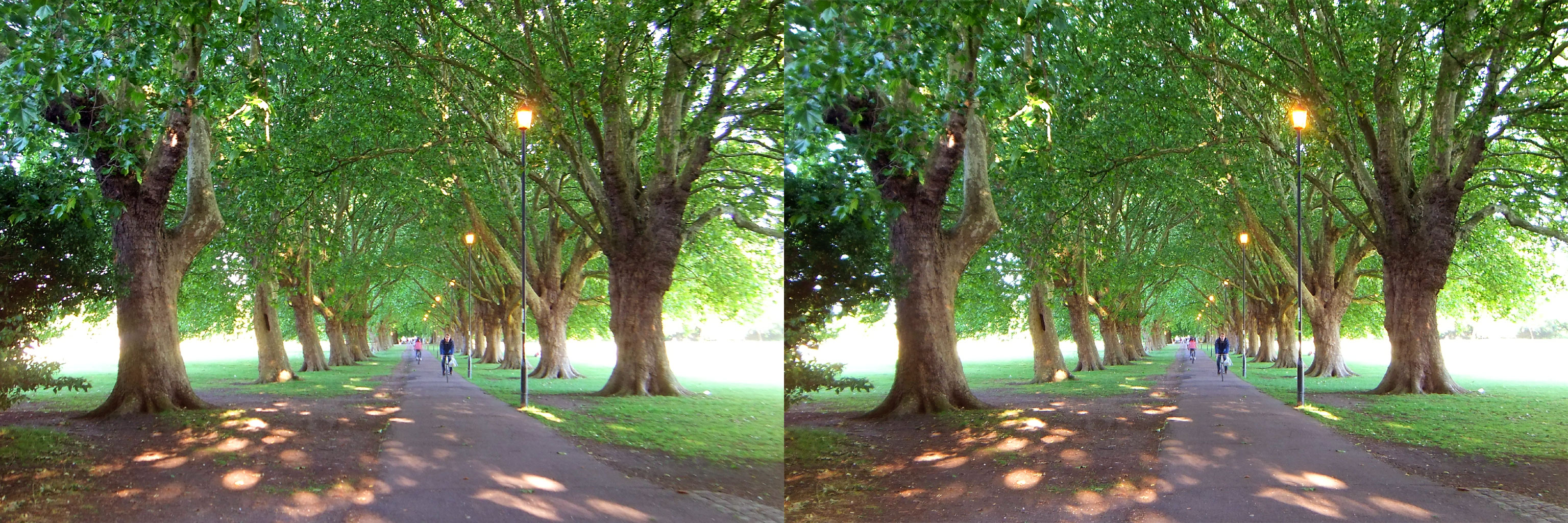
- Avenue of London plane trees on Jesus Green.

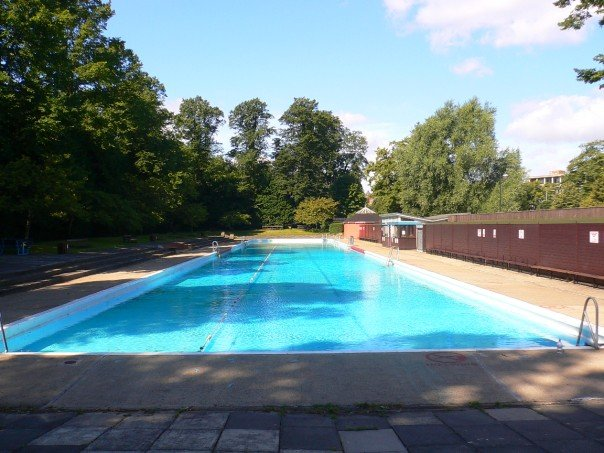
Jesus Green Swimming Pool.

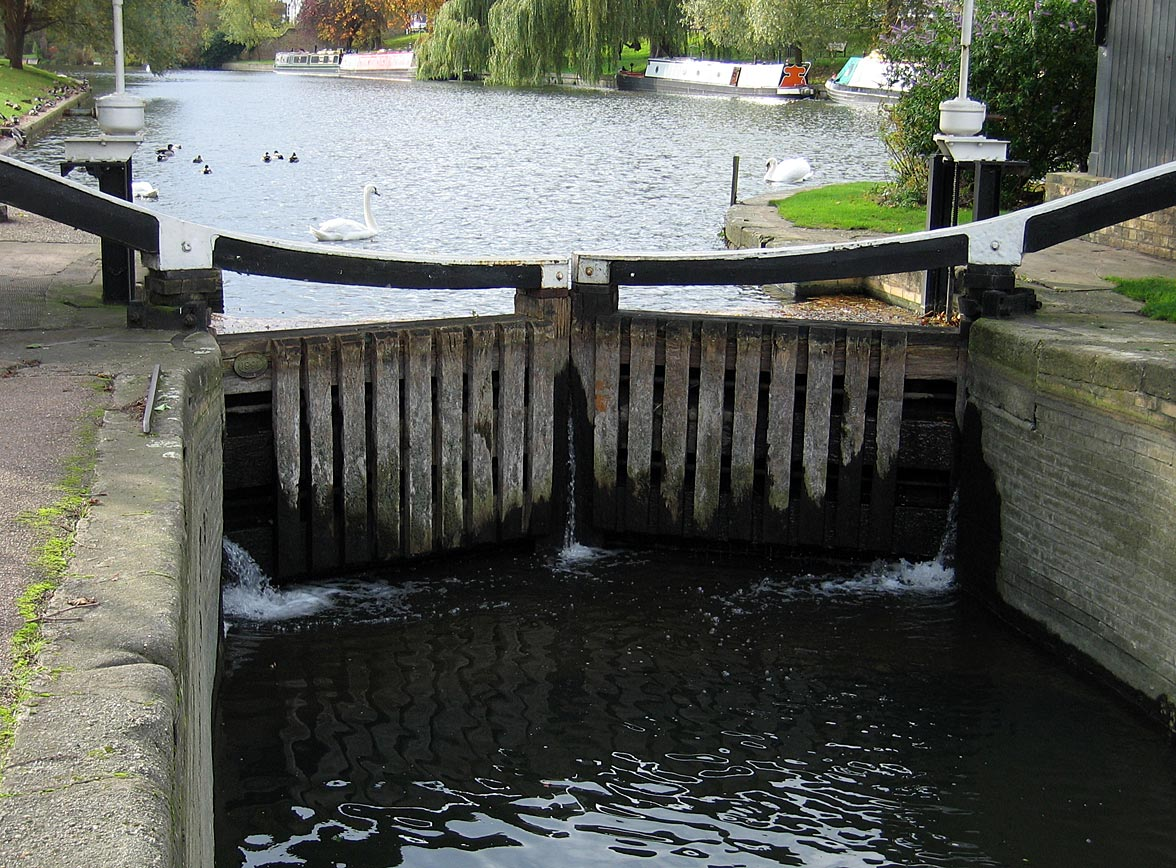
Jesus Lock on the River Cam at Jesus Green.

Jesus Green is a park in the north of central Cambridge, Cambridgeshire, England, north of Jesus College. Jesus Ditch runs along the southern edge of Jesus Green. On the northern edge of Jesus Green is the River Cam, with Chesterton Road (the A1303) on the opposite side. To the east is Victoria Avenue and beyond that Midsummer Common, common land that is still used for grazing. Victoria Avenue crosses the Cam at Victoria Bridge, connecting to Chesterton Road, at the northeastern corner of Jesus Green.

Jesus Green was separated from Midsummer Common in 1890 when Victoria Avenue was built. Jesus Green has since become a park and is no longer maintained in a state suitable for grazing.

The Jesus Green Swimming Pool is a lido on the northern edge of Jesus Green next to the River Cam. It is one of the few remaining examples of the lidos built across the country in the 1920s. It is among the longest outdoor swimming pools in Europe at 100 yards (91 m) in length.

Close by on the River Cam is Jesus Lock. The stretch north (downstream) of Jesus Lock is sometimes called the lower river. The stretch between Jesus Lock and Baits Bite Lock is much used for rowing. There are also many residential boats on this stretch, their occupants forming a community who call themselves the Camboaters. The stretch above Jesus Lock is sometimes known as the middle river. Access for mechanically powered boats is prohibited above 'La Mimosa' public house (at the upstream end of Jesus Green) between 1 April and 30 September, when the middle (and upper) river are open only to manually propelled craft, many traditional flat-bottomed punts.

In 2001, the Cambridge Beer Festival moved to Jesus Green. It has been held each May ever since.

== See also ==
- Christ's Pieces, to the south
- Parker's Piece, further south
- The Backs, upstream
