= Jesus Lock =

Lock in Cambridge, England

Coordinates: 52°12′46″N 0°7′15″E

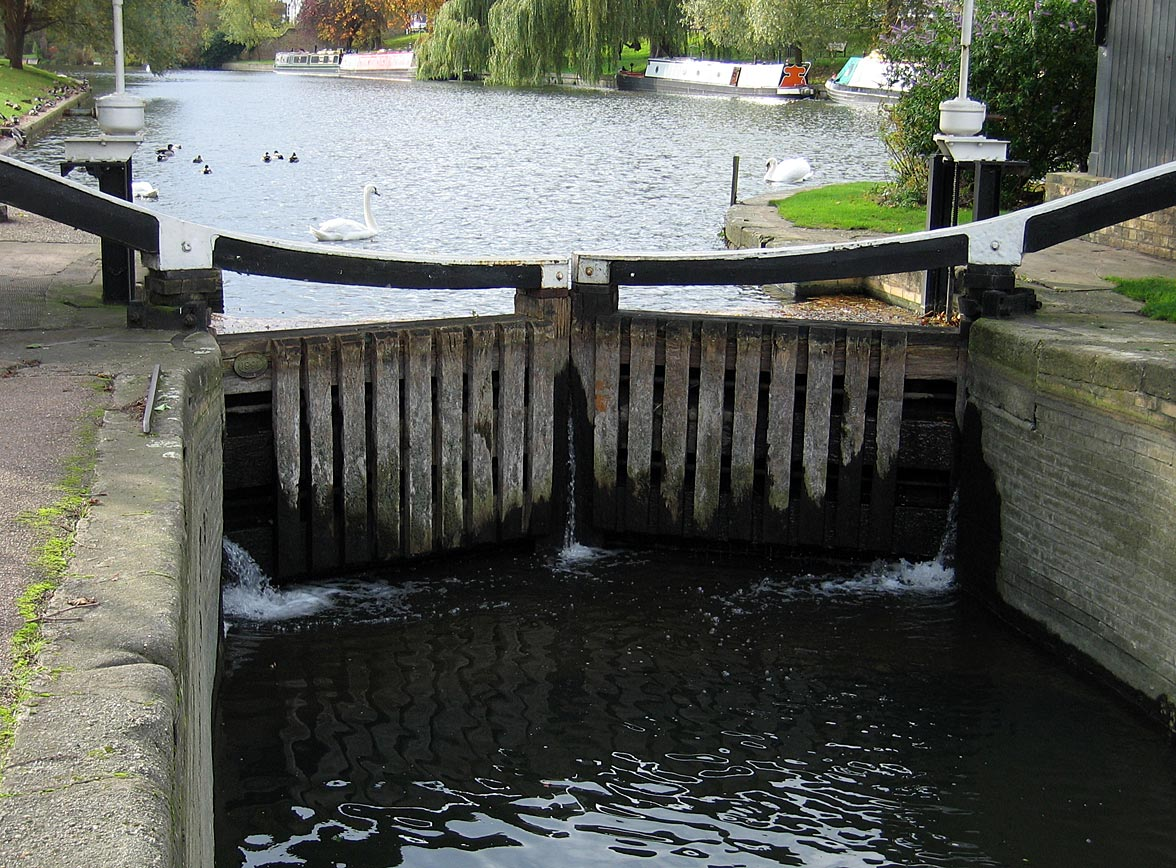
Jesus Lock on the River Cam at Jesus Green.

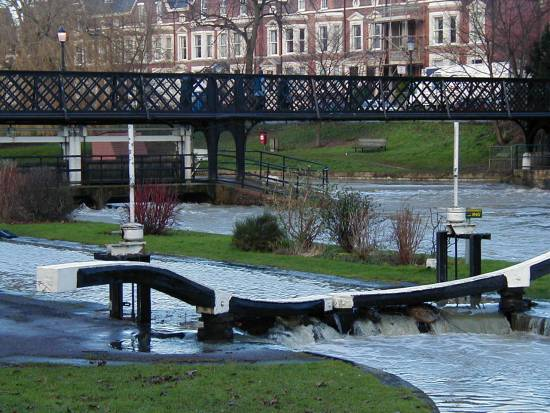
The lock and footbridge during flooding in 2001.

Jesus Lock is a lock on the River Cam in the north of central Cambridge, England. This is Lock No. 1 on the navigable portion of the River Cam. It was built in 1836 and is the only lock in the city. Jesus Green Lock Cottage, the former lock-keeper's cottage, is by the lock on Jesus Green. It was formerly owned by the Conservators of the River Cam and rented out to students. In 2016 permission to convert it into a café was refused; it was sold in 2021 to private buyers.

The lock is located north of Jesus Green, which itself is north of Jesus College, hence the name. To the north of Jesus Lock is Chesterton Road (the A1303). To the east (downstream) is Victoria Avenue Bridge on Victoria Avenue and beyond that Midsummer Common, common land still used for grazing. Close by just downstream is Jesus Green Swimming Pool, a very long outdoor lido.

The stretch of river northeast (downstream) of Jesus Lock is sometimes called the lower river. The stretch between Jesus Lock and Baits Bite Lock is much used for rowing. There are also many residential boats on this stretch, their occupants forming a community who call themselves the Camboaters. The stretch above Jesus Lock is sometimes known as the middle river.

== Footbridge ==
Jesus Lock footbridge on the Cam links Chesterton Road with Jesus Green for pedestrians next to the lock. The bridge has metal trellis railings and a wooden surface for walking. Cyclists are advised to dismount when crossing the bridge.

The bridge was built c.1892, soon after Victoria Avenue Bridge, close by downstream at the northeast corner of Jesus Green. The next bridge to the southwest (upstream) is Magdalene Bridge.

== See also ==
- List of bridges in Cambridge
