= Jesus Green Swimming Pool =

Lido in Cambridge, England

Coordinates: 52.212963°N 0.123188°E

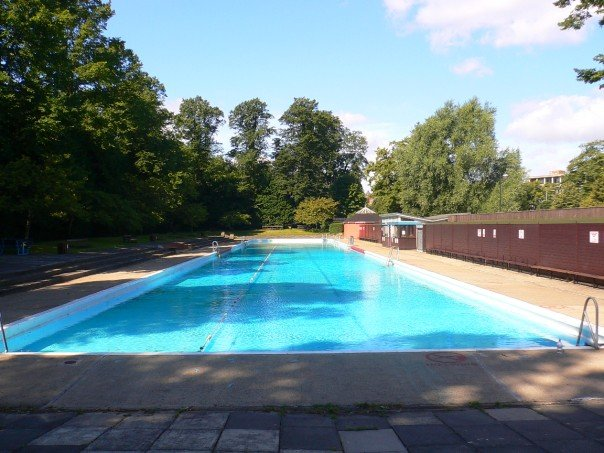
Jesus Green pool

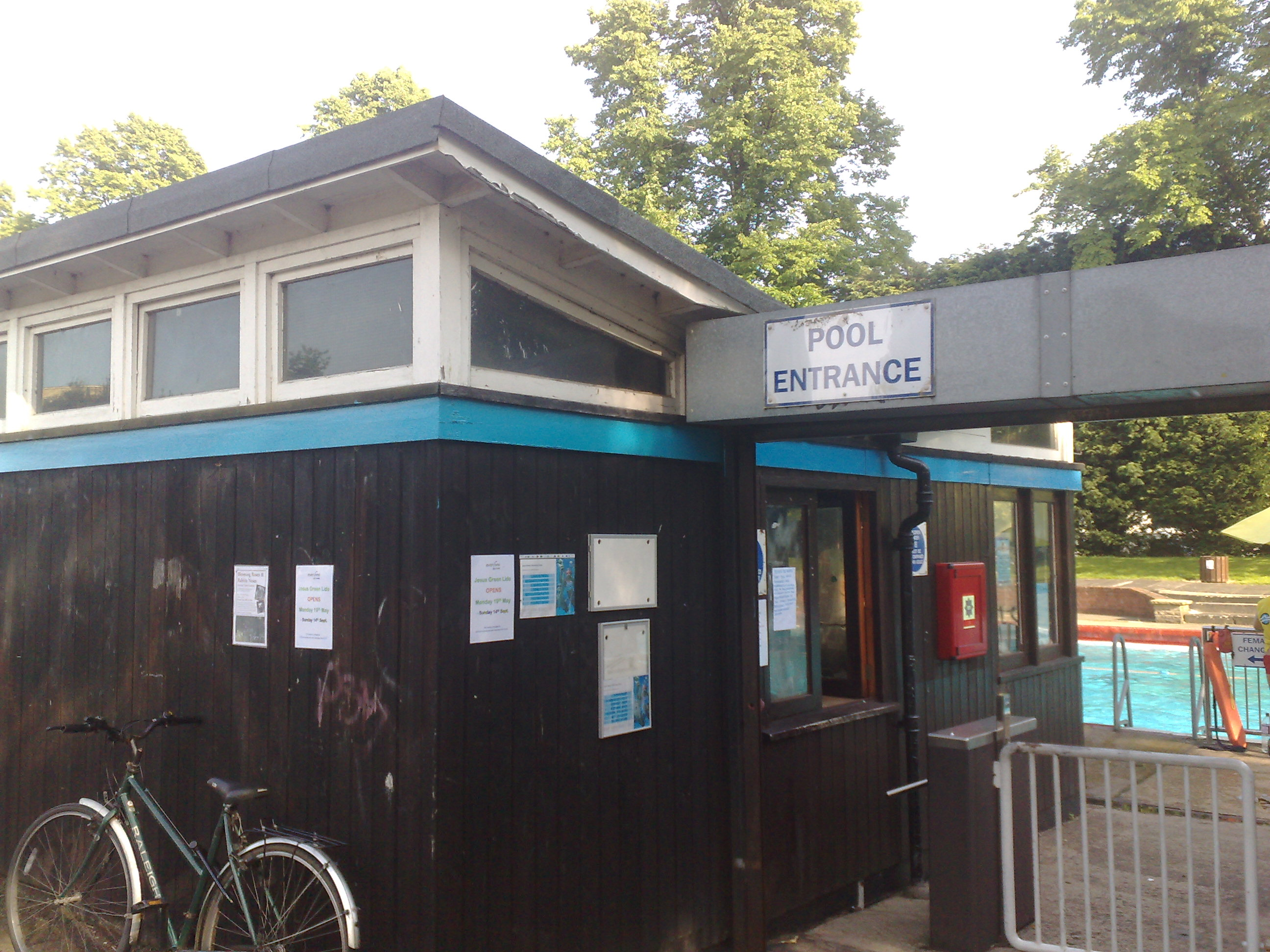
Entrance

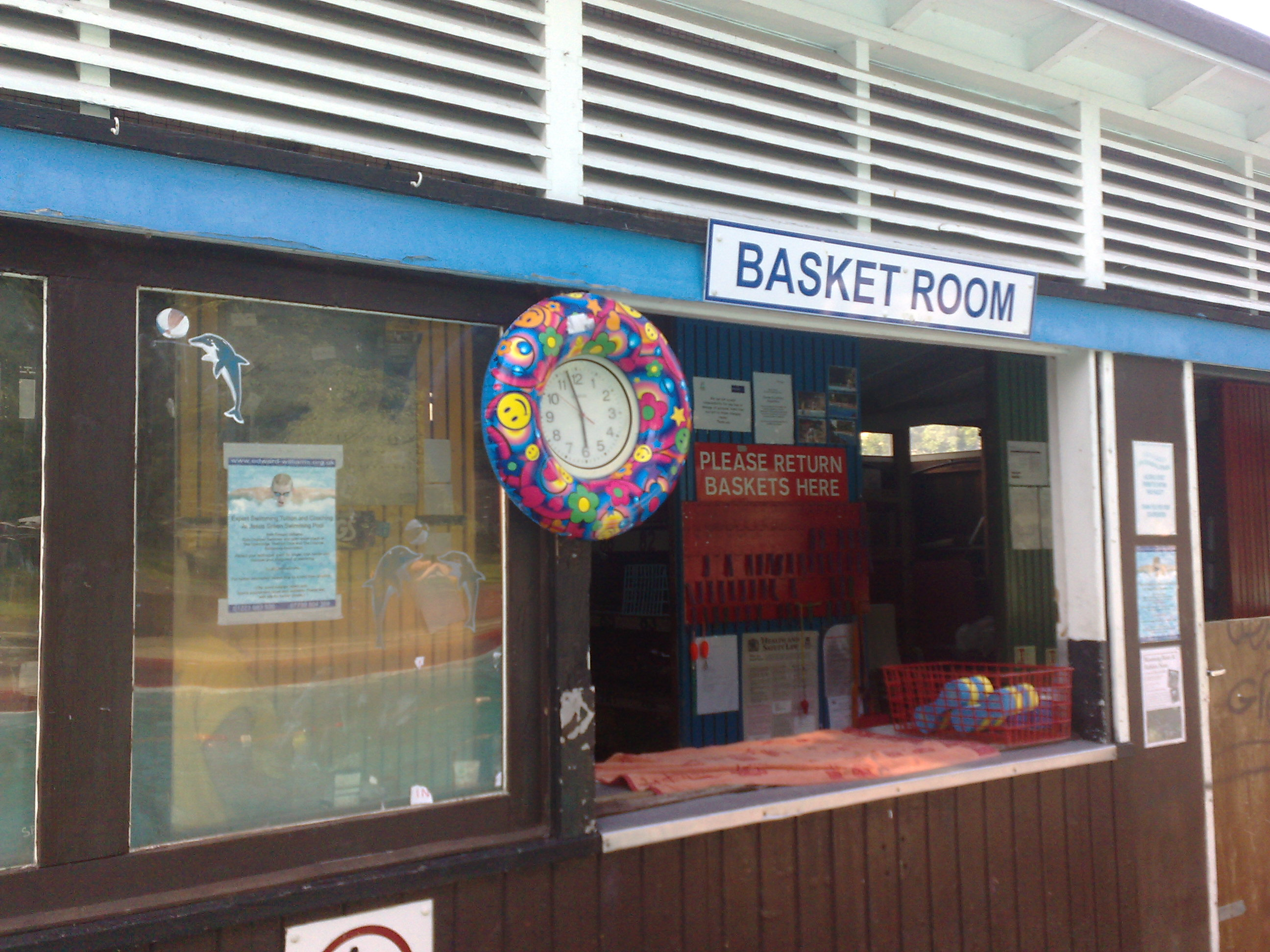
The Basket Room

Jesus Green Swimming Pool is a lido situated on Jesus Green in Cambridge, England. Opened in 1923, it is one of the few remaining examples of the lidos built across the country in the 1920s — open air pools with space for activities other than swimming. Unusually, the pool is significantly longer than it is wide — this was a design idea to mimic swimming in the nearby river. It opens for public bathing every day from May to September each year, and remains open but operates reduced hours over the winter period.

Jesus Green, though only 15 yards (14 m) wide, is among the longest outdoor swimming pools in Europe at 100 yards (91 m) in length (the largest freshwater lido is Tooting Bec Lido in London, which is the same length, but 33 yards (30 m) wide).

It has a depth of 1.2 metres (3.9 ft) at each end, and a maximum depth of 2.5 metres (8.2 ft) in the centre. Diving is allowed into the centre section of the pool. The pool has a dedicated swimming lane for 'fast' swimmers and the remaining two-thirds is for recreational swimming.

The pool is unheated. The organisation owning Jesus Green Pool maintain data on water temperatures on their website.

Located alongside the River Cam opposite Chesterton Road between Jesus Lock and Victoria Avenue Bridge, the pool has sunbathing space and is paved on one side with grass on the other. A sauna is available.

A map giving the detailed layout of the lido can be seen on OpenStreetMap.

Despite past attempts to shut it down, it has remained open. In 1997, the pool facilities were upgraded, with new shower and toilet facilities added, although the new design was complained about, due to problems with the architecture and plumbing. The pool still retains most of its original features and remains of interest from a historical point of view. There are separate male and female changing facilities, and domed structures containing showers at either end. Baskets, and room for their storage, are provided for clothes.

There is a much smaller outdoor pool upstream of the city centre at Sheep's Green, and swimming in the Cam remains popular near Grantchester.

== In Media ==
A short film titled "Jesus Green Pool" was produced in 2004 by amateur director Chris Cox. The film emphasizes the seasonal nature of the pool by documenting a single summer at the pool; from opening in the Spring, to closing in the Autumn. It was shown at the Cambridge Film Festival in the summer of 2005.
