= Cambridge Beer Festival =

British festival

Coordinates: 52.2121°N 0.1238°E

The summer Cambridge Beer Festival is the longest-running CAMRA beer festival in the United Kingdom, having started in 1974. It is held at the end of May just before the Whitsuntide Bank Holiday. Until 2019, there was also a smaller winter beer festival held indoors at the University Social Club,. Both festivals were run by Cambridge & District CAMRA. The 2020 festivals were cancelled due to the COVID-19 pandemic, and the summer festival did not run again until 2023. The winter festival did not return as the University Social Club did not re-open post-COVID and is now in an area earmarked for redevelopment.

== Summer festival ==
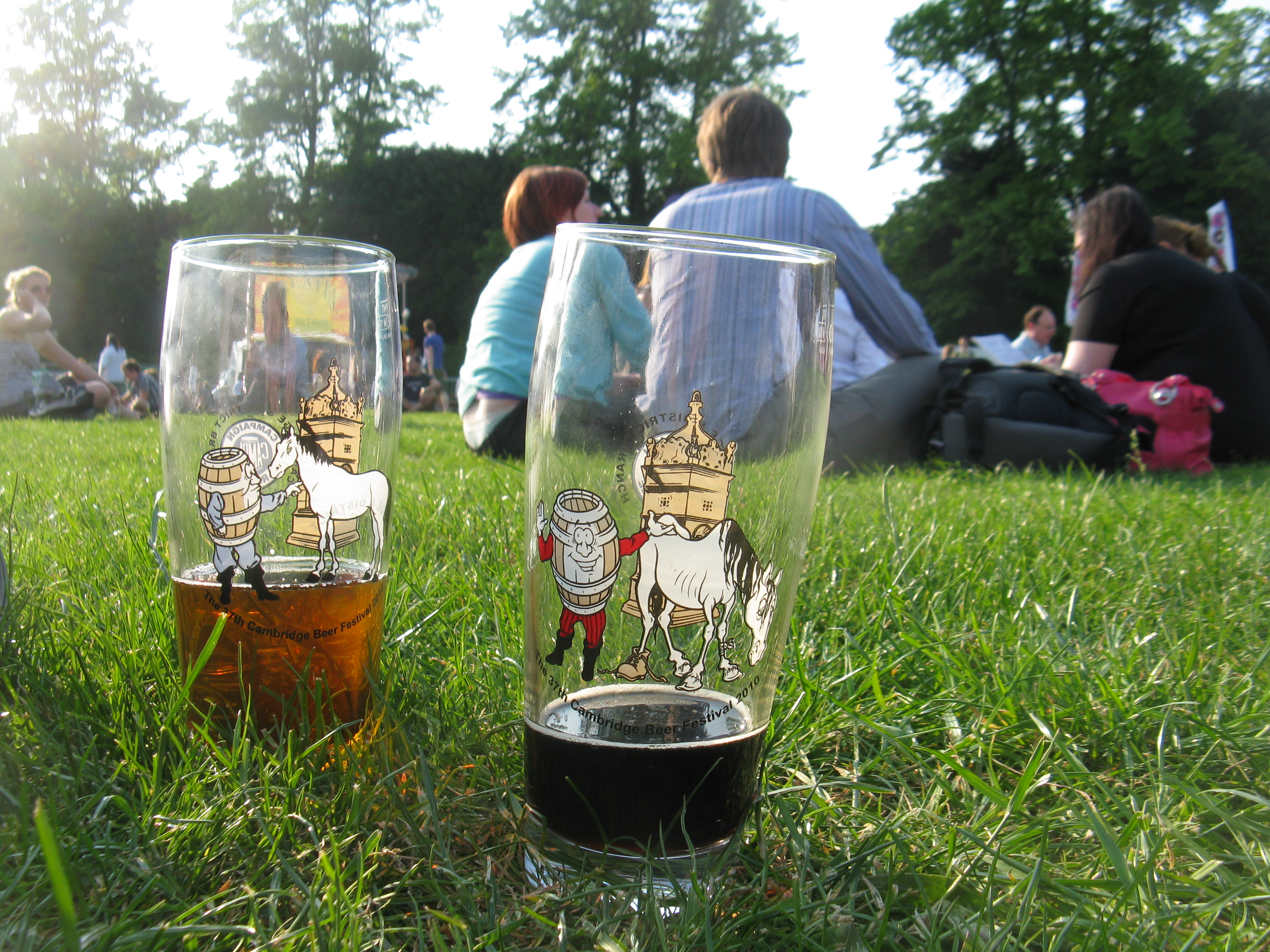
Commemorative glasses from the 2010 Cambridge Beer Festival

The summer beer festival began at the Cambridge Corn Exchange in 1974 and remained there until 1982. After skipping a year in 1983, it moved between the Guildhall and Midsummer Common before returning to the Corn Exchange in 1988 (the 14th festival). In 1992, it moved to the Cambridge City Football Club ground just off Milton Road where it became an outside festival in huge marquees. During its residency at the football ground time it grew (helped by not being limited by a fixed building) and settled into its now established time of year at the end of May (having previously been held in August).

In 2001 (the 28th festival) it moved to Jesus Green where it has remained ever since. Since moving to Jesus Green it has grown significantly. The location attracts a lot more passing trade than the football ground. The festival is now the second largest in country in terms of visitors (behind the Great British Beer Festival). In 2006 it had over 170 real ales, 50 ciders and perries as well as a large range of foreign beers and country wines. 2007 was another record-breaking year, with 30,384 visitors, who drank 494 kilderkins (about 70,000 pints) of beer and 194 tubs (about 7,700 pints) of cider and perry. The 39th festival in 2012 set another new record, with around 41,000 visitors drinking around 560 kilderkins (80,000 pints) of beer and 330 tubs (13,000 pints) of cider. The 43rd festival in 2016 was also a record year with around 41,000 visitors drinking 86,000 pints of beer, 13,000 pints of cider, 9,300 pints of foreign beer and 1,600 bottles of wine and mead.

The beer festival is also famous for its cheese stall which, unlike many food stalls at beer festivals, is run by the CAMRA branch themselves. The stall sells a wide range of traditional cheeses and breads as well as olives, pickled eggs, pork pies, scotch eggs, etc. One tonne of cheese was sold during the 2016 festival.

The Licensee for all the events up until 2011 has been David Short, Landlord of The Queens Head in Newton, Cambridgeshire. Since 2011 the festival organiser has taken on the role. The organisers and staff are all unpaid volunteers. As a thank you for their effort they receive lunch and dinner (when working), together with free or discounted beer.

Each year the festival gives a charity the opportunity to raise funds during the event. In 2018, Stars, who provide specialist bereavement support and counselling for young people in Cambridgeshire, raised over £18,500. The 2020 festival was cancelled due to the COVID-19 pandemic. The festival next ran in 2023, when over £15,000 was raised for East Anglia's Children's Hospices

== Winter festival ==
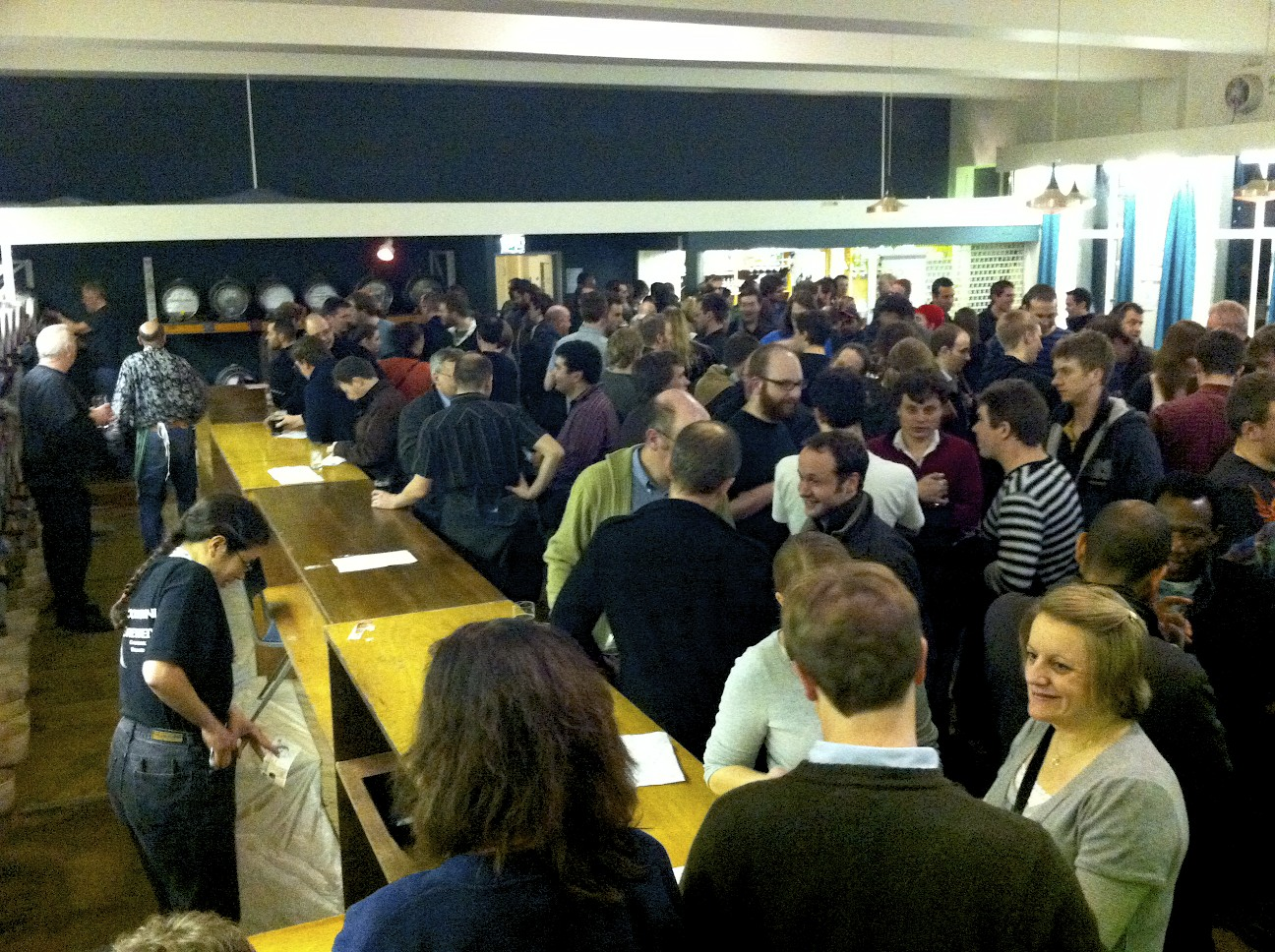
Cambridge Winter Beer Festival at the University Social Club

The Winter Beer Festival was held in November at the Cambridge University Social Club, Mill Lane, Cambridge CB2 1RX. It began in 1997 as a January event at Anglia Ruskin University, and subsequently moved to the University Social Club. Another beer festival, the Octoberfest, was also held annually at the University Social Club from 2007 to 2017. After the winter festival in January 2018, the two festivals were merged into a single Winter Beer Festival held annually in November, six months after the summer festival. The change meant that there were two winter beer festivals held in 2018. The final winter festival was held in 2019. After COVID in 2020, it did not return as the University Social Club did not re-open and is now in an area earmarked for redevelopment.
