= Fort St George In England =

Pub in Cambridge, England

The Fort St George In England
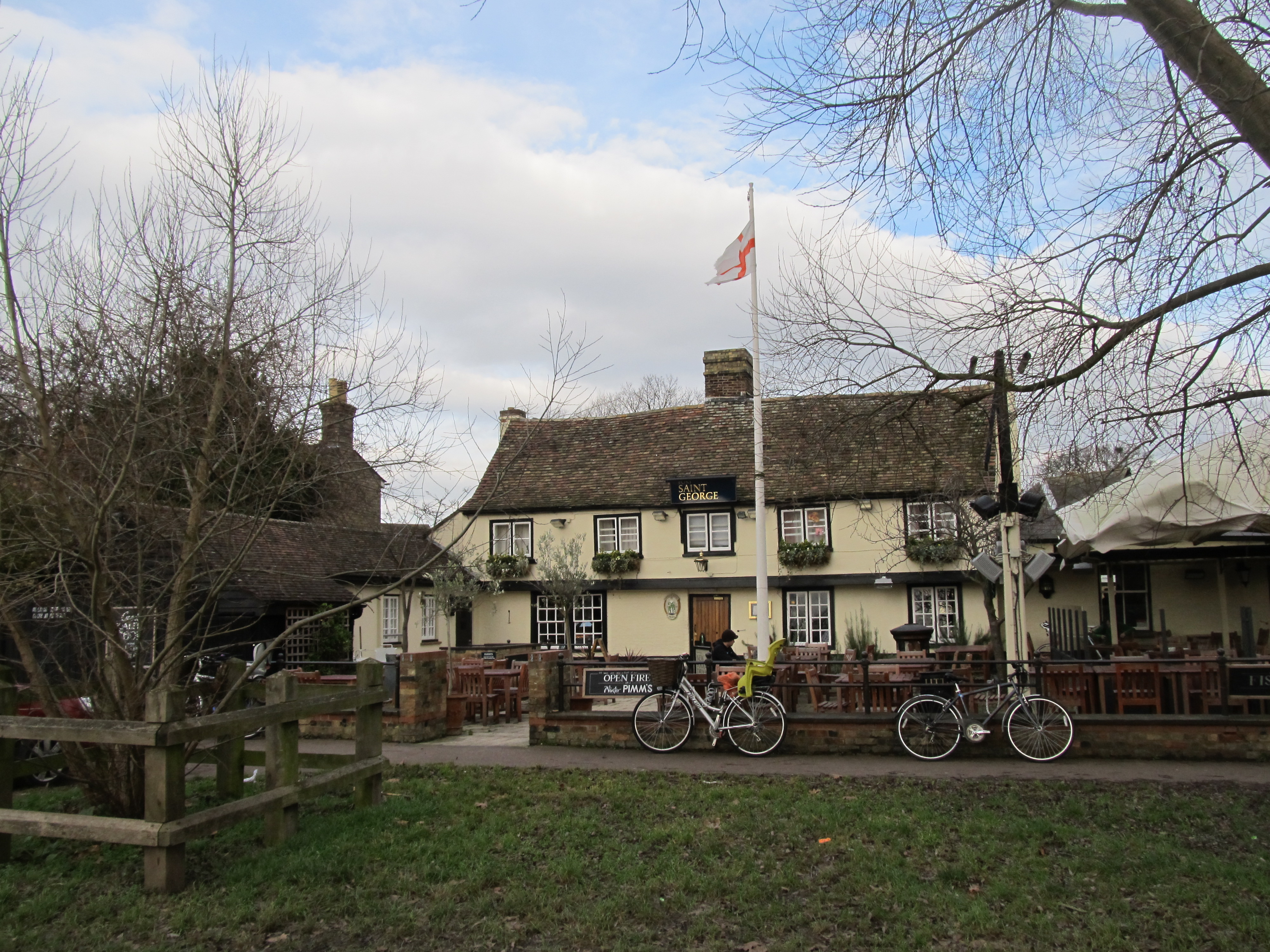
- The Fort St George In England in 2011

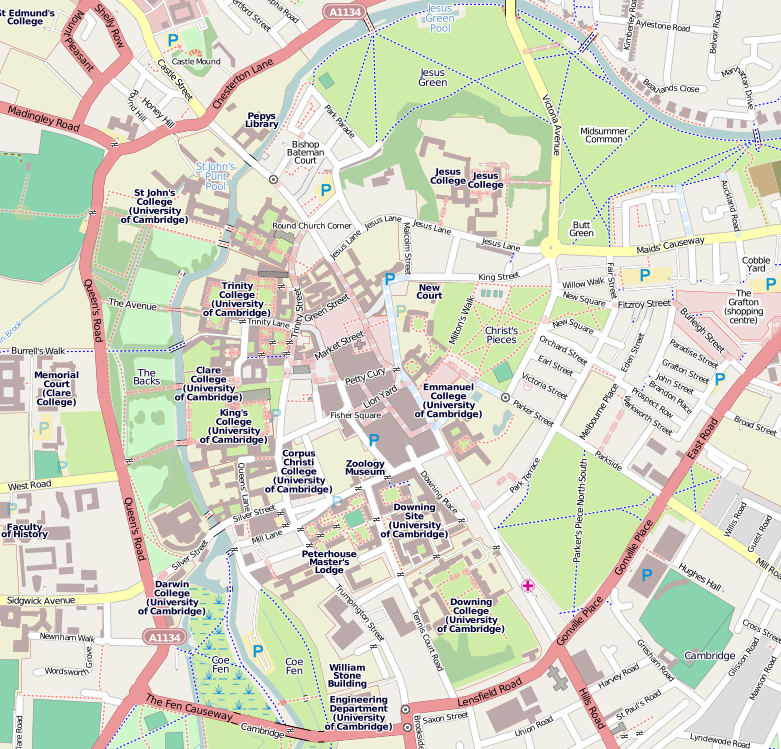
- Location within Central Cambridge

General information
- Coordinates: 52.2124°N 0.1278°E

The Fort St George In England is the oldest pub on the River Cam in Cambridge, England.

The Grade II listed timber-framed building on Midsummer Common dates in part from the 16th century, and although "much altered and enlarged over the years, still has considerable charm. Especially notable is the snug to the right of the main entrance which has some wonderful ancient panelling and a good tiled floor."

The pub is owned by the Greene King brewery.

The unusual name of the pub, commonly abbreviated to just 'Fort St George', but now better known as The Fort, reflects a supposed resemblance to the East India Company's Fort St George at Madras (now Chennai) in India.

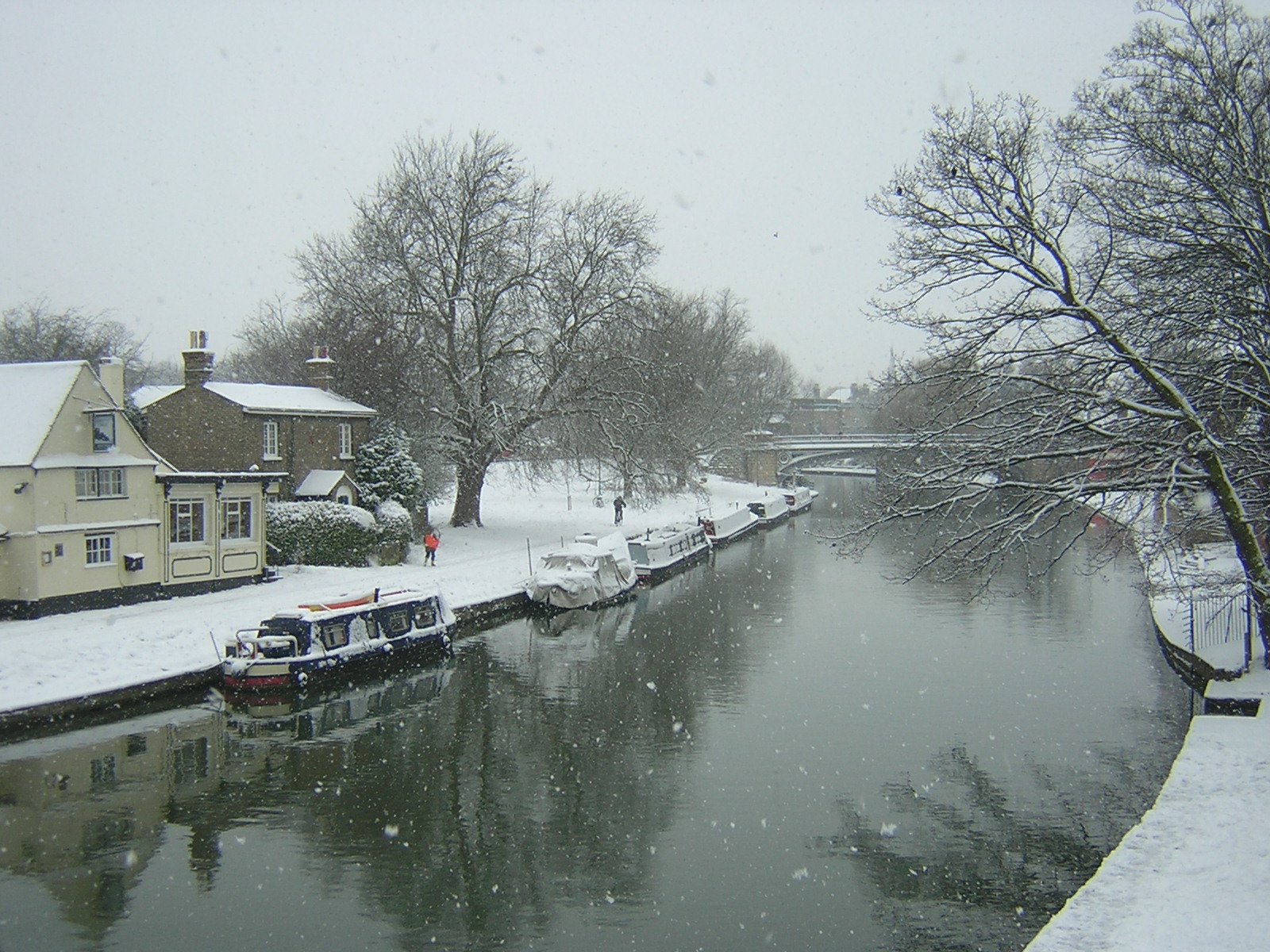
The River Cam at Midsummer Common with the Victoria Avenue Bridge in the background and the Fort St George public house on the left.
