= Midsummer Common =

Common land in Cambridge, England

Coordinates: 52°12′37″N 0°7′43″E

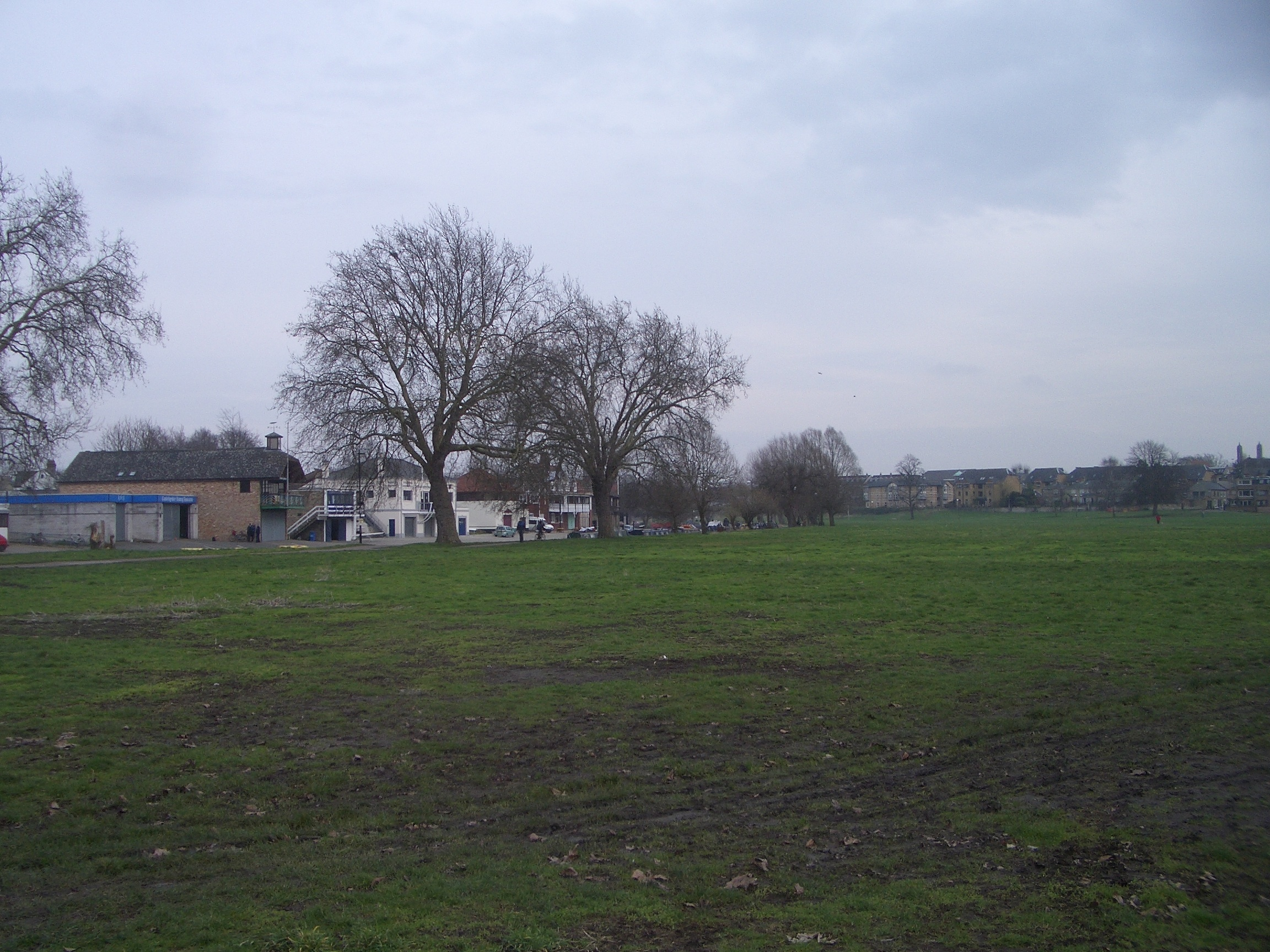
View of Midsummer Common, looking east. Boathouses can be seen on the opposite bank of the River Cam, and houseboats are visible on the river

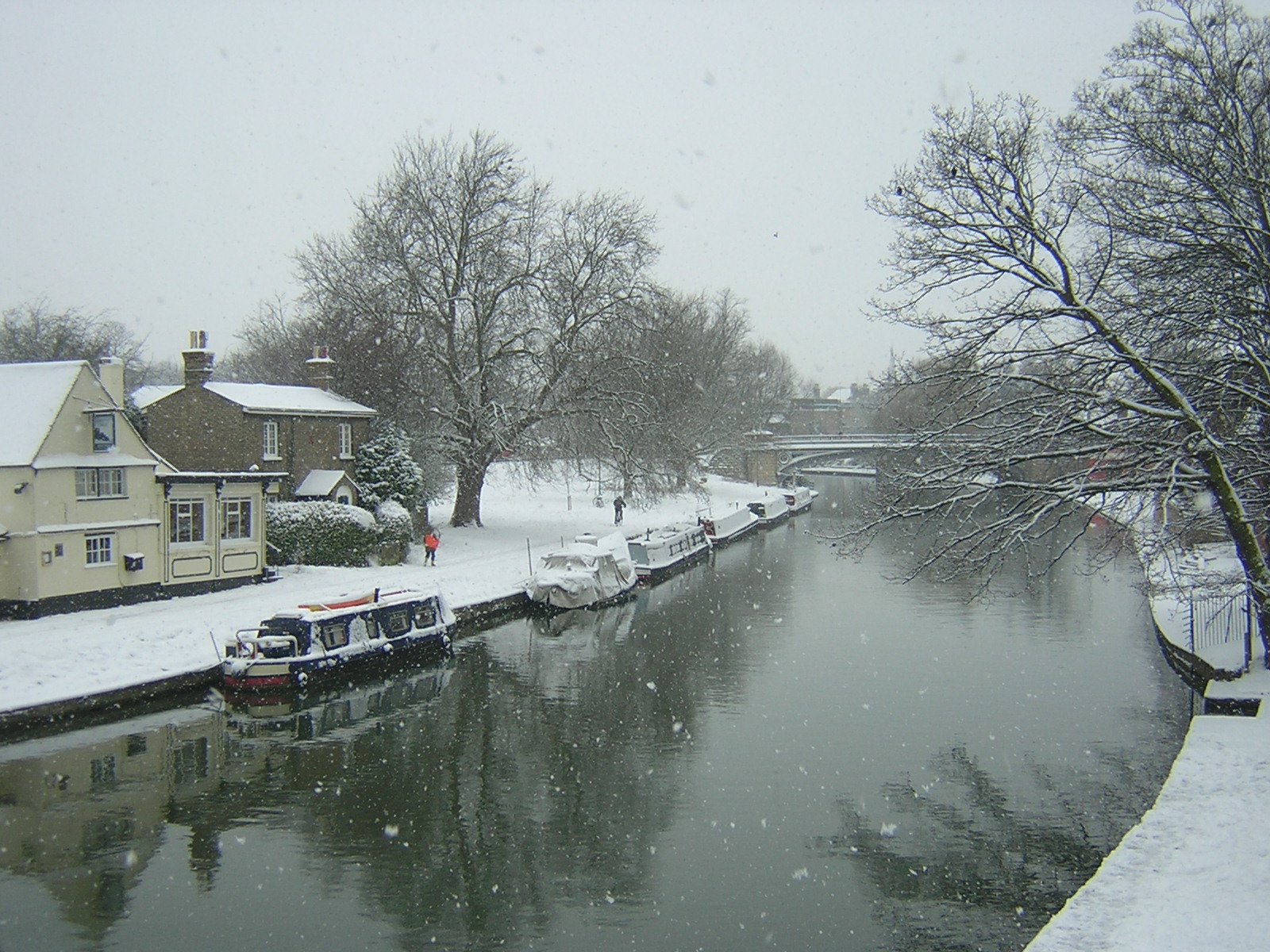
The River Cam at Midsummer Common with the Fort St George public house on the left and the Victoria Avenue Bridge in the background

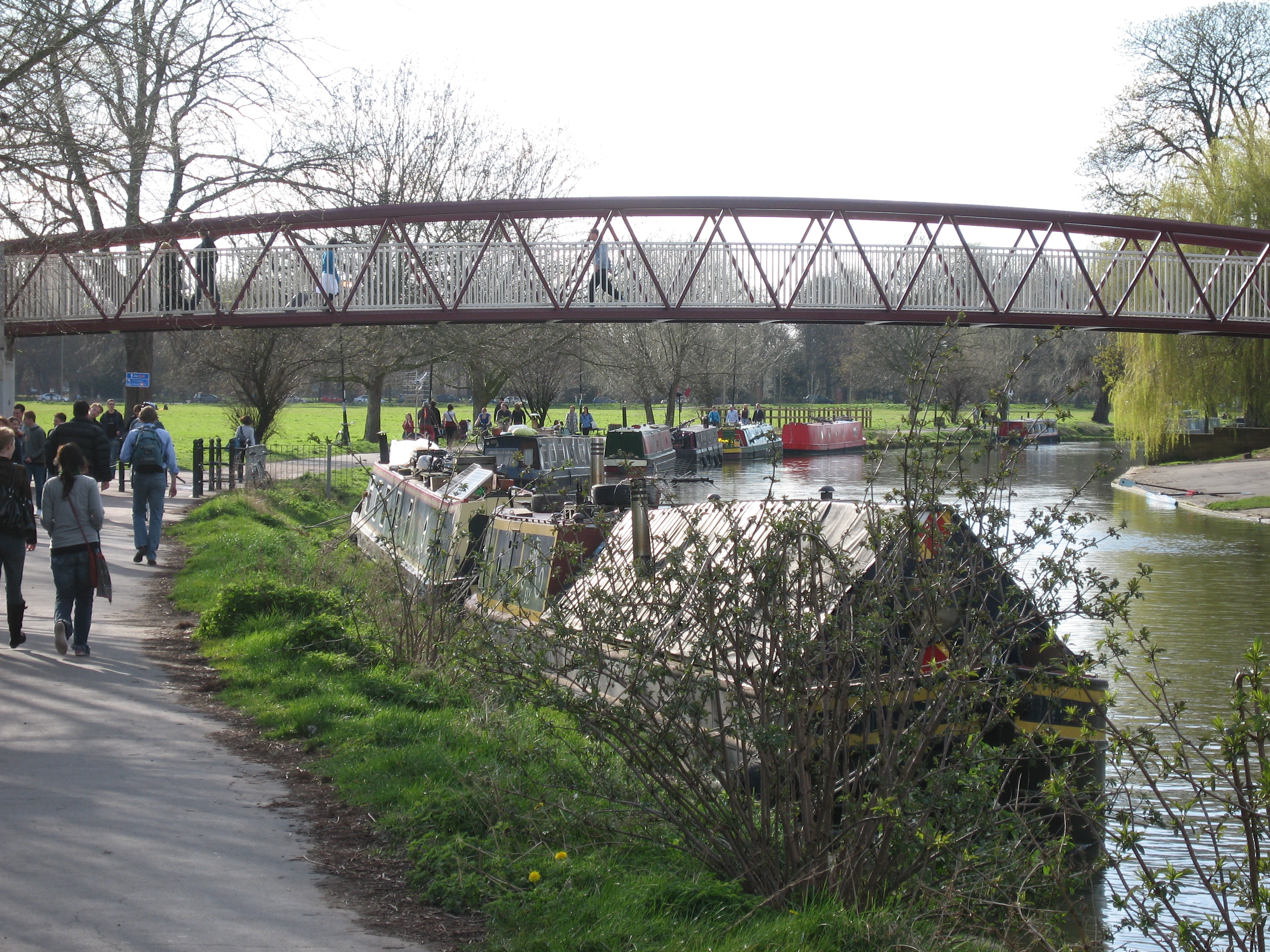
The footbridge across the Cam at Midsummer Common, with houseboats

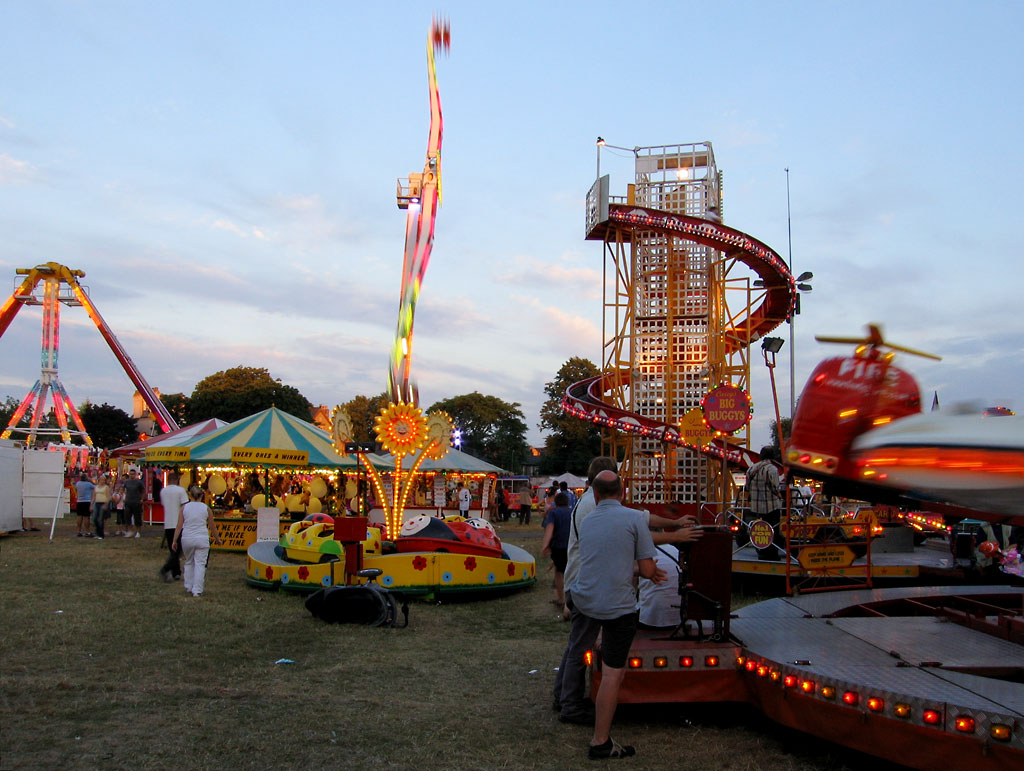
Cambridge Midsummer Fair on Midsummer Common, 2005

Midsummer Common is an area of common land in Cambridge, England. It lies northeast of the city centre on the south bank of the River Cam.

The common borders the River Cam and houseboats are often moored on the common's bank. The boathouses of most of the colleges of Cambridge University are on the opposite bank.

== History ==
In 1874, Midsummer Common was scene to the notorious murder of Emma Rolfe.

== Events ==
Regular major events held on the Common include The May Day Fair, Strawberry Fair and fireworks on Guy Fawkes Night, 5 November, which regularly attract around 25,000 people. Other events include fun runs and cycling events where the common is used as a start and finish point. A vigil and lantern floating ceremony took place on the common on Hiroshima Memorial Day in 2006.

=== Midsummer Fair ===
Cambridge Midsummer Fair was granted a charter by King John in 1211, and was originally held on or near the feast of St Etheldreda. Originally a trade fair, income from the event went to the Barnwell Priory. In the sixteenth century the council and Mayor of Cambridge acquired the rights for the midsummer fair, with University Proctors retaining the right to search the fair for beggars, vagabonds and lewd women. The latter right in particular was hotly disputed. In the 18th century it was named the Pot fair due to the quantity of china traded there, and it was popular among gypsy travellers for trade in horse and cattle. In more recent times it has become a pleasure fair with amusements taking the place of trade in goods. It is heavily attended and has recently given rise to problems of safety and public order and with litter.

== Grazing ==
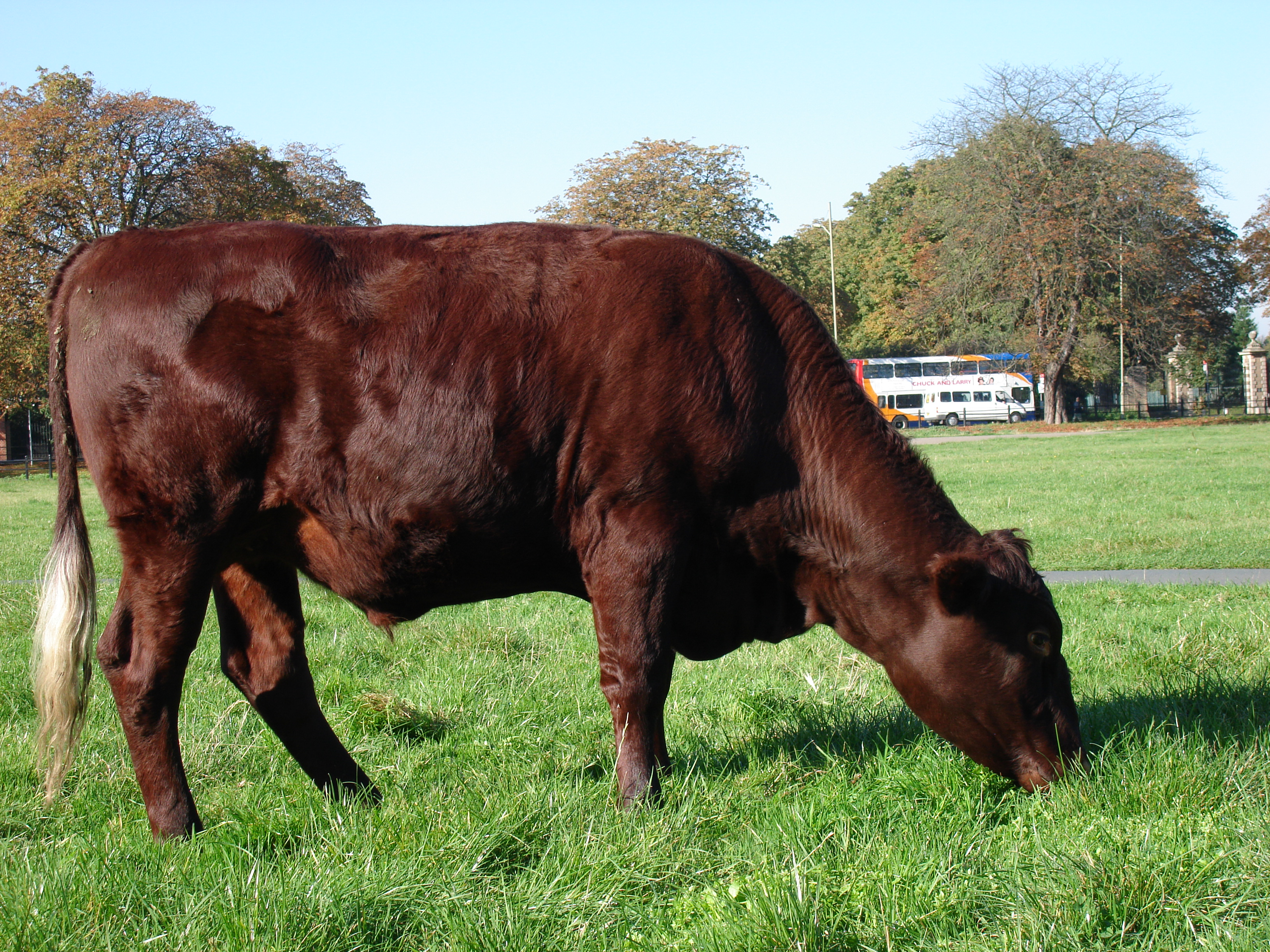
Red Poll bullock on Midsummer Common

In March 2006 Geoffrey King, who later became the chairman of the Friends of Midsummer Common, put up £20 to investigate the possibility of introducing a "residents' herd" of cows to the common, at a meeting of the Brunswick and North Kite Residents' Association.

On 7 April 2007, when there had been no cattle on the common for a number of years, a small number of Red Poll bullocks, owned by a Cambridge resident, were introduced to the common. The grazing of cattle on the common is controversial, given the other uses to which the common is put, which may conflict with grazing.

== Designation as a Common ==
Midsummer Common is registered under the Commons Registration Act 1965.

Cambridge City Council uses the term 'park' when describing the common:

Midsummer Common is classified as a Common located in an urban landscape in the centre of the city. The landscape setting affords opportunities to hold large events in a variety of formats.

Jesus Green was separated from Midsummer Common in 1890 when Victoria Avenue was built. Jesus Green is no longer maintained in a state suitable for grazing. In 1930, Jesus College exchanged land between what is now the Cutter Ferry bridge and Elizabeth Way for part of Butt's Green on the Jesus College side of Victoria Avenue.

== Butt's Green ==
Butt's Green is an area which, historically used for archery butts, is now part of Midsummer Common. The Butt's Green area is less disturbed by events than the other areas and tends to have a wider diversity of plant life.

== Antisocial behaviour ==
Midsummer Common, along with wide swathes of Cambridge City, has been a designated area under the Anti-social Behaviour Act 2003, s 20(3)-(5). During much of Winter 2006/07 this order only applied in the evenings and apparently applied to the whole common; as of February 2007 a new authorisation which was brought into force on 3 January 2006 and lasting for six months was publicised. This only applied to the boundary path, and one corner of the common. The area of the common designated under the act does not include the public toilets or the area in which half of the city's redeployable CCTV cameras have been deployed within 100 m of each other.

To quote from the order made by Superintendent Simon Megikcs:

I give this order with the consent of the Cambridge City Council on the grounds that despite interventions to curb significant and persistent antisocial behaviour caused by groups of persons collecting and settling in the local area such problems persist. This has led members of the local business community to feel intimidated and harassed. Conduct of persons includes street drinking and rowdy behaviour verbally abusing and intimidating passers by, urinating in the street, allowing dogs to run off their leads, drug misuse in public toilets rough sleeping and aggressive begging and street drug misuse and purchase leading to an influx of street dealers.

This applies to a large area of Cambridge including Mill Road, Parker's Piece, Christ's Pieces, Midsummer Common, Brunswick Gardens and Riverside.

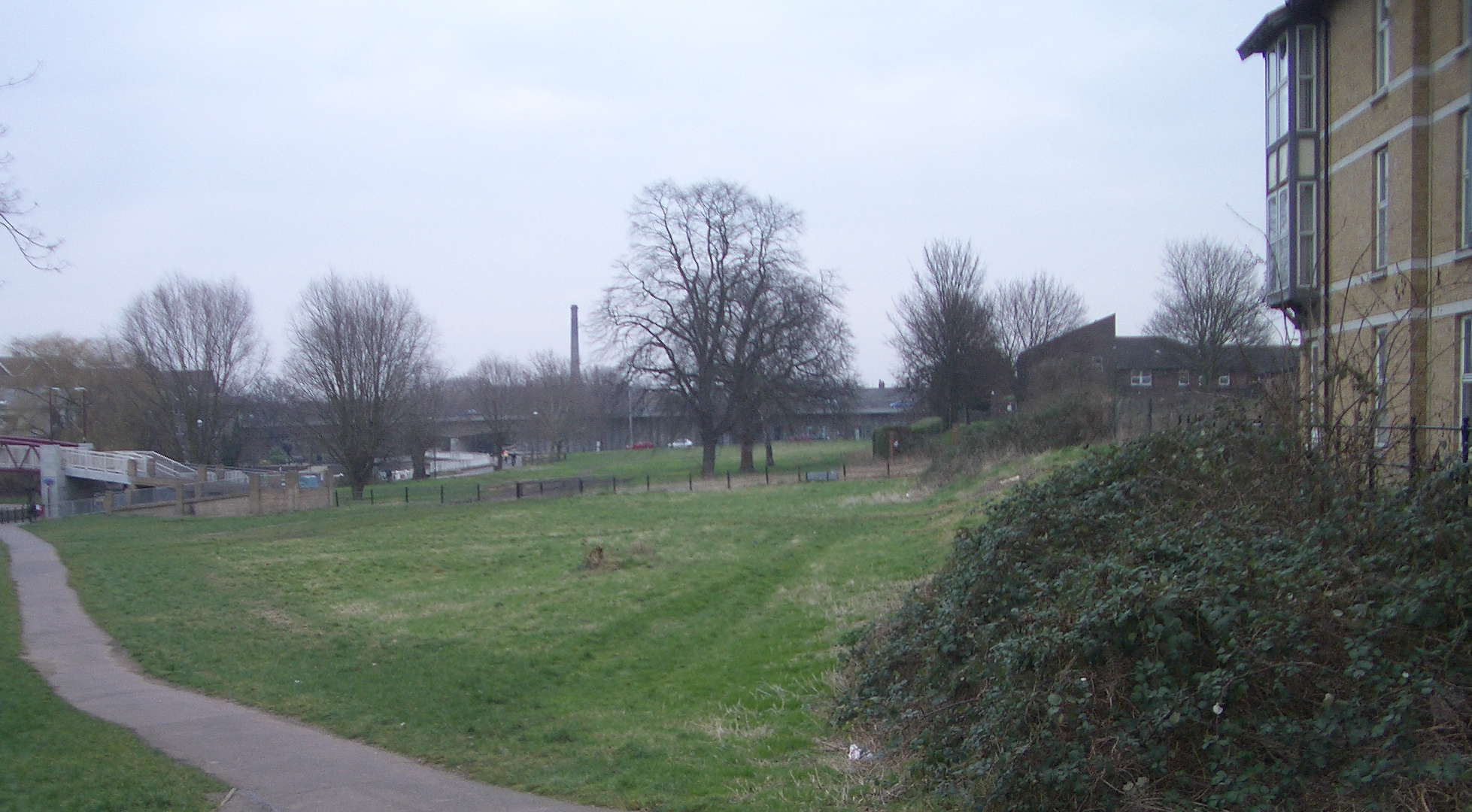
Photograph of the area of Midsummer Common designated under the Anti-Social Behaviour Act

Plan of the area of Midsummer Common designated under the Anti-Social Behaviour Act with the designated area hatched (grey)

The notice state that the order has been made with the consent of the City Council. Past practice suggests that this would have been given by a "Leader's decision". Council policy states that such decisions must be reported to [party] Group Leaders immediately and to the next available meeting of the Scrutiny Committee – no such decision was brought to the Scrutiny meeting on 10 January 2007.

=== Designated Public Places Order ===
Cambridge City Council believe that a Designated Public Places Order cannot be applied to the common, such an order might be a more appropriate manner of dealing with alcohol-related anti-social behaviour on the common.

The Council are applying for open-ended "premises licenses" for the whole extent of the open spaces. Owing to what we think is an unintended quirk in the legislation, DPPO controls cannot be enforced on land where a "premises license" is in force. Premises Licences are "in force" for the whole period during which they are valid, not just for periods during which alcohol is being served. This would prevent the use of DPPO powers on these open spaces and could therefore give rise to a displacement issue if DPPO controls are in force in adjoining areas. We understand that this problem has been raised with the Department of Culture, Media and Sport, but do not know whether steps will be taken to address it."

== Representative associations ==
The Friends of Midsummer Common was inaugurated in October 2006, initially made up of owners of residential property surrounding the common. Its founding chairman was Geoffrey King who resigned from the Brunswick & North Kite Residents Association before setting up the Friends of Midsummer Common. Their objectives include: "to work with organisers to ensure that events have minimal impact and cause no nuisance to local residents;". Alistair Wilson, Cambridge City Council's Green Space Manager was reported to have wanted a Friends of Midsummer Common group set up in May 2006.

Camboaters Community Association is an association of residential boaters on the River Cam.

The local residents' association Brunswick & North Kite Residents Association, BruNK, (now dormant) also made representations to the city council regarding the common.

== Businesses on the Common ==
The Midsummer House restaurant, which currently holds 2 Michelin Stars, and the Fort St George public house are both on the riverside on the common.

== Panorama ==
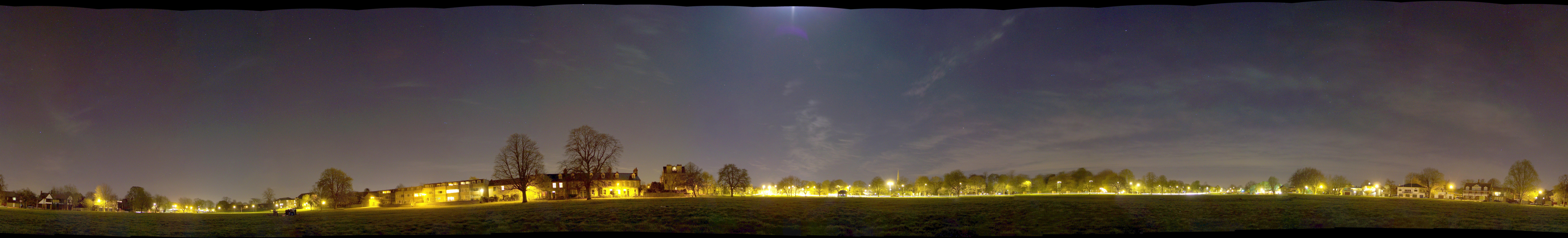
360° view of Midsummer Common by night

== See also ==
- Cambridge Beer Festival
- Charter fair
- Jesus Green
- List of Renaissance fairs
- Parker's Piece
- Town privileges
