= Chesterton Road, Cambridge =

Road in Cambridge

Coordinates: 52°12′47″N 0°07′11″E

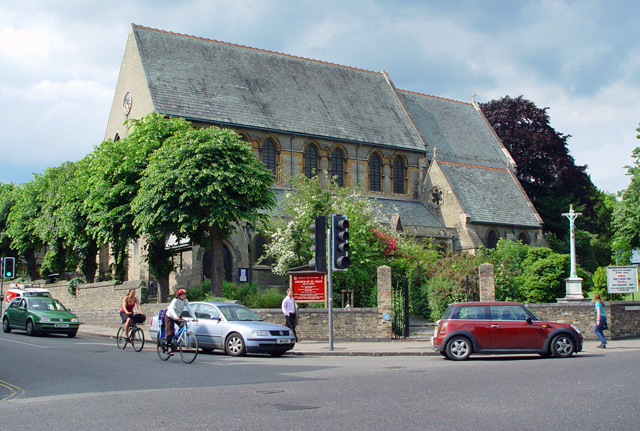
St Giles' Church at the southwestern end of Chesterton Lane

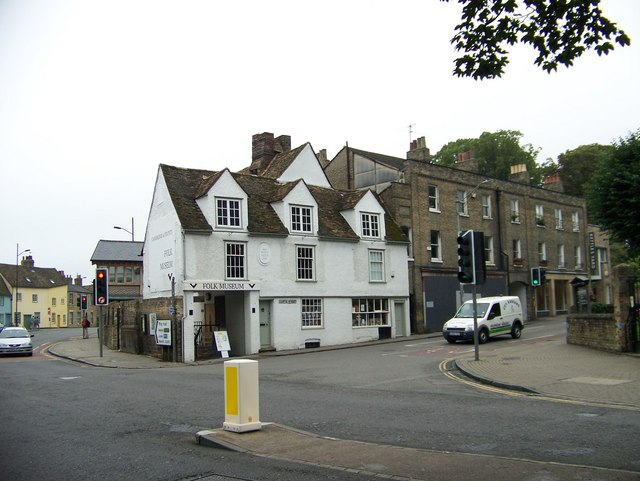
The Museum of Cambridge, viewed from the southwestern end of Chesterton Lane

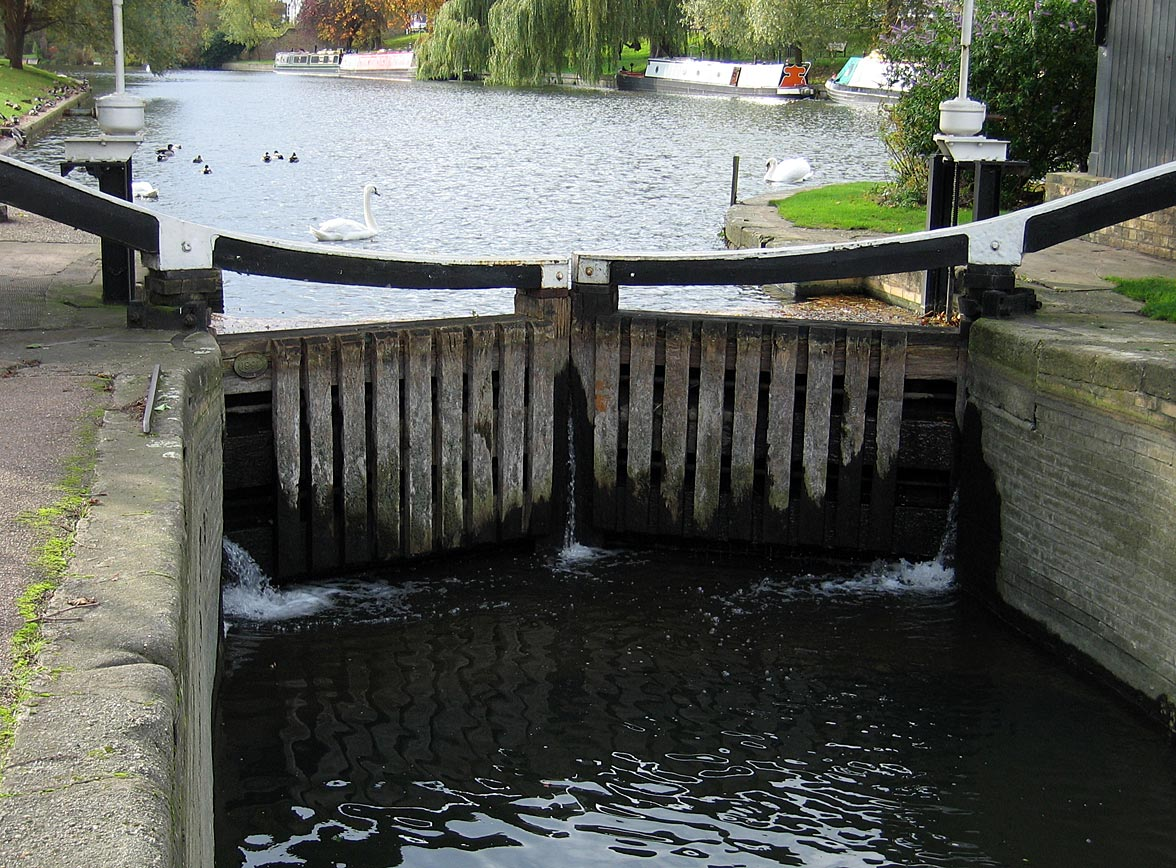
Jesus Lock, on the River Cam next to Chesterton Road

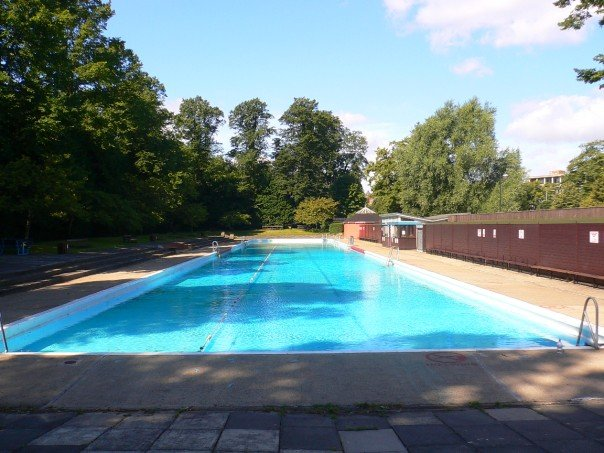
Jesus Green Swimming Pool, across the River Cam south of Chesterton Road

Chesterton Road (part of the A1303) is a road in the north of Cambridge, England.

In October 2000, archaeologists excavating a sewerage shaft at the corner of Chesterton Lane and Magdalene Street discovered a collection of 13th- and 14th-century coins lying in the remains of a disintegrated wooden box on the site of what was once a house. The hoard contained 1,805 silver pennies and nine gold coins.
