= River Cam =

River in Cambridgeshire, England

Cam
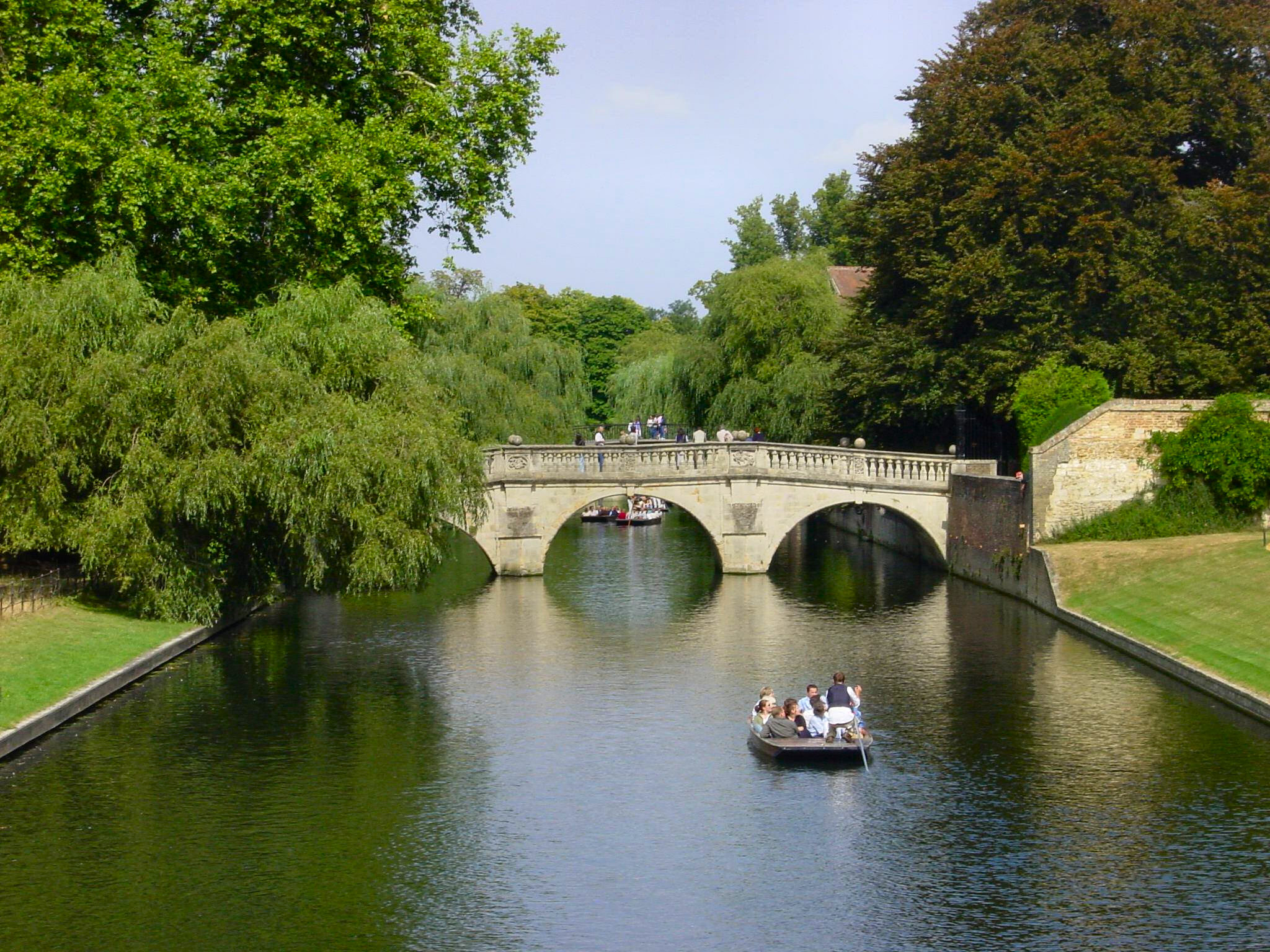
- View north towards Clare College bridge in Cambridge

Location
- Country: England
- County: Cambridgeshire

Physical characteristics
- Source
  - location: east of Widdington
  - coordinates: 51.95968°N 0.27138°E
  - elevation: 112 m (367 ft)
- Mouth: River Great Ouse
  - location: east of Stretham
  - coordinates: 52.3483°N 0.2525°E
  - elevation: 2 m (6 ft 7 in)
- Length: 71.319 km (44.316 mi)

Basin features
- River system: River Great Ouse
- Tributaries
  - left: Rhee, Bourn Brook
  - right: (small) Granta

The River Cam (/ˈkæm/) is a chalk river and the main river flowing through Cambridge in eastern England. After leaving Cambridge, it flows north and east before joining the River Great Ouse to the south of Ely, at Pope's Corner. The total distance from Cambridge to the sea is about 40 mi (64 km) and is navigable for punts, small boats, and rowing craft. The Great Ouse also connects to England's canal system via the Middle Level Navigations and the River Nene. In total, the Cam runs for around 69 kilometres (43 mi) from its furthest source (near Widdington in Essex) to its confluence with the Great Ouse.

== Name ==
The original name of the river was the Granta and (unusually) its present name derives from the city of Cambridge (Old English: Grantebrycge) rather than the other way around: After the city's present name developed in Middle English, the river's name was backformed to match. In earlier times even the lower part of the Cam was named the Granta, but after the name of the Anglo-Saxon town of Grantebrycge had been modified to Cambridge, the river was renamed to match. This was not universally applied, however, and the upper stretch of the river continues to be informally known as the Granta. It has been said that the river is the "Granta" above the Silver Street Bridge^{map 11} (in Cambridge) and the "Cam" below it. The confluence of River Rhee is about 4.7 km upstream of Silver Street bridge.

In the Ordnance Survey map, the Granta tributary is called "River Cam or Granta", and in the public environment database is the Cam. It has a small tributary named Granta, unequivocally.

The Rhee tributary, in the Ordnance Survey map is called "River Cam or Rhee".

== Minor tributary ==
Another minor tributary is Bourn Brook which has its source near the village of Eltisley, 10 mi (16 km) west of Cambridge, running east through Caxton, Bourn and Toft to join the Cam at Byron's Pool.

== The upper river ==
The upper course of the Cam starts near the village of Widdington in Essex, flowing north past Audley End House to merge with the other contributary Rhee, which is also commonly called River Cam, a mile south of Grantchester. From source to its confluence with the Rhee it is 41.7 kilometres (25.9 mi) in length, or according to Environment Data, 42.648 kilometres (26.500 mi).

== The lower river ==
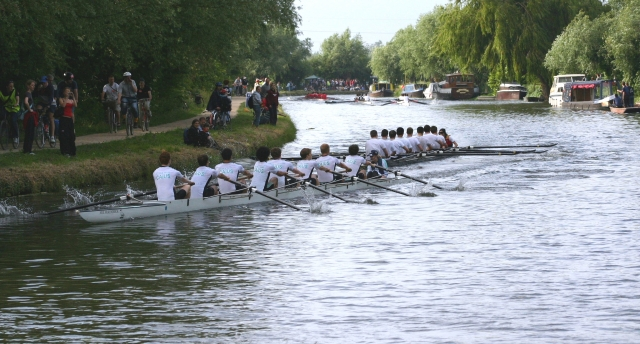
A Caius eight on the lower river about to be "bumped" by 1st & 3rd Trinity during the May Bumps rowing races 2005

The lower River from Hauxton Junction to the junction on the Ely Ouse has a length of 28.617 kilometres (17.782 mi).

An organisation called the Conservators of the River Cam was formed in 1702, charged with keeping the river navigable. The Conservators are responsible for the two locks in and north east of Cambridge: Jesus Lock^{map 7} and Baits Bite Lock.^{map 3} The stretch north (downstream) of Jesus Lock is sometimes called the lower river.

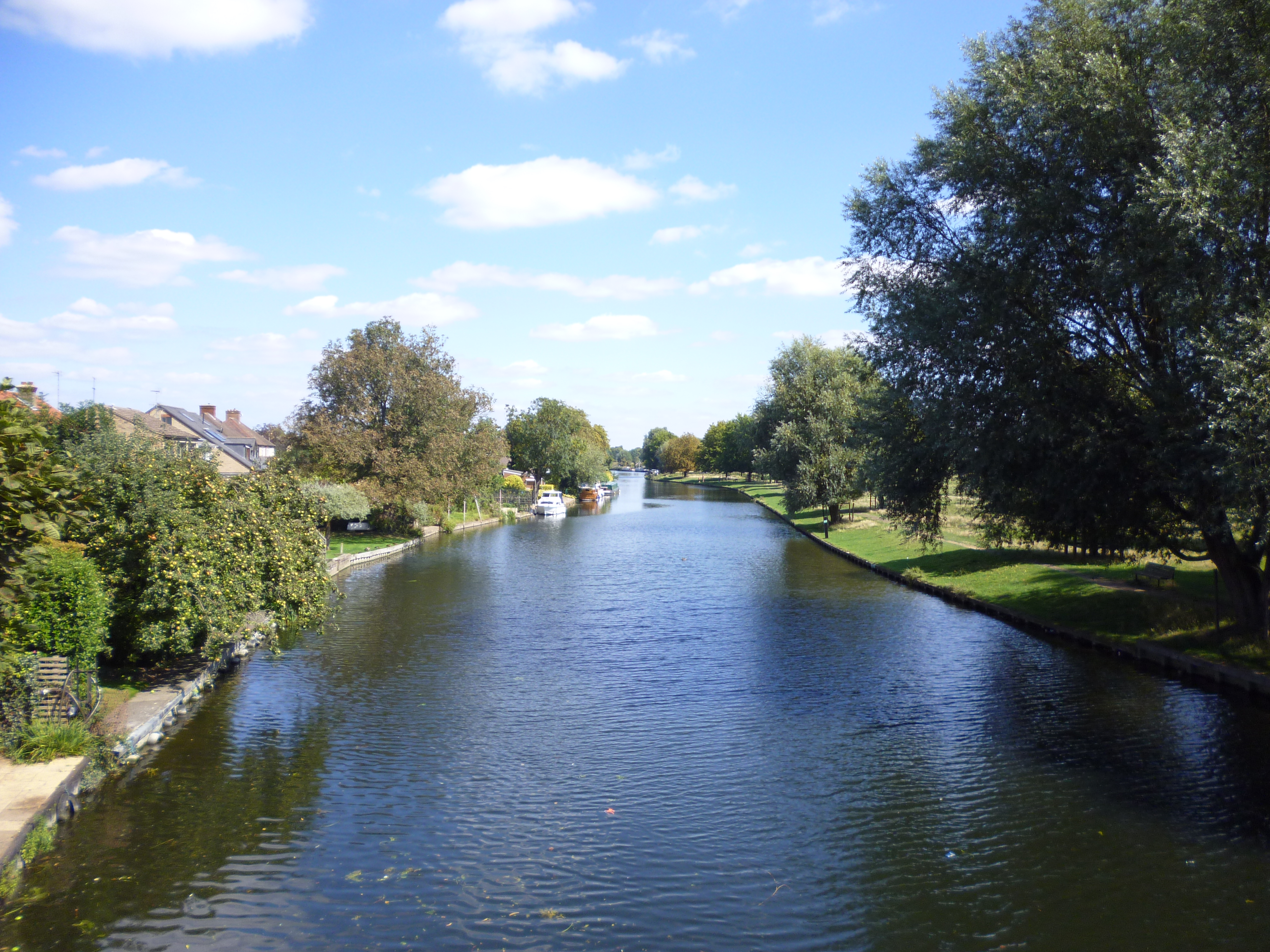
The River Cam flowing past Stourbridge Common

The stretch between Jesus Lock and Baits Bite Lock is much used for rowing. There are also many residential boats on this stretch, their occupants forming a community who call themselves the Camboaters.

Navigation on the lowest section of the Cam, below and including Bottisham Lock,^{map 2} is the responsibility of the Environment Agency.

== From Jesus Lock and the Backs to Grantchester (middle and upper river) ==
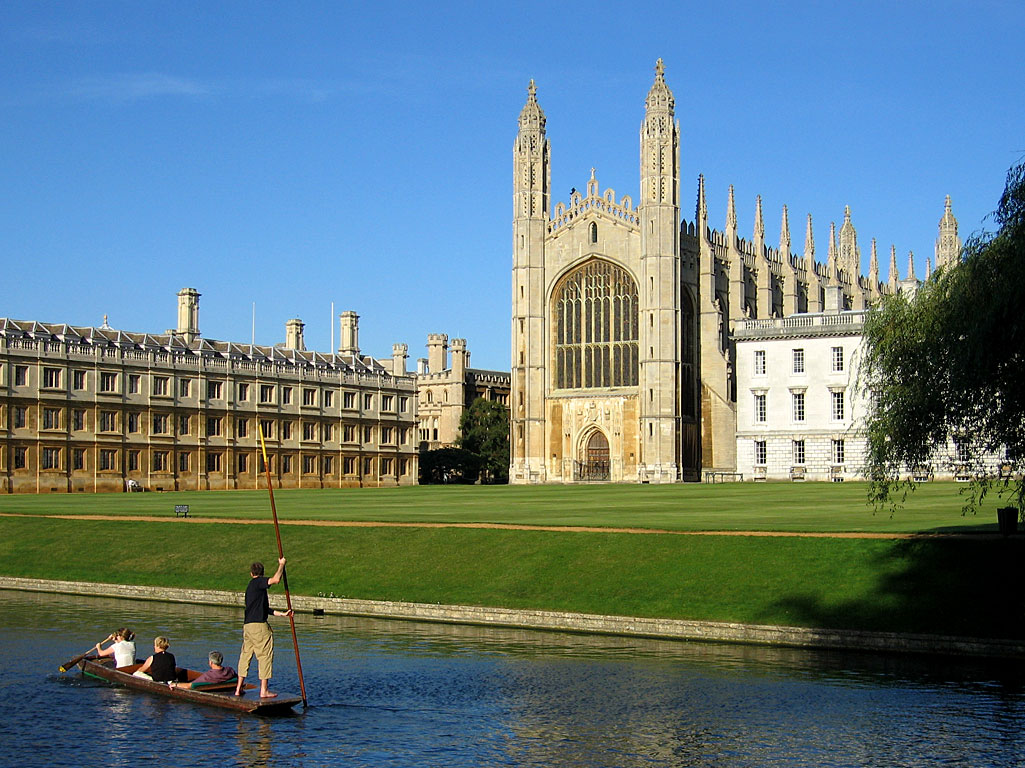
The Backs in Cambridge: King's College Chapel (centre) and Clare College (left)

The stretch above Jesus Lock is sometimes known as the middle river (with the section above the Mill Pond being referred to as the upper river). Between Jesus Lock and the Mill Pond,^{map 12} it passes through the Backs^{map 10} below the walls of many of the colleges. This is the section of river most popular with tourists, with its picture-postcard views of elegant bridges, green lawns and graceful willows. This stretch also has the unusual feature of the remains of a submerged towpath: the riverside colleges did not permit barge horses on the Backs, so the beasts waded up the Cam to the mill pulling their loads behind them.

Access for mechanically powered boats is prohibited above 'La Mimosa' Pub (at the upstream end^{map 8} of Jesus Green^{map 6}) between 1 April and 30 September, when the middle and upper river are open only to manually propelled craft. The most common of these are the flat-bottomed punts.

Between 1 October and 31 March powered boats are allowed as far as Mill Pool, but few people take advantage of this, as there are very few public mooring places along the Backs, and the river is too narrow and the bridges too low to afford easy passing or turning for many boats.

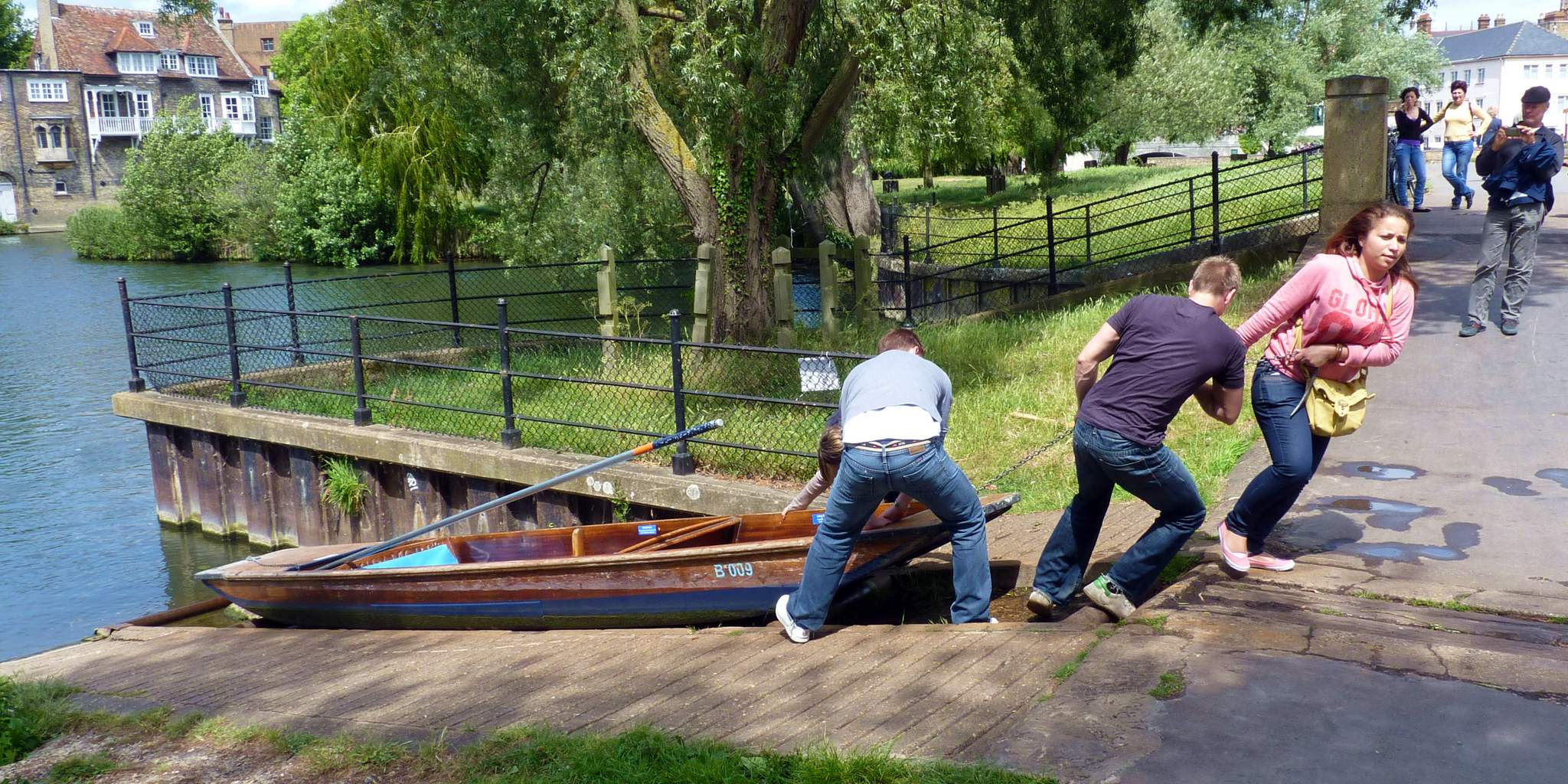
A punt being pulled up rollers on the slipway between the upper and lower levels of the River Cam near the Mill Pool.

Punts and canoes can be manhandled around the weir above the Mill Pool by means of the rollers, a slipway from lower to upper level. From the Mill Pool and its weir, the river can be followed upstream through Grantchester meadows to the village of Grantchester^{map 14} and Byron's Pool,^{map 15} where it is fed by many streams.

== Tributaries ==
The two principal tributaries of the Cam are the Granta and the Rhee, though both are also known as the Cam.

=== Rhee ===
The Rhee begins just off the High Street (Ashwell Springs), at Ashwell in Hertfordshire. Running north out of Ashwell, it forms the county boundary between Bedfordshire and Hertfordshire for around two kilometres, then the boundary between Bedfordshire and Cambridgeshire for a further kilometre. At this point its course turns east and from here until it merges with the Granta it forms the parish boundary between a succession of villages, though until it reaches Barrington it remains at a distance of around a kilometre from any settlement of any size.

Just after flowing under the Roman Ermine Street, it crosses the avenue of Wimpole Hall and a few kilometres later it receives the waters of the minor River Mel that runs through Meldreth. It runs along the southern edge of the village of Barrington, where it still powers a water mill known as Bulbeck Mill. At Harston it passes Harston Mill, the site of a water mill from at least the 11th century until the need for mills died out in the mid-20th century, and the parish church of All Saints. It then touches the eastern edge of the village of Haslingfield before joining the Granta at Hauxton Junction. From source to its confluence with the Granta it is 33.2 kilometres (20.6 mi) in length.

=== "Granta", upper course of the Cam ===
The Granta is the longer one and officially defined as the upper course of the Cam. The headwaters of the Cam start in the parish of Debden to the east of the village of Widdington in Essex. After initially running south west to descend from the hills of Uttlesford, it turns north just west of the village of Henham. From there until Great Shelford it largely follows the course of the West Anglia Main Line railway. Its northward journey passes first through Newport, where it is joined by the streams known as Wicken Water and Debden Water. A couple of miles later it forms a picturesque addition to views of the stately home as it flows past the front of Audley End House, and is also joined by the stream known as Fulfen Slade. It then skirts the edges of a number of villages as it moves into Cambridgeshire, successively Littlebury, Little Chesterford, Great Chesterford, Ickleton, Hinxton, Duxford and Whittlesford, powering a number of water mills along the way. Forming the boundary between Great Shelford and Little Shelford, it turns west to flow past Hauxton to merge with the Rhee a mile south of Grantchester at Hauxton Junction. From source to its confluence with the Rhee it is 41.7 kilometres (25.9 mi) in length.

=== Granta ===
The real Granta is a tributary of the upper Cam. It runs 10 mi (16 km) from south of Haverhill to join the Cam south of Great Shelford. Another minor tributary is Bourn Brook which has its source near the village of Eltisley, 10 mi (16 km) west of Cambridge, running east through Caxton, Bourn and Toft to join the Cam at Byron's Pool.

== Literature ==
"The Reeve's Tale" from Geoffrey Chaucer's Canterbury Tales begins:

At Trumpyngtoun, nat fer fro Cantebrigge,
Ther gooth a brook, and over that a brigge,
Upon the whiche brook ther stant a melle;
And this is verray sooth that I yow telle:
A millere was ther dwellynge many a day.

The mill formerly stood by Brasley Bridge on Grantchester Road. The mill pond is extant and the foundations of the mill can be seen when the water is low.

Byron's Pool is named after the poet, Lord Byron, who is reputed to have swum there. It was certainly a bathing place for Rupert Brooke and the Cambridge neo-Pagans. Brooke used to canoe from Cambridge to lodgings in Grantchester, which included the Old Vicarage. His homesick poem of 1912 evokes the river:

Oh! there the chestnuts, summer through,
Beside the river make for you
A tunnel of green gloom, and sleep
Deeply above; and green and deep
The stream mysterious glides beneath,
Green as a dream and deep as death.
...
To smell the thrilling-sweet and rotten
Unforgettable, unforgotten
River-smell, and hear the breeze
Sobbing in the little trees.
Say, do the elm-clumps greatly stand
Still guardians of that holy land?
The chestnuts shade, in reverend dream,
The yet unacademic stream?

— "The Old Vicarage, Grantchester", Collected Poems (1916)

One of Brooke's contemporaries, Gwen Darwin, later Raverat, grew up in the old mill by the Mill Pond. Her book, Period Piece, is a memoir of a childhood messing about on the river. The mill house is now part of Darwin College.

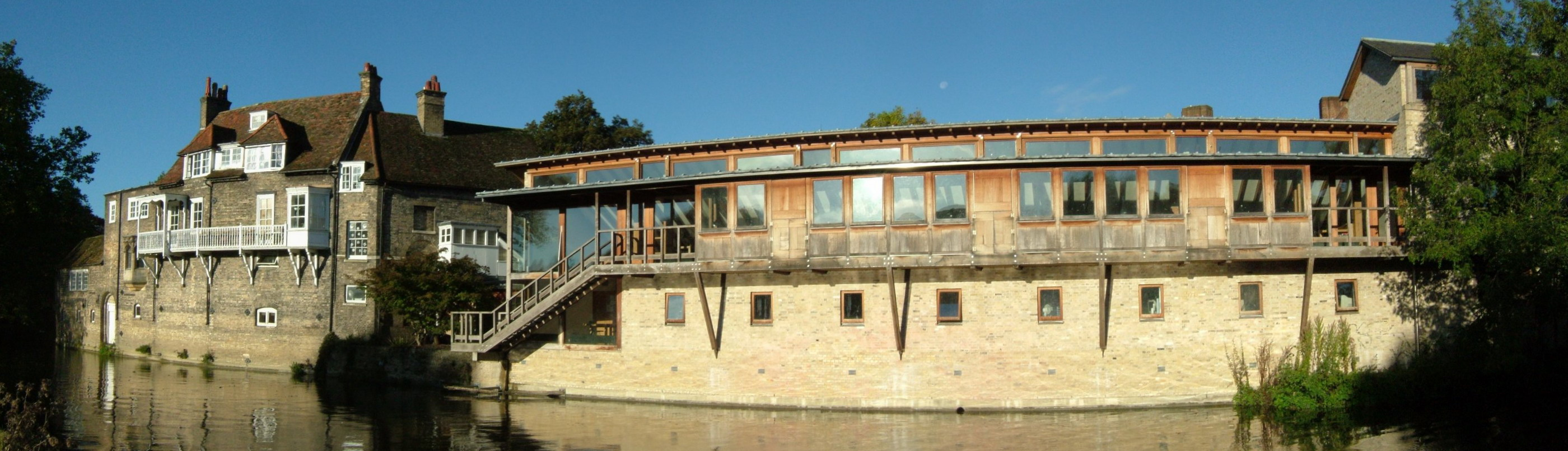
Darwin College seen across the Mill Pond

Children's author Philippa Pearce, who lived in Great Shelford until her death in December 2006, featured the Cam in her books, most notably Minnow on the Say. The river is renamed the River Say, with Great and Little Shelford becoming Great and Little Barley, and Cambridge becoming "Castleford" (not to be confused with the real town of the same name in West Yorkshire).

River Cam is referred to as "Camus, reverend Sire" in line 103 of John Milton's pastoral elegy Lycidas. Edward King, in whose memory the elegy was composed, was a fellow student at Cambridge.

== Use for recreation ==
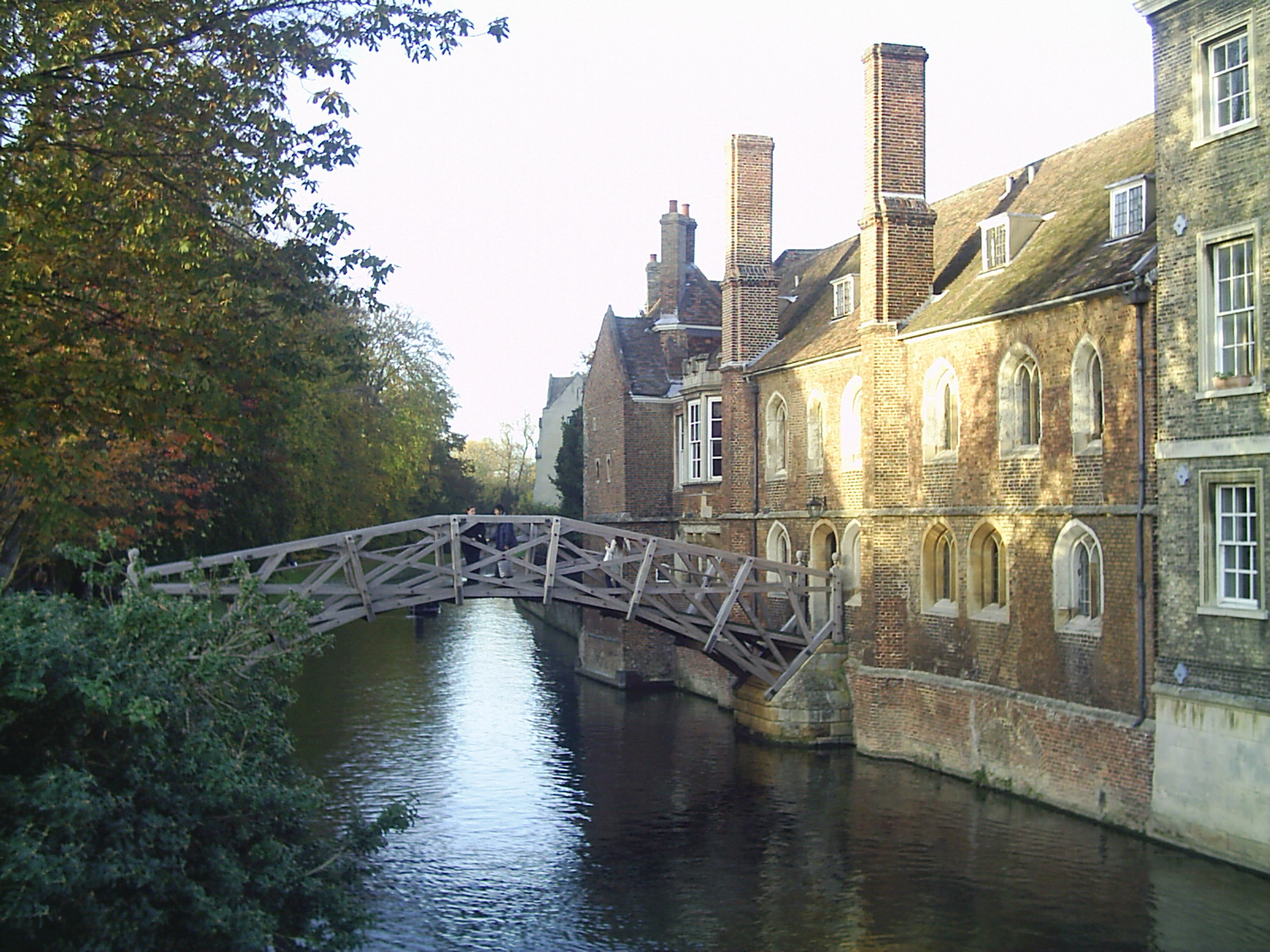
Mathematical Bridge connects Queens’ College with the President's Lodge at Cambridge.

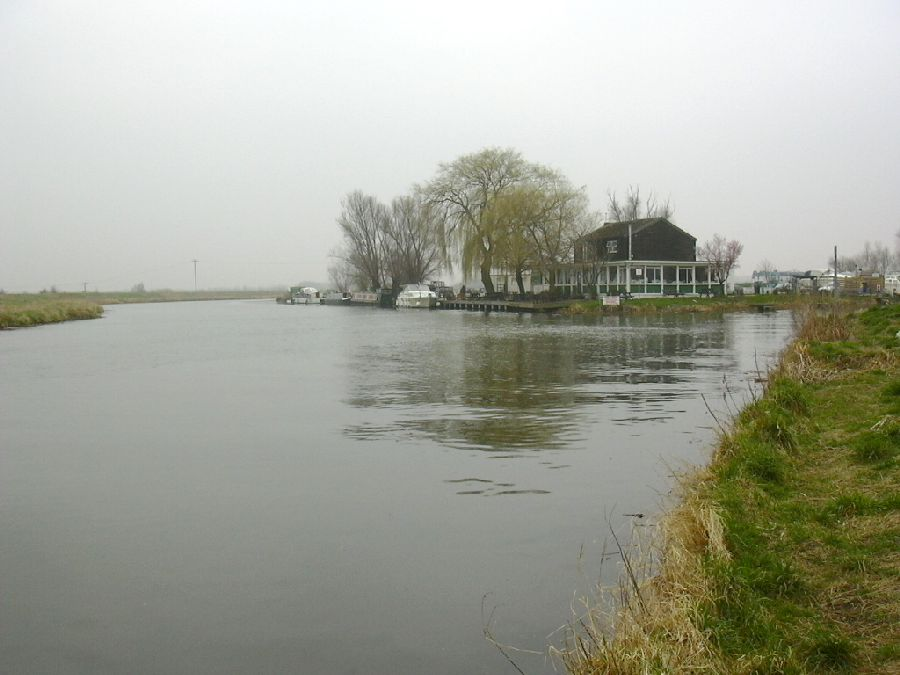
The confluence of the Cam (left) and the Great Ouse at Pope's Corner

Like many rivers, the Cam is extensively used for several forms of recreational activity. These include angling, swimming and various kinds of boating.

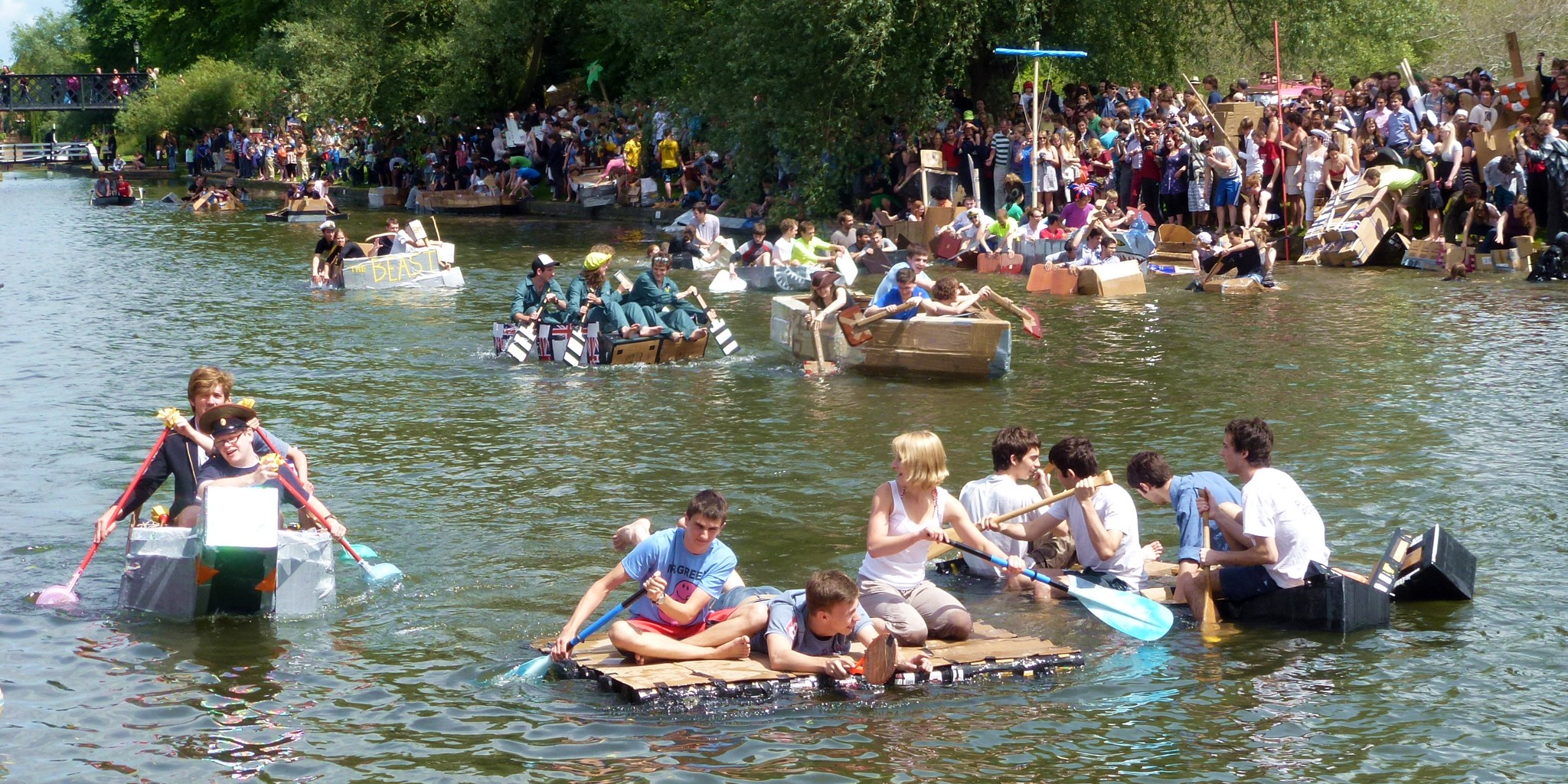
Some participants of the annual cardboard boat race on Suicide Sunday 2012.

=== Angling ===
The water is not murky and is clean enough from its source to its confluence with the Great Ouse to support fish. The fishing rights on the west bank are leased annually to the Cambridge Fish Preservation and Angling Society.

The Cam below Bottisham Sluice may still hold burbot, a fish thought to be extinct in English waters since the early 1970s. The last known burbot caught in Britain was in 1969, on the Cam, and in 2010 a fisherman reported spotting two in the Great Ouse.

Above Hinxton and Great Chesterford the river holds a stock of wild brown trout, though it is also stocked by the Audley Fly Fishers club and other angling societies who own the rights.

=== Boating ===
All boats using the river downstream of Mill Pond require a navigation licence from either the Conservators of the River Cam or the Environment Agency.

There are public moorings just below Jesus Lock on both sides of the river and on the western bank just north of the bridge at Clayhithe (both with a maximum stay of 48 hours), and unofficial moorings on the railings adjoining Riverside in Cambridge (unlimited stay, but usually fully occupied) which are under review by Cambridge City Council and likely to be reduced to eight or nine formalised residential moorings, or removed altogether. The moorings on the commons in Cambridge (Jesus Green, Midsummer Common^{map 5} and Stourbridge Common) are reserved by the City Council for holders of its long-term mooring permits. There are also some privately owned moorings.

There is a public slipway next to the garden of the Green Dragon pub in Water Street, Chesterton.^{map 4} This is occasionally used for launching small boats.

==== Punting ====
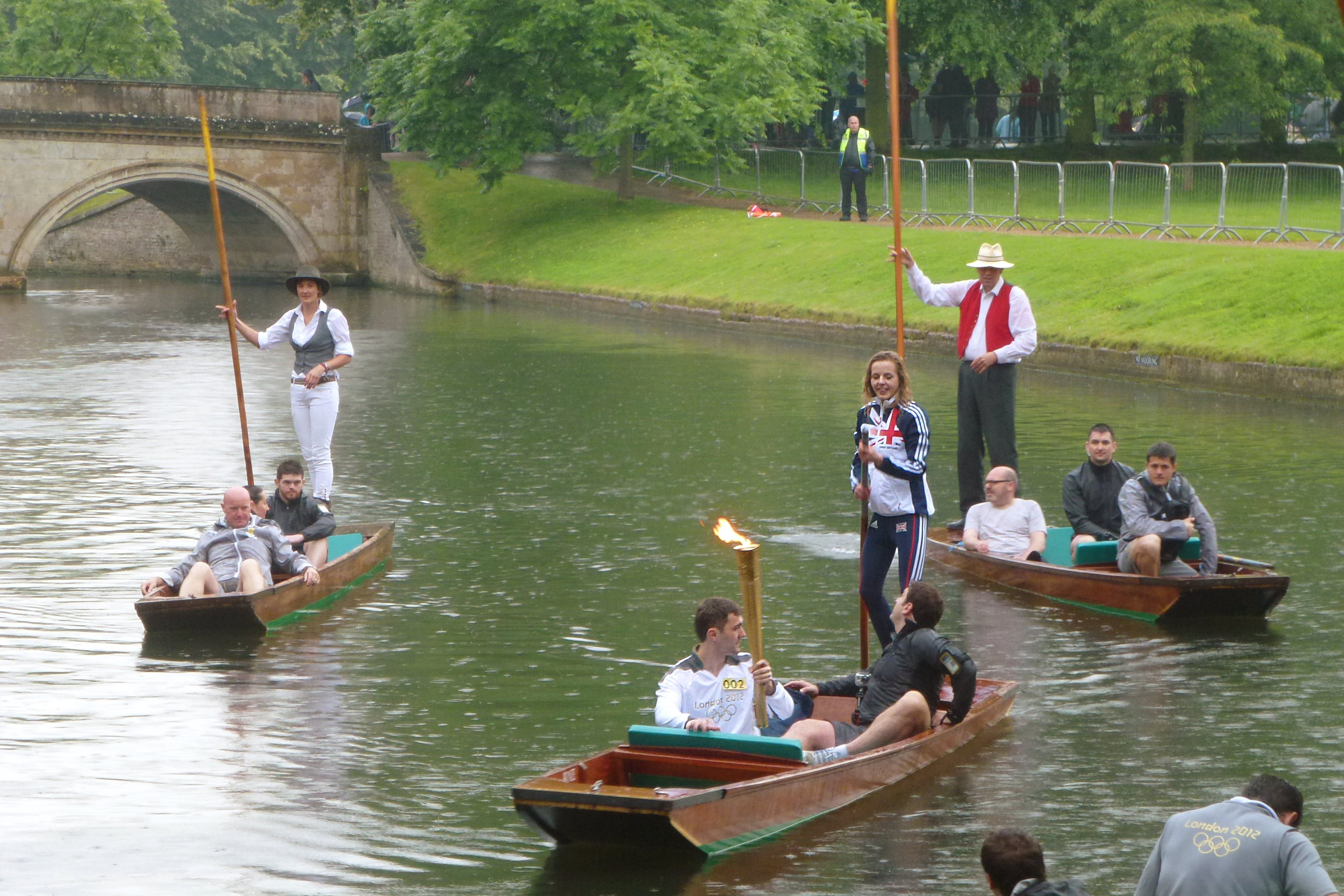
The Olympic torch punted down the Cam during the 2012 Summer Olympics torch relay

Punting is the most popular form of boating on the stretch of the river between Jesus Lock and Grantchester. Several of the colleges own punts, and they can also be hired from various companies, either with or without a person to operate them. The colleges and at least one private operator also own punts which are available for members of the public to travel on.

==== Canoeing ====
Canoeing and kayaking, both recreational and competitive, are popular at all times of year, especially on the section above the Mill Pond towards Grantchester. Both Cambridge Canoe Club (on Sheep's Green^{map 13}) and Cambridge University Canoe Club (just upstream from Newnham) are based here. Standup paddle boarding has also become popular.

==== Powered boating ====
Powered boats may navigate as far upstream as Byron’s Bear pub (next to Jesus Green) all year round, and as far as the Mill Pool between 1 October and 31 March.

==== Rowing ====
The lower river between Jesus Lock and Baits Bite Lock is the training and racing home of the Cambridge University Combined Boat Clubs' university and college, and the Cambridgeshire Rowing Association's town, rowing teams. The Cambridge Lent, May and Town Bumps rowing races, where boats set off at regular intervals, and the object is to catch and touch (that is, 'bump') the boat in front, are held here.

==== Sailing ====
The Cam Sailing Club was founded in 1899. It is based at Clayhithe near Waterbeach and organises sailing races most weekends between March and November.

=== Swimming ===
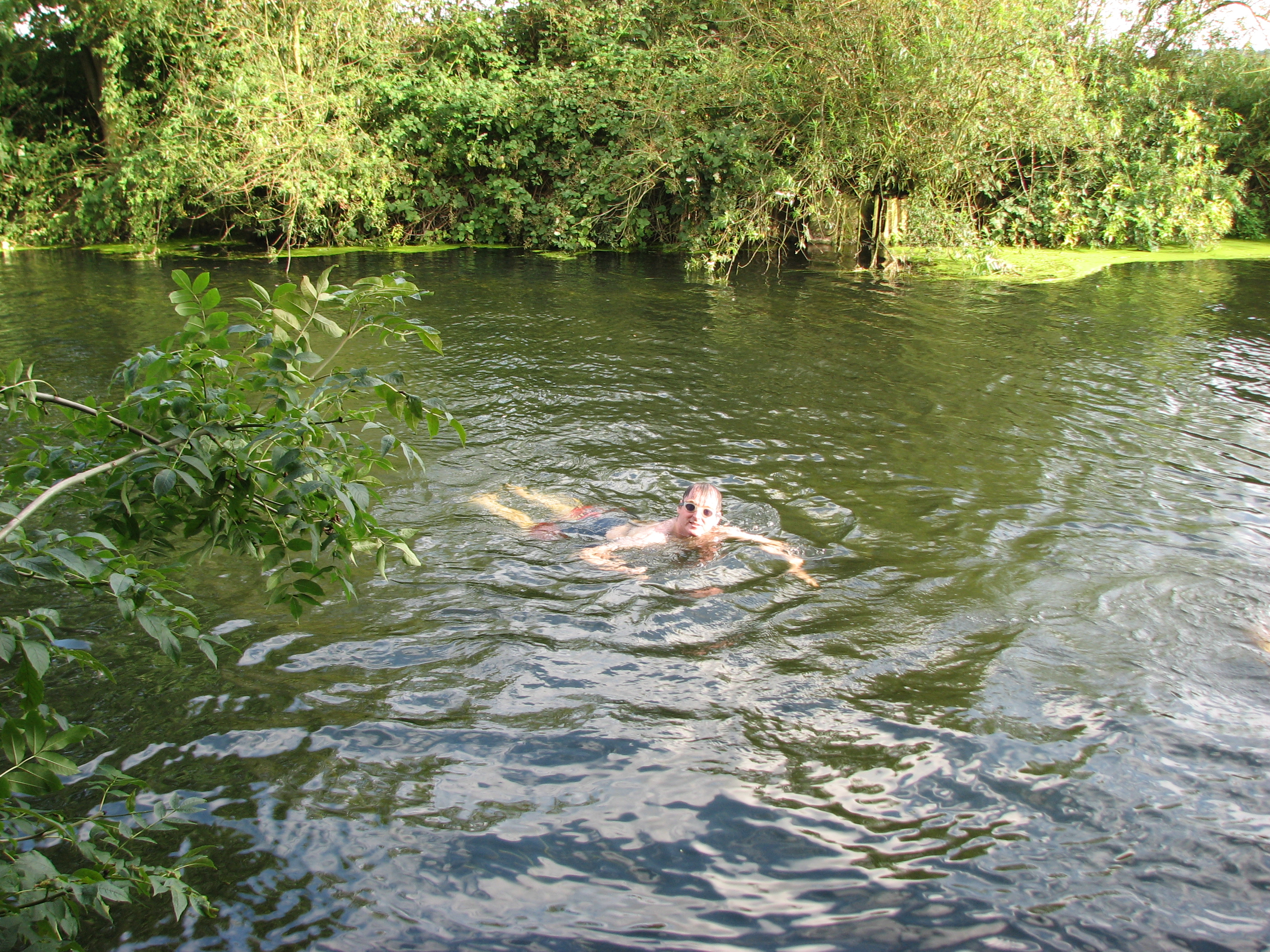
Swimming in the River Cam near Grantchester Meadows

Swimming on the upper reaches, between Byron's Pool and King's Mill Weir, is popular in the summer, and people bathe at Grantchester Meadows all year round. Hardy bathers take part in the New Year's Day swim.

== Navigation ==
Cambridge had been an inland port due to its location on the River Cam prior to the draining of the Fens. As the university colleges rose in importance, the course of the river through the town, known as the Backs, was moved further to the east to accommodate their new buildings. A report conducted in 1618 by Richard Atkyns highlighted the problems caused by sandbanks above Clayhithe and watermills obstructing navigation. An order made by the parliamentary committee of the association in 1643 regulated use of the river for trade, but the biggest change was the construction of Denver Sluice on the River Great Ouse, which reduced river levels on the lower river as tidal waters were excluded from the Ouse. Both the university and the Corporation of Cambridge complained to Parliament in 1697 that the trade route to the town from King's Lynn had been severely impaired.

In 1699, the corporation sought to obtain an act of Parliament which would allow them to improve the river from Clayhithe to Queens Mill at Cambridge. The River Cam Navigation Act 1702 (1 Ann. St. 2. c. 11) was obtained on 27 February 1702 and created the Conservators of the River Cam, a legal body with authority to charge tolls for use of the river, which ranged from four shillings (20p) a ton for wine to one penny (0.4p) per person for passengers. The conservators, of which there were a maximum of eleven, had powers to mortgage the tolls, in order to raise capital for improvements to the river immediately. This they did, and built sluices at Jesus Green, Chesterton, Baits Bite and Clayhithe. Most of the tolls were collected at Clayhithe.

Prior to 1722, Denver sluice had been destroyed, and although Cambridge Corporation opposed its reconstruction, it was rebuilt by 1750. The river entered a period of steady profitability, with toll receipts rising from £432 in 1752 to over £1,000 by 1803. In 1835 they peaked at £1,995, and then declined slightly until 1846. The conservators also raised some revenue from rents on the public houses which they owned adjacent to each of the sluices. Another act of Parliament, the River Cam Navigation Act 1813 (53 Geo. 3. c. ccxiv), was obtained on 21 July 1813 which allowed the conservators to alter the tolls and charge penalties, while the South Level Act 1827 (7 & 8 Geo. 4. c. xlvii) created commissioners who had responsibility for the river below Bottisham. This act also appointed the vice-chancellor of the university and the mayor as navigation commissioners. The conservators built locks at Baits Bite and Bottisham, and removed the sluice at Chesterton.

The river was sufficiently profitable that the conservators were able to contribute £400 towards the cost of rebuilding the Great Bridge, now called the Magdalene Bridge,^{map 9} in 1823, and a further £300 for the rebuilding of the Small Bridge, now Silver Street Bridge, in 1841. A year later they constructed a house at Clayhithe, which cost £880, and included a large room for meetings and banquets. Just three years later the Eastern Counties Railway reached Cambridge, and the navigation declined rapidly. Receipts dropped from £1,393 in 1846 to £367 in 1850, and were just £99 in 1898. Most commercial carrying on the river had stopped by World War I, although Banhams operated two steam tugs and three barges until the late 1930s, carrying gas water from Cambridge Gasworks to King's Lynn, where it was used in the manufacture of fertiliser. The last recorded passenger services had ceased nearly 100 years earlier, in 1839 and were started again in 2008 with the passenger vessel moored on Jesus Green.

Traffic using the river today consists of private cruisers making the journey to Jesus Lock, with the section above Baits Bite lock regularly in use by the University rowing clubs, both for practice and for races. Motorised craft can navigate along the Backs in winter, but headroom is severely restricted. The Conservators of the River Cam now have an office in the former lock-keepers cottage at Baits Bite, while the house at Clayhithe is now the residence of the foreman of the conservators. The conservators are still responsible for the river above Bottisham lock, while the lower river has been managed by the Environment Agency since its creation in 1995.

The three locks are all of different sizes. Bottisham and Baits Bite locks are both fully automated, with a vertical guillotine gate at the upstream end and traditional mitre gates at the downstream end. Jesus lock is manually operated, and has mitre gates at both ends. Boat sizes are restricted to 96.8 ft (29.5 m) by the length of Bottisham lock, and to 14 ft (4.3 m) by the width of Baits Bite lock. Jesus lock is only 9.7 ft (3.0 m) wide. The navigable lodes of Reach, Swaffham Bulbeck and Bottisham, the last of which is no longer navigable, can be reached from the River Cam.

== Flooding ==
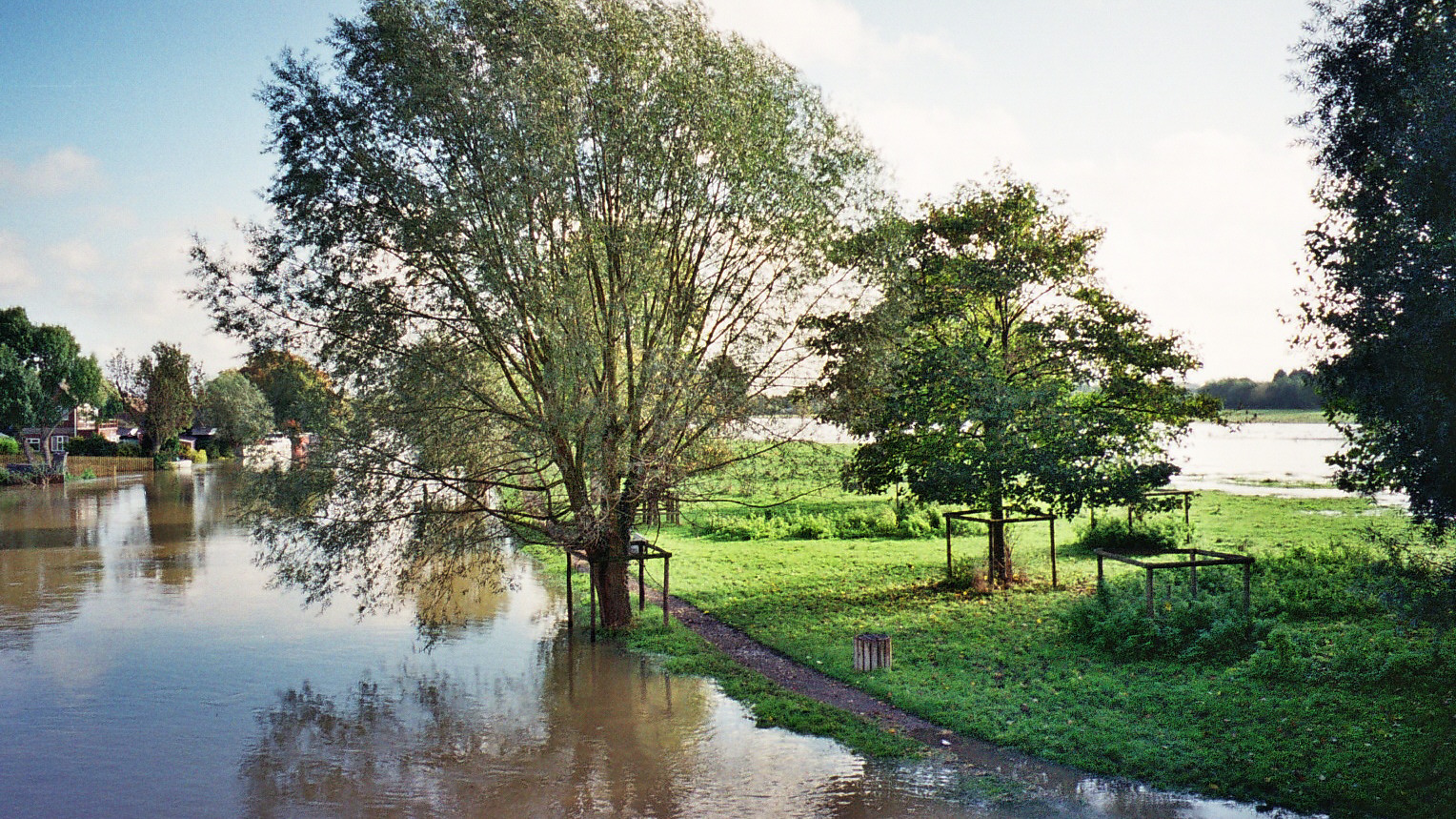
The Cam (left) flooding parts of Stourbridge Common (right), 23 October 2001. Looking east from Green Dragon Bridge.

The Cam is normally a placid river but flooding does occasionally happen. The most recent serious floods were in 2001, first in February and again on 22–23 October, and then in February 2009.

The Environment Agency is responsible for managing water levels and issuing flood warnings for the entire river.

== Water resources ==
Concerns have been raised about the abstraction of groundwater from the Chalk aquifer in the upper reaches of the Cam and the resulting impact on water levels and the chalk streams which feed its tributaries. In the 1990's, in an effort to mitigate the impact of reduced summer flows, the Environment Agency established a 'groundwater support system' which involved pumping water from the aquifer and feeding it into the river system at various points, which in some cases involve underground pipelines several miles long.

== See also ==
- List of bridges in Cambridge
- Jesus Green Swimming Pool
- List of rivers of the United Kingdom

== Maps ==
- ^map 1Pope's Corner, 52°20′53.79″N 000°15′09.04″E
- ^map 2Bottisham Lock, 52°16′7″N 0°12′32″E
- ^map 3Baits Bite Lock, 52°14′11″N 0°10′28″E
- ^map 4Chesterton, 52°13′02.50″N 000°08′44.50″E
- ^map 5Midsummer Common, 52°12′36.61″N 000°07′54.67″E
- ^map 6Jesus Green, 52°12′47.67″N 000°07′23.12″E
- ^map 7Jesus Lock, 52°12′46″N 0°7′15″E
- ^map 8Upstream end of Jesus Green, 52°12′36.49″N 000°07′00.98″E
- ^map 9River Cam at Cambridge, near Magdalene College, 52°12′35.42″N 000°06′59.39″E
- ^map 10The Backs, 52°12′15.73″N 000°06′50.54″E
- ^map 11Silver Street Bridge, 52°12′06.77″N 000°06′55.27″E
- ^map 12Mill Pond, 52°12′05.75″N 000°06′55.87″E
- ^map 13Sheep's Green, 52°11′45.7″N 000°07′00.0″E
- ^map 14Grantchester, 52°10′44.04″N 000°05′42.00″E
- ^map 15Byron's Pool, 52°10′16.20″N 000°05′53.83″E
