= Jesus Lane =

Street in central Cambridge, England

Coordinates: 52.2086°N 0.1219°E

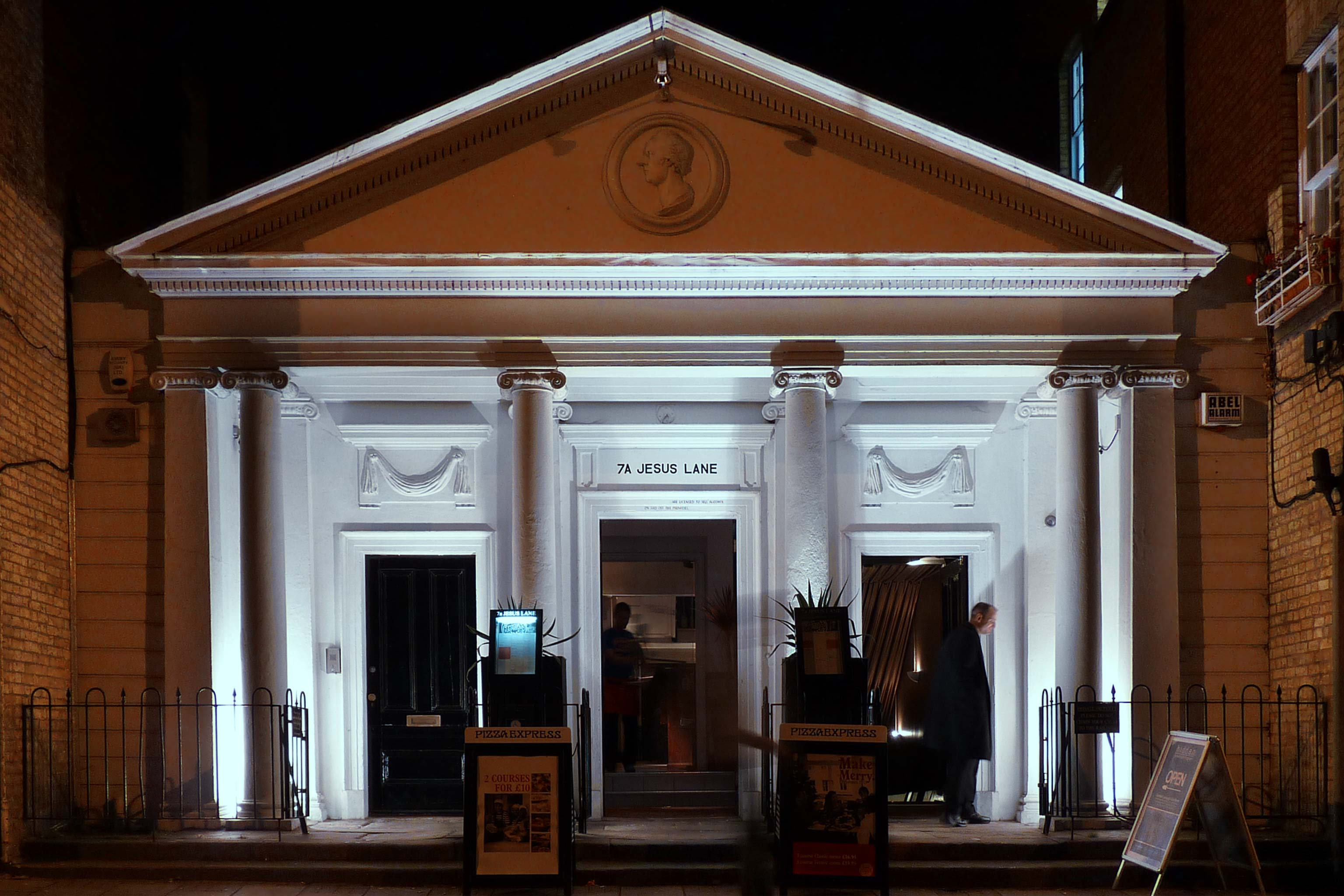
The facade of the Pitt Club.

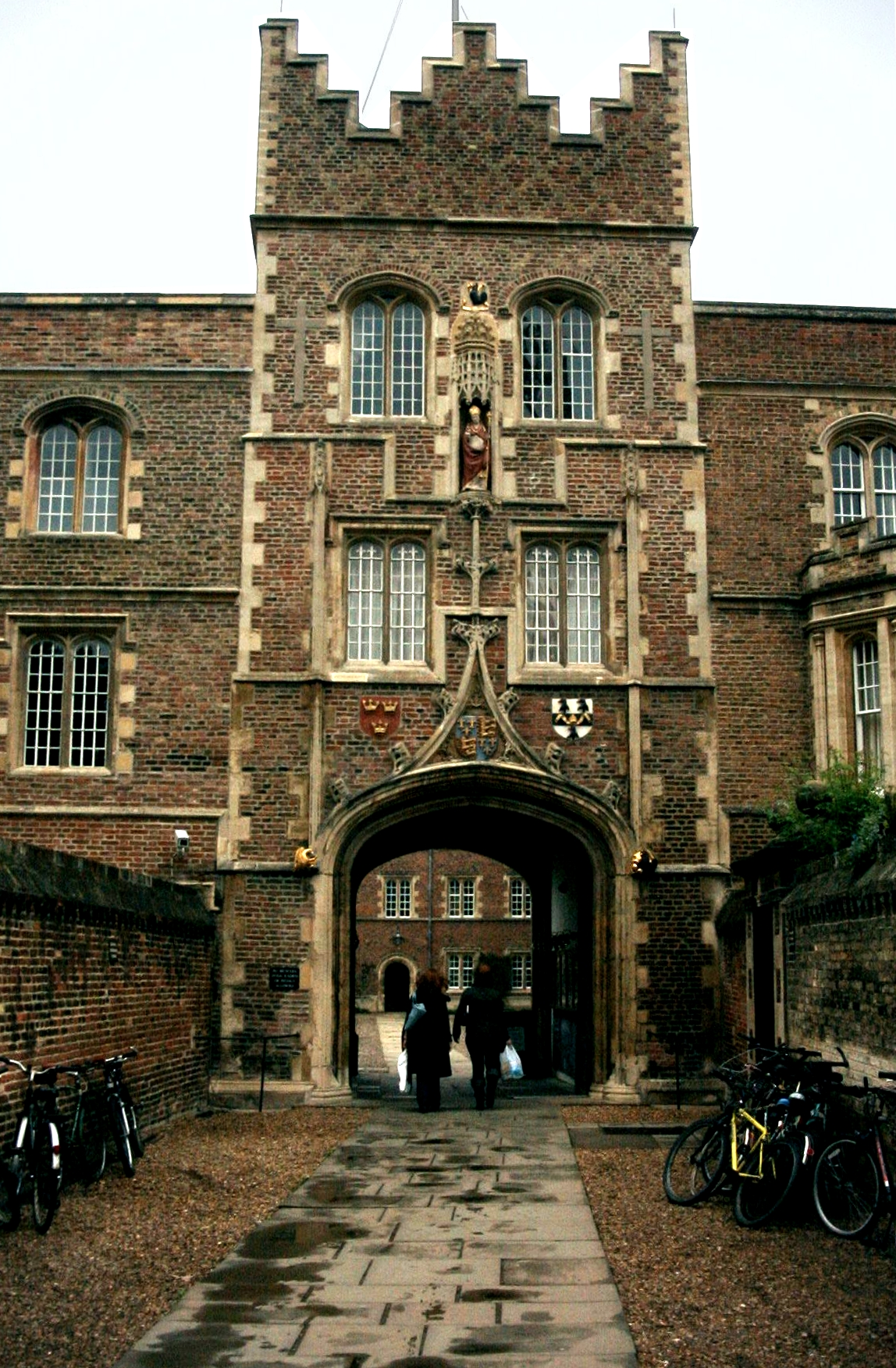
The main entrance of Jesus College, on Jesus Lane.

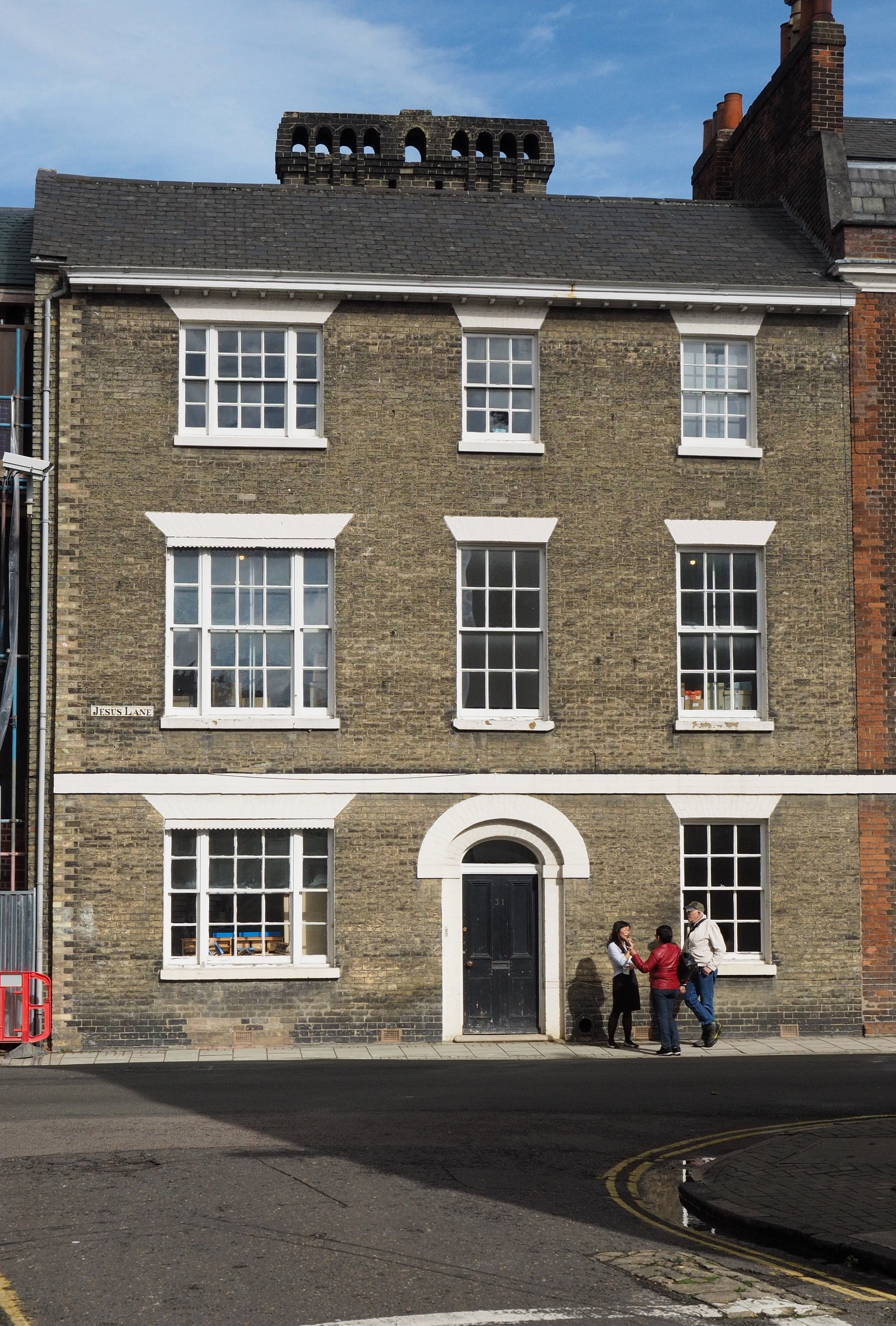
31, Jesus Lane

Jesus Lane is a street in central Cambridge, England. The street links with the junction of Bridge Street and Sidney Street to the west. To the east is a roundabout. To the south is King Street, running parallel with Jesus Lane and linking at the roundabout. The road continues east as Maid's Causeway and then Newmarket Road east out of Cambridge. To the north is Victoria Avenue between Jesus Green to the west and Midsummer Common to the east. Also to the north near the western end is Park Street, location of the ADC Theatre. To the south is Short Street, quickly leading into Emmanuel Road past Christ's Pieces.

Jesus Lane is an ancient route, formerly called Nunnes Lane, that gave access to the Nunnery of St Mary and St Radegund on which Jesus College, Cambridge is founded. It crossed the King's Ditch. Little Trinity on the lane is one of the best domestic buildings in Cambridge, alongside 49 Jesus Lane. Jesus College is located on the north side of the street, and gives the street its name. Sidney Sussex College is to the south of Jesus Lane on the western end, fronting onto Sidney Street.

Jesus Lane Friends Meeting House was established here on land donated by Anne Docwra in 1700. Also located on Jesus Lane are Wesley House, Methodist theological college (or seminary), on the north side and Westcott House, a Church of England theological college, on the south side. A mediaeval church, All Saints Jewry, originally stood in St John's Street, to the west of Jesus Lane. It was rebuilt in 1820 and then demolished in 1865. All Saints, designed by the Victorian architect G. F. Bodley and built 1863–70, is now located in Jesus Lane. It is one of the best examples of Victorian churches in the area.

The University Pitt Club, a University of Cambridge club, has premises at 7a Jesus Lane. The neoclassical building was originally designed as Victorian Roman Baths in 1863 by Sir Matthew Digby Wyatt who later bought it, and rented part of it back to the club. Later, the club bought the entire building, and for much of the 20th century. In October 1997, the club sold a 25-year leasehold on the ground floor of its building to the Pizza Express chain. Since then, the club has the first floor of the building.
