= St Radegund, Cambridge =

Pub in King Street, Cambridge, England

Coordinates: 52.207676°N 0.126801°E

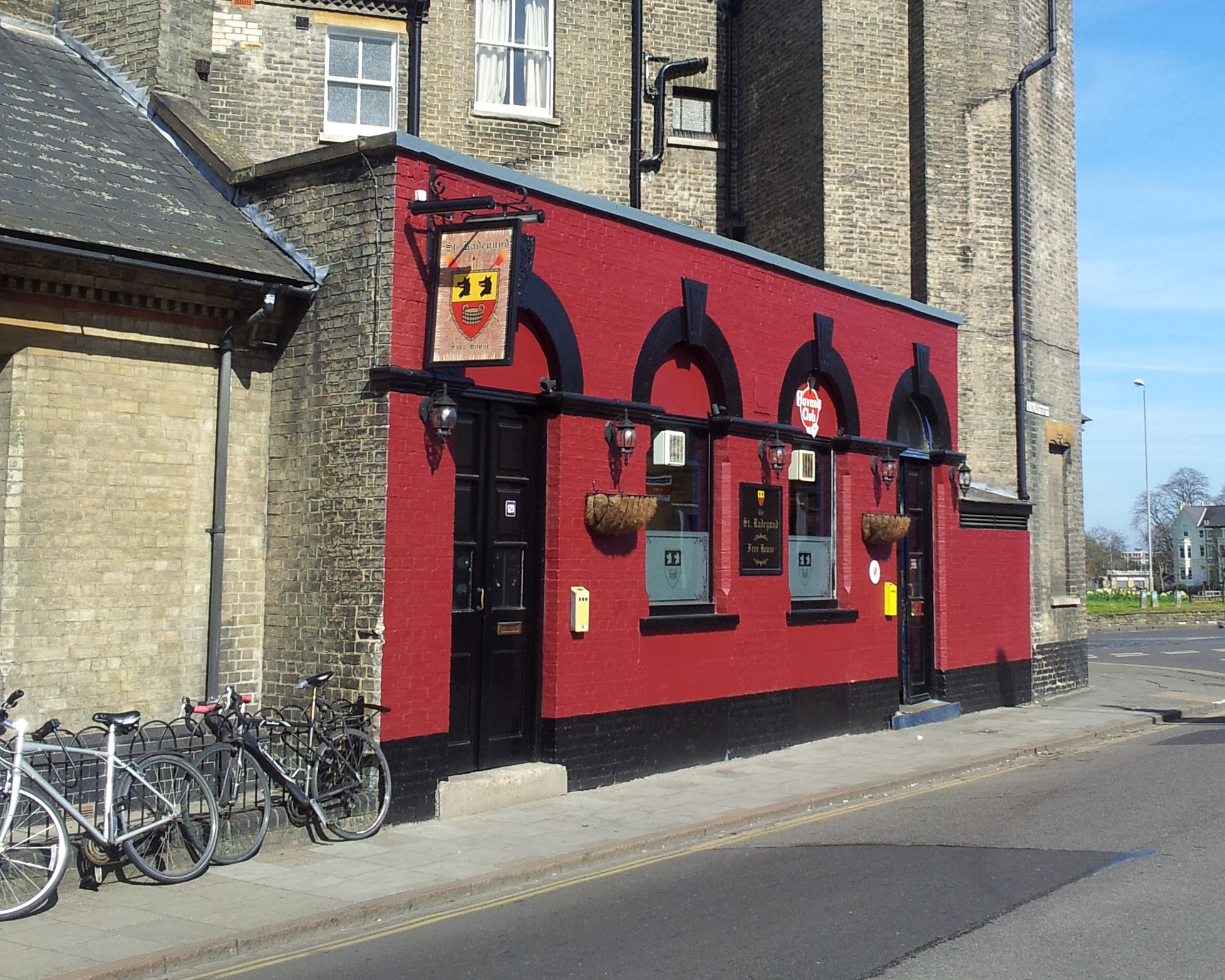
The St Radegund public house with the old sign (not new sign) Jesus Green can be seen in the background

St Radegund is a pub in King Street, Cambridge, England. It is named after St Radegund, a Frankish saint associated with the nearby Jesus College. With a single saloon bar of just over 20 square metres (220 sq ft), it is popularly believed to be the smallest pub in Cambridge.

== Overview ==
The pub was the home to the Cantabrigensis Hash House Harriers between 1993 and 2017, a rowing club and a cricket team. It was the start/finish venue on the legendary King Street Run. All of these activities and more were encouraged (and in the case of the cricket team, started) by Terry Kavanagh (1937-2012), who was landlord between 1992 and 2009.

Since 1992 the St Radegund has played an annual cricket match against The Champion of the Thames, for the King Street Trophy.

In 2008, the saga of the 2003 St Radegund cricket tour to Croatia, The Ascent of Mount Hum, was published, to critical acclaim.

Friday night is Vera Lynn Appreciation Society night when large amounts of gin and tonics were served along with to Vera Lynn’s songs.

In 2007, it was pointed out that the pub sign depicted the arms of the Austrian municipality, Sankt Radegund bei Graz rather than the saint herself. A local artist was commissioned to correct the mistake and the story attracted media comment. In 2010, the new landlord, James Hoskins, reverted to a design incorporating the former (incorrect) arms. In early 2015 the premises underwent a programme of refurbishment and redecoration after which it became a pub tied to the Saffron Brewery, ceasing to serve Habit and Sackcloth, beers specially brewed for the pub by Milton Brewery.

It was closed under notice of forfeiture in August 2019. In 2020 Cold Chain Bars obtained the lease and the pub reopened in March 2024 before closing again in October of the same year. It re-opened again in January 2026, promising a return to former standing as a community hub. (

== See also ==
- St Radegund's Priory, Cambridge
