= Jan Willem Ter Braak =

Dutch espionage agent working for Germany

Engelbertus Fukken Jan Willem Ter Braak
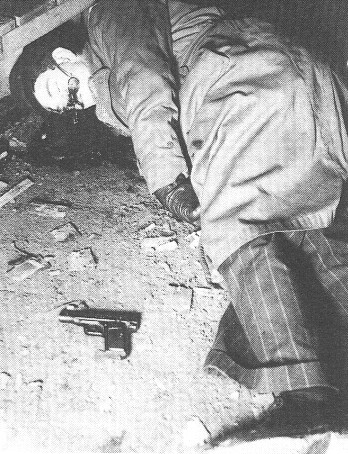
- The body of Braak (1941)
- Born: 28 August 1914; The Hague, Netherlands
- Died: 31 March 1941 (aged 26); Christ's Pieces, Cambridge, England
- Burial place: Great Shelford village Cemetery
- Occupations: Insurance Agent, Journalist
- Espionage activity
- Allegiance: Germany
- Service years: 1940–1941
- Codename: Jan Willem Ter Braak

Jan Willem Ter Braak (28 August 1914 – 30/31 March 1941) was a Dutch espionage agent working for Germany who operated for five months in the United Kingdom. Ter Braak, whose original name was Engelbertus Fukken, is believed to have been the German agent who was at large for the longest time in Britain during the Second World War, despite his short period of activity. When he ran out of money, Ter Braak committed suicide in a public air raid shelter.

== Youth ==
Engelbertus Fukken was born on 28 August 1914, in The Hague (Van Boetzelaerlaan 140). His parents were Willem Briedé (born 1865 in Amsterdam) and Elizabeth Johanna Fukken (born 1886 in Rotterdam), who were not married because Willem's first wife refused to divorce him. In the end he had three brothers and three sisters. His father was a trader in cereals and later became an accountant. The family moved in 1917 to Noordwijk aan Zee, where they rented a villa at Duinweg 7. His mother died in 1920 of her eighth pregnancy.

Engelbertus Fukken went to the Zeevaartschool in The Hague in 1930. He was interested in politics and became a supporter of Nazi Party of Adolf Hitler (NSDAP), which came to power in 1933. In 1934 he became member of the Dutch National Socialist Movement (NSB).

His father died in December 1934 and he had to start working for his money. He got a job as an insurance agent in The Hague but after half a year he did not pay the customer's premiums to his employer and was arrested for fraud. He received a sentence of three months. After that he worked as a journalist with the weekly Noordwijker paper and probably also Leidsch Dagblad (a newspaper from the city of Leiden) but in 1937 he had to return to jail for six months because he had not fulfilled his obligatory duties towards the Reclassification authorities. He was thrown out of the NSB and became unemployed. He lived in several rooms in Noordwijk.

In 1939, he met a young woman who became his fiancée, and was then financially supported by her family.

== Recruitment by the Abwehr ==
In May/June 1940 Holland, Belgium and France were occupied by the Germans. In July 1940 the Hitler regime decided to send spies to England to prepare for the invasion (Operation Sea Lion), which was planned for September. The Abwehr office (Ast) Hamburg (Herbert Wichmann and Nikolaus Ritter) became responsible for this so-called Operation Lena, in cooperation with Ast Brussels, especially for the spies who would land by boat on the shore of England.

Rittmeister Kurt Mirow from Ast Brussels went to Holland to recruit spies. After having found three spies in Amsterdam, he travelled to The Hague and Noordwijk aan Zee around 25 July. In Noordwijk he had a good relation: Dieter Tappenbeck (1912), who was a cousin of Rudolf Tappenbeck, the director of the famous Grand Hotel Huis ter Duin. Dieter, who'd worked for the Dutch Press Office, was an active supporter of Nazism who was employed by one of the German Ministries in Berlin. But in July/August he was back in the Netherlands for propaganda work in the Reichskommissariat of Seyss Inquart in The Hague.

He suggested to Mirow that he ask his old friend Engelbertus Fukken to become a Lena-spy. (As children Dieter and Engelbertus had been pupils at the same school in Noordwijk.) Mirow did so, Fukken happily agreed and was turned into Jan Willem ter Braak. He chose this forename due to his admiration for chief editor Jan Willem Henny of the Leidsch Dagblad. The last name he cynically derived from the famous journalist Menno ter Braak, who published many articles against Nazi policies.

Ter Braak left Noordwijk and his fiancée on 1 August, came back on 12 August for a few hours to say goodbye and to give a present to his fiancée, and then disappeared to "go to France for work" as he told her. It is not clear where he was trained as a spy, although it is believed to have been Germany (Berlin and Hamburg). After his death, MI5 found boots and some of his clothes which were bought in Brussels, which would signify he stayed there for a while.

== Arrival ==
Ter Braak arrived by parachute on a night between 31 October and 2 November 1940, landing near Haversham in Buckinghamshire. His parachute was discovered on 3 November but Ter Braak was not found. He had in fact made his way to Cambridge, where he arrived on 4 November.

It is not clear where he stayed in the few days after his arrival in England. In Cambridge he found lodgings with a couple named Sennitt at 58 St. Barnabas Road, who accepted his story of having come from the Netherlands during the Dunkirk evacuation, having lived after that in two other places in Southern England. He claimed to be working with Free Dutch forces in London on a Dutch newspaper.

== Activities ==
Despite his false identity papers, Ter Braak was able to rent an office above the property renting firm Haslop & Co in Green Street. As an alien from an occupied country, Ter Braak's residence should have been registered with the police, but it was not. His landlord did tip the Aliens Officer off that a Dutch national was living with him, but the police did not follow up and speak to him, saying that they were sure he would register before long. He spent most of the day out of the house but never spent a night away, and supported himself from a large amount of cash which he had brought with him and which included US dollars.

He left his office in December 1940. He had installed his suitcase transmitter in his room in St Barnabas Road but around Christmas the batteries had been running down, so since then he could only communicate with the Abwehr in Hamburg by letters, written with invisible ink.

He made daytrips by bus or train to small cities in the neighbourhood, such as Bedford, and travelled several times to London, where he is believed to have inspected the effects of the bombardments on buildings and the citizens.

== Suspicion ==
In January 1941, Ter Braak was contacted by the Food Office about his ration card, which its records showed had been issued to a man named Burton, living in Homefields, Addlestone, Surrey. The card had been supplied by the Abwehr that had been given false numbers by the double agent SNOW (Arthur Owens). Ter Braak evidently suspected that he would be detected, and told his landlady that he had to leave for London. However, he relocated to 11 Montague Road.

== Suicide ==
By March, Ter Braak's money was running out and he had to change his dollar bills through a fellow lodger who worked at a bank. At the end of the month he no longer had enough money to pay his landlady.

On 29 March, he deposited a large case in the left luggage office at Cambridge railway station and disappeared. He is thought to have travelled to somewhere around Cambridge, where he expected an aeroplane to help him out or provide him with further money, because he wore several layers of clothes in order to protect himself against the cold. The following day he went to one of the public air raid shelters at Christ's Pieces park where, using an Abwehr-issue pistol, he committed suicide. His body was found on 1 April by an electrician; the possessions found on him included a forged identity card also carrying numbers issued by Double Agent SNOW (Arthur Owens) which had obvious errors, a Dutch passport without an immigration stamp, and 1/9d in cash. The case at the station was found to contain a radio transmitter.

Ter Braak was buried in an unmarked grave (number 154) in the village cemetery in Great Shelford, four miles south of Cambridge.

== After the war ==
Ter Braak's story was suppressed at the time. An inquest was held in chambers; its findings were released, along with other information about him, on 8 September 1945.

MI5 had found a picture of a young woman in his suitcase with the address of the photoshop in Noordwijk aan Zee. After the information release, the Dutch police found his fiancée, Miss Neeltje van Roon (born 1922 in Noordwijk aan Zee) in November 1946 and told her about his death. In 1947, the Dutch Government asked MI5 if they could have an official statement on the death of Engelbertus Fukken, as his fiancée wished to make a claim for his life insurance policy, which he had put on her name when he left Noordwijk in August 1940. It is thought she never received the money since she had stopped paying the premiums in 1944 and he had committed suicide.

In 1956 Neeltje van Roon married a man from Rijnsburg, a village nearby, never had children and died of a heart attack in 1995. She never talked about the fate of her former fiancé, this being the reason his story remained completely unknown to his family and all inhabitants of Noordwijk aan Zee.

== Literature ==
MI5-file KV2/114, which became public in 1999 gives a good impression of his life in Cambridge and how MI5 tried to find out more about his spying activities. Historian Winston Ramsey conducted research in 1976 about the days that Ter Braak was found dead and was buried nameless (1–8 April 1941).

Jan-Willem van den Braak wrote a biography of Ter Braak in 2017, named 'Spion tegen Churchill', which was translated and published in 2022. He found out many things about his youth and recruitment in Noordwijk aan Zee, also with the help of family members of Ter Braak and his fiancée and some Dutch files in the National Archive in The Hague. The only English authors who describe Ter Braak's recruitment in Noordwijk and his life in Cambridge in more than one page are Joshua Levine in 'Operation Fortitude' (2011) and James Hayward, in 'Double Agent SNOW' (2013).

About Operation Lena in general there are books by Bryden, Peis, Farago, Levine, Hayward, Siedentopf and Verhoeyen, the memoirs of Masterman (MI5), the diaries of Guy Liddell (MI5), the memoirs of Nikolaus Ritter (Abwehr Hamburg) and the website of Giselle Jakobs (a granddaughter of Lena-agent Josef Jakobs).

- KV2/114 TNA (MI5 file of Ter Braak)
- Jan-Willem van den Braak, 'Spion tegen Churchill; Leven en dood van Jan Willem ter Braak' (WalburgPers 2017)
- Jan-Willem van den Braak, 'Zij spioneerden tegen Engeland; Operatie Lena (1940–1941): tot mislukken gedoemd' (ASPEKT 2018)
- Jan-Willem van den Braak, 'Hitler's Spy against Churchill' (Pen&Sword 2022)
- Joseph Bryden, 'Fighting to lose' (2011)
- Ladislas Farago, 'The game of the foxes' (David McKay 1971)
- James Hayward, 'Double Agent SNOW: The true story of Arthur Owens, Hitler's Chief Spy in England' (Simon and Schuster 2013)
- Joshua Levine, 'Operation Fortitude: The Story of the Spy Operation that Saved D-Day' (Collins 2011)
- Ben MacIntyre, 'A friend among spies' (2014)
- J.G. Masterman, 'The Double-Cross System in the war 1939–1945' (Yale University Press 1972)
- Günter Peis, 'They spied on England' (Odham 1958)
- Winston Ramsey (ed.), 'Jan Willem Ter Braak' (After the Battle Magazine, 11–76: 32–34) (1976)
- Nikolaus Ritter, 'Deckname RANTZAU' (1972)
- Monika Siedentopf, 'Unternehemen Seelöwe; Widerstand im deutschen Geheimdienst' (DTV 2014)
- Etienne Verhoeyen, 'Spionnen aan de achterdeur' (2011)
- 'The Guy Liddell Diaries: Vol. I: 1939–1942', ed. by Nigel West (Routledge 2005)
