= All Saints' Church, Cambridge =

Church in central Cambridge, England

All Saints', Jesus Lane
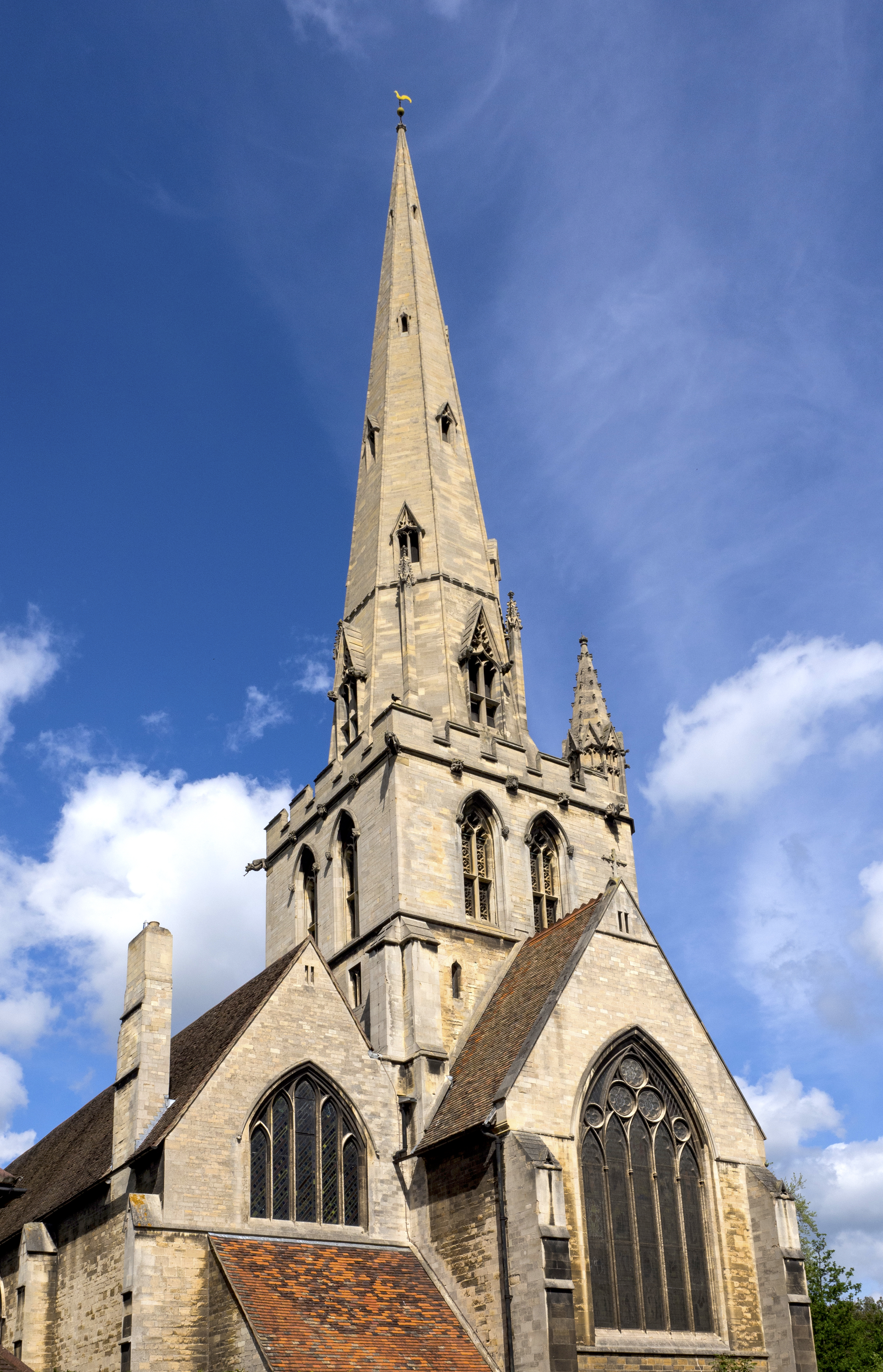
- All Saints' Church from the south east

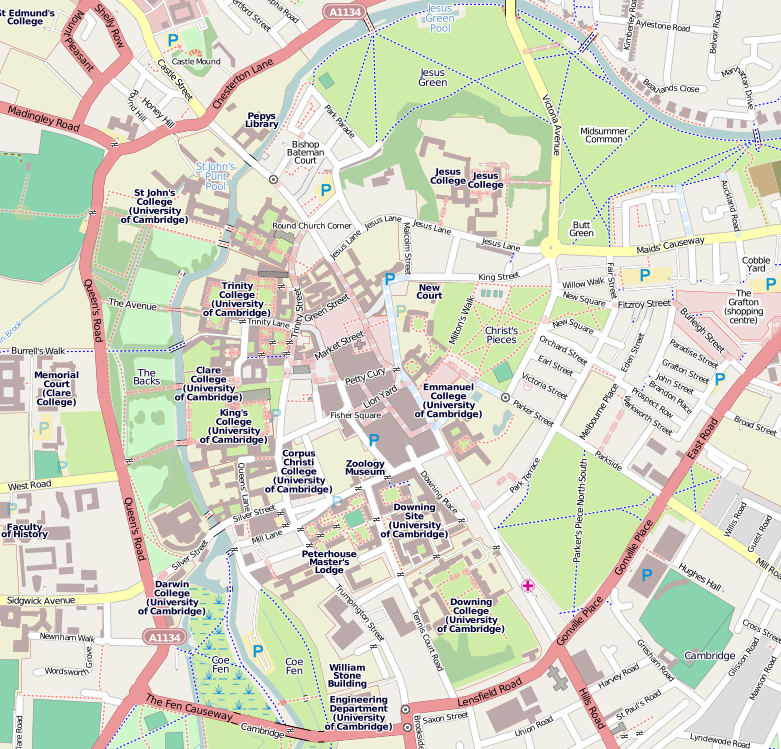
- Location within Central Cambridge

General information
- Architectural style: Gothic Revival
- Location: Jesus Lane, Cambridge, Cambridgeshire, England
- Coordinates: 52°12′30″N 0°07′24″E
- Construction started: 1863
- Completed: 1870

Height
- Height: 175 feet (53 m) (spire)

Design and construction
- Architect: G. F. Bodley

All Saints' is a church on Jesus Lane in central Cambridge, England, which was built by the architect George Frederick Bodley. The church was constructed in stages between 1863 and 1870 and is a notable example of English Gothic Revival style. It was designated Grade I listed building status in 1950. It was vested in the Churches Conservation Trust in 1981.

== History ==
=== All Saints in the Jewry ===
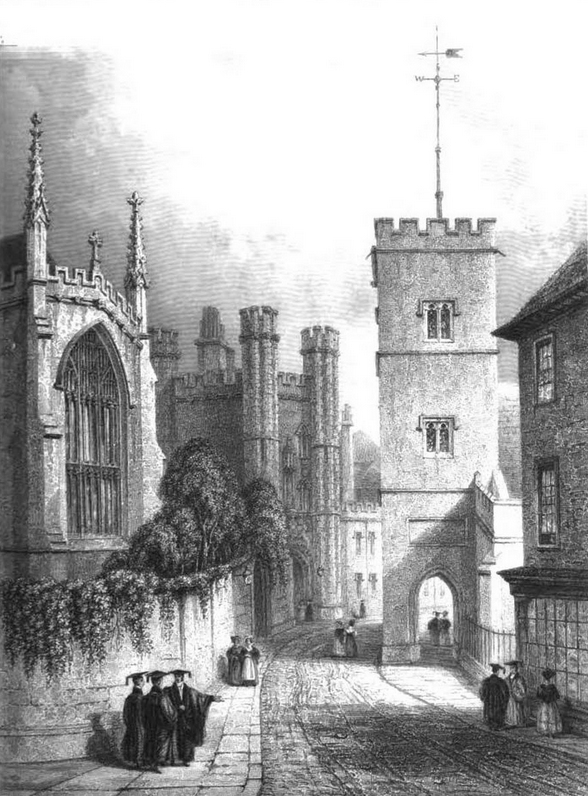
All Saints in the Jewry in 1841 opposite Trinity's chapel (far left) and St John's College gatehouse

A mediæval church stood in St John's Street, Cambridge. This was known as All Saints in the Jewry, and previously as All Saints by the Hospital (due to its proximity to the Hospital of St John the Evangelist). This was to distinguish it from the other All Saints' Church in Cambridge at the time, All Saints by the Castle, now demolished.

By the 13th century, the church was in the patronage of St Radegund's Nunnery, later re-established as Jesus College. The church was rebuilt several times but by the 19th century was deemed too small for the growing congregation, being able to accommodate less than 400 of the 1,400 people of the parish. Consisting of box pews, for which there was a levy, the poor were doubly excluded. A plot of land in Jesus Lane was donated by Jesus College and the new building was erected at its junction with Manor Road. The old church was demolished in 1865. The churchyard of the original church is now an open space known as All Saints' Garden and contains a memorial cross designed by Basil Champneys in 1882.

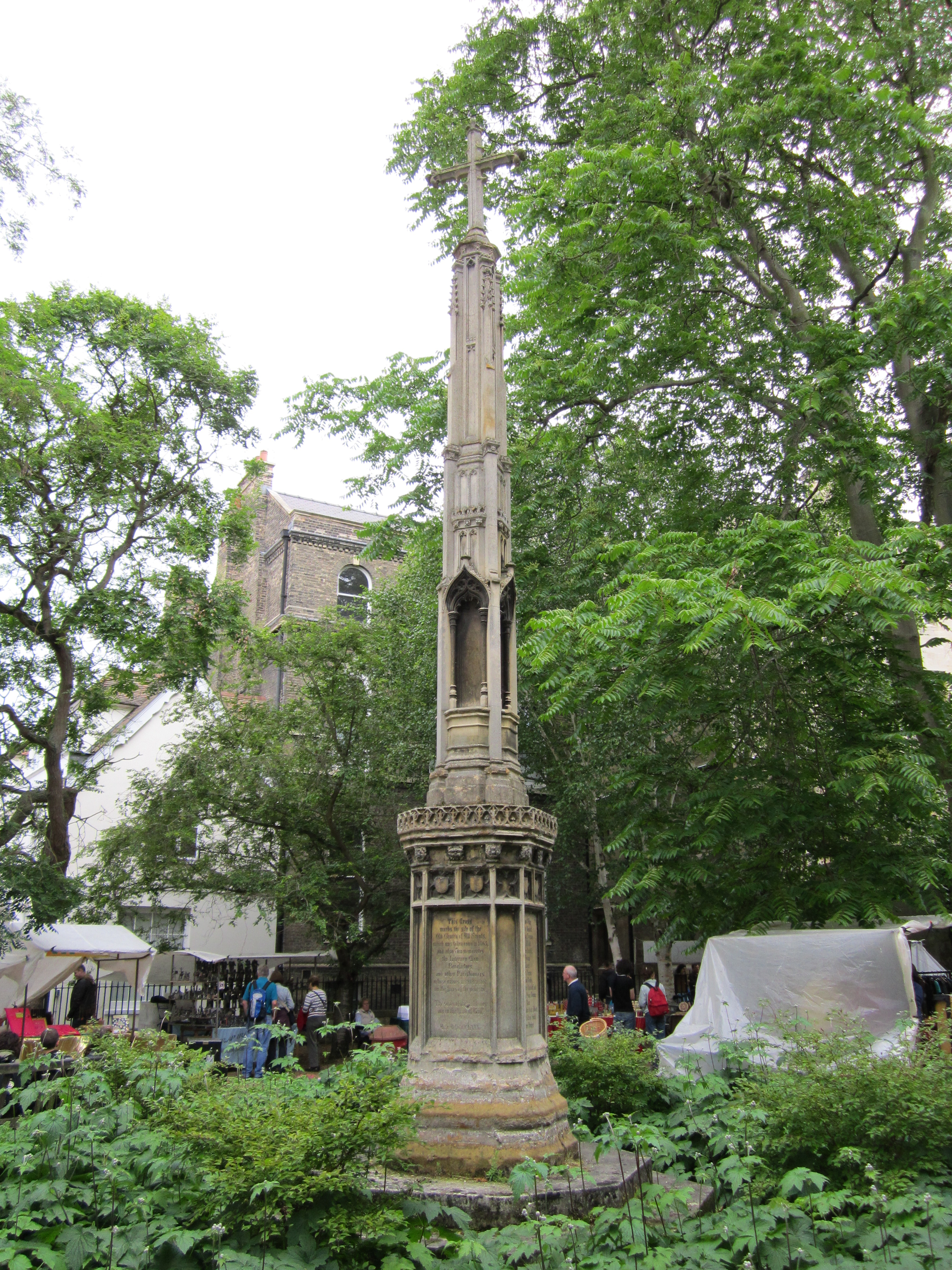
The cross in All Saints' Garden

=== New church ===
Although it was initially hoped that George Gilbert Scott would design the new church, G. F. Bodley who had been Scott's pupil (and was later a founder of Watts & Co.), was chosen. The foundation stone was laid on 27 May 1863 and the church was consecrated on 30 November 1864. Between 1869 and 1871 the present tower and spire were added, with St Oswald's Church, Ashbourne, Derbyshire, used as the model. The final ornament was a weather vane, donated by the Vice-Chancellor of the University of Cambridge, and fixed in place by the priest and author Herbert Mortimer Luckock, later Dean of Lichfield. The author and academic A. C. Bouquet was the parish priest from 1923 to 1945.

As early as the 1920s, All Saints' was already being considered for redundancy by the Church of England. With better social housing in the city, many of the parish's residents had relocated causing the size of the congregation to drop rapidly. This was further aided by the purchase of other larger residences by University colleges whose students did not need a non-collegiate church in which to worship. The final vicar was installed in 1945 and, upon his retirement, services ceased in July 1973. It lay redundant for several years and fell into disrepair, during which time plans to demolish part of the building arose. These were abandoned in 1981.

=== 2021 and beyond ===
In October 2021 a new collaboration between the Churches Conservation Trust and The Arts Society in Cambridge saw the introduction of a regular programme of events at All Saints'. Beginning with October Fest, a series of five Sunday lunchtime recitals, Music At All Saints' has attracted a loyal audience. These concerts present innovative and diverse combinations of instruments and repertoire and have been host to three world premiere performances. They continue monthly on the first Sunday of the month.

Other projects in 2022 include FABULATION, an art exhibition inspired by the interior decoration of the church and created by Jennifer Campbell, Toby Upson, Cathy Lomax and Luke Burton. Also a live performance of ghost stories by M. R. James with Robert Lloyd Parry, an Autumn exhibition on the textiles of the church and a traditional magic show. Money raised from ticketed events goes to support restoration of the interior lighting, and equip the church with toilet facilities and running water. The external appearance of the church is maintained by a small group of volunteers in collaboration with Cambridge City Council. In July 2023 the volunteers planned to mark the 50th anniversary of the last service to be held at the church by highlighting the efforts it took to rescue All Saints' from demolition as well as celebrating its optimistic future. Professional artists Sophie Michael and Andrew Munks were to stage a brand new exhibition in March/April 2023. The church will also celebrate the coronation of King Charles III and take part in Heritage Open Days/Open Cambridge as well as a third October Fest.

Today the church is available to hire for a wide range of events.

== Architecture ==
The church's spire is a prominent Cambridge landmark. At around 175 feet (53 m) in height it was, at its construction, the tallest building in the city; it remains the city's third tallest building, after the chimney of Addenbrooke's Hospital and Our Lady and the English Martyrs Church. It is constructed from brick as well as Ancaster and Casterton stone. The church was built from a second series of designs and in an early 14th-century style. It consists of a nave, large south aisle which extends almost to the easternmost wall, a chancel and vestry. The exterior is decorated with gargoyles and the spire has decorative lucarne openings.

== Interior ==
The church is noted for its strikingly decorated interior, much of it to designs by Bodley. Fittings by Bodley include the alabaster font, the pulpit, south aisle screen, textiles, pews, candlesticks and tiles. The rood screen was designed in 1904 by John Morley, architect at Rattee & Kett of Cambridge. Its function was not purely liturgical as its cornice hid a large support beam which had been added to bolster the chancel arch from the massive weight of the spire.

The wall and ceiling decorations were applied by F. R. Leach & Sons and form complex, bold stencilled patterns throughout the church. As well as exotic floral friezes there is much use of religious symbolism such as the Sacred Monogram and the Fleur-de-lis. Around the upper walls are texts from the Book of Revelation and Psalms in the south aisle, and the Beatitudes in the nave. Part of the Beatitudes have been lost due to water damage to the plaster. One of the team of artists was David Parr who decorated his own house in a similar style and with similar designs. David Parr House on Gwydir Street has been restored and is open to the public.

The east window was designed by Edward Burne-Jones and executed by Morris & Co. It was installed in 1866 as a memorial to Lady Affleck, wife of William Whewell, master of Trinity College, Cambridge. She had lain the foundation stone of the church in 1863 and also donated £1,000 to its construction. The twenty figures, over four rows, were individually designed by Burne-Jones (12 panes), Ford Madox Brown (4 panes) and William Morris (4 panes). The diagonal lettering and oak leaf borders were designed by Philip Webb.

It is most notable for its high proportion of pale, silver-tint glass, which is believed to be a rebellion against the dark, rich colours prevalent in stained glass of the time and it allows much-needed light into the chancel. In the north wall of the nave are three windows by Charles Eamer Kempe and one by Douglas Strachan installed in 1944 which features depictions of Elizabeth Fry, Josephine Butler, Edith Cavell and Mother Cecile Isherwood. There are also two south aisle windows, one by Ward & Hughes and the other by Philip Webb with possible additions by F. R. Leach. High in the west end window are two angels - a sun bearer and a moon bearer designed and produced by William Morris.

== Gallery ==
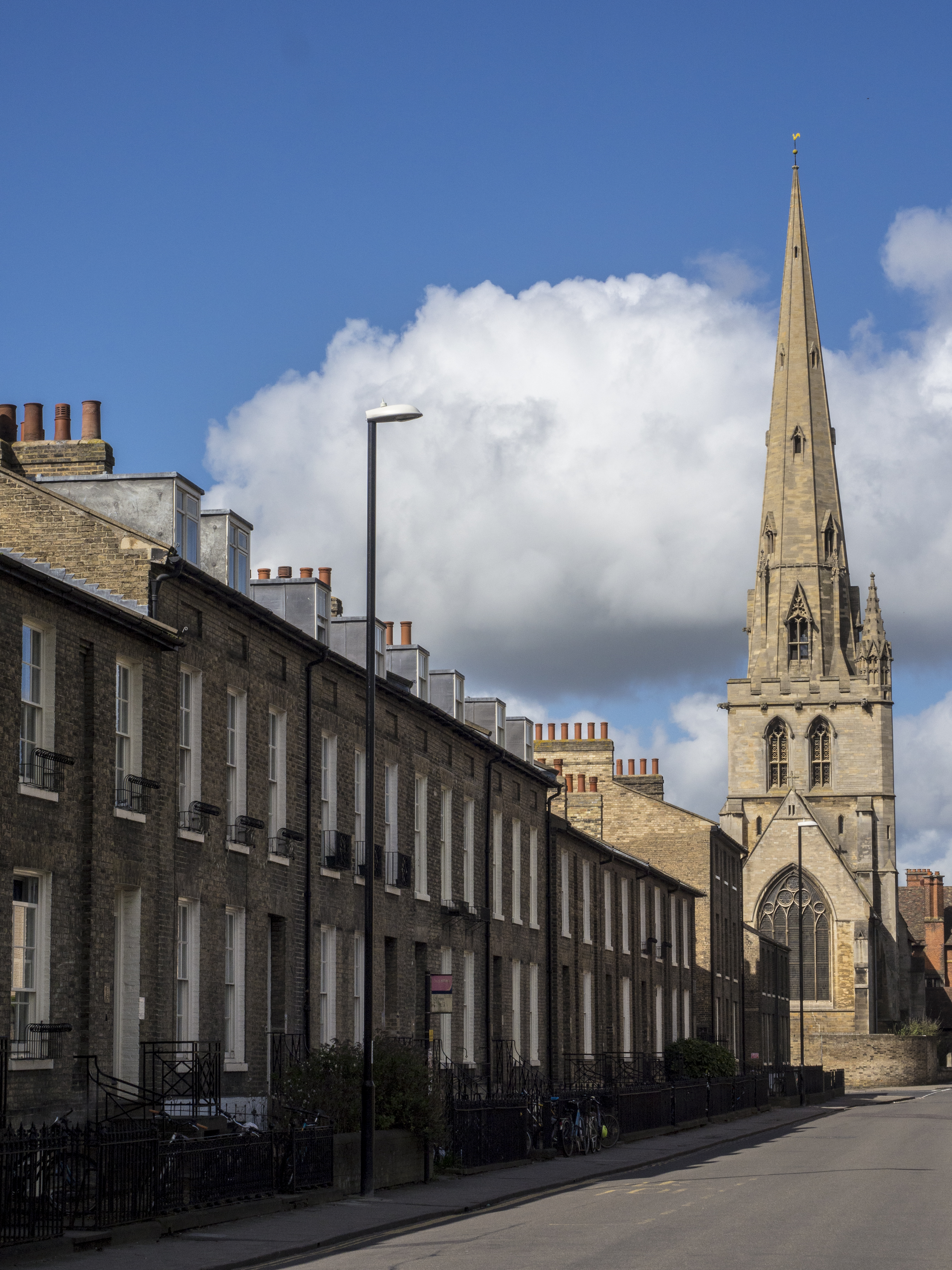
All Saints' Church from the eastern end of Jesus Lane

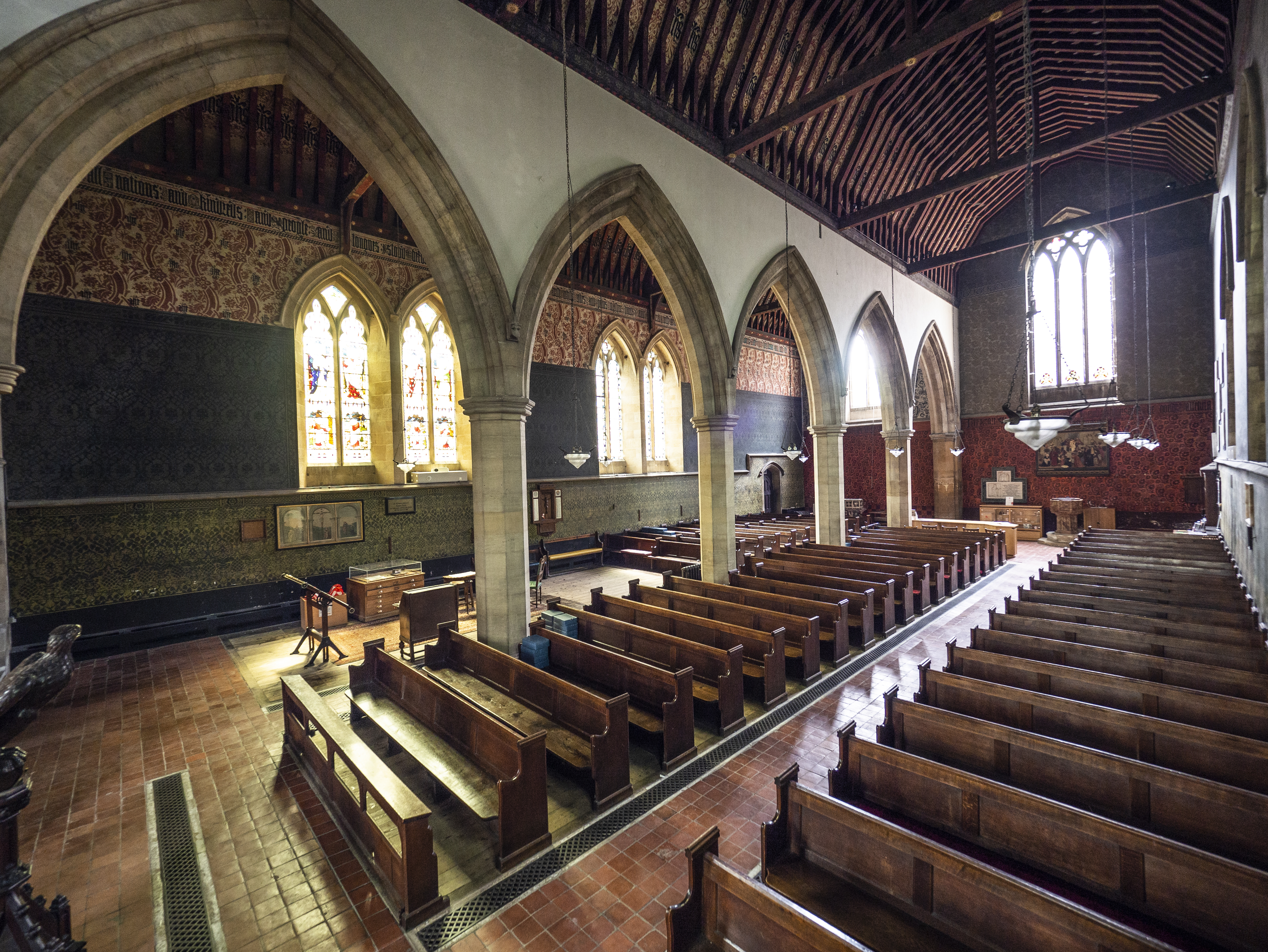
Nave, arcade and south aisle

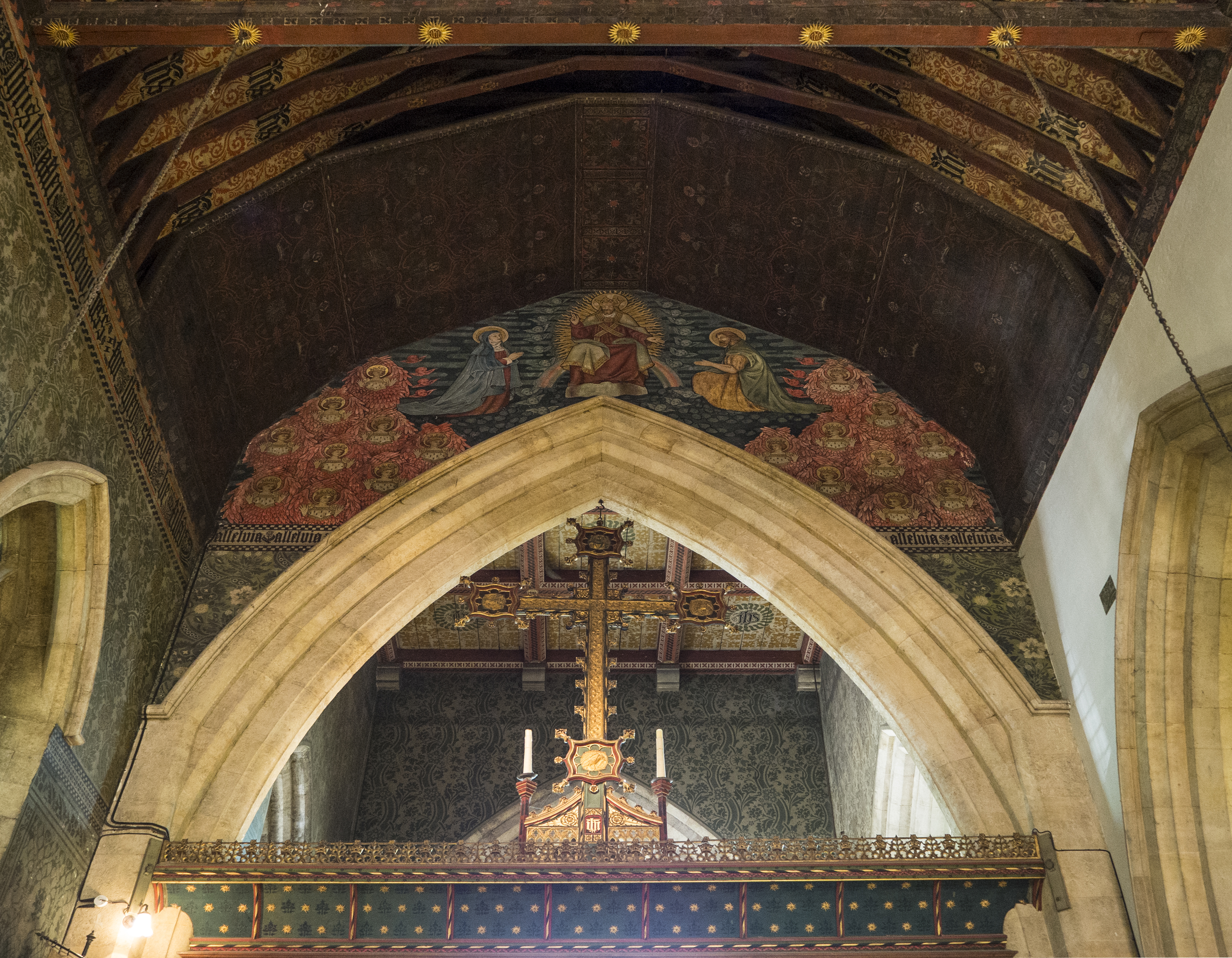
Chancel arch with painting of "Christ in Majesty" by Wyndham Hope Hughes

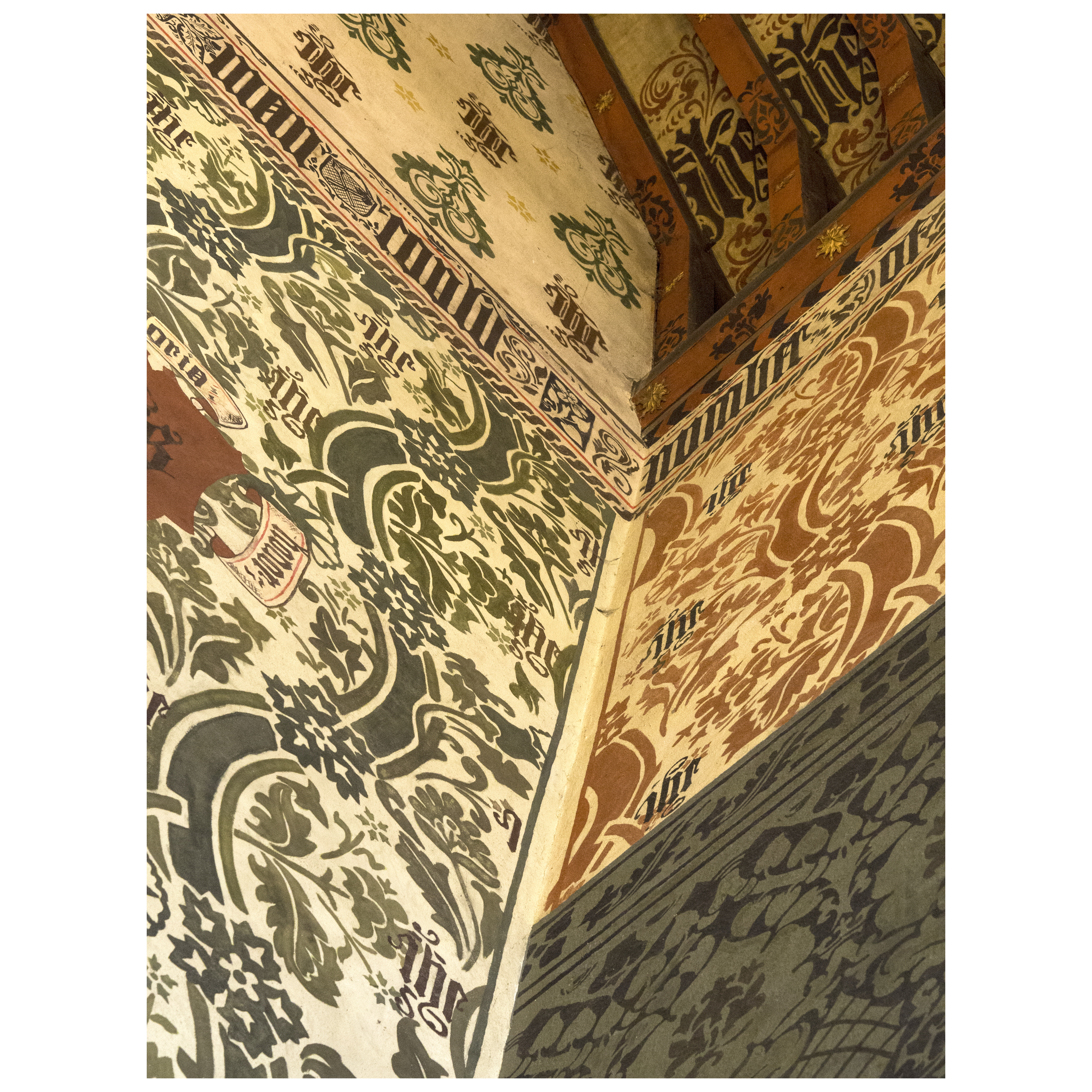
Bodley's designs in the SE corner of the south aisle

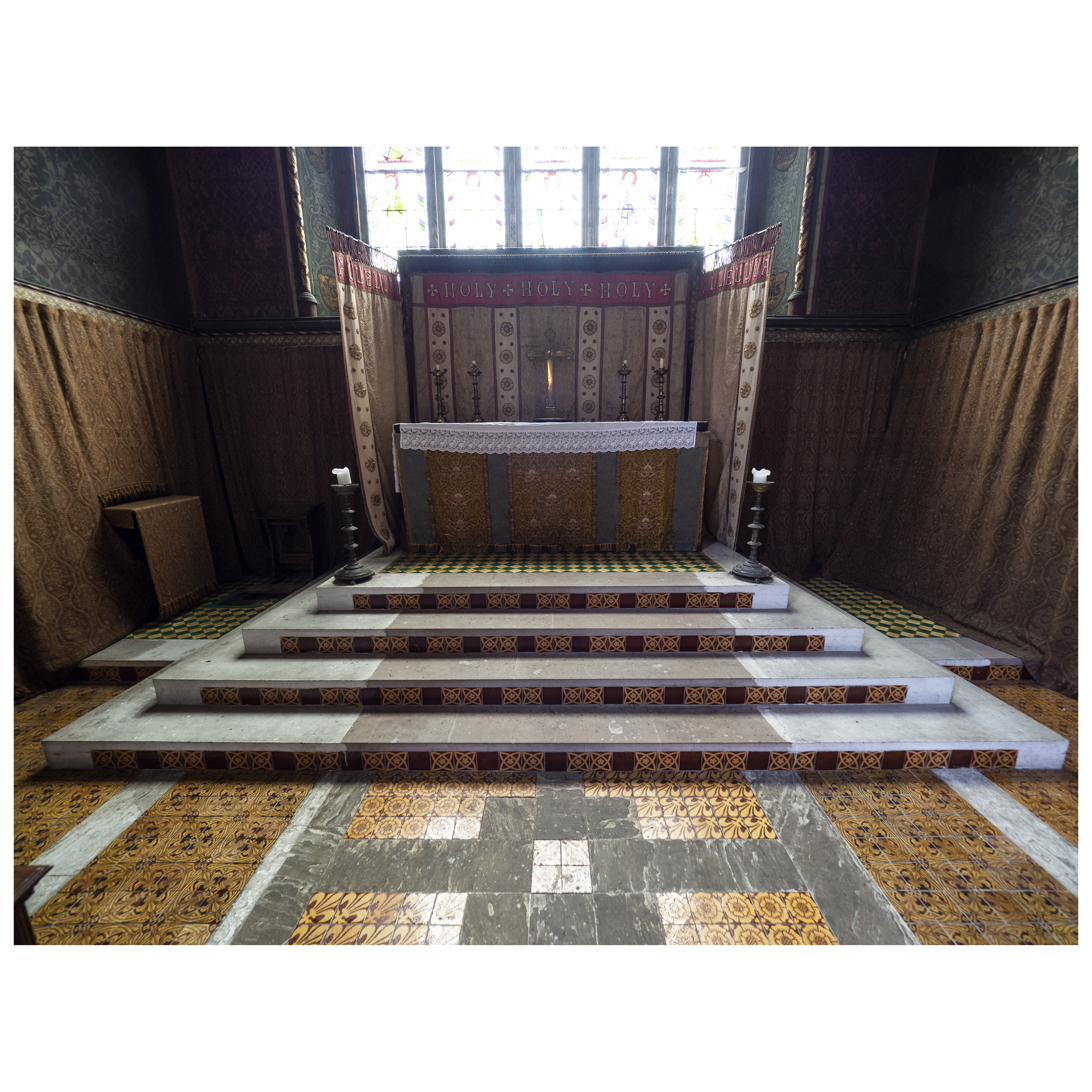
The altar

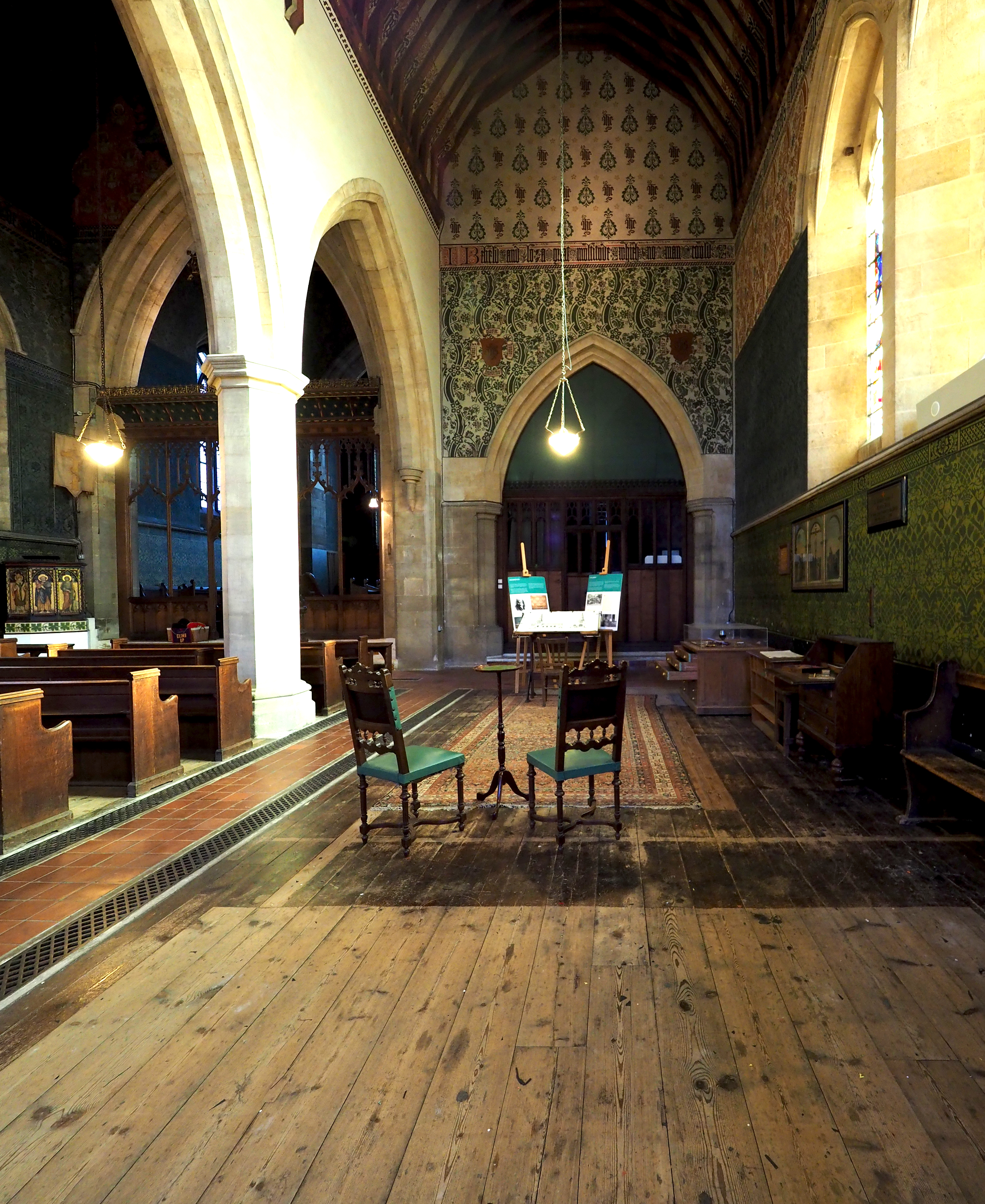
South aisle, looking east

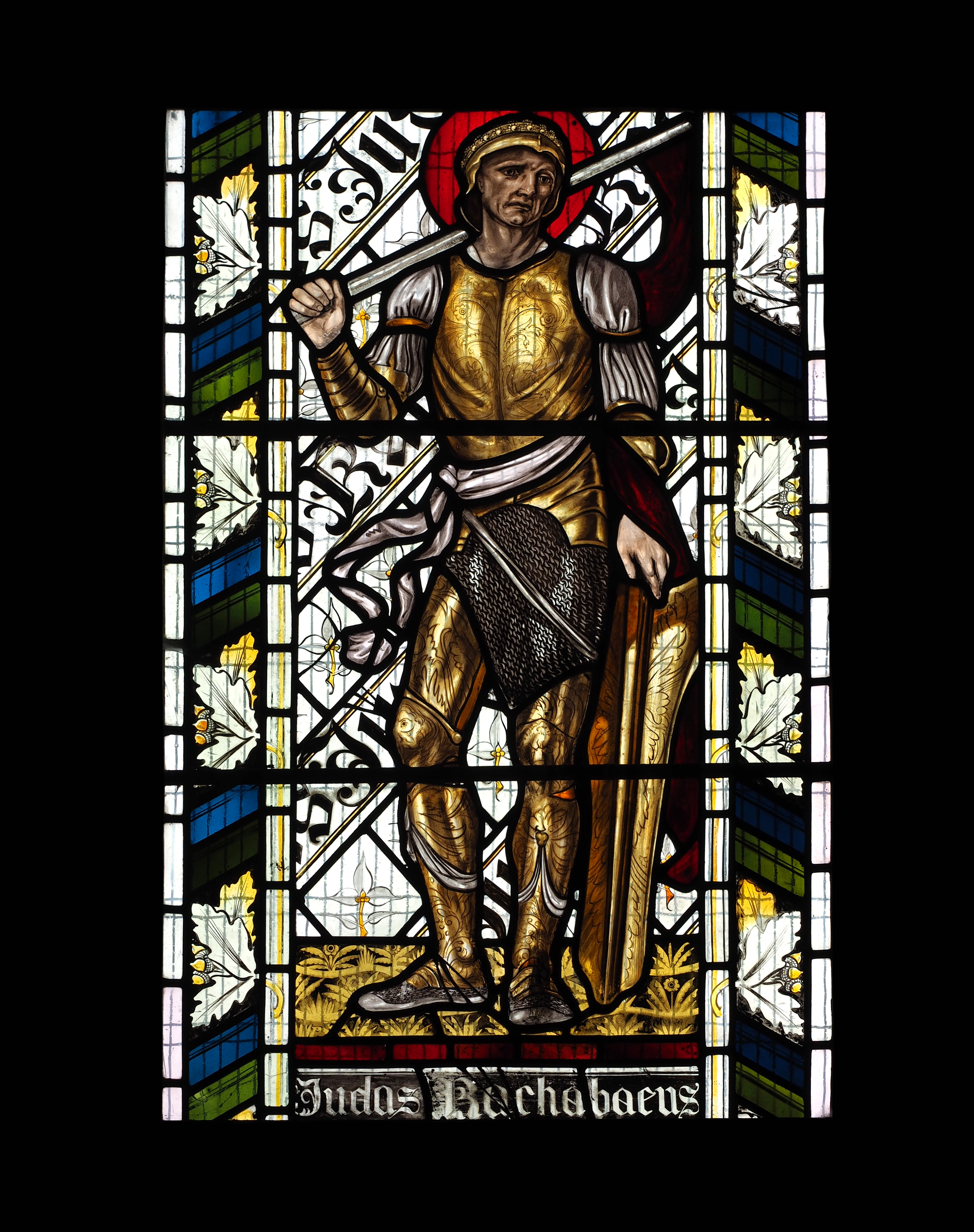
Judas Maccabeus by Edward Burne-Jones from the east window by Morris, Marshall, Faulkner & Co.

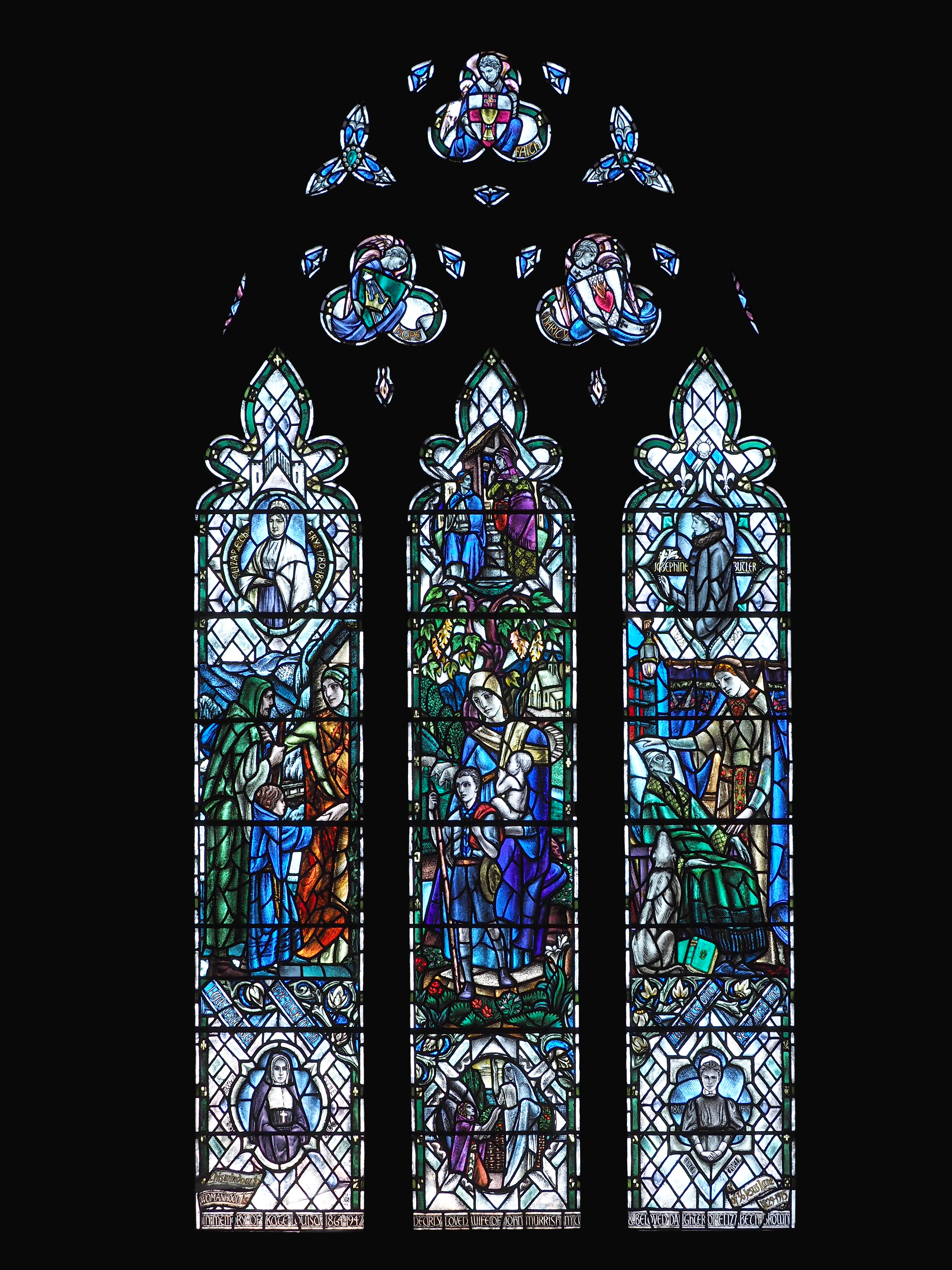
The 'Womanhood' window by Douglas Strachan in the NW nave

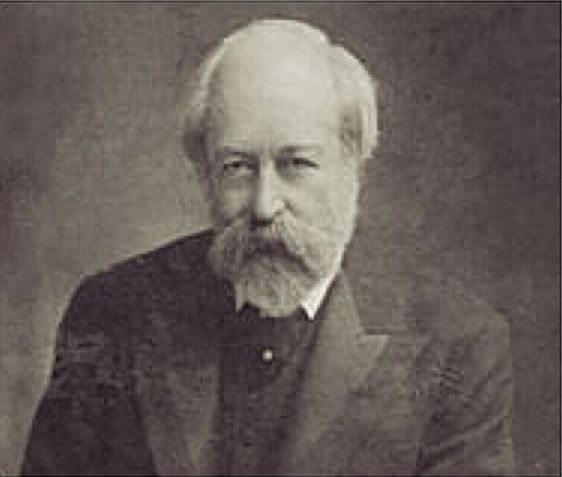
George Bodley, architect of All Saints'

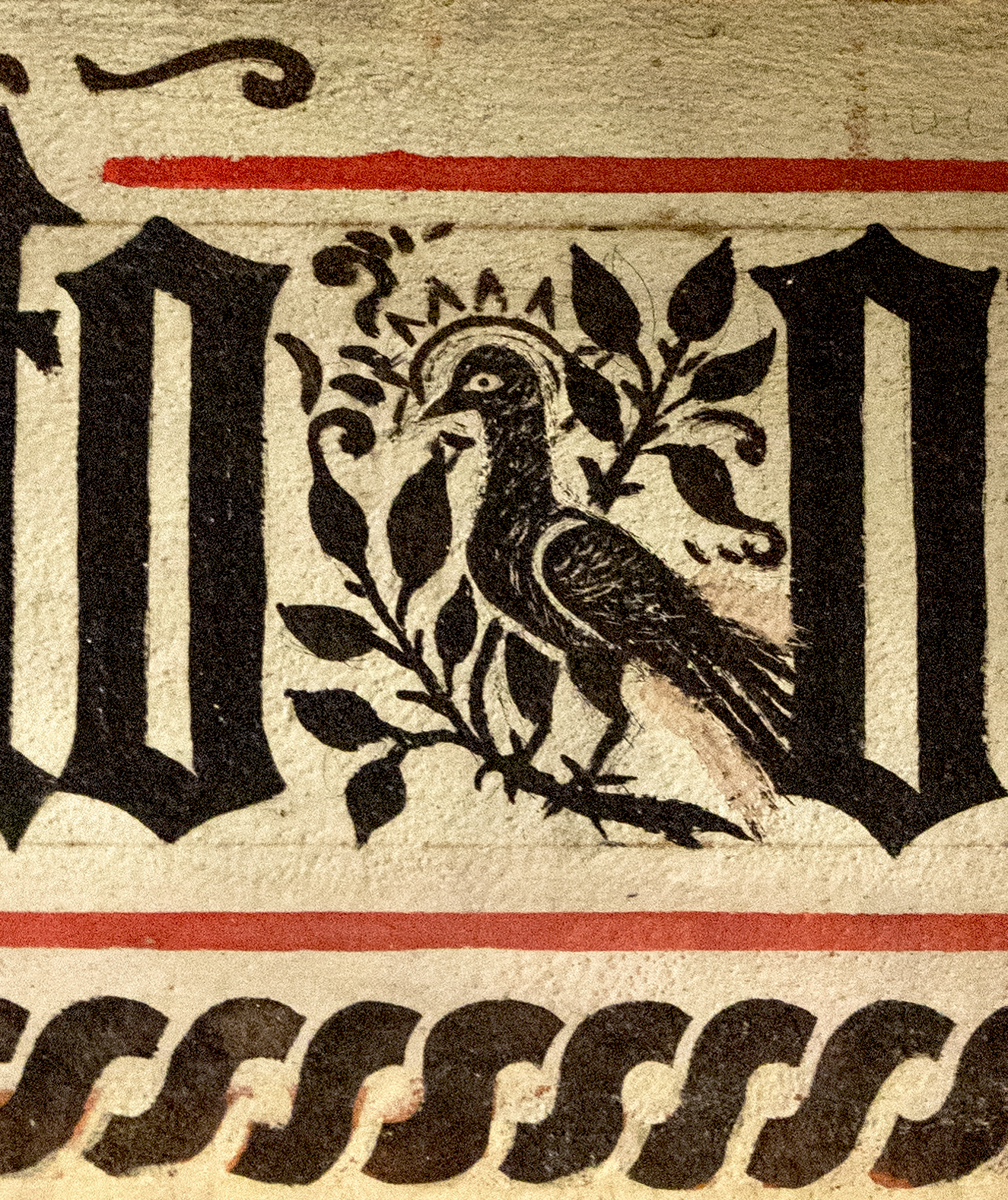
Nave stencilling by F. R. Leach & Sons

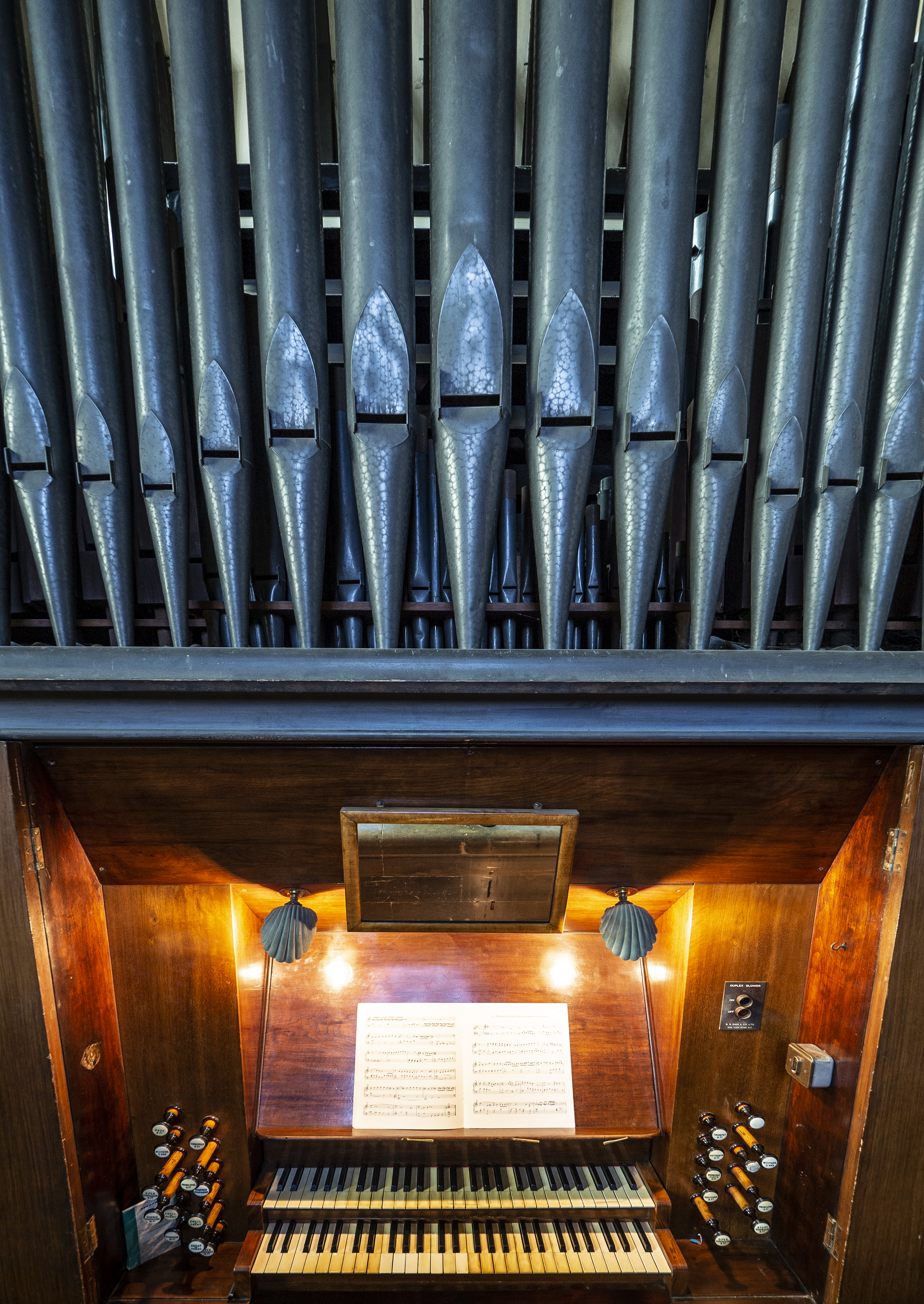
Forster & Andrews organ of 1864

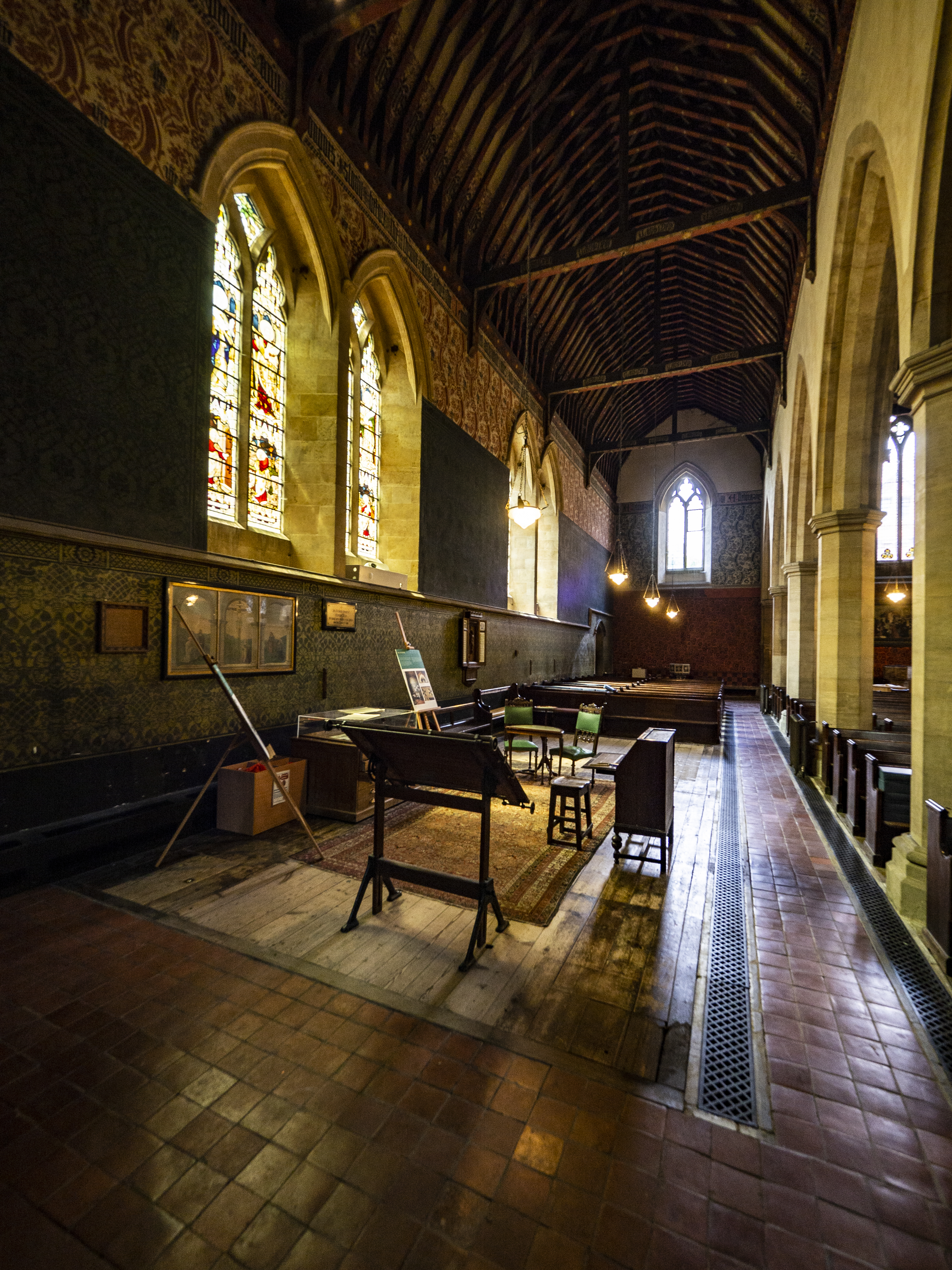
South aisle

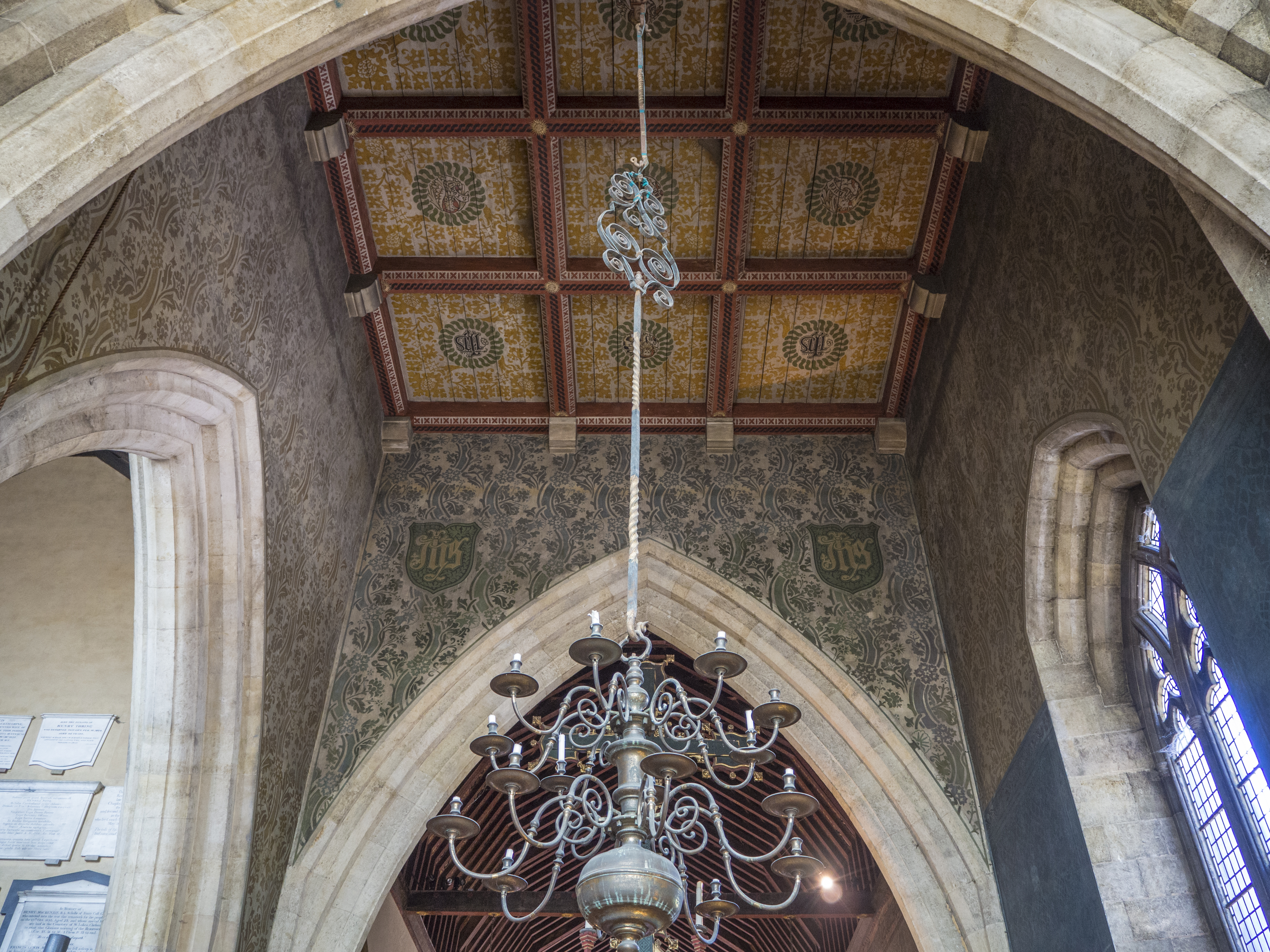
Chancel canopy, wall decorations & chandelier

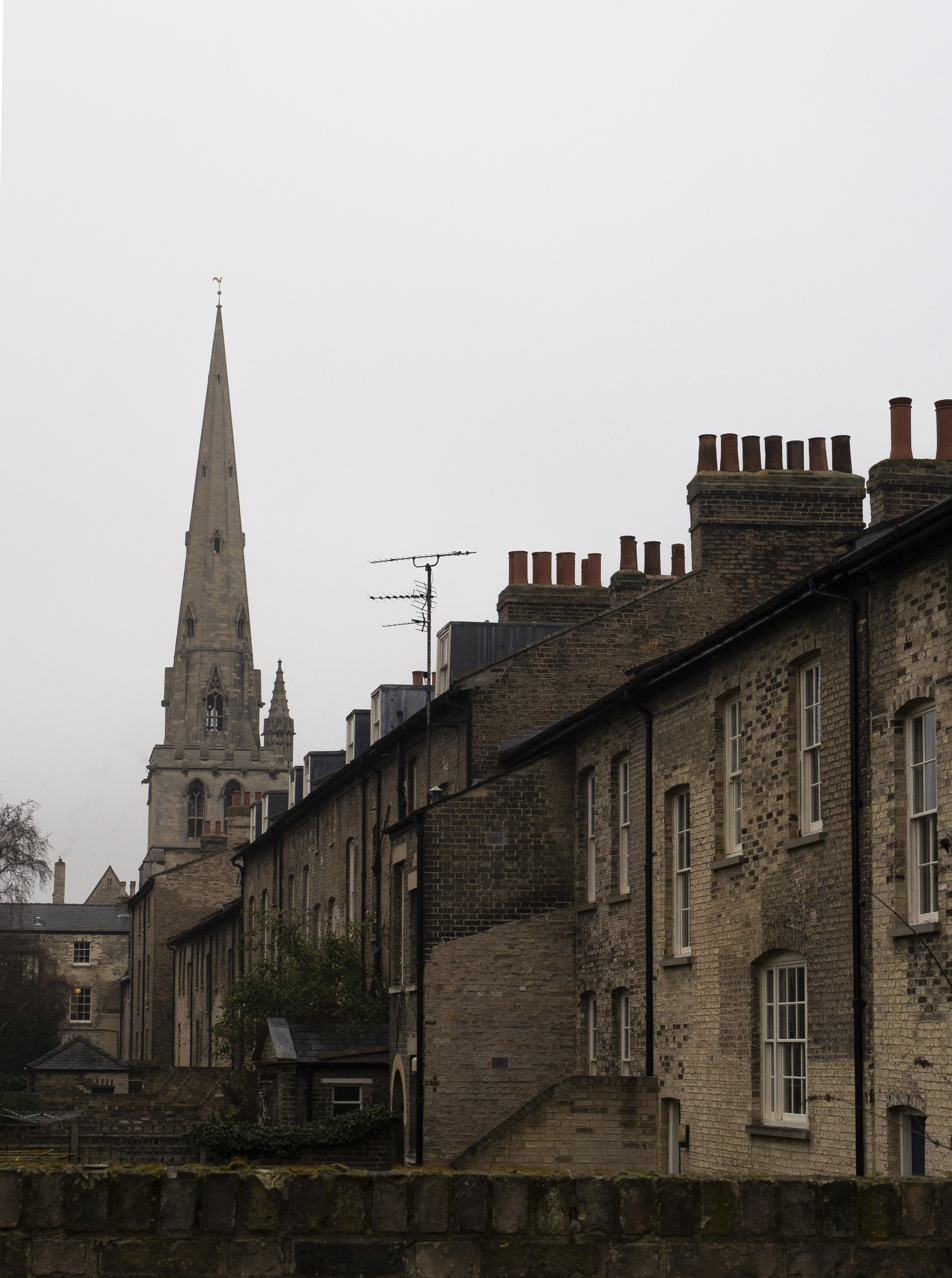
All Saints' with the rear of the neighbouring Jesus Lane terraces

== See also ==
- Anglo-Catholicism
- Arts and Crafts movement
- British and Irish stained glass (1811–1918)
- English Gothic architecture
- List of churches preserved by the Churches Conservation Trust in the East of England
- St Peter's Church, Cambridge, also in the care of the CCT
