= King Street, Cambridge =

Street in Cambridge, England

Coordinates: 52.2074°N 0.1239°E

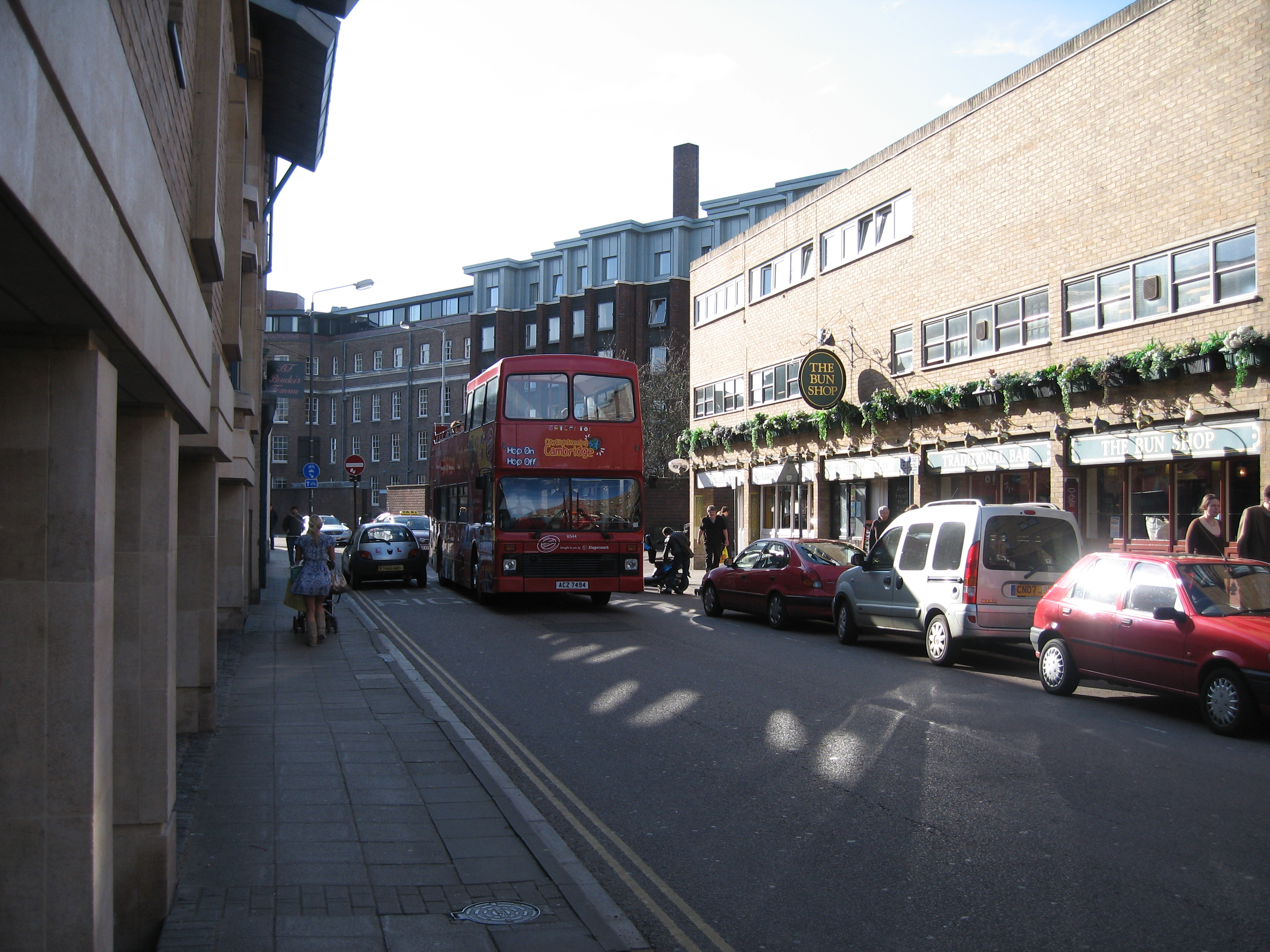
View of King Street.

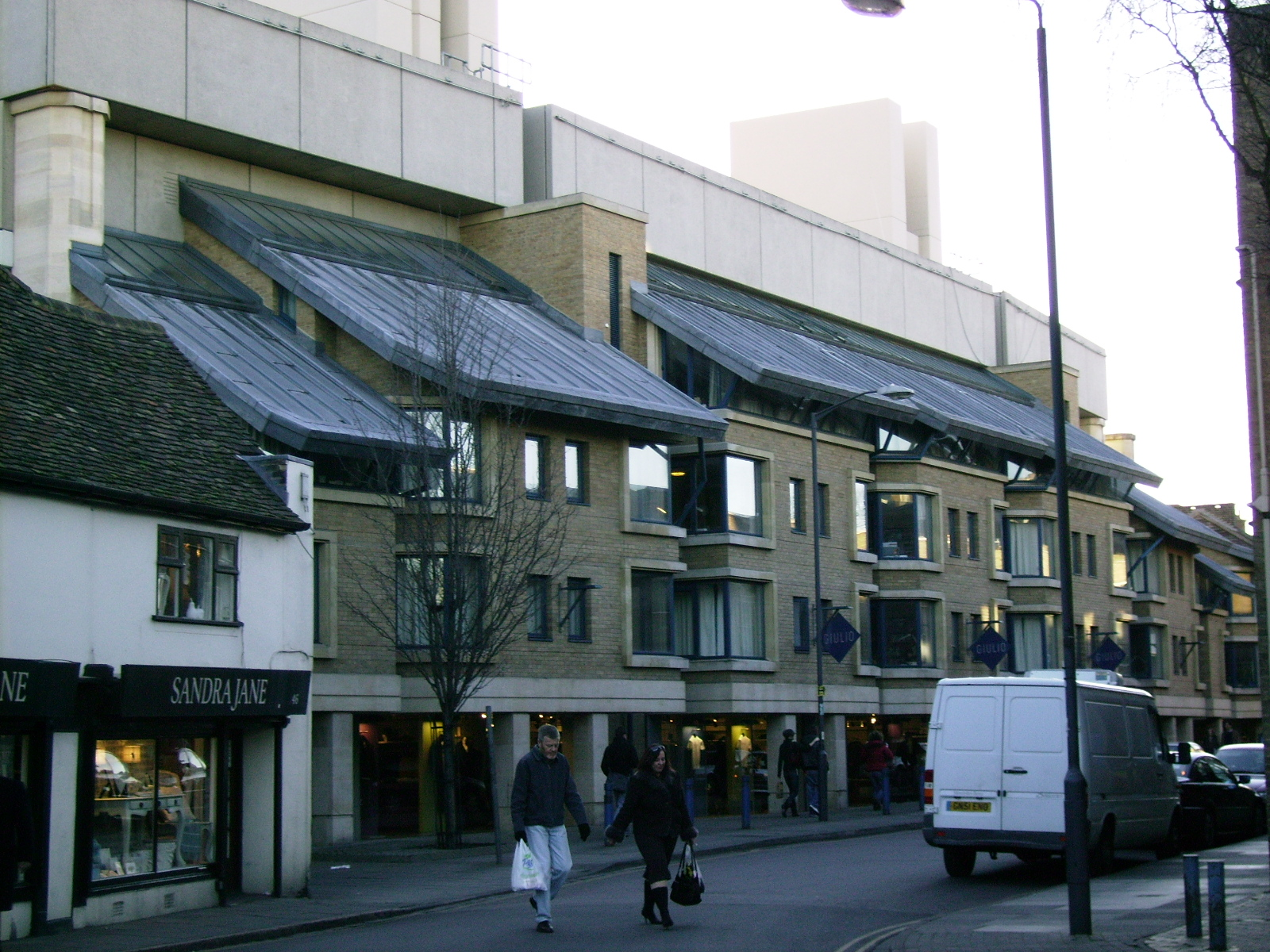
Christ's College buildings on King Street.

King Street is a street in central Cambridge, England. It connects between Sussex Street heading west and Hobson Street heading south at the western end and a large roundabout to the east. It runs parallel to and south of Jesus Lane. The roads link together at Four Lamps roundabout at the eastern end. To the east is Maid's Causeway and then Newmarket Road leading out of Cambridge. To the north is Victoria Avenue between Jesus Green and Midsummer Common. To the south is Short Street, Cambridge, quickly leading into Emmanuel Road past Christ's Pieces.

Sidney Sussex College backs on to the street to the northwest. Christ's College is to the south, with some of its buildings on the street.

== Public houses ==
There are currently four pubs on King Street:

- The King Street Run (86 King Street, previously named The Horse and Groom and dating back to at least the 1830s), named after an organized pub crawl of the same name
- The Champion of the Thames (68 King Street, in use as a pub since the late 1860s).
- St Radegund, (129 King Street, built in 1880 on part of the site of the Garrick Hotel) named after the sixth-century saint, Radegund
- The Cambridge Brew House (1 King Street, previously the Jolly Scholar, the Bun Shop, the Kings Arms, the Royal Arms), built in the 1970s.

There are also a number of restaurants on the street.

=== Former public houses ===
The street was previously noted for the number of pubs and was at one stage synonymous with the King Street Run pub crawl. Former pubs on the street included (italicised street numbers indicate the numbering scheme prior to 1897):

- The Boot (39/97 King Street)
- Cambridge Ale Stores/Cambridge Arms (4/6 King Street. Now d'Arry's restaurant. Briefly called The Brewery, and Rattle and Hum in early 2000s)
- Carpenters Arms (45/93&94 King Street), briefly Three Compasses (1860s) closed early 20th Century)
- Cow & Calf (22/11 King Street 19th Century) then Millers Arms until c.1904
- Earl Grey (60/34 King Street)
- The Garrick Hotel or Garrick's Head (52 King Street, Briefly called The Shakespeare in the 1870s. Demolished prior to 1880 and now the partial site of the St Radegund)
- Glaziers Arms (21/105 King Street until 1880s), but briefly Plumbers Arms c.1858, then Royal Arms until late 1960s then, briefly, King's Arms (7 King Street, modern numbering, corner of Malcolm Street). An earlier King's Arms stood in King's Court off the north side of King Street from the 1830s to 1850s, and was named the Two Swans in 1875.
- The Harp (84 King Street. Closed 1870s)
- Sebastopol (76 King Street. Closed 1880s)
- White Hart (22 King Street. Closed 1870s)
- Yorkshire Grey (107/64 King Street. Closed early 20th Century)

== Pub crawl ==
The King Street Run is a bi-annual combined run and pub crawl that takes place along King Street. In this format it was originally organised in 1982 by Cambridge Hash House Harriers to mark their 200th run.

Its origins lie in a discussion in the Criterion, Market Passage, in Autumn 1955 between three undergraduates of St John's College, all either Royal Navy or Royal Marines, and a group of medical students of unknown college affiliation. It was asserted by one of the medical students that the male bladder could hold no more than four pints. The St John's students disagreed in principle and the group agreed to settle the argument by meeting on a specified evening and having a drink in every pub on King Street. The pubs visited were:

- Duke of Cambridge (5 & 6 Short Street)
- The Radegund
- Horse and Groom
- Champion of the Thames
- Earl Grey
- Royal Arms
- Cambridge Arms
- Prince of Wales (Hobson's Passage)

After the party allegedly carried out the feat of having a drink at each pub without stopping to urinate, the King Street Pint to Pint Club was formally constituted as a University club. The basic objective was to drink a pint of ale in seven of the street's pubs before returning for an eighth in the pub you started in. Rules to be observed for the duration of drinking included a penalty pint awarded for the commission of either of the two Ps, “peeing or puking”. Successful participants were allowed to wear a special navy blue tie decorated with the image of a tankard surmounted by a crown.

This original incarnation of the King Street Run lasted only 11 years before the Club was banned by University authorities.

It survived in a less formal manner until 1975 when the street's publicans themselves banned any future runs following public disorder.
