= The Champion of the Thames =

Pub in King Street, Cambridge, England

Coordinates: 52°12′26″N 0°07′28″E

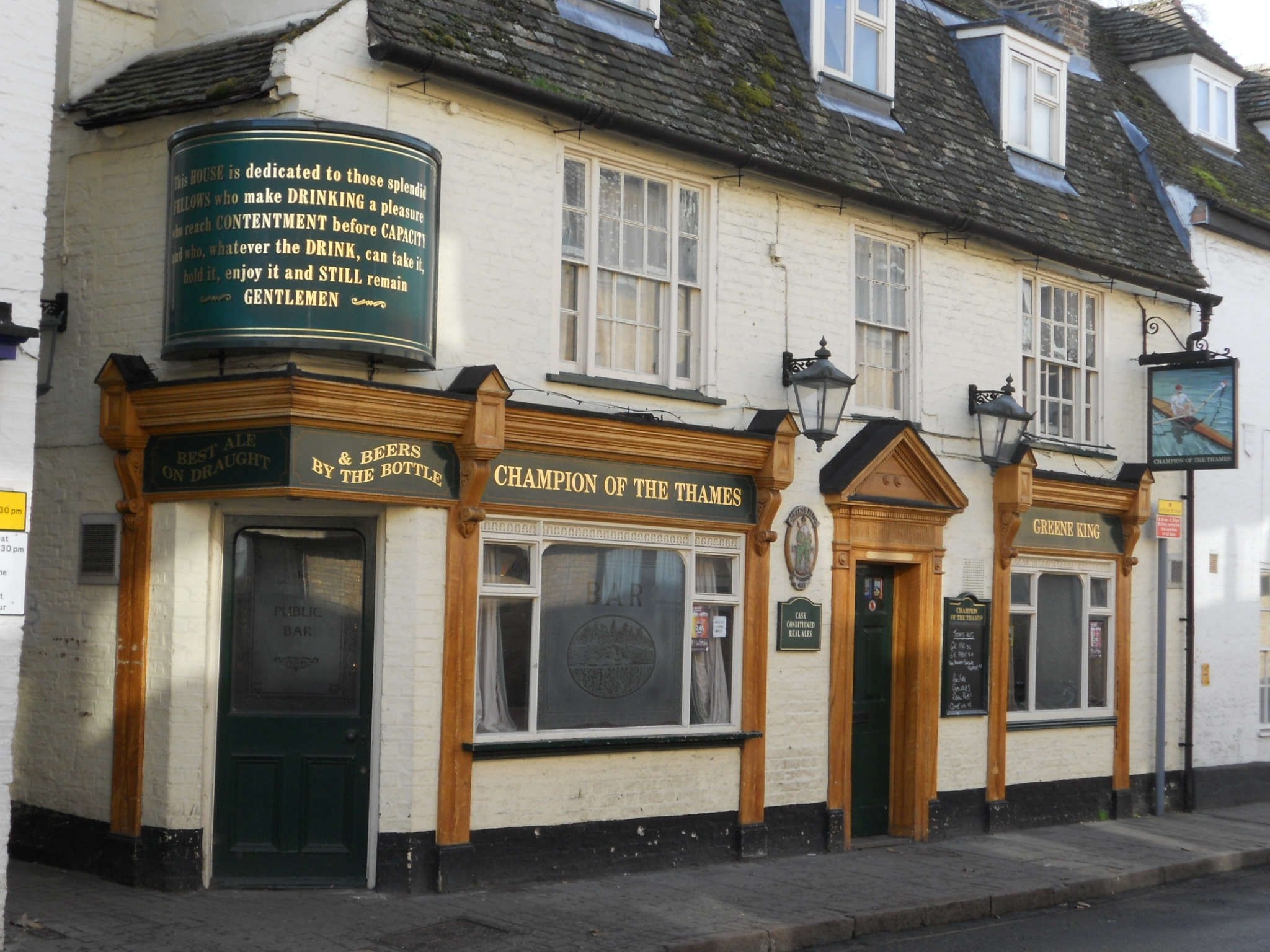

Champion of the Thames is a pub in King Street, Cambridge, England. The pub's name derives from an oarsman who won a sculling race on the Thames before moving to Cambridge in 1860. He required that all mail to him be addressed to "The Champion of the River Thames, King Street, Cambridge". The rowing connection continues, the Champion of the Thames rowing club being sponsored by the pub.

It is a Grade II listed building, and its late-19th-century interior is unaltered. It is on the Regional Inventory of Historic Pub Interiors for East Anglia.

The pub is mentioned in Tom Sharpe's novel Porterhouse Blue, in which it is said to be the character Skullion's favourite pub, although Sharpe changed the pub's name to The Thames Boatman in the novel. It is one of the smaller pubs in Cambridge and is part of the King Street Run, a pub crawl with the object of consuming one pint of beer in each pub in King Street in the quickest time. Since 1992, a team from the pub has played an annual cricket match against a team from the St Radegund for the King Street Trophy.

In 2024 the Cambridge and District branch of the Campaign for Real Ale declared it their City Pub of the Year and overall Pub of the Year award winners.
