= Christ's Pieces =

Park in Cambridge, England

Coordinates: 52°12′21″N 0°07′30″E

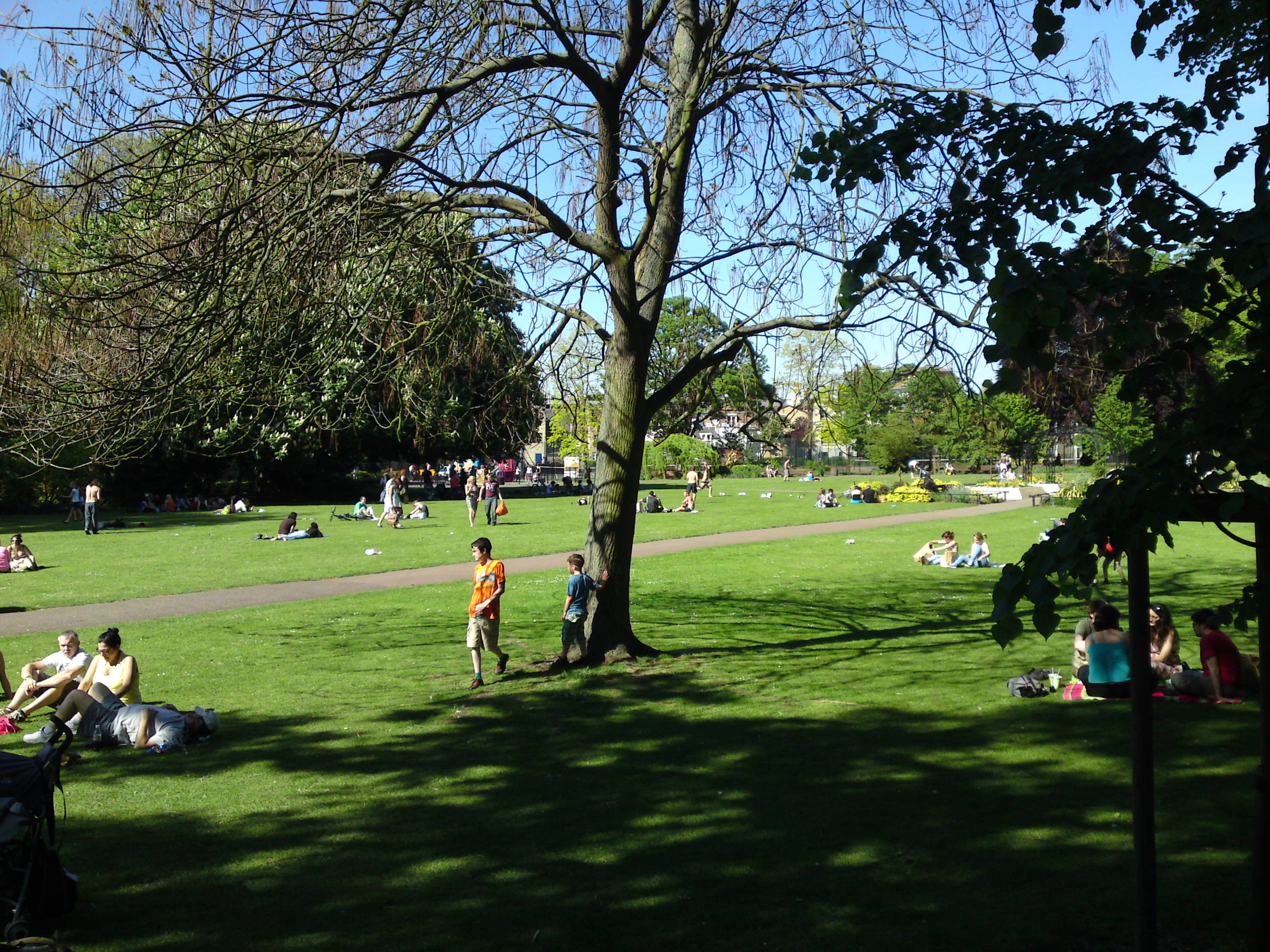
Summer on Christ's Pieces

Christ's Pieces or Christ's Piece is a Victorian park in the east of central Cambridge, Cambridgeshire, England, with flower beds, ornamental trees and a memorial garden to Diana, Princess of Wales. The area acts as an important publicly accessible open grassed area for the city centre. It is east of Christ's College and to the north of Emmanuel College. To the north is King Street, to the east is Emmanuel Road, to the south is Drummer Street, and to the west is Milton's Walk.

The park is used by pedestrians walking between the centre of the city and the Grafton Centre (a shopping centre). In good weather, it is often used as a place for lunch outside as well. There are tennis courts at the northwest corner of Christ's Pieces and a bowling green in the southeast corner. The main central Cambridge bus station is north off Drummer Street on the southern edge of Christ's Pieces near the southwest corner.

There is a Christ's Pieces Residents Association (CPRA) for local residents and others interested in maintaining the character of the surrounding area.

== History ==
Previously, the area was farmland. For example, it is shown to have a cereal crop on a 1574 map. Later it became pasture land. Milton's Walk was a medieval lane, called "Christes Colledge Walke" in 1574.

Milton's Walk is named after the poet John Milton (1608–74), who was an undergraduate at Christ's College. It marks the boundary of the college with Christ's Pieces.

In 1886, the land was bought from Jesus College by the Corporation of Cambridge for £1,000 (equivalent to £140,000 in 2023). The Corporation drained it better and created the park much as it is now, but a proposed artificial lake was never created and the bandstand no longer exists.

In 2013, its paths were used in a trial of "Starpath", which absorbs UV energy during the day and emits it at night to illuminate the path.

On 15 May 2015, two Libyan cadets, who had been stationed in the nearby Bassingbourn Barracks, were each jailed for 12 years for raping a man in the park. A spokesman for the employer said it condemned the behaviour and that related training will not be repeated at Bassingbourn.

== Gallery ==
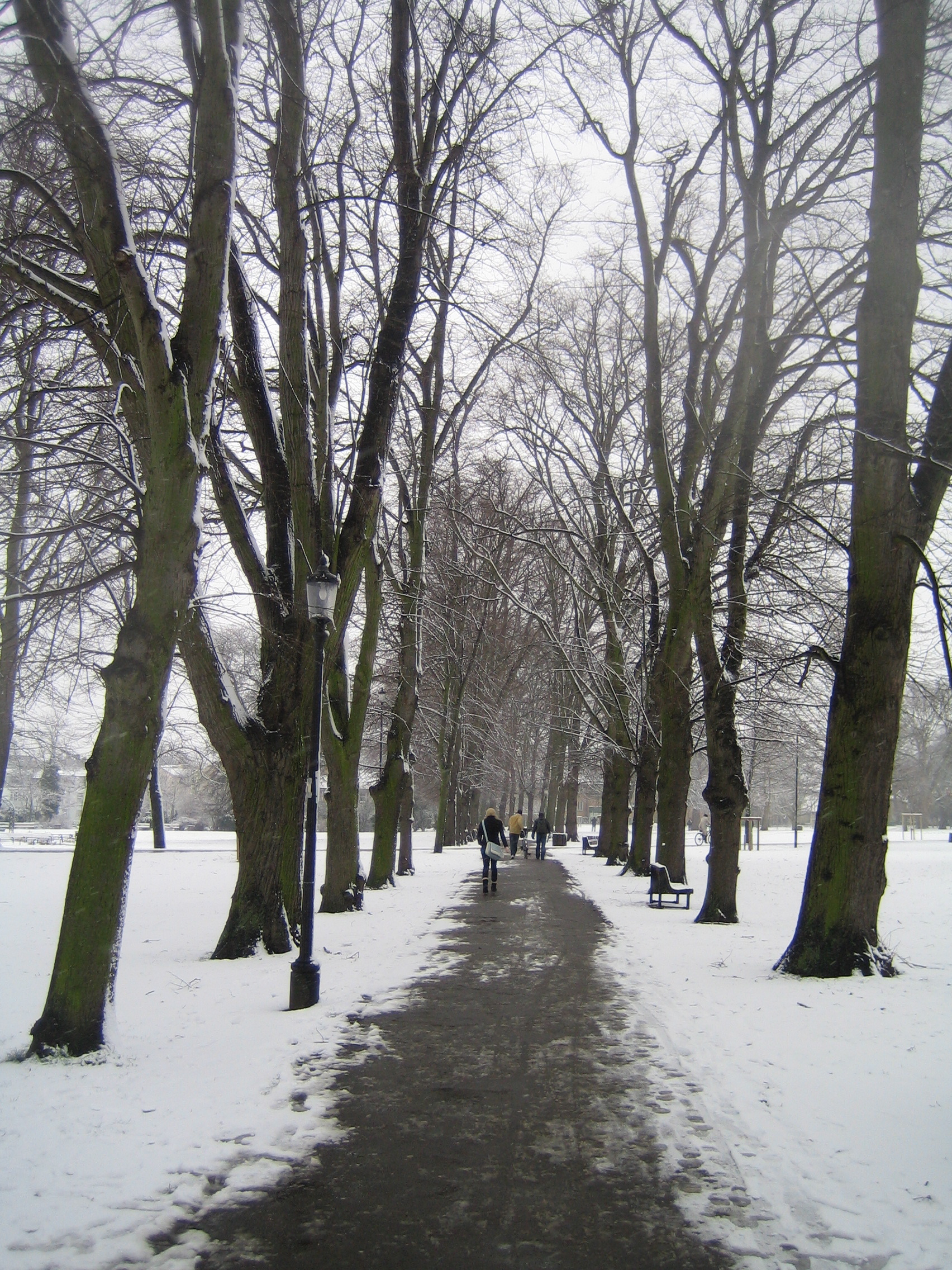
Snowy path through Christ's Pieces

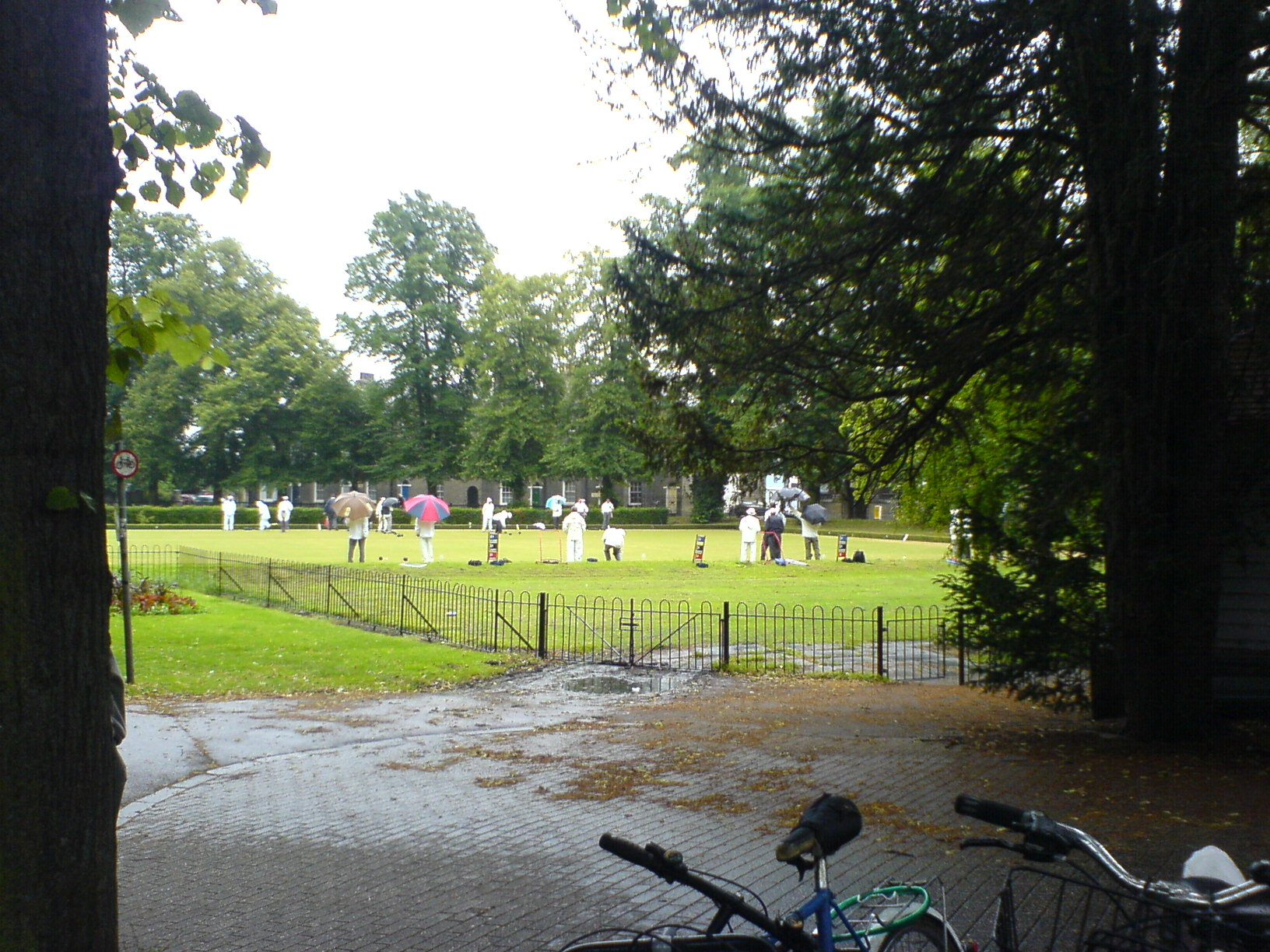
Bowls on the bowling green
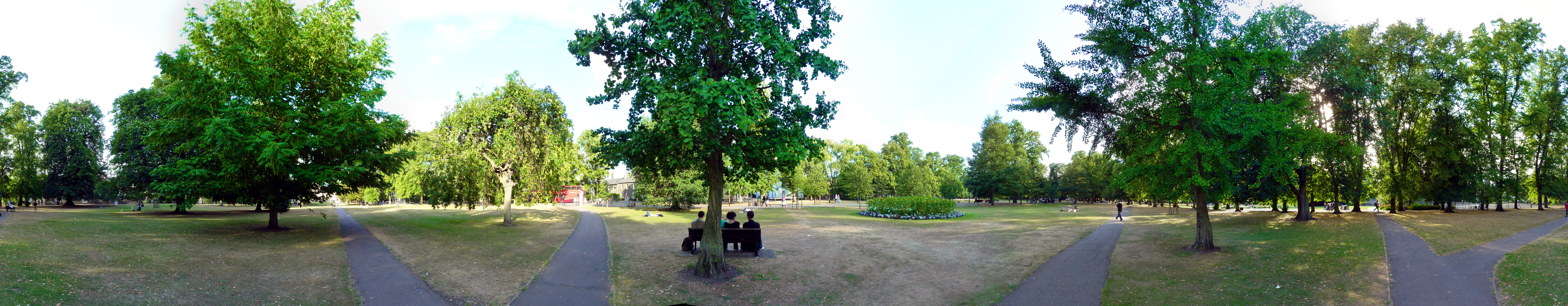
360° Panorama of Christ's Pieces.

== See also ==
- Jesus Green
- Parker's Piece
