= St Radegund's Priory, Cambridge =

Benedictine nunnery

Coordinates: 52°12′32.7″N 0°7′24.7″E

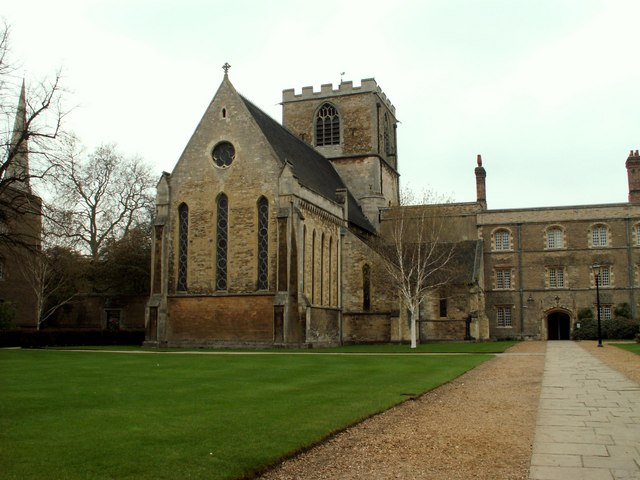
The church of the nunnery, now Jesus College Chapel

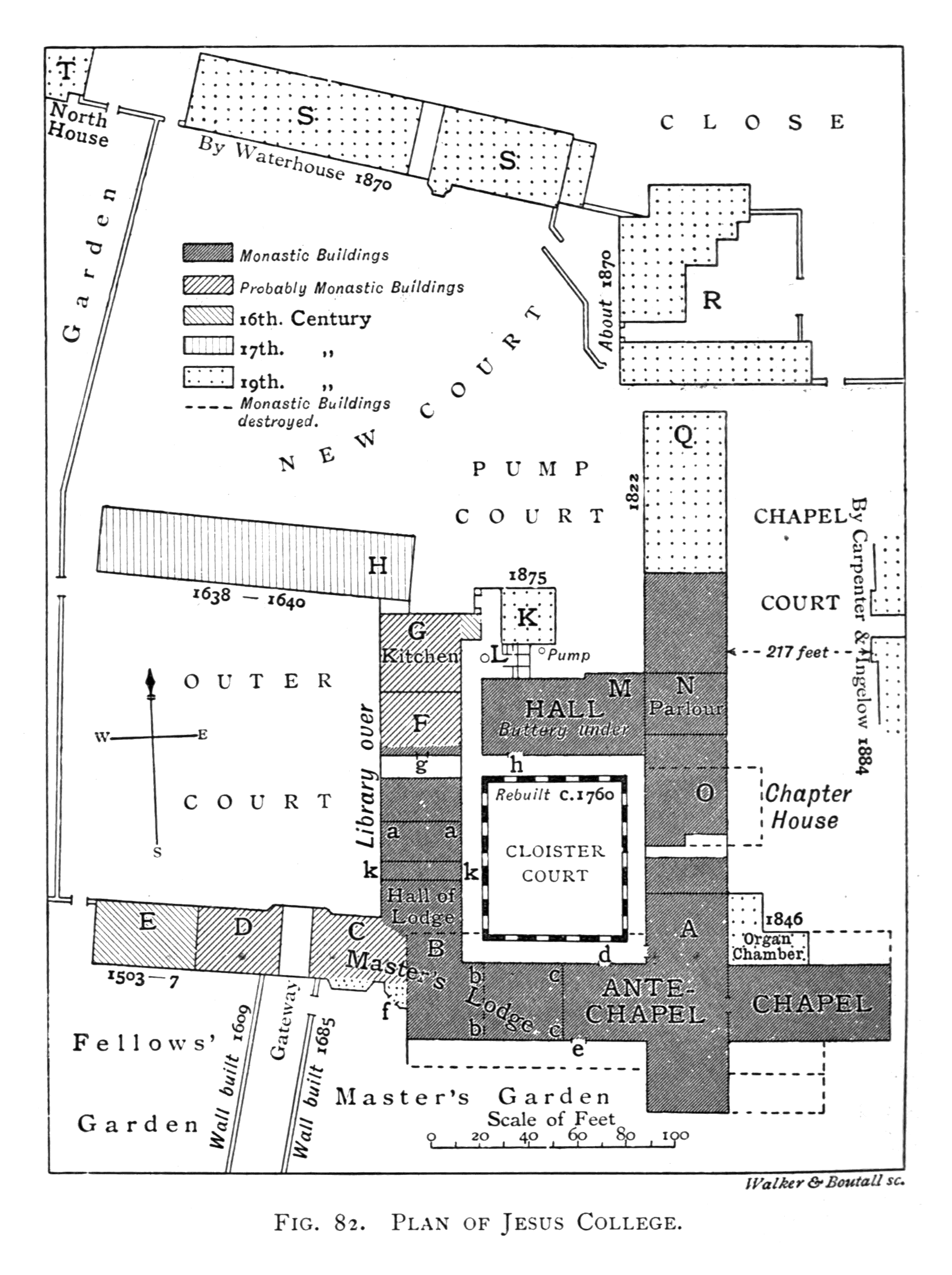
Historical plan of Jesus College (1897) showing the monastic buildings

St Radegund's Priory, Cambridge was a Benedictine nunnery in Cambridge, Cambridgeshire, England. It was founded before 1144 (probably in the late 1130s) and dissolved in 1496 by the initiative of John Alcock, Bishop of Ely.

== History ==
Radegund was a 6th-century Frankish princess, who founded the monastery of the Holy Cross at Poitiers in France. Between 1159 and 1161, Malcolm IV of Scotland, as Earl of Huntingdon, gave to the nuns 10 acres adjoining Grenecroft (Midsummer Common) on which to place their church; the dedication to St Mary and St Radegund was probably connected with Malcolm's visit to Poitiers, "the special centre of the cult of St Radegund", in 1159.

Jesus College was founded in 1496 on the site by Bishop John Alcock of Ely. It has been traditionally believed that the nunnery was turned into a college because the nunnery had gained a reputation for licentiousness. Contemporary churchman John Bale dubbed it "Spiritualium meretricum cœnobium" (lit. "a community of spiritual harlots"), while both King Henry VII and Pope Julius II consented to its dissolution.

The College's full name is "The College of the Blessed Virgin Mary, Saint John the Evangelist and the glorious Virgin Saint Radegund, near Cambridge".

When founded in 1496, the College took over the buildings of the nunnery: namely the Chapel, and the Cloister attached to it; the nuns’ refectory, which became the College Hall; and the former lodging of the prioress, which became the Master’s Lodge. These conventual buildings remain the core of the College, and account for a distinctly monastic character which sets it apart from other Cambridge colleges. A library was soon added, and the Chapel was considerably modified and reduced in scale by Alcock. Founded in the mid-12th century, the Chapel is the oldest university building in Cambridge still in use.
