= Cambridgeshire Lodes =

Man-made waterways in Cambridgeshire, England

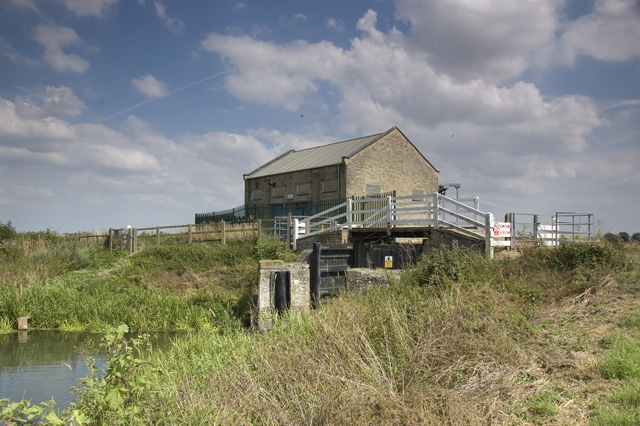
- The pumping station and flood gates at the end of Bottisham Lode

Specifications
- Locks: 2
- Status: Some Navigable
- Navigation authority: Environment Agency

History
- Original owner: Drainage Commissioners
- Date of act: none
- Date of first use: Roman period onwards

Geography
- Connects to: River Cam, River Great Ouse

The Cambridgeshire Lodes are a series of man-made waterways, believed to be Roman in origin, located in the county of Cambridgeshire, England. Bottisham, Swaffham Bulbeck, Reach, Burwell, Wicken and Monks Lodes all connect to the River Cam, while Soham and Cottenham Lodes connect to the River Great Ouse. All have been navigable historically, but some are no longer officially navigable.

Bottisham Lode was navigated throughout the 19th century, and although the flood gates at its mouth were replaced in 2001, it carries a "No unauthorised vessels" notice. Swaffham Bulbeck Lode has been rendered unnavigable by the removal of the lower lock gates, and the replacement of the upper lock gates with a guillotine gate which provides little headroom. Reach Lode is quite deep, as a result of the surrounding land sinking, and the banks being built up. The lower gate of the entrance lock has been replaced by a guillotine gate, enabling boats up to 63 feet (19 m) long to use it.

Burwell Lode is a tributary of Reach Lode, and is another deep lode. Barges were built and maintained at Burwell until 1936, and it was used commercially until 1963, when carriage of sugar beet ceased. Wicken Lode is another tributary of Reach Lode, and was important for the carriage of peat and sedge. It runs through Wicken Fen, one of the oldest nature reserves in England, as the National Trust bought their first part of it in 1899. Soham Lode is more recent than most, probably dating from the 1790s. It ran by Soham Mere, a large inland lake which was drained in the late 18th century.

In 2007 a strategy plan considered options for the management of the lodes which included rebuilding most of them at a lower level, but concluded that maintaining the banks at the existing level was a better long-term solution.

== History ==
Research by the Royal Commission on Historical Monuments published in 1972 confirmed the work of Major Gordon Fowler of the Fenland Research Committee that the Cambridgeshire lodes were of Roman origin; they were excavated to provide navigation to a series of villages to the east of the River Cam, and probably also drainage of the surrounding fenland. The infrastructure was completed by the Car Dyke, which linked Waterbeach on the River Cam to the River Witham near Lincoln, some 73 miles (117 km) away.

The term "Lode" denoted a watercourse in Late Middle English, being derived from the Old English "lād," meaning way or course. It did not acquire its modern meaning of a vein of metal ore until the early 17th century.

=== Bottisham Lode ===
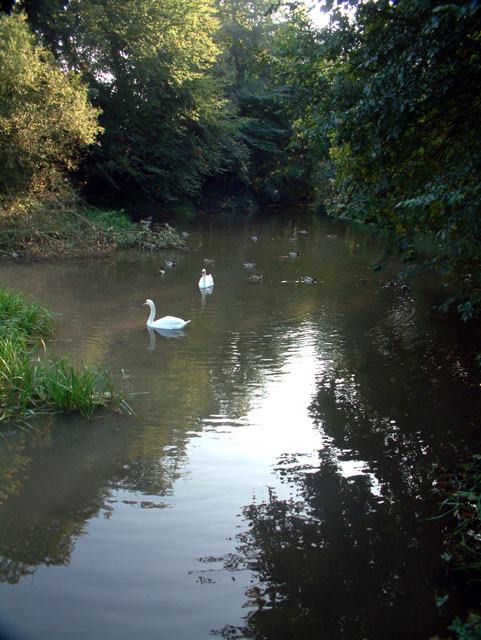
Quy Water

Bottisham Lode links the village of Lode to the River Cam just below Bottisham lock, and is about 2 1/2 miles (4.0 km) long. It is almost straight, running between embankments, and included a staunch (a primitive lock with a single gate), of which the chamber survives. Its water supply comes from Quy Water, which flows through a mill just above the village before entering the lode near to the location of a basin and wharf. In medieval times, navigation along Quy Water was also possible, as there is evidence of moorings in the village of Quy. The Swaffham and Bottisham Drainage Commissioners were responsible for the lode from 1767, and were empowered to build staunches and collect tolls. The lode was never wide enough to take fen lighters, but smaller boats used it for most of the 19th century.

In the 1860s, mining of coprolite, to be used as a source of phosphate for improving agricultural land, was extensive in Cambridgeshire. Initially the industry thrived further to the south, but noticing the profits that farmers were making, the commissioners decided to renovate the lode. In 1871, they applied to the South Level Board for permission to scour the channel as it was in a bad state, and they noted that "parties in charge of Barges throw off the lock doors to enable them to get up the Lode." The South Level Board replied that if conditions did not improve those transporting coprolite on the lode might take their trade to Fulbourn railway station, with the loss of significant tolls, and in 1872 the construction of a staunch lock was agreed, which would be the same as those on the Brandon River (now known as the River Little Ouse). The cost of the project was £750.

In 1875, the Drainage Commissioners spent £294 (equivalent to £34,984 in 2023) on a flash lock, which had a flagstone floor, a chamber constructed of white bricks, a timber guillotine gate, and a mechanism for raising the gate made from cast-iron, supported by a timber frame. The chamber was 11 feet 9 inches (3.58 m) wide, and the mechanism included a winding drum with winding wheel, and cogwheels with ratchets. The timber frame was demolished in 1968 but the chamber still survives, some 1,010 yards (920 m) upstream from the entrance gates.

Navigation on the lode ceased around 1900, and it is not currently navigable. The mill at Lode has been restored to working order by its owners, the National Trust. The timber-framed building dates from the late eighteenth century and has a low breastshot waterwheel. The mill machinery was replaced in 1868 by W Rawlings, and the external cladding dates from the 1934 and 1978 restoration. There is a pumping station and a set of mitred flood doors at the entrance to the lode, which were replaced in 2001, but a "No unauthorised vessels" notice was displayed on the gates in 2008.

=== Swaffham Bulbeck Lode ===
Swaffham Bulbeck Lode joins the River Cam about 1 1/2 miles (2.4 km) below Bottisham Lode. It runs for 3 2/5 miles (5.5 km) to the hamlet of Commercial End, which was called Newnham until the early 19th century. Commercial End consists of a row of fine buildings, mainly dating from the late 17th and 18th century. The Commissioners of the Bedford Level were responsible for the drain during this period, and they cleared the channel and straightened the banks on several occasions in response to complaints. Use of the lode declined rapidly once the railways arrived in the area, and only the first 2 miles (3.2 km) to Slade Farm are currently navigable, as shallow water and low bridges prevent access beyond this point. There is a lock at the junction with the River Cam which can accommodate boats up to 96 by 15 feet (29.3 by 4.6 m), with a maximum draught of 2 feet (0.61 m). However, the Environment Agency have modified the upstream lock gate, in order to improve flood control, with the result that the headroom below the guillotine gate is too low for boats to enter the lode. The lower gates have also been removed.

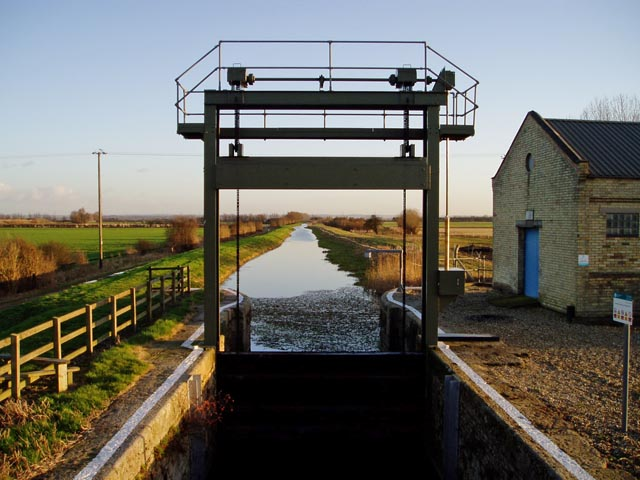
The lock at the junction between Swaffham Bulbeck Lode and the River Cam

=== Reach Lode ===
Reach Lode joins the River Cam at Upware, a further 2 1/3 miles (3.8 km) below Swaffham Bulbeck Lode, and runs for 3 miles (4.8 km) to the village of Reach. From Reach, a defensive rampart and ditch, called Devil's Dyke, ran for a further 7 1/2 miles (12.1 km) in a straight line to Ditton Green. The ditch is around 15 feet (4.6 m) deep and the rampart some 18 feet (5.5 m) high. It was built in the Anglo-Saxon period, and is listed as a Scheduled Ancient Monument, while the chalk grasslands which it contains have resulted in it being a designated Site of Special Scientific Interest (SSSI).

The village of Reach has been a trading port since Roman times. From the 13th century, a fair was held there, and it was at this time that the last 300 yards (270 m) of the Devils Dyke were levelled. Wharfs and basins were developed, and coasters brought a wide variety of products to Reach and to the fair. The coasters stopped when Denver Sluice was built on the River Great Ouse, but smaller vessels continued to trade in agricultural produce, timber and a type of building material called clunch, which were exported through Kings Lynn, while incoming trade included building materials, stone, salts, wines and spirits. A lock was built at the start of the lode in 1821, as a result of the passing of the Eau Brink Act, while the South Level Commissioners took over responsibility for the waterway in 1827. Trade declined rapidly after railways reached the area in the 1850s, but some carriers continued to operate, with the last load of 525 tonnes of clunch being shipped in the early 1930s, and some peat being carried for a few years after that.

Upware Lock, at 50 feet 0 inches by 13 feet 5 inches (15.24 m × 4.1 m), used to restrict the size of boats that could use the lode, and boats longer than 45 feet (14 m) could not be turned at Reach. However, the mitre gates at the downstream end have been replaced by a guillotine gate, enabling boats up to 63 feet (19 m) to gain access, and turning at Reach with a 58-foot (18 m) boat is possible. The lode is quite deep, for the surrounding land has sunk as the peat soils have dried out, and raising of the banks has resulted in the water being up to 10 feet (3.0 m) deep in places. In 2007 the Environment Agency considered options for lowering the level of Reach Lode and possibly some of the other lodes, as a way to reduce the maintenance of the banks. The report concluded that maintaining them at their present level was still the best solution, and a policy of strengthening the embankments was adopted as the way to limit the risk of major repairs being needed in the future.

The Reach annual fair, which received a charter from King John, has been moved to the May bank holiday from its original Rogation Week date, to ensure that every Mayor of Cambridge, who by tradition opens the fair, gets to open one fair during a term of office. The movable date of Rogation Week meant that some mayors opened two fairs, and some did not open any.

=== Burwell Lode ===
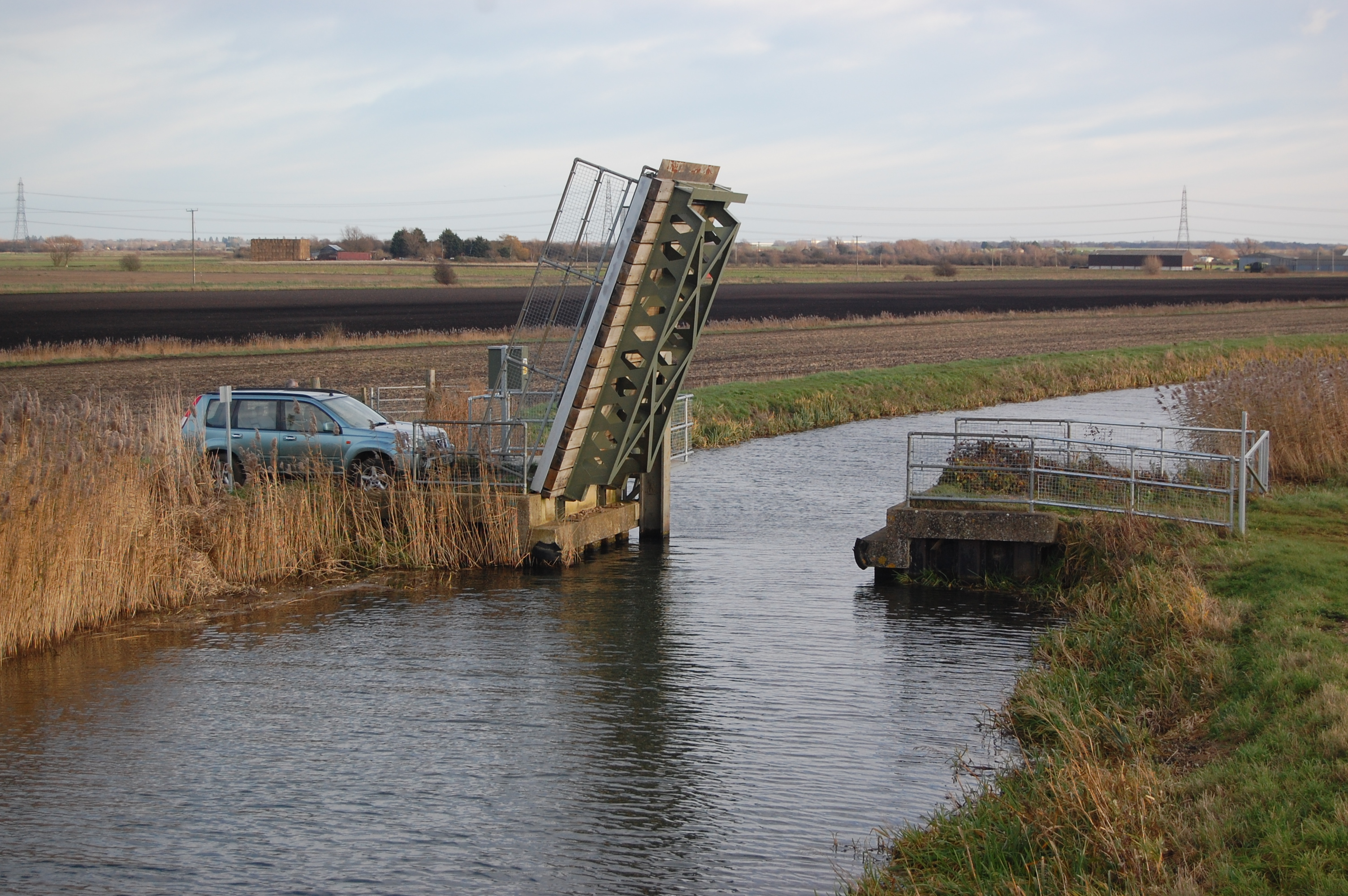
'Cockup Bridge' over Burwell Lode near Wicken Fen, in December 2013. There are plans to replace this lifting bridge with a fixed bridge.

Burwell Lode runs from the village of Burwell and joins Reach Lode about 3/4 mile (1.2 km) from the River Cam. The present course of the Lode was cut in the mid seventeenth century, replacing the previous course, which was referred to as the Old Lode. At Burwell, two branches diverge in opposite directions, both of which had wharves. 'Anchor Straits' to the south was used by coasters and 'Weirs' to the north was used by lighters.

Burwell became more important than Reach when T. T. Ball opened the Burwell Chemical Works, which was built between 1864 and 1865. Fertilizer was produced from coprolites, ancient fossilised dung extracted from the newly drained fens, using a process which had been developed by a man who lived locally. The works became the Patent Manure Works in the 1890s, and following a partnership, was owned by Colchester and Ball, who ran a fleet of three steam tugs and a large number of lighters, which were carrying around 10,000 tons a year by the early 20th century, despite the fact that the works had been served by a railway siding since 1900. Richard Ball had opened a brickworks nearby, which was served by a channel which became known as Factory Lode.

Prentice Brothers Ltd, who had built barges at Burwell until 1920, and repaired and maintained them there until 1936, took over the Manure Works in 1921. In addition to the fertilizer, the barges carried coal, stone and sugar beet, and the yellow bricks produced by the Burwell Brick Company. The toll structure was complicated, as the South Level Commissioners were responsible for both Burwell Lode and Reach Lode, but tolls of 3 pence (1.2p) per ton were payable to the Burwell Fen Drainage Commissioners, and a further 3 pence per ton for use of the connecting stretch of Reach Lode had to be paid to the Swaffham and Bottisham Drainage Commissioners.

The fertilizer company Fisons took over the factory in 1929. Prentice's lighters were bought by A. V. Jackson in 1936, and Jacksons continued to carry fertilizer until 1948. Trade in sugarbeet continued until 1963. Production of fertilizer at the site ceased in 1962, and the brickworks, which made up to 10 million bricks a year, finally closed in 1971.

The waterway is comparatively wide, at 40 to 45 feet (12 to 14 m), and the junction of the branches at Burwell provides a point at which long boats can be turned, but the modern lock at Upware restricts access to boats less than 63 feet (19 m) long. It is also quite deep, and the 2007 Strategy Study considered the option of reconstructing it at a lower level, but did not recommend this action.

=== Wicken Lode ===
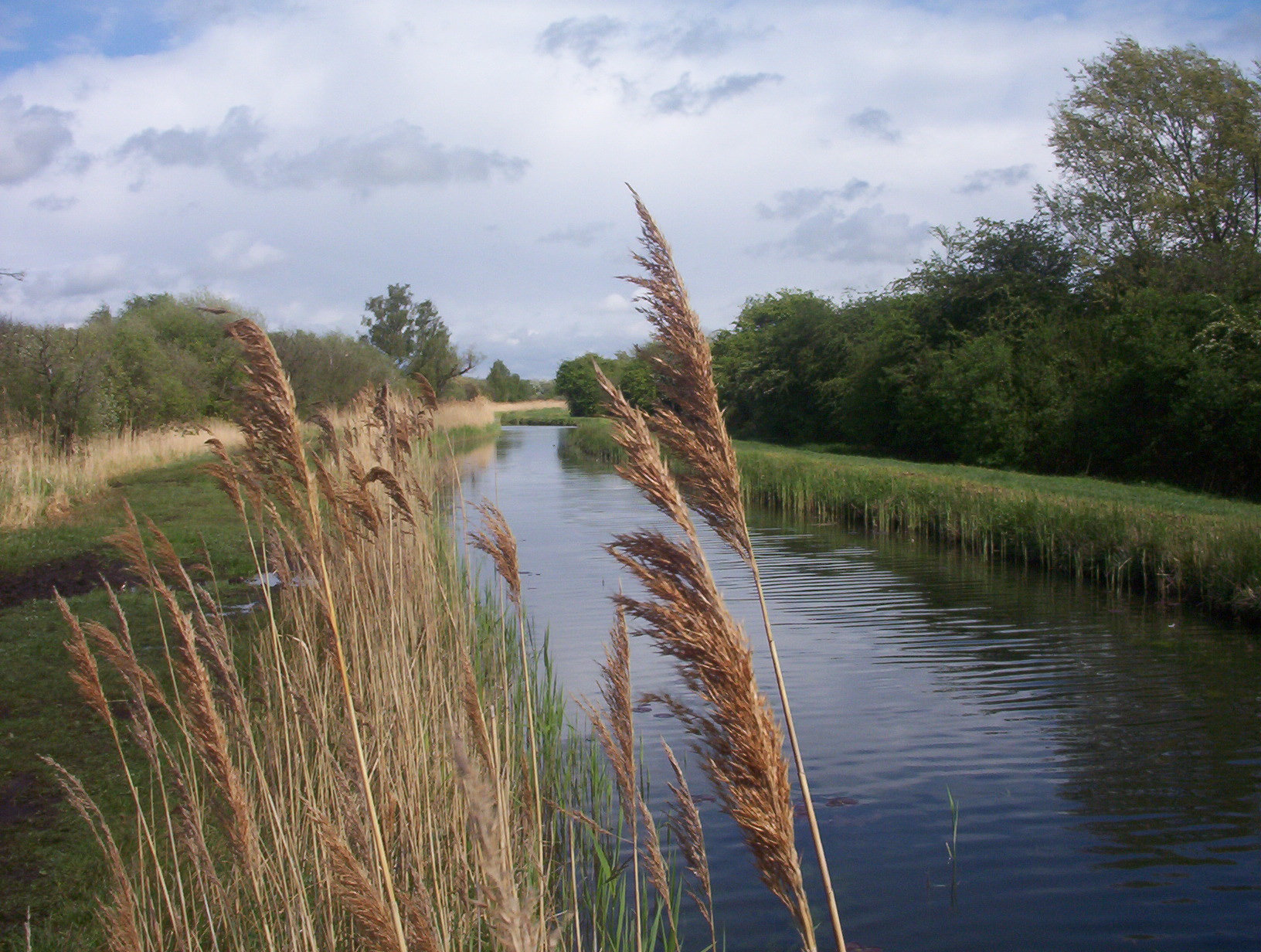
Wicken Lode

Wicken Lode turns off Reach Lode, and crosses Wicken Sedge Fen, running for nearly + 1/2 mile (0.80 km) to just short of the village of Wicken. There is a right of public navigation as far as its junction with Monk's Lode, and the stretch beyond that is only navigable by local inhabitants. The lode is not as wide or deep as the adjacent lodes, and can only be navigated by smaller craft. The waterway continues as Monk's Lode and then the New River, although these are not navigable. Peat from Burwell Fen was brought up Wicken Lode for much of the 19th century, for distribution to local farms, and the trade only stopped in the 1940s when peat cutting was restricted. Sedge from the fen was transported by boat from the sites where it was cut to a wharf near the head of the lode.

Wicken Fen is one of the oldest nature reserves in England, as the National Trust bought their first part of it in 1899. Purchases have continued, and the Trust now manages 730 acres (300 ha) of wetland. It is not a true fen, as the area is higher than the surrounding land, but since 1956 the wetland has been maintained by a drainage windmill pump which was moved from its location at Adventurers Fen, to the south of the lode, and re-assembled to supply the Fen with water. The National Trust Warden's office includes a display which tells the history of the Fen and how it has been managed.

=== Soham Lode ===
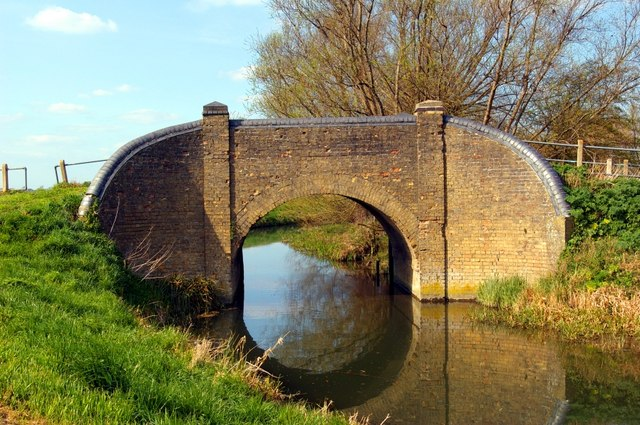
Barway Bridge crossing Soham Lode on a section that is still deep enough to navigate

Soham Lode runs for about 7 miles (11 km) from the River Great Ouse about 1 mile (1.6 km) below its junction with the River Cam. Its origin is less well known than the other lodes, but it probably dates from the 1790s, when it was built to reduce flooding in the Soham and Fordham area, by carrying water from the River Snail, which formerly flowed into the River Lark, to join the Great Ouse instead. Soham is about halfway along it, and was once close to a large inland lake called Soham Mere, which was drained in the late 18th century.

There is no evidence that the Lode was navigable beyond Soham. Lighters brought cargoes of corn to a water mill at Soham, and later brought coal when steam engines replaced the water wheel. Barley and timber were other important cargoes. Railways did not reach Soham until 1879, and resulted in the rapid demise of water-borne transport. Commercial traffic ceased about 1900, and the lode was described as un-navigable in a report by H. Dunn in 1906. There was a sluice at the entrance to the lode, with two sets of mitre gates, pointing in opposite directions, one to prevent flood waters from the Great Ouse entering the lode, and the other to raise the water level in the lode to make navigation easier. When the Anglian Water Authority was given navigation responsibilities by the Anglian Water Authority Act 1977 (c. i), the lode was not listed as a navigation, and their successors, the Environment Agency, have taken this to mean that there is no right of navigation.

There is now a pumping station and a set of mitred flood doors at the start of the lode, and although it is not officially navigable, two narrowboats navigated part of it in 2001, and there is increasing evidence that boats can and do use it as far as it is possible.

=== Cottenham Lode ===
Cottenham Lode has two branches, both of which empty in the Great Ouse. Previously the western branch was named Robbin's Lode, but now both carry the Cottenham Lode title.

== Points of interest ==
Point	Coordinates (Links to map resources)	OS Grid Ref	Notes
Mouth of Soham Lode	52.3641°N 0.2601°E	TL539764	
Soham Lode at Soham	52.3319°N 0.3404°E	TL595729	Below Brook Dam
Reach Lode lock	52.3056°N 0.2533°E	TL537698	
Reach Lode at Reach	52.2735°N 0.2927°E	TL565664	
Mouth of Wicken Lode	52.3032°N 0.2606°E	TL542696	
Wicken Lode jn with Monks Lode	52.3075°N 0.2864°E	TL559701	
Mouth of Burwell Lode	52.3000°N 0.2684°E	TL547693	
Swaffham Bulbeck Lode lock	52.2819°N 0.2304°E	TL527658	
Start of Swaffham Bulbeck Lode	52.2465°N 0.2750°E	TL554633	Commercial End
Mouth of Bottisham Lode	52.2695°N 0.2120°E	TL510657	
Bottisham Lode at Lode	52.2447°N 0.2409°E	TL530630	

== Bibliography ==
- Blair, Andrew Hunter (2006). The River Great Ouse and tributaries. Imray Laurie Norie and Wilson. ISBN 978-0-85288-943-5.
- Boyes, John; Russell, Ronald (1977). The Canals of Eastern England. David and Charles. ISBN 978-0-7153-7415-3.
- Cumberlidge, Jane (1998). Inland Waterways of Great Britain (7th Ed.). Imray Laurie Norie and Wilson. ISBN 0-85288-355-2.
- Grove, Richard (1976). "Coprolite Mining in Cambridgeshire". The Agricultural History Review. 24 (1): 36–43. ISSN 0002-1490. JSTOR 40273687.
- Halcrow (2007). "The Ely Ouse Lodes Strategy Study" (PDF). Halcrow Group Ltd and Environment Agency. Archived from the original (PDF) on 3 February 2011.
- Wareham, A F; Wright, A P M (2002). "A History of the County of Cambridge and the Isle of Ely: Volume 10". British History Online.

== See also ==
Media related to Cambridgeshire Lodes at Wikimedia Commons

- Canals of Great Britain
