= Burwell, Cambridgeshire =

Village in Cambridgeshire, England

Coordinates: 52°16′35″N 0°19′38″E

Burwell
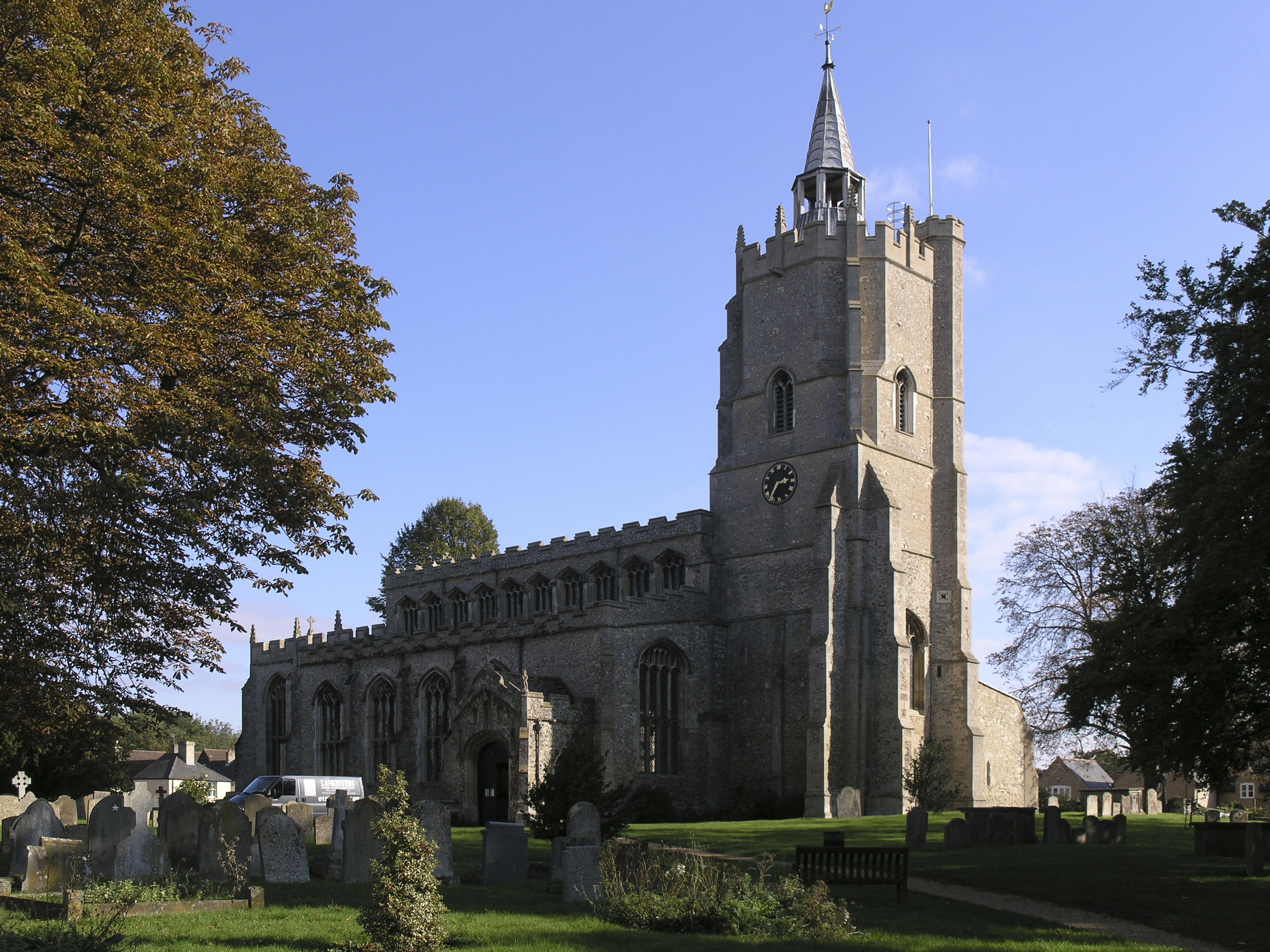
- St Mary's Church, Burwell, a Grade I listed building dating from the 12th century

- Location within Cambridgeshire
- Area: 24.7 km^{2} (9.5 sq mi)
- Population: 6,309 (2011)
  - Density: 255/km^{2} (660/sq mi)
- OS grid reference: TL589665
  - London: 56.6 mi (91.1 km) SSW
- Civil parish: Burwell
- District: East Cambridgeshire
- Shire county: Cambridgeshire
- Region: East
- Country: England
- Sovereign state: United Kingdom
- Post town: Cambridge
- Postcode district: CB25
- Dialling code: 01638
- Police: Cambridgeshire
- Fire: Cambridgeshire
- Ambulance: East of England
- UK Parliament: SE Cambridgeshire
- Website: Parish Council

Burwell /ˈbɜːrwɛl/ is a village and civil parish in Cambridgeshire, England, some 10 miles (16 km) north-east of Cambridge. It lies on the south-east edge of the Fens. Westward drainage is improved by Cambridgeshire lodes (waterways), including Burwell Lode, a growth factor in the village. A population of 6,309 in the 2011 census was put at 6,417 in 2019.

== History ==
=== Toponymy ===
The name "Burwell", Anglo-Saxon in origin, refers to a fort (burh-) close to a spring (-well). The first record of the name dates from 1060. It appears in the 1086 Domesday Book as Burewelle, Burwella and Burwelle. There is a spring in the south of the village, close to remains of the 12th-century Burwell Castle, and evidence of previous settlement on or near the castle site.

Old maps sometimes name the village in the plural, "Burwells". which may refer to a pair of parishes: Burwell St Mary and Burwell St Andrew, or to a distinction between the High Town round the churches in the south of the village and the newer North Street and Newnham parts, separated by a causeway.

=== Early settlement ===
There is evidence of prehistoric human activity in the vicinity of Burwell. Flint tools such as axes dating from the Palaeolithic and Mesolithic have been found on the west side of the village. Other burned and worked flint has been found close to the spring, dating from the late Neolithic, but most of the activity in the area at the time seemed to have been on the fen to the west of the village, where a large number of flint and stone tools discovered on a raised piece of ground suggest there was already settlement before the onset of the Bronze Age. During the Neolithic, peat began to form on the fenland round the village, which partly buried the prehistoric sites.

Activity on the fen continued into the Bronze Age, as did activity close to the spring but they were joined by increasing activity on the heath in the south of the parish, where barrows are known to have existed. The southern part of the parish is also the highest ground within it, and is close to the ancient Icknield Way.

As Burwell entered the Iron Age, activity on the fens to the west appears to have decreased as the conditions became more marshy. However, ditch systems and enclosures were found there during excavations in 1969 and 1995. Activity near the spring continued, with evidence of a burial in a nearby ditch. Settlement was revealed in 2005 on the eastern edge of the village. A pair of cropmarks a short distance east of the village may be the result of the below ground remains of Iron Age square barrows.

Settlement close to the spring continued after Roman colonisation of Britain. Evidence has been found 500 yards (460 m) north of St Mary's Church. Roman archaeological remains have been found round the village, including pottery, vessels and bowls, a lead vat, and coins perhaps relating to a villa in Ness Road, north of the village. Evidence of another villa in the same area comes in roof tiles from the 2nd century CE, although findings here and there cover the 2nd to 4th centuries. Reach Lode on the north-west edge was probably of Roman construction, as was the original Burwell Lode, since been replaced.

=== Waterway ===
The village is located at the head of Burwell Lode, a human-made waterway that connects it with the River Cam. The present course, laid out in the mid-17th century, replaced an older route that was probably Roman in origin. The lode splits in two at the village, each branch serving a series of basins, warehouses and wharves located at the bottom of long strips of land, with merchants' houses at the far end of them.

The village and lode gained importance with the opening in the 1850s of the Burwell Chemical Works owned by T. T. Ball. By the 1890s, this had become the Patent Manure Works owned by Colchester and Ball. About 10,000 tons of goods a year were shipped along it, using three steam tugs and a fleet of lighters. Prentice Brothers Ltd built barges in the village until 1920, and continued repairing them there after they bought the fertiliser factory in 1921. The factory was later owned by Fisons. Boats continued to be used to move the fertiliser to Fenland farms until 1948. Commercial use of the lode ceased in 1963, when the traffic in sugar beet stopped.

=== Burwell Castle ===
The village is the site of an unfinished castle in Spring Close, (Note: grid reference TL587661) whose final wall was knocked down by the Fire Brigade testing a fire hose in the 1930s, but whose dry moat is still visible. It was built during "The Anarchy", the mid-12th-century conflict in the reign of King Stephen. Despite a settlement that the throne would pass to Henry II on Stephen's death, the Barons took the opportunity to fight their own battles. Of these, Geoffrey de Mandeville was notably troublesome. After turning against Stephen, he set up an impregnable base around Ely, from which he attacked towns such as Cambridge. So the king ordered castles be built to surround him. The few known potential sites of these included Rampton (Giant's Hill), Ramsey (Booth's Hill), Burwell, and possibly Knapwell.

At Burwell, the castle was still under construction when Geoffrey attacked and was mortally wounded. His revolt then collapsed and the castle was left unfinished, leaving large spoil heaps from the earthworks. The narrow lane along the side of the church next to Spring Close, where the Castle stood, is named Mandeville.

=== Barn Fire ===
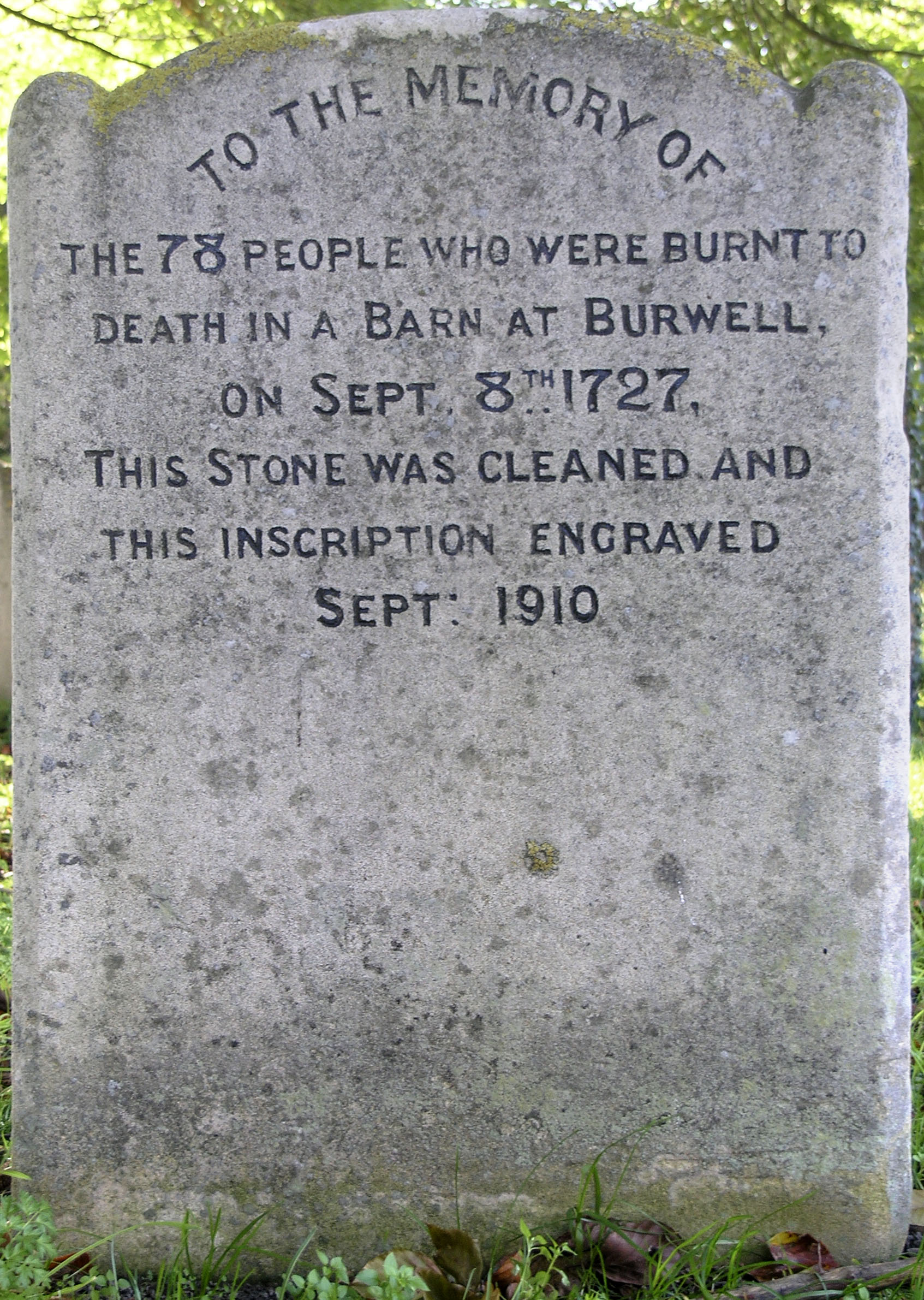
Burwell barn fire memorial - obverse

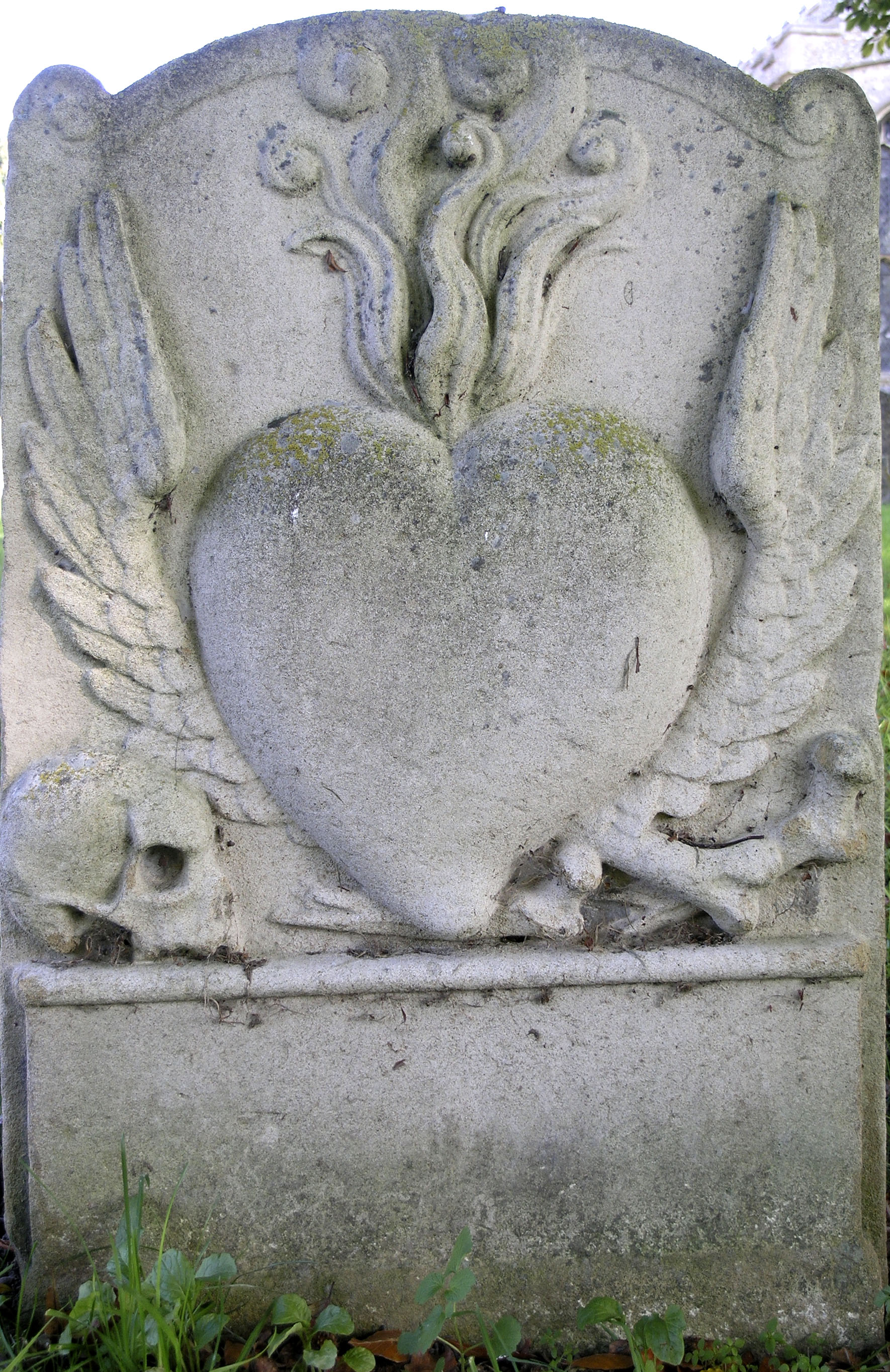
Barn fire memorial - reverse

On 8 September 1727, a travelling puppet show was filled with onlookers in a Burwell barn in what is now Cuckolds Row, near the centre of the village. The doors were nailed shut to stop further people getting in, an act that led to tragedy. Richard Whittaker, a hostler employed by the owner of the barn came back to feed the horses. He seems to have expected to be admitted free but was not. He made his way to the stable, clambered over a partition with a candle lantern and peered in to watch. The candle set fire to the hay within. It was reported that with no way to escape, 80 of the 140 people inside perished in the ensuing blaze. Whittaker was tried at Cambridge Assizes in 1728, but acquitted.

The Newcastle Courant reported on the fire

Newmarket, Sept. 11 In my last to you, giving the melancholly Account, of what happened at Burwell, I mentioned a Boy, that carried a Lanthorn into a Place, where there was a great Deal of Hay and Straw next the Barn; but I am since informed, that there was a Man with him, who beat the Lathorn about, and would not strive to put out the Fire, but run away, and left it burning; the man is apprehended, and committed to Cambridge Castle: The Andrew that belonged to the Show got out, but almost burned to Death, and lived but a Day and Night; he desired to see the Man that the Boy impeached and as soon as he saw him, he said, That was the Man that told him he would set the Barn Fire over their Heads, if he did not let him in to see the Sight for Nothing. There was a Floor above them, and the Fire got into the false Roof, and run like Wild-Fire above them; and the Floor fell and smothered all the poor Souls in 3 or 4 Minutes: I am told by several People since, that there is an Account of 120 Men, Women and Children burnt.

At the Assizes at Cambridge, one Richard Whiteker, charged upon suspicion of setting fire to a Barn in Burwell, in which about 125 Persons that were in it to see a Puppit Shew were burnt or otherwise destroy'd, was try'd and acquitted of the Fact.

The victims were buried in the churchyard of St Mary's, at the opposite end of the High Street, beneath a stone engraved with a blazing heart and angels' wings. An inscription on the reverse, added in 1910 when the stone was restored, states: "To the memory of the 78 people who were burnt to death in a barn at Burwell on Sept 8th 1727." Inside the church is a separate memorial to two other victims, John and Ann Palmer. On 8 September 2005, a memorial plaque was unveiled at the site of the fire.

The Ipswich Journal of 26 February 1774 reported how "an old man who died recently near Newmarket who just before his death confessed that he set fire to a barn at Burwell, Cambridgeshire on the 8th of September 1727 when no less than 80 persons lost their lives and that having an antipathy to the puppet showman was the cause of him committing the action." That man was Richard Whittaker.

== Governance ==
Burwell is a parish and thus has a parish council to deal with matters within the village. These include the maintenance and provision of both village halls, the recreation ground, playgrounds, and allotments. The Parish Council convenes at the Jubilee Reading Room on The Causeway.

Burwell parish lies within Burwell ward and provides three councillors to East Cambridgeshire District Council, which convenes at The Grange, Ely. A larger Burwell electoral division provides one councillor to Cambridgeshire County Council, convening at Shire Hall in Cambridge.

The local government boundary has varied over the years. At parish level, the boundary followed Devil's Dyke through the neighbouring village of Reach, bisecting it until it was turned into a new parish in 1961. The other boundaries of Burwell parish have also changed slightly over the years, most clearly on the south-eastern edge, where part of it including some of Newmarket Racecourse passed to Newmarket when the boundary was adjusted to follow the A14 bypass in 1993. The boundaries with Newmarket and Exning parishes follow the boundary between the counties of Cambridgeshire and Suffolk.

As elsewhere in England, a system of Hundreds covered Cambridgeshire until the 19th century. Burwell included the south-west edge of Staploe Hundred, along with the nearby parishes of Chippenham, Fordham, Isleham, Kennett, Landwade, Snailwell, Soham and Wicken.

East Cambridgeshire District Council came into being in 1974 under the Local Government Act 1972. Before the reorganisation, Burwell had lain inside Newmarket Rural District since 1894. Between 1875 and 1894, this was part of a larger Newmarket Rural Sanitary District which also encompassed Moulton Rural District in neighbouring West Suffolk.

The boundaries of Cambridgeshire itself also changed over the years up to 1974. Before Huntingdon and Peterborough joined the county in 1974, Burwell fell within Cambridgeshire and Isle of Ely, covering the southern and eastern parts of today's county. Between 1888 and 1965, the village fell within a smaller administrative county of Cambridgeshire, covering only the southern part of the present one.

== Geography ==
=== Climate ===
Climate data for Cambridge University Botanic Garden, (Note: Weather station is located 0.8 miles (1.3 km) from the Cambridge city centre.) elevation: 13 m (43 ft), 1991–2020 normals, extremes 1914–present
Month	Jan	Feb	Mar	Apr	May	Jun	Jul	Aug	Sep	Oct	Nov	Dec	Year
Record high °C (°F)	15.7 (60.3)	18.8 (65.8)	23.9 (75.0)	27.9 (82.2)	34.0 (93.2)	35.0 (95.0)	39.9 (103.8)	36.9 (98.4)	33.9 (93.0)	29.0 (84.2)	21.1 (70.0)	16.0 (60.8)	39.9 (103.8)
Mean daily maximum °C (°F)	7.8 (46.0)	8.6 (47.5)	11.5 (52.7)	14.6 (58.3)	18.0 (64.4)	20.8 (69.4)	23.3 (73.9)	22.9 (73.2)	19.9 (67.8)	15.3 (59.5)	10.9 (51.6)	8.1 (46.6)	15.1 (59.2)
Daily mean °C (°F)	4.8 (40.6)	5.2 (41.4)	7.3 (45.1)	9.7 (49.5)	12.8 (55.0)	15.6 (60.1)	17.9 (64.2)	17.7 (63.9)	15.0 (59.0)	11.4 (52.5)	7.5 (45.5)	5.0 (41.0)	10.8 (51.4)
Mean daily minimum °C (°F)	1.7 (35.1)	1.7 (35.1)	3.1 (37.6)	4.7 (40.5)	7.5 (45.5)	10.5 (50.9)	12.6 (54.7)	12.5 (54.5)	10.2 (50.4)	7.4 (45.3)	4.2 (39.6)	1.9 (35.4)	6.5 (43.7)
Record low °C (°F)	−16.1 (3.0)	−17.2 (1.0)	−11.7 (10.9)	−6.1 (21.0)	−4.4 (24.1)	−0.6 (30.9)	2.2 (36.0)	3.3 (37.9)	−2.2 (28.0)	−6.5 (20.3)	−13.3 (8.1)	−15.6 (3.9)	−17.2 (1.0)
Average precipitation mm (inches)	47.2 (1.86)	35.9 (1.41)	32.2 (1.27)	36.2 (1.43)	43.9 (1.73)	52.3 (2.06)	53.2 (2.09)	57.6 (2.27)	49.3 (1.94)	56.5 (2.22)	54.4 (2.14)	49.8 (1.96)	568.4 (22.38)
Average precipitation days (≥ 1.0 mm)	10.7	8.9	8.1	7.9	7.4	8.7	8.4	8.7	8.1	9.5	10.5	10.3	107.3
Average relative humidity (%)	86.0	82.5	78.6	74.6	74.8	73.9	72.5	73.7	77.5	83.3	87.0	87.8	79.4
Source 1: ECA&D
Source 2: Weather.Directory

Climate data for Cambridge (NIAB) (Note: Weather station is located 3 miles (4.8 km) from the Cambridge city centre.), elevation: 26 m (85 ft), 1991–2020 normals, extremes 1959–present
Month	Jan	Feb	Mar	Apr	May	Jun	Jul	Aug	Sep	Oct	Nov	Dec	Year
Record high °C (°F)	15.4 (59.7)	18.3 (64.9)	23.9 (75.0)	26.9 (80.4)	33.4 (92.1)	33.5 (92.3)	39.9 (103.8)	36.1 (97.0)	32.0 (89.6)	29.3 (84.7)	18.3 (64.9)	16.1 (61.0)	39.9 (103.8)
Mean daily maximum °C (°F)	7.7 (45.9)	8.3 (46.9)	11.0 (51.8)	14.1 (57.4)	17.4 (63.3)	20.4 (68.7)	23.1 (73.6)	22.9 (73.2)	19.6 (67.3)	15.1 (59.2)	10.7 (51.3)	8.0 (46.4)	14.9 (58.8)
Daily mean °C (°F)	4.8 (40.6)	5.0 (41.0)	7.0 (44.6)	9.4 (48.9)	12.4 (54.3)	15.4 (59.7)	17.8 (64.0)	17.7 (63.9)	15.0 (59.0)	11.5 (52.7)	7.6 (45.7)	5.1 (41.2)	10.7 (51.3)
Mean daily minimum °C (°F)	1.9 (35.4)	1.8 (35.2)	3.1 (37.6)	4.6 (40.3)	7.4 (45.3)	10.5 (50.9)	12.6 (54.7)	12.6 (54.7)	10.5 (50.9)	7.9 (46.2)	4.5 (40.1)	2.2 (36.0)	6.7 (44.1)
Record low °C (°F)	−16.0 (3.2)	−15.3 (4.5)	−9.4 (15.1)	−5.9 (21.4)	−1.8 (28.8)	0.0 (32.0)	4.8 (40.6)	3.3 (37.9)	−0.6 (30.9)	−5.4 (22.3)	−8.9 (16.0)	−12.5 (9.5)	−16.0 (3.2)
Average precipitation mm (inches)	48.6 (1.91)	35.7 (1.41)	32.9 (1.30)	37.6 (1.48)	43.2 (1.70)	49.1 (1.93)	48.3 (1.90)	55.9 (2.20)	47.6 (1.87)	58.7 (2.31)	52.6 (2.07)	49.2 (1.94)	559.4 (22.02)
Average precipitation days (≥ 1.0 mm)	10.4	8.7	8.1	8.0	7.3	8.7	8.4	9.0	8.0	9.6	10.4	10.5	107.2
Mean monthly sunshine hours	57.2	77.8	118.4	157.2	182.7	182.5	190.0	181.3	144.0	110.3	67.6	53.7	1,522.7
Source 1: Met Office
Source 2: Starlings Roost Weather

=== Clunch quarry ===
Until the mid-20th century, a building material known as clunch – a soft rock which is one type of chalk limestone – was dug in Burwell. Remains of the open quarry can be seen either side of Bloomsfield. This was worked from 1252 to 1952 and used on many of the houses in Burwell. It remains the name of a local community magazine.

=== Priory Wood ===
Burwell has a small area of woodland planted in 1998 as a community project to mark the coming millennium. It is owned and maintained by the Woodland Trust. The official name comes from an ancient priory, which also gave its name to local roads such as Priory Close and Abbey Close.

== Population ==
Historical population of Burwell (Note: Figures up to and including 1951 include the part of Reach formerly in Burwell parish)
Year	1801	1811	1821	1831	1841	1851	1861	1871	1881	1891	1901
Population	1,250	1,324	1,518	1,668	1,820	2,187	1,987	2,106	1,949	1,998	1,974
Year	1911	1921	1931	1941	1951	1961	1971	1981	1991	2001	2011
Population	2,144	2,108	2,257	(Note: No census 1941 due to World War II)	2,364	2,734	4,032	4,257	4,531	5,833	6,309
Census: 1801–2001 2011

=== Notable people ===
In birth order:

- Geoffrey de Mandeville, 1st Earl of Essex (died 1144) was mortally wounded at Burwell in the rebellion against Stephen, King of England.
- Edward Fitzball (born Ball, 1792–1873), a London playwright specialising in melodrama, was born in Burwell.
- William Wickins (1862–1933), Anglican Archbishop of Calcutta and Honorary Chaplain to the King, was a curate in Burwell.
- Marjory Stephenson (1885–1948), a biochemist specialising in microbial metabolism, grew up in Burwell. She became one of the first two women members of the Royal Society in 1945.
- Eric Ennion (1900–1981), natural historian and broadcaster, was a GP in Burwell for 20 years.
- Thomas Malcolm Charlton (1923–1997), civil engineer and science historian, retired to Burwell in 1979.
- John Louis Mansi (1926–2010), actor, lived in Burwell in the 1980s.
- Lawrence Harvey (born 1972), formerly of the Turks and Caicos Islands national football team, has worked in Burwell as a quantity surveyor.

== Culture and community ==
=== Carnival ===
The village hosts an annual carnival in June, which raises money for charity. A parade travels from Margaret Field in the south of the village to the Recreational Ground, where stalls and fairground rides are present.

=== Twinning ===
The village is twinned with Lizy-sur-Ourcq and Mary-sur-Marne and with a small town, Ocquerre. All three are situated in France; Lizy is mentioned on signs as you enter the village. Visits from Burwell to the twins are organised by the Burwell Village Twinning Association.

A plate marking the twinning is located on a wall outside the Year 3 classroom at the village primary school, Burwell Village College (Primary).

=== Philanthropy ===
The villages holds an annual Christmas Eve fund raising event which is run by business executive James Pryor. The annual event raises money for local causes.

== Transport ==
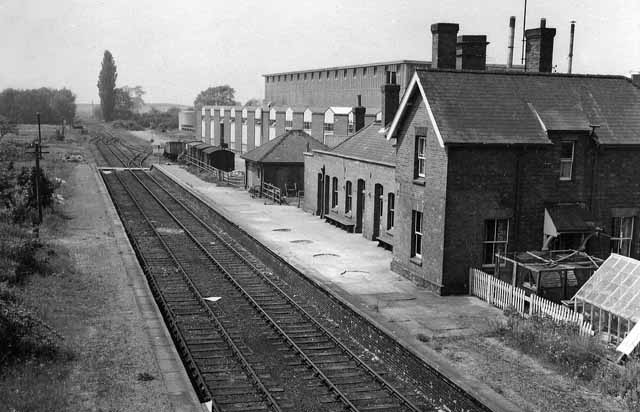
Burwell Station in 1963. Closed to passengers in 1962, goods in 1965.

Road access to Burwell is mainly along the B1102 Cambridge to Mildenhall road, which runs the length of the village, and the B1103, which links the village with Newmarket. The A14 passes along the southernmost edge of Burwell parish on the Cambridgeshire–Suffolk border, but cannot be joined without leaving the parish.

Since May 2025, public transport in the village is provided by bus services to Newmarket, Addenbrookes, Soham and Cambridge City Centre. These services are franchised by the Combined Authority and are run by Stagecoach and A2B Travel respectively.

Between 1884 and 1965, railway station, in the south of the village, was served by the Cambridge to Mildenhall railway. The station closed to passengers in 1962. Although nothing of it remains, its earlier presence is acknowledged in the names of the streets Railway Close and Station Gate. There was also a halt on Newmarket Road to the south-east of the village, where the B1103 still goes over a former railway bridge.

To the north of the village, temporary tramways provided access from the nearby Ipswich to Ely Line to the local brickworks, situated near the Lode.

Burwell Lode is navigable up to the edge of the village at Anchor Lane. The Lode joins Reach Lode in the north-west corner of the parish before they flow into the River Cam at Upware, 5 miles from Burwell.

== Education ==
Burwell contains a nursery, a Montessori and a playgroup for pre-school children. The old school house on the High Street, a listed building dating from 1864, is now a private residence.

Children attend Burwell Village College (Primary) up to the age of 11 and then go to secondary schools at either Soham or Bottisham.

=== Burwell Museum ===
The museum shows life through the centuries on the edge of the Cambridgeshire fens. Opened in 1992, it occupies a collection of buildings, some reconstructed from other sites, such as an 18th-century timber-framed barn, and others built in local style mainly with reclaimed materials, such as the wagon sheds/granary display area.

The displays are set out as "scenes" (resembling stage sets) with groups of artefacts making up each, to give an idea of how, where and when items were used. Themes and exhibits cover agriculture, period rooms and household items, military life, a blacksmith's shop, a reconstruction of a Roman potter's workshop, a Victorian school room, and vintage vehicles, carts and farm equipment.

The museum is a regular venue for school trips. Eight local schoolchildren appeared in 2012 in a TV programme about the Cambridgeshire fens that was filmed here.

The neighbouring Grade II*-listed windmill, Stevens' Mill, forms part of the museum and opens with it. It was probably built about 1820. It stayed in the Carter family until 1884, when it was sold to George Mason, who had been the tenant miller. By the 1920s, the mill, at one time powered also by steam, was owned by the Stevens family. When Warren Stevens retired in 1955, the mill became redundant and fell into disrepair. The Burwell Museum obtained funding of £400,000 from Heritage Lottery Fund to restore it.

== Religion ==
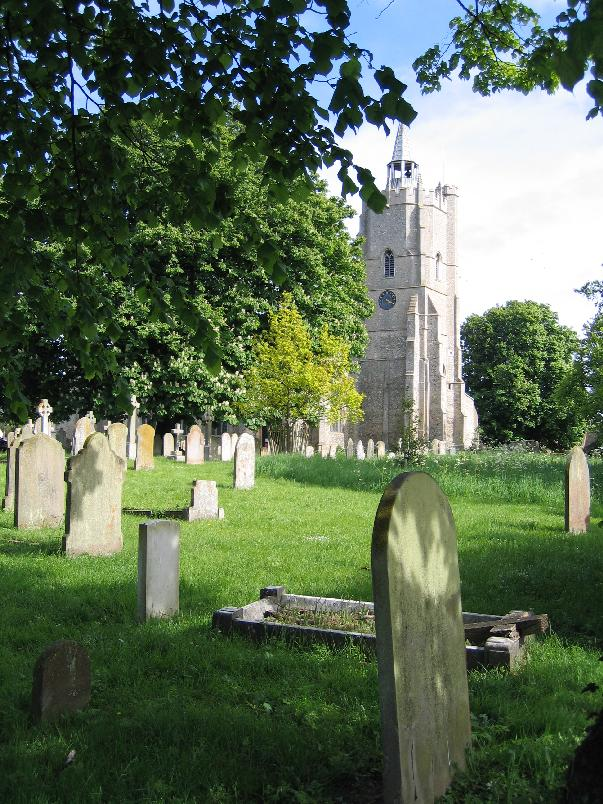
St Mary's Church, Burwell

Burwell has a large, Grade I-listed parish church in the High Street in the south of the village. Dedicated to St Mary the Virgin, the church is in Perpendicular Gothic style and dates back to the 15th century, although some parts are older.

From the 12th century until the mid-16th century, there was a second parish church across the road from St Mary's. This was dedicated to St Andrew, and its ruins, including a round tower, were pulled down in 1772.

At the northern end of the village, Burwell has a Baptist church.

Located near St Mary's, Trinity is a small church founded by a merger of the Methodist and United Reformed communities in 1988.

The nearest Roman Catholic church is Our Lady and St Etheldreda in Newmarket. The village has a number of former churches converted to other uses. The cemetery in Ness Road has a small non-denominational chapel.

== Sport ==
Burwell Swifts F.C. play football in Division 1A of the NMC Cambridgeshire Football League, with a reserve team in Division 3B.

Burwell Tigers F.C. play association football in Division 5A of the NMC Cambridgeshire Football League.

There are two youth football clubs: the Burwell Swallows and Burwell Tigers.

Burwell Cricket Club is based on Tan House Lane, with a 1st XI in the East Anglian Premier League.

== Media ==
The village has a community magazine, Clunch, dealing with news on a village level. The village is in the catchment areas of the Cambridge News and Newmarket Journal newspapers, and the radio stations BBC Radio Cambridgeshire and Heart East. For television Burwell is in the BBC East and ITV Anglia regions.

== See also ==
- HMS Burwell (H94)
