= Burwell Castle =

- Burwell, Cambridgeshire, England
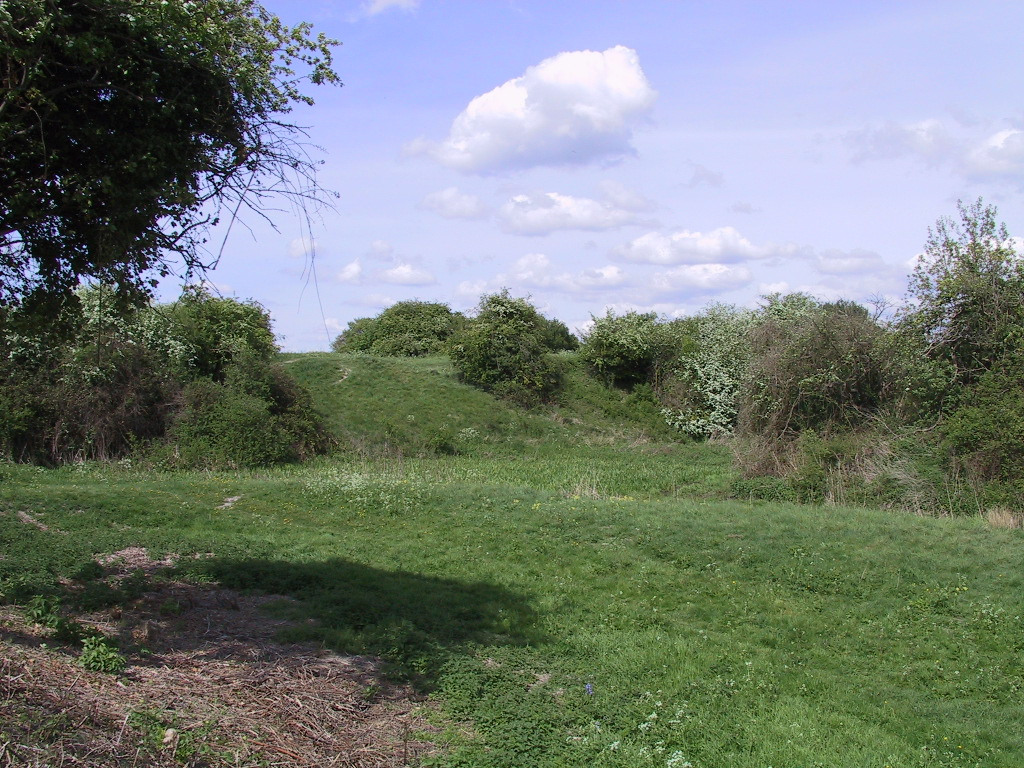
- Earthwork remains of Burwell Castle (May 2003)

Site information
- Type: Enclosure castle
- Owner: Burwell Parish Council
- Condition: Earthworks

Location
- Shown within Cambridgeshire
- Coordinates: 52.2693°N 0.3244°E
- Grid reference: grid reference TL587660

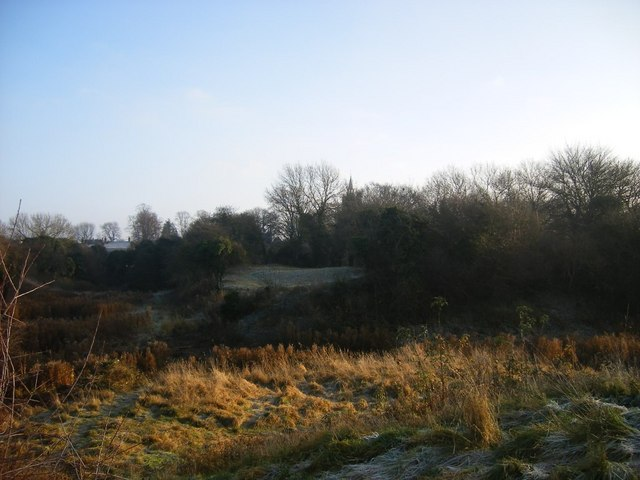
Burwell Castle Mound

Burwell Castle was an unfinished medieval enclosure castle in Burwell, Cambridgeshire, England.

== Details ==
Burwell Castle was built near the village of Burwell in 1143 by Stephen I of England, on the site of a former Roman villa. It was constructed during the civil war of the Anarchy, a long running dispute between the supporters of Stephen, and his Angevin rival, the Empress Matilda. The baron Geoffrey de Mandeville was dispossessed of his castles by Stephen and rose up in revolt immediately afterwards, taking up a position near Ely in the Fens and threatening Cambridge Castle and the route south to London; Burwell Castle was built as part of a chain of castles to protect the region, including fortifications at Lidgate, Rampton, Caxton, Swavesey and possibly Knapwell. Stephen appropriated the village of Burwell, which was constructed on a raised area of land of Roman origin, and proceeded to commence building the castle. It consists of a sub-rectangular mound measuring 60 by 30 metres (197 by 98 ft) and surrounded by a rectangular ditch up to 30 metres (98 ft) wide.

Geoffrey de Mandeville attacked Burwell in 1144 when the castle was still unfinished, but during the operation he was hit by a crossbow bolt; he retired to nearby Mildenhall, where he died from the injury. After Geoffrey's death the castle was never completed, although a stone gatehouse was completed on the site, suggesting a period of further occupation. The Abbot of Ramsey built a chapel on the site around 1246, and the site was finally abandoned in the 15th century.

The archaeologist T. C. Lethbridge excavated the site in 1935. At the time portions of stone walling survived but were later destroyed during testing of a fire hose. The castle site was bought by the Burwell Parish Council in 1983. The University of Exeter conducted a geophysical and topographical survey of the castle in the 2010s. Today only the unfinished earthworks remain of the castle, which have scheduled monument status.

== See also ==
- Castles in Great Britain and Ireland
- List of castles in England

== Bibliography ==
- Cambridgeshire Extensive Urban Survey: Burwell. Draft Report 22/05/2003. Cambridge: Cambridge County Council.
- Creighton, Oliver Hamilton. (2005) Castles and Landscapes: Power, Community and Fortification in Medieval England. London: Equinox. ISBN 978-1-904768-67-8.
- Malim, C. (2001) Burwell Castle, Cambridgeshire. Cambridge: Cambridgeshire County Council Archaeological Field Unit.
- Pettifer, Adrian. (2002) English Castles: a Guide by Counties. Woodbridge, UK: Boydell Press. ISBN 978-0-85115-782-5.
