= Wickins =

Wickins is a surname. Notable people with the surname include:

- David Wickins (1920–2007), English accountant and entrepreneur
- William Wickins (1862–1933), English divine, Archdeacon of Calcutta
