= St Mary's Church, Burwell =

Church in Cambridgeshire, England

Coordinates: 52°16′11″N 0°19′41″E

Saint Mary's Church, Burwell
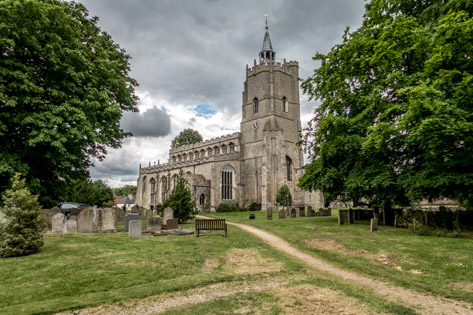
- Saint Mary's Church, Burwell
- Denomination: Anglican
- Previous denomination: Roman Catholic
- Website: Official website

Architecture
- Heritage designation: Grade I listed
- Architect: Workshop of Reginald Ely
- Style: Romanesque; Perpendicular Gothic
- Years built: 12th–15th centuries
- Completed: c.1477

Administration
- Archdiocese: Canterbury
- Diocese: Ely

Saint Mary's Church is an Anglican parish church in the village of Burwell, Cambridgeshire, England. While it incorporates parts of an earlier building, the present grand church is largely the product of the 15th century and is a Grade I listed building. The church forms a joint benefice with St Ethelreda's, Reach.

== History ==
The earliest part of the present building is 12th century. However, the church was almost entirely rebuilt in the mid-15th century, during John Higham's tenure as vicar (1439–67). Wills, funding bequests and inscriptions give some dates for the work. The north aisle was "newly begun" in 1454, the chancel arch has an inscription of 1464, and work to the tower in 1477 suggests that the building was completed around this time. Due to architectural similarities with King's College Chapel, particularly in the window tracery and niche canopies, the design has been ascribed to Reginald Ely, or his workshop. As the workmanship of the chancel is somewhat cruder than the nave, and it is later in date, the former may have been built by John Melford of Sudbury, Ely's former apprentice. Until the mid-16th century, Burwell had two churches; St Andrew's, across the street from St Mary's, has since entirely disappeared.

Little major work was done after the 15th century: most of the medieval fittings were destroyed in the Reformation and the English Civil War (when the church was 'visited' by the iconoclast William Dowsing), new pews were fitted c.1710, the spirelet was added in 1799, and the building was restored in 1861-61, 1868 and 1877 (the last by Reginald Blomfield).

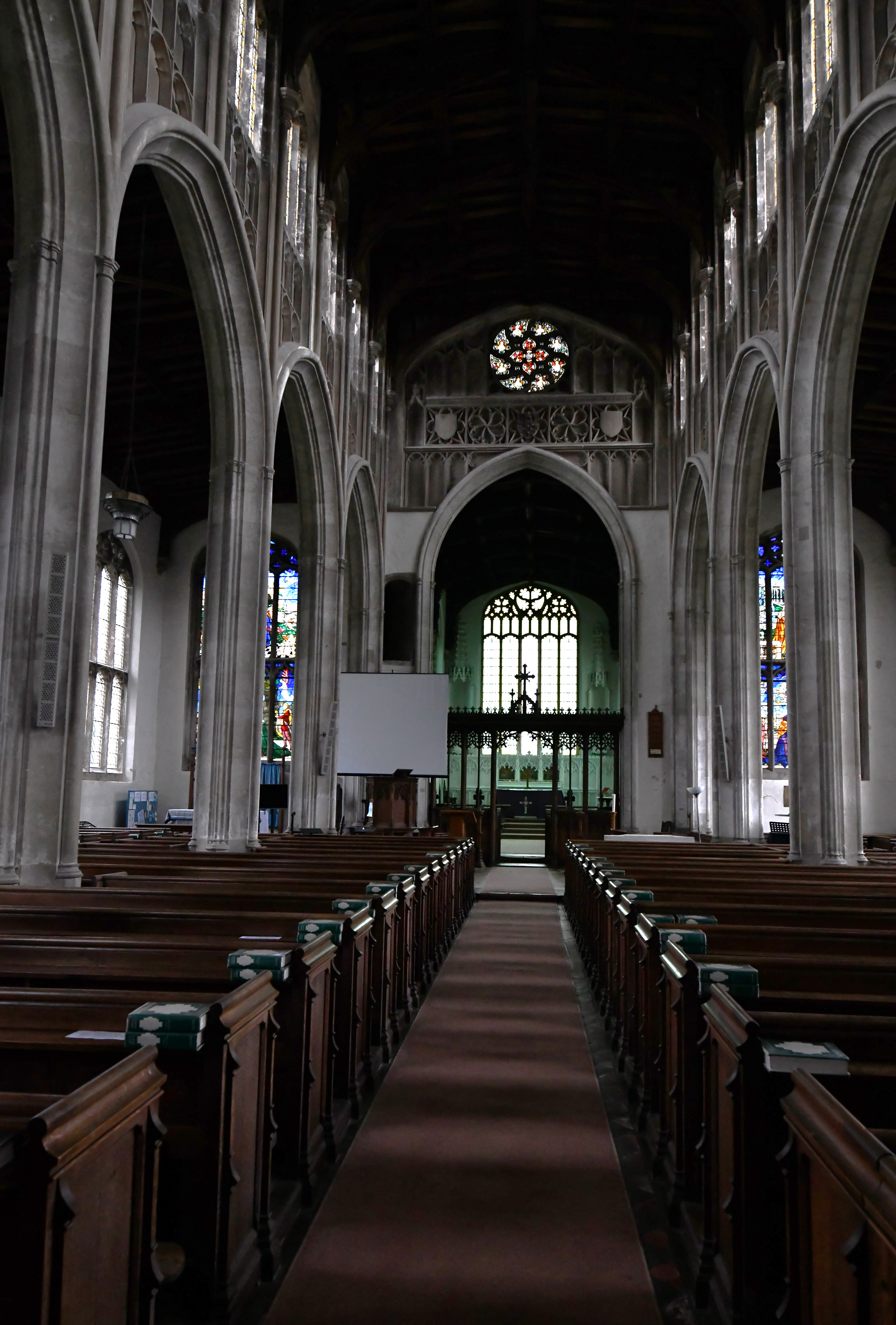
The nave interior looking east.

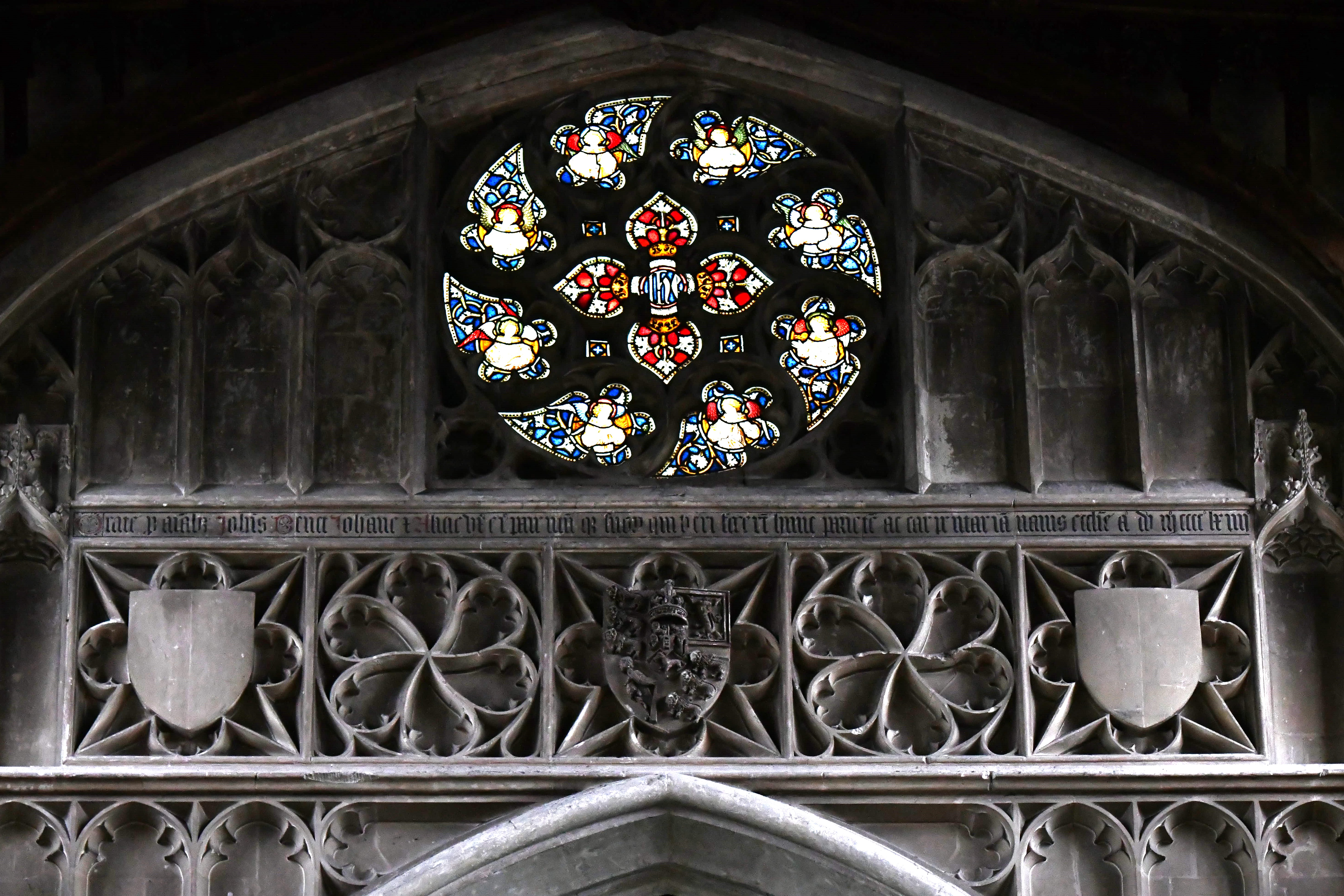
'Fantastic' mouchette wheels above the chancel arch.

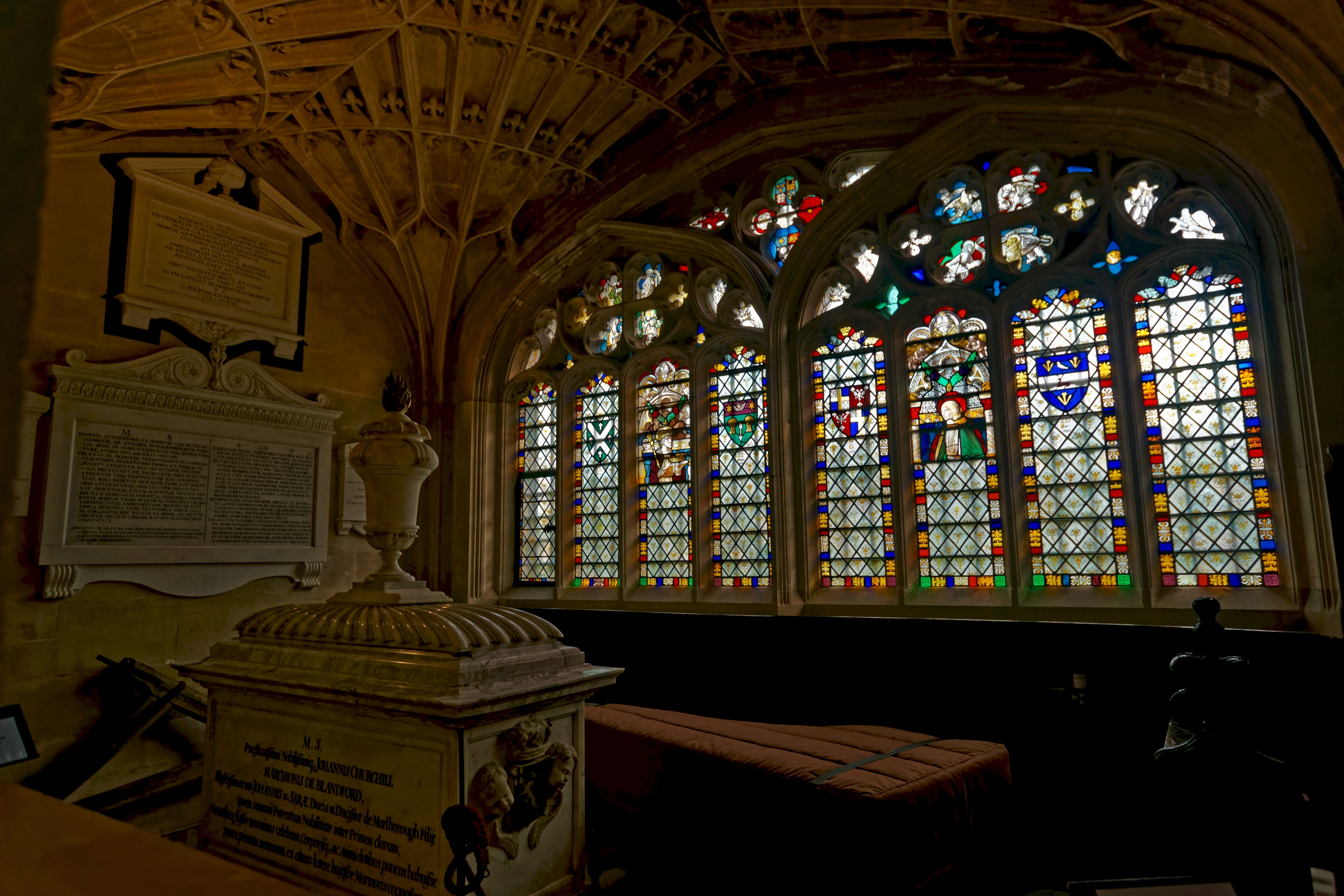
The side chapels at King's College feature similar tracery to the aisles at Burwell.

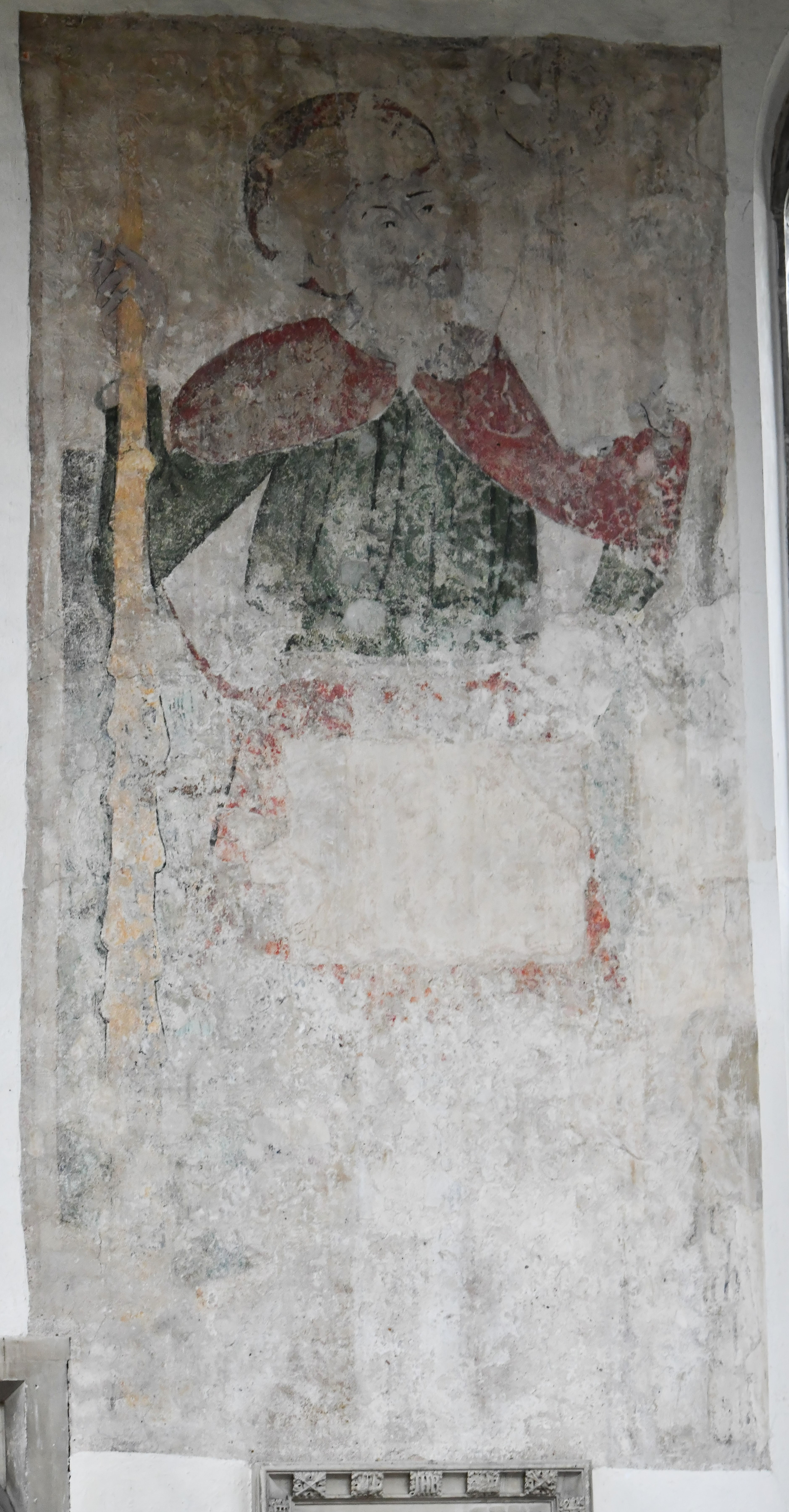
Wall painting of St Christopher

== Architecture ==
The church consists of an aisled nave of five bays, an aisleless chancel of three bays with a crypt under, north and south porches, a west tower with spirelet., and a south-west vestry. The exterior is built of flint rubble, while the interior is faced with clunch. The two lower stages of the tower survive from the 12th century church, and have blocked round-arched windows. The tower was buttressed in the 15th century, when it gained an additional three stages, octagonal like the lantern of Ely Cathedral and the more local towers at Swaffham Prior. The west end of the south aisle retains some work from the 14th century, with one window.

The work of the 15th century campaign is in a unified and elaborate style, part of what Francis Woodman termed the 'Fantastic' movement. This emanated from the court of Henry VI, and represented a reaction against the orthodox Perpendicular of the late 14th century. The style borrowed fanciful elements, like flowing tracery, from the French Flamboyant style (at a time when England controlled much of France), and can be seen at Eton College and Oxford Divinity School as well as King's. The wall above the chancel arch is a tour de force of stone panelling and heraldry combined with swirling Flamboyant mouchette (an asymmetrical teardrop shape) wheels, while the four-petalled flowers in the aisle windows became a popular form in the region. The clerestory is linked to the arcades by panelling descending from the mullions, in a more orthodox Perpendicular manner. This unified panelling became popular across East Anglia (e.g. at Long Melford and Great St Mary's, Cambridge) but Burwell is believed to be the earliest example in a parish church. On the north wall is a faded 15th century wall painting of St Christopher carrying the infant Christ, an image that was believed to grant protection to those who saw it. The porches are both 15th century. That to the north has a fan vault and a finely carved inner doorway.

The chancel is more austere, and the masonry was considered by Woodman to be of somewhat lower quality. It is distinguished by tall canopied niches between the windows, with miniature vaults in the canopies. Among them, two on the south are very similar to one from the first phase of work at King's. The niches rest on carved angels, renewed in Victorian times. Below the east bay of the chancel, the crypt is a simple affair to account for the falling ground. It is accessed by steps to the north of the high altar, and is roofed with a clunch barrel vault of low pitch.

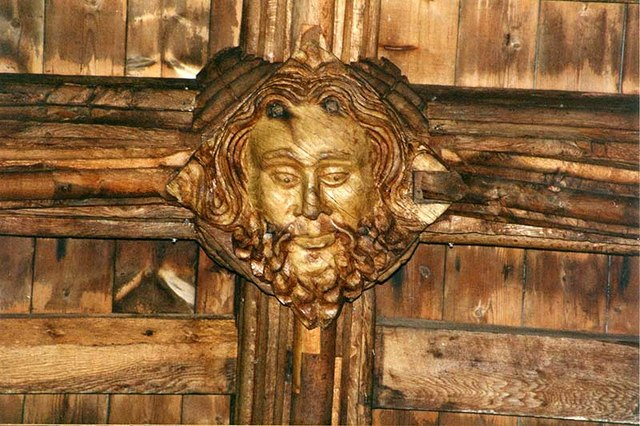
Carved roof boss

=== Roofs ===
The church has original roofs throughout. That to the chancel has arch braces, alternately resting on angel corbels and the niche canopies. The aisle and south porch roofs also have angel corbels. Unusually, the low-pitched nave roof is supported by beasts instead of angels.

== Furnishings ==
=== Font ===
The font is octagonal, and contemporary with the church rebuilding.

=== Screen ===
The lower part of the rood screen is 15th century, with similar tracery patterns to the church windows. The upper part dates from the 1877 restoration.

=== Monuments ===
The most important monument is the brass in the middle of the chancel floor, to John Lawrence de Wardeboys (died 1542). He was the abbot of Ramsey until its dissolution in 1539, and his brass is a palimpsest of brasses salvaged from Bury St Edmunds Abbey. On the rear are parts of the figures of a 16th century canon and a 14th century deacon.
