= Rampton Castle =

Castle site in Rampton, Cambridgeshire, England

Coordinates: 52.29147°N 0.0961°E

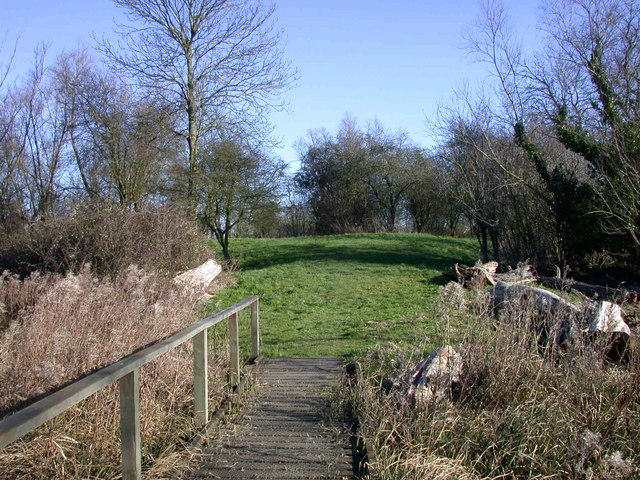
Giant's Hill

Rampton Castle, known locally as Giant's Hill, is the earthwork remains of a motte and bailey castle in Rampton, Cambridgeshire. It is believed that the castle was constructed during The Anarchy by the forces of King Stephen to contain the revolt of Geoffrey de Mandeville. The castle was not completed; construction was probably halted by de Mandeville's death at nearby Burwell Castle in 1144. Sited near to the churchyard of All Saints' Church, the castle is thought to have been built over the eastern end of the medieval village.
