= Reach, Cambridgeshire =

Village in Cambridgeshire, England

Coordinates: 52.27°N 0.3°E

Reach
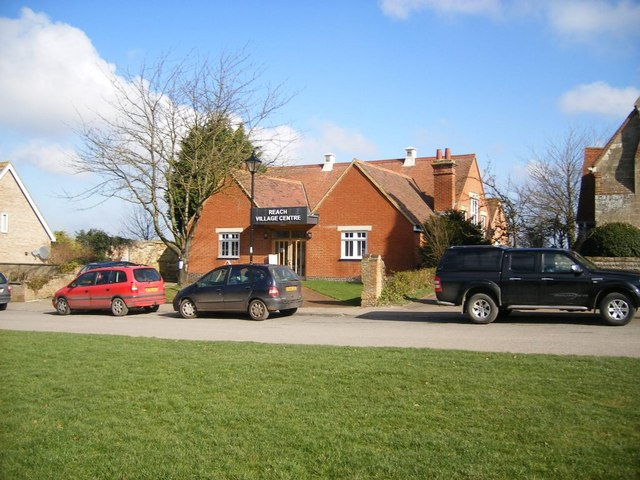

- Location within Cambridgeshire
- Population: 358 (2011)
- OS grid reference: TL570662
- District: East Cambridgeshire
- Shire county: Cambridgeshire
- Region: East
- Country: England
- Sovereign state: United Kingdom
- Post town: CAMBRIDGE
- Postcode district: CB25
- Dialling code: 01638
- UK Parliament: Ely and East Cambridgeshire

Reach is a small village and civil parish on the edge of the fenland in East Cambridgeshire, England at the north end of Devil's Dyke, about 1.5 miles (2.4 km) west of Burwell.

== History ==
Reach was an important economic centre in early Anglo-Saxon and Viking times. Goods were loaded at its common hythe (wharf) for transport into the fen waterway system from at least 1100. Reach was a significant producer of clunch, a chalky stone; a new wood has been planted on the old clunch pits, where chalky cliffs are visible from early quarrying. Reach's use as a port continued until about 200 years ago.

When the Anglo-Saxons built the Devil's Dyke around the 6th century, the northern end of the dyke split the settlement in two (East Reach and West Reach) until part of it was refilled to create the current fair green in the 18th century. East Reach has since vanished, filled in by arable land.

In medieval times, Reach was a hamlet sitting on the border of the parishes of Burwell and Swaffham Prior. It was not until 1961 that it became a separate civil parish. The parish covers an area of 1,044 acres (422 ha). For ecclesiastical purposes it is part of the parish of 'Burwell with Reach'.

Reach Lode, a Roman canal, still exists, and remains navigable. The village church, originally Holy Trinity School Church and latterly called St Etheldreda's, was built in 1860, on the site of the former chapel of St John. The ruined perpendicular arch of the old chapel is visible behind the new church.

On village signs, the name of the village is spelled Reche. The name itself derives from rece (meaning "strip of land").

The Grade II medieval market cross survives as just the white limestone cross base, currently tucked away near the information board out of the way of funfair-goers.

== Reach Fair ==
The village is the scene of the Reach Fair, one of England's oldest festivals. The Fair was originally held annually at Rogationtide (which replaced the pagan festival of May Day), and is now held every May Day Bank Holiday. Officially run by the Cambridge Corporation, and opened annually by the Mayor of Cambridge, it has been an annual event for over 800 years since receiving its charter in 1201 from King John.

Reach Fair was historically a grand regional occasion, hosting feasting and parades over three days. The Fair is held on the central fair green, and probably extended down further to Reach Lode in its earlier days. In 2001, on the 800th anniversary of the fair, a plaque commemorating the charter was unveiled on Hill Farm, one of the fair green's older buildings.

A custom in the fair is for the mayor and other councillors to throw pennies into the crowd for the young people.

Since 1201, the Bank Holiday Monday fair has been cancelled only four times, twice in the 17th century due to the English Civil War and twice due to the COVID-19 pandemic in 2020 and 2021.

== Village life ==
The village is home to "The Dyke's End", a public house which was saved from closure by the villagers, and which was visited by Prince Charles at that time.

Primary school children attend Swaffham Prior primary school whilst secondary pupils usually go to Bottisham Village College.

== Gallery ==
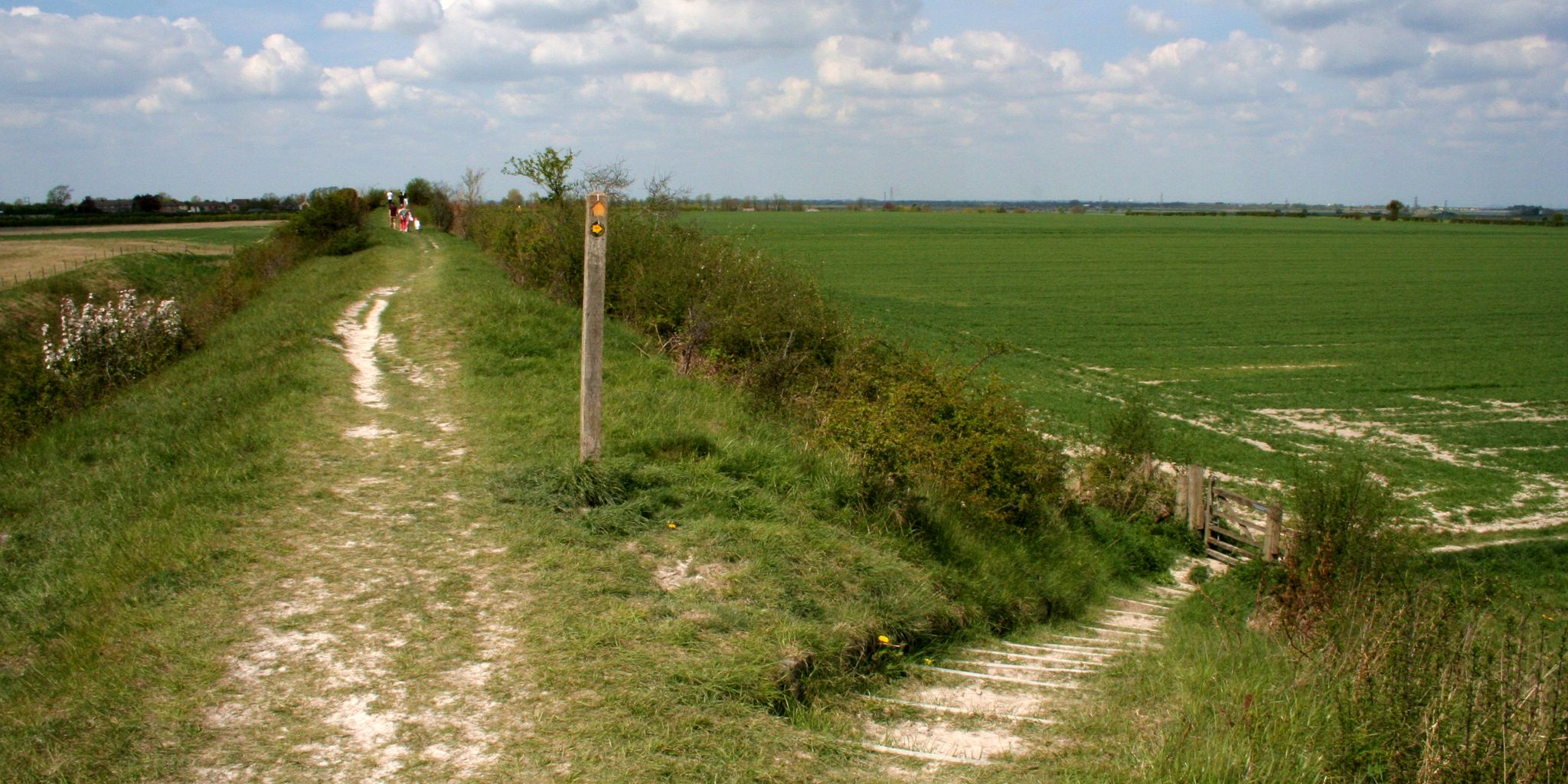
View towards Reach from the Devil's Dyke

remains of the Market Cross

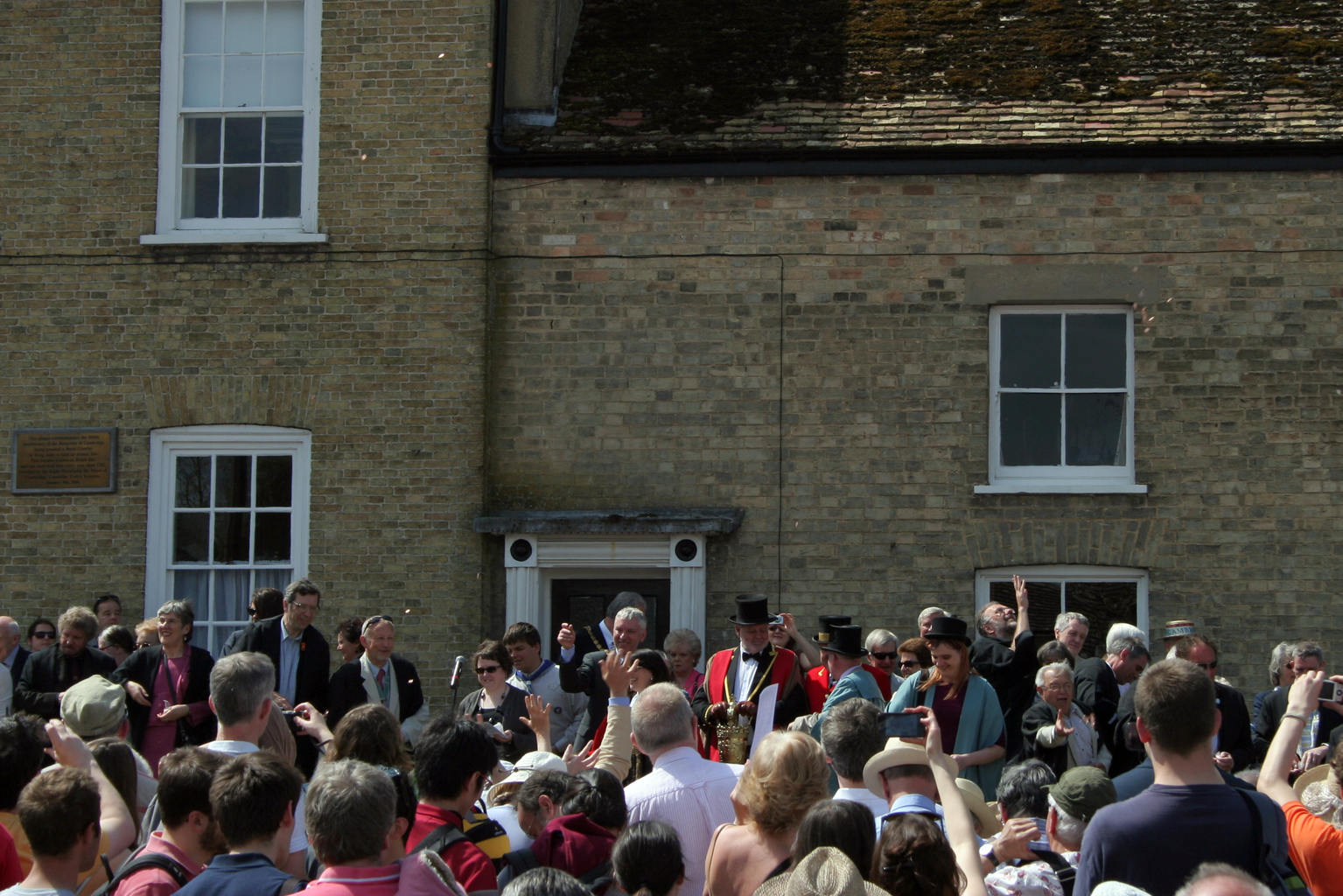
Councillors throwing pennies to the crowd at Reach Fair 2013
