= Burwell Tramway =

Burwell Tramway was a 2.5 miles (4.0 km) standard gauge industrial tramway which ran from the Ely-Newmarket line, just south of the Soham-Wicken A1123 road (52.3111°N 0.3440°E), to industries just north of Burwell Lode (52.2909°N 0.3089°E). As well as serving Fisons chemical (fertilizer) works, the line also served the adjacent Burwell Brick Company brickworks, a cement works, and local fruit growers and farmers.

== History ==
The line was in existence by 1900 and was closed in 1971.

== Fruit Tramway ==
An Ordnance Survey map from the 1920s shows an agricultural tramway feeder, possibly narrow gauge from the cartographic representation, running west across Little Fen parallel to and south of New River through an area of orchards.

== Locomotives ==
- Planet 4-wheel diesel-mechanical locomotive no. FH3887 at work c. 1959, photograph reference IND330, IND579
