= Lidgate =

Village in Suffolk, England

Coordinates: 52°11′N 0°31′E

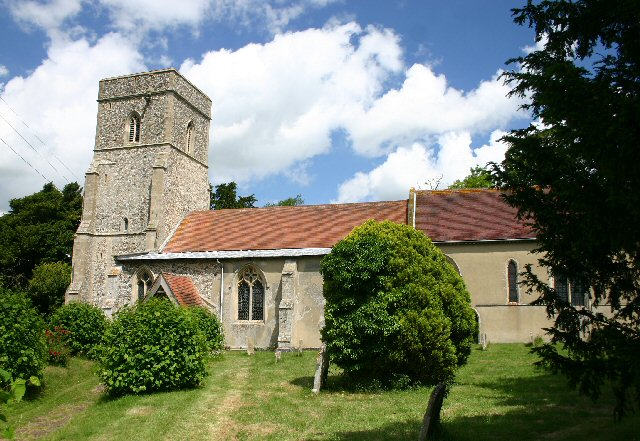
St Mary's church

Lidgate is a small village and a civil parish in the West Suffolk district, in the English county of Suffolk. Lidgate is located on the B1063 road in between the towns of Newmarket and Clare. The population of Lidgate is around 250, measured at 241 in the 2011 Census.

St Mary's church dates from the 13th century and is a Grade II* listed building. The village was the origin of John Lydgate (c. 1370 – c. 1451), monk and poet; he left his signature and a coded message in graffiti on a wall of the church.

The adjacent Lidgate Castle is a medieval motte and bailey castle built to an unusual quadrangular design. It probably dates to The Anarchy during the reign of King Stephen.
