= Reginald Ely =

English Gothic architect (fl.1438–71)

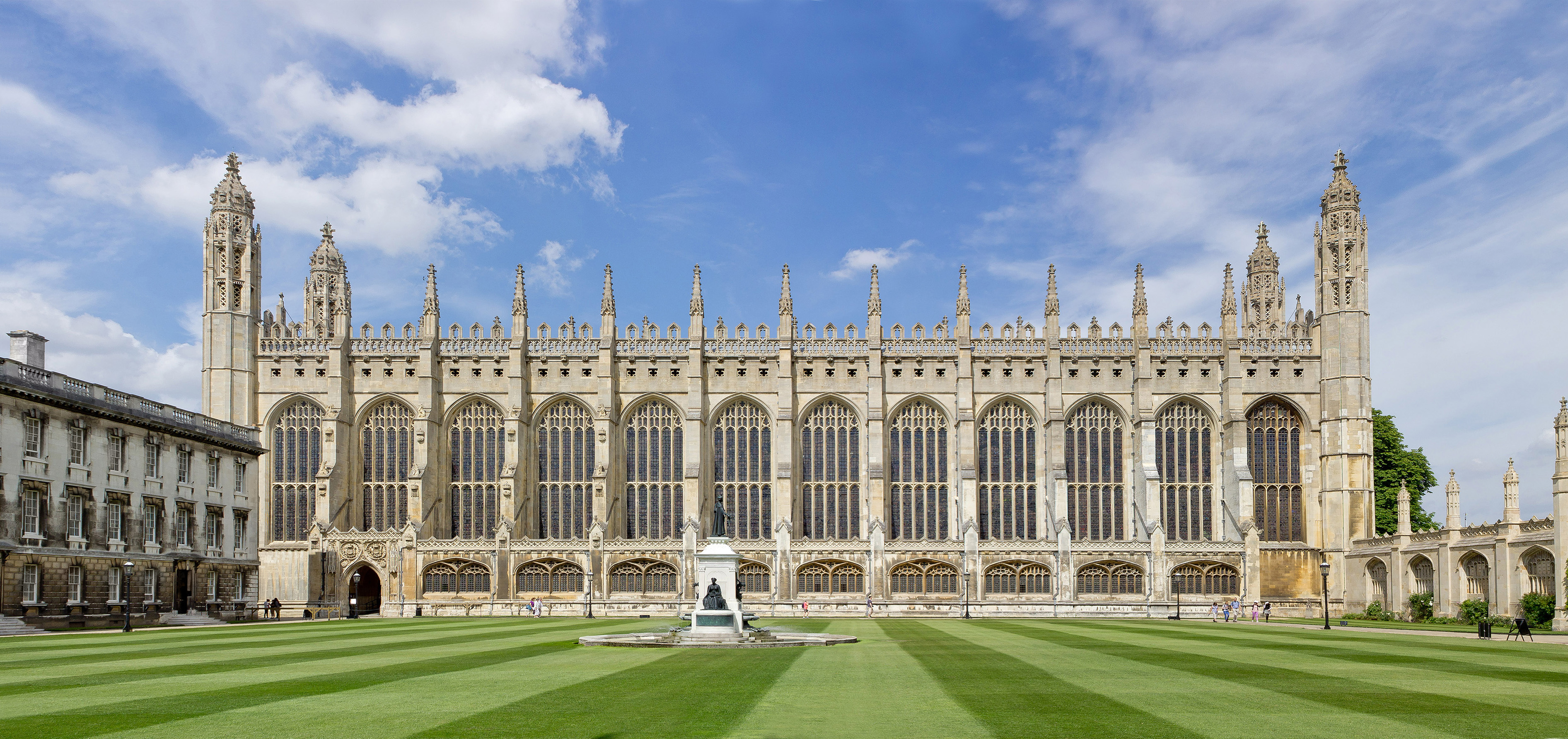
King's College Chapel, Cambridge

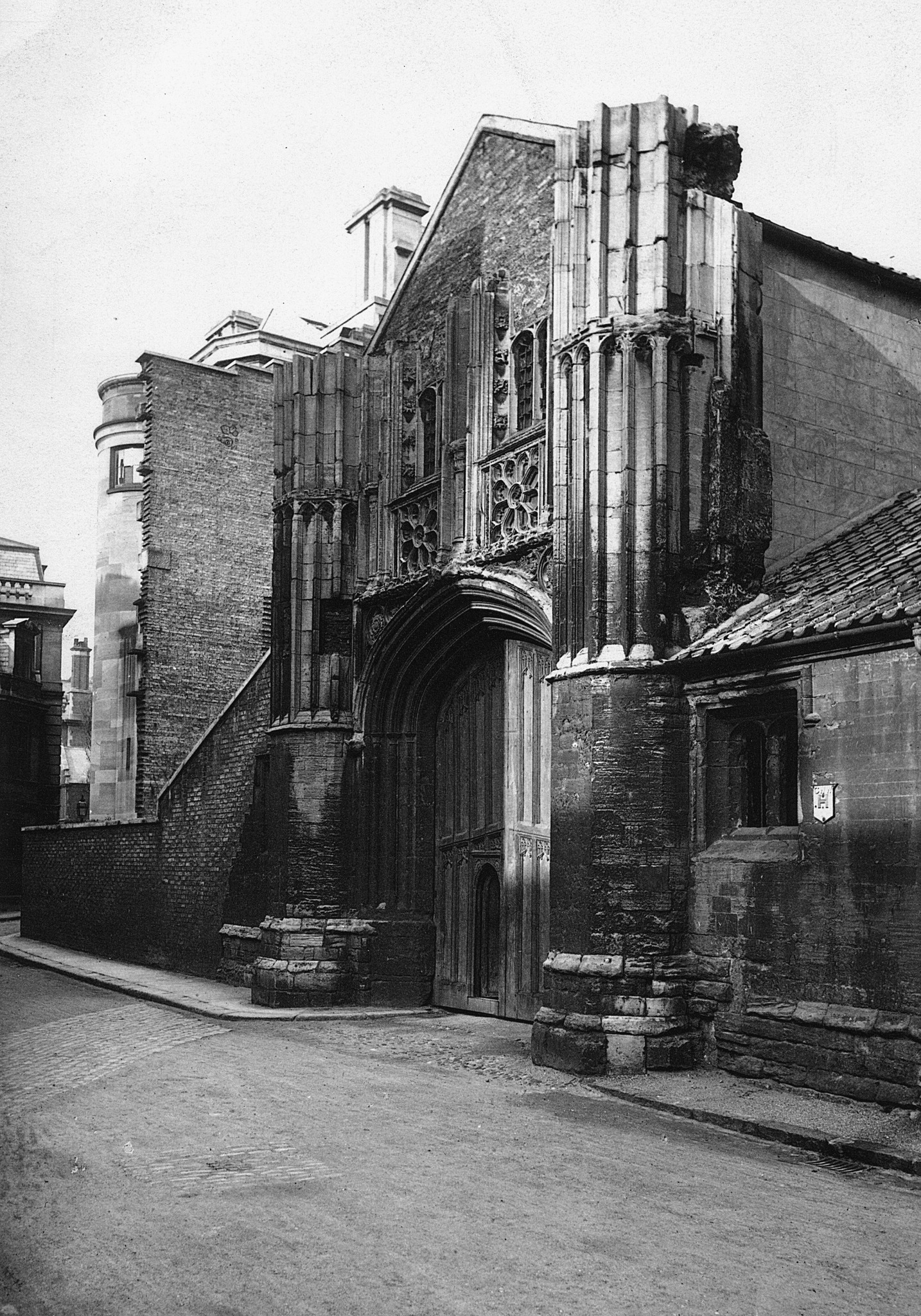
The incomplete gate of the Old Schools, before 19th century reconstruction.

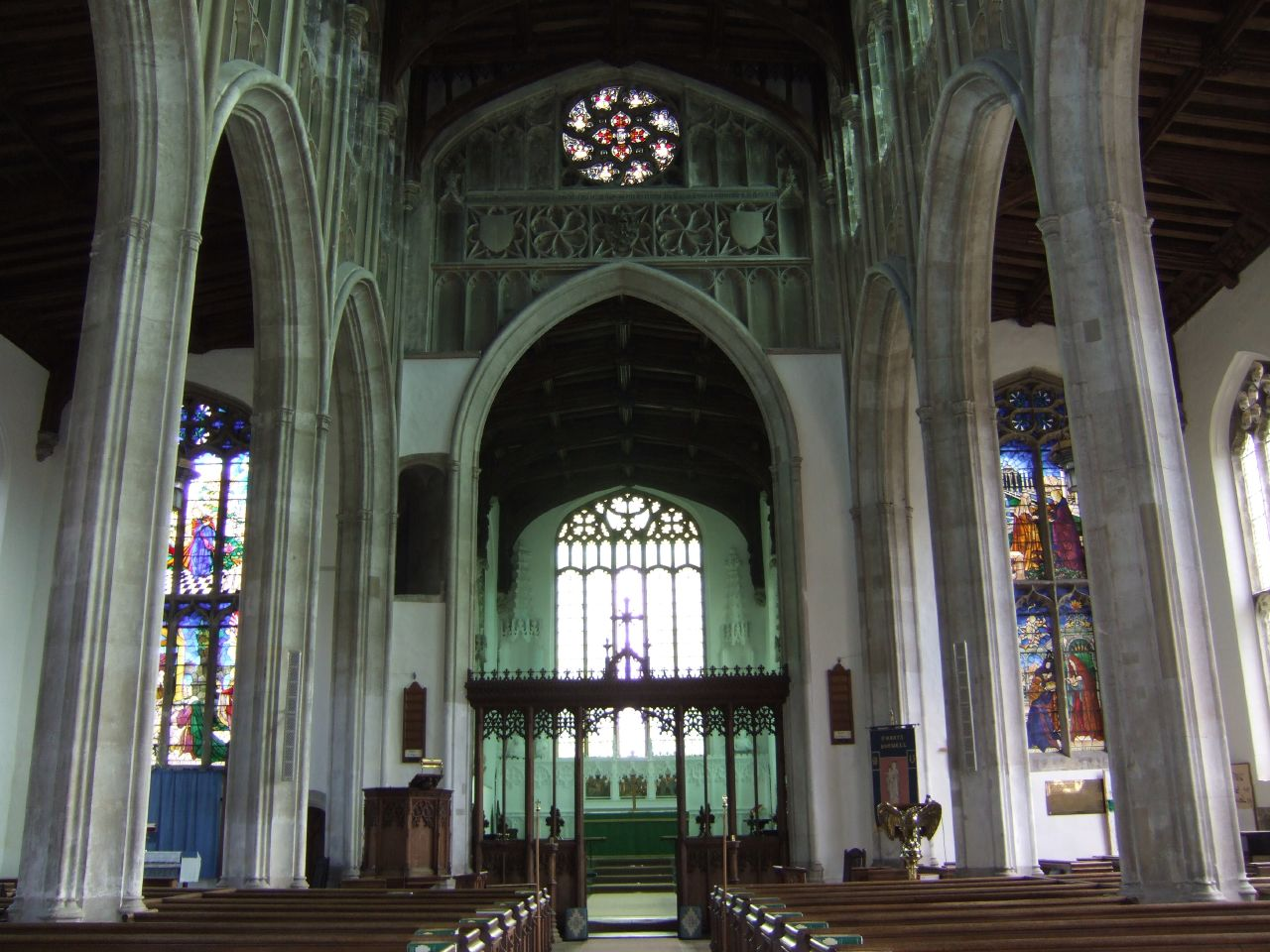
Church of St Mary the Virgin, Burwell, Cambridgeshire

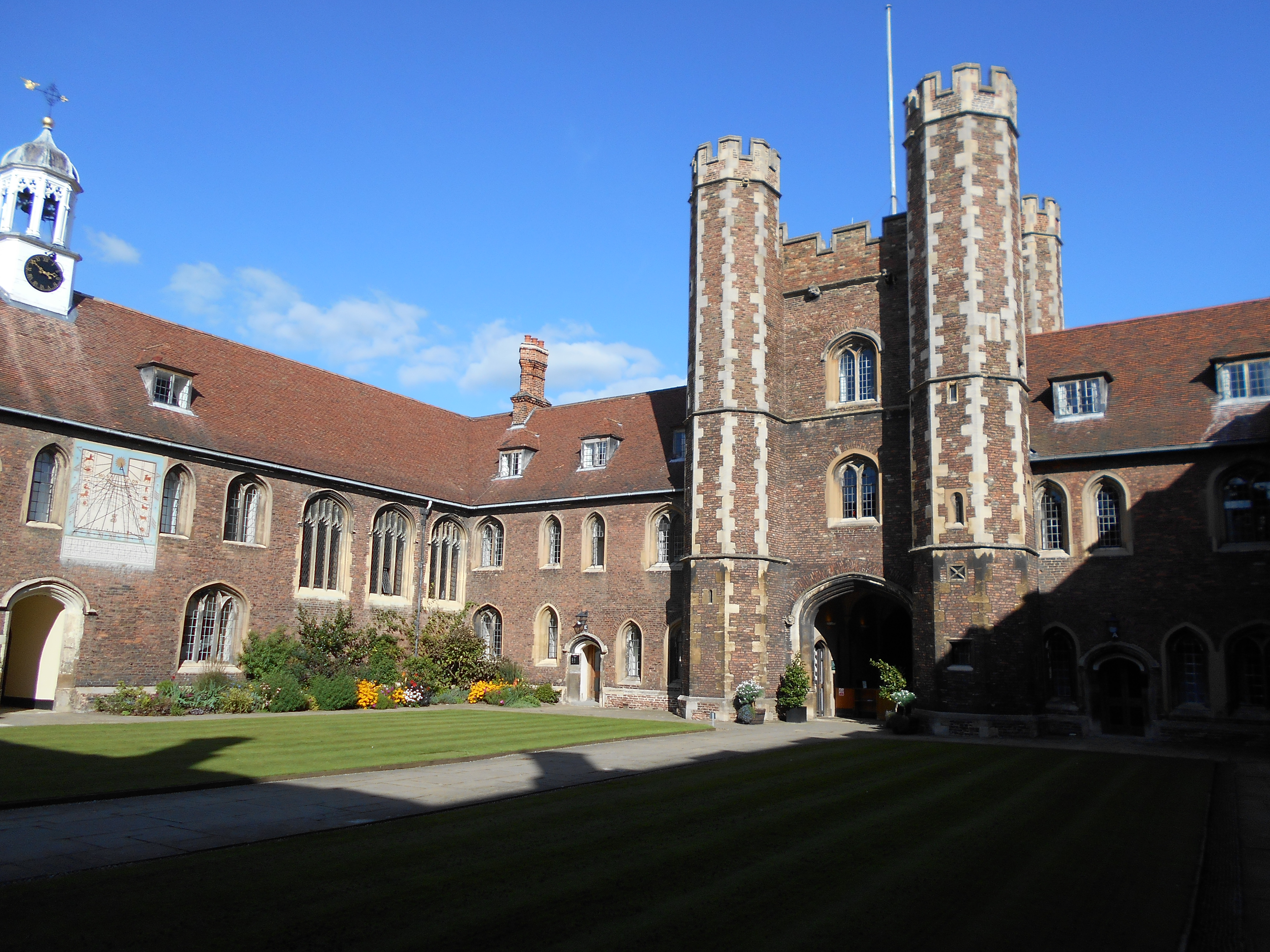
Old Court, Queens' College, Cambridge

Reginald Ely or Reynold of Ely (fl. 1438–1471) was an English master mason working in East Anglia in the 15th century. He has been considered one of the most significant 15th century master masons for his contribution to King's College Chapel, Cambridge - one of the most prominent examples of the Perpendicular style which characterized English Gothic architecture from the 14th century onwards.

== Career ==
Reginald Ely probably came from Coltishall, near Norwich, and may have spent his early career working on projects of the Mancroft workshop in Norwich, such as the Erpingham Gate at Norwich Cathedral, Blackfriars and St Peter Mancroft. He may also have travelled to France during the English occupation of Normandy, which would explain the Flamboyant elements in his buildings. However, his early career is unknown, and he is first attested in 1438 working at Peterhouse in Cambridge; there he was responsible for a staircase to the college library and possibly for part of the kitchen-wing of the great hall. His earliest surviving building is probably the incomplete gatehouse of the Old Schools, begun in 1441, north of King's College chapel. This was originally intended to be the main court of King's College, but was left unfinished when the plans for the college were vastly expanded in 1448. He was almost certainly responsible for St Mary's Church, Burwell, Cambridgeshire (1454–64) and possibly also Queens' College, Cambridge (begun 1446). Other buildings tentatively ascribed to him (though only on the basis of limited stylistic evidence) include St Edward's Church, Cambridge and the earlier parts of the Boston Stump.

His greatest project, and the only one which is conclusively linked to him by documentary evidence, is the chapel of King's College, part of the University of Cambridge, begun in 1446. Two years earlier Reginald was charged with sourcing craftsmen for the chapel's construction. Though the pace of construction drastically reduced with the fall of Henry VI, the college's patron, in 1461, Ely seems to have continued working on the building until his death in 1471. On stylistic evidence, Francis Woodman suggests that his contribution to the chapel consisted of the overall layout, the walls of the choir up to transom height including the carved corbels to support the vault, the two eastern side-chapels on the north side, and the vault support in line with the screen on the south side.

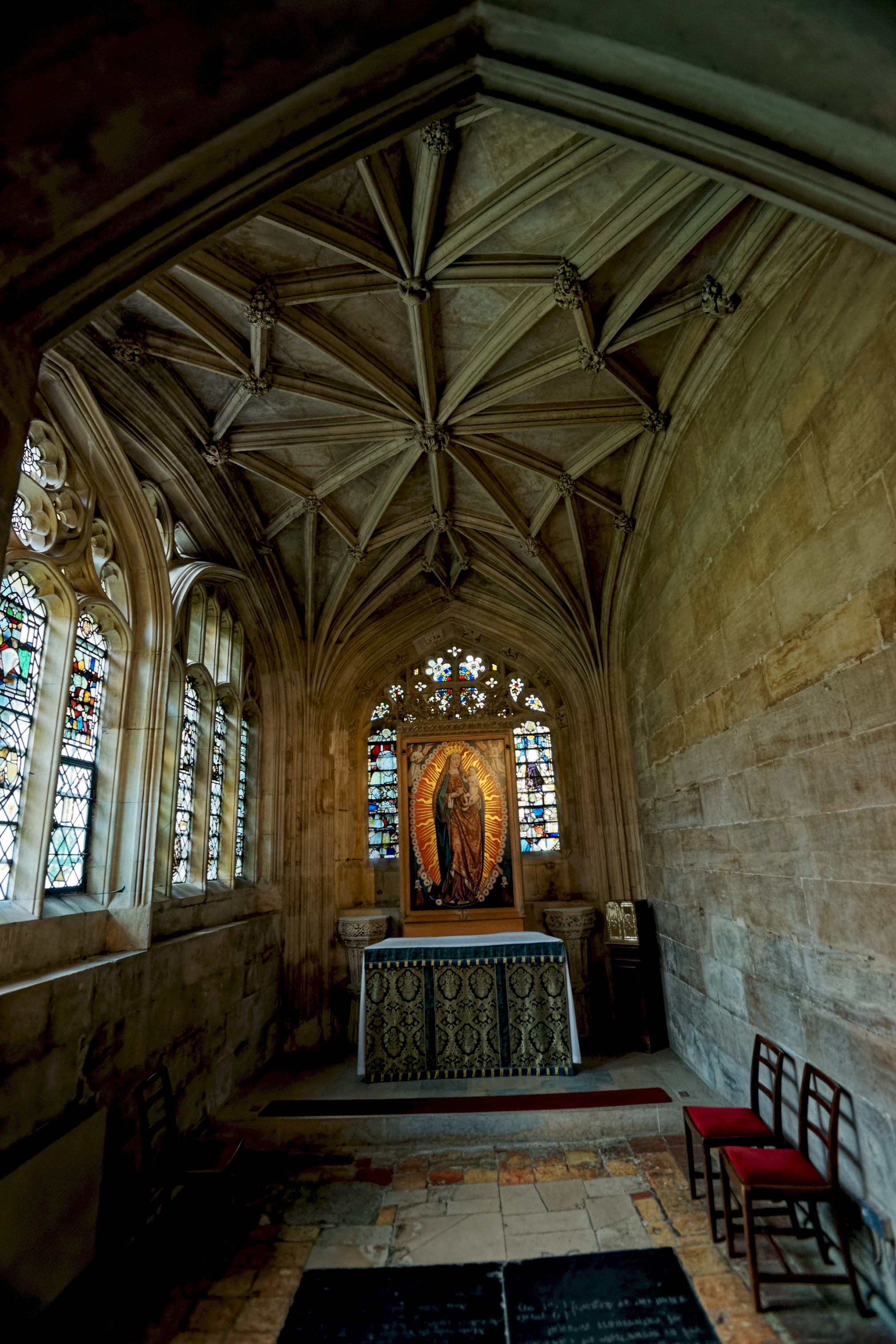
The north-east side chapel at King's College. The window on the left has asymmetrical tracery, and the lierne vault is limited to Ely's work.

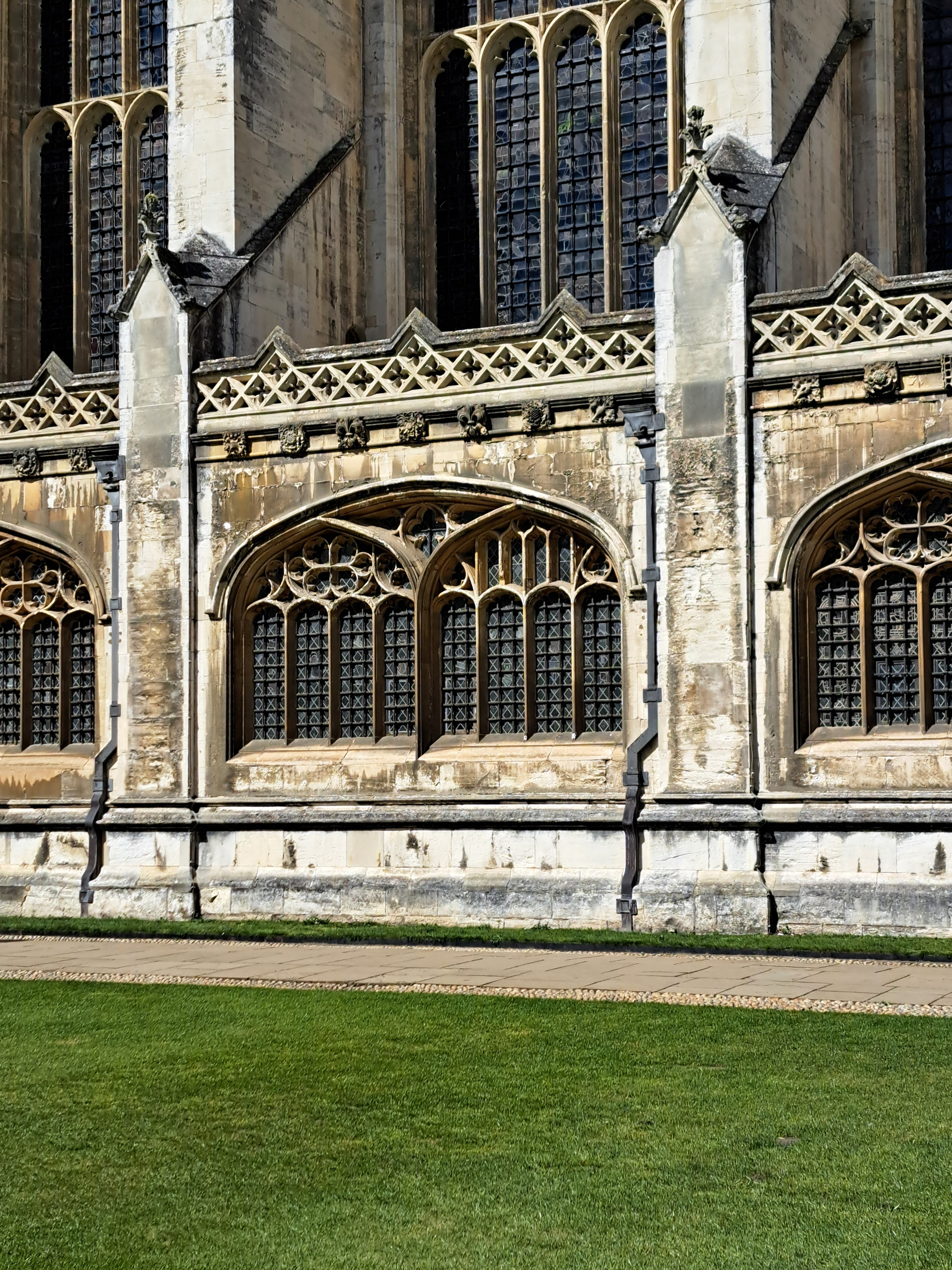
Asymmetrical tracery on the south side of King's College Chapel.

== Style ==
Ely's style combined the stately austerity of orthodox English Perpendicular with more fantastical elements derived from the French Flamboyant. This can especially be seen in his tracery, some of which rejects the repetitive panels of the Perpendicular for four-petalled flower patterns (later popular across East Anglia) and swirling mouchette wheels (radiating teardrop patterns), seen at French churches like St Ouen in Rouen. The side chapels at King's also have unique asymmetrical tracery, with one half of the window having Perpendicular panels, while the other half has a four-petalled flower. Another feature of French origin is the use of 'peeping' bases at King's, where the base moulding of the underlying structure penetrates through applied buttresses.

=== King's College Chapel ===
As the design was changed substantially after Ely's death, it is difficult to determine what Ely's intentions were for King's College Chapel. The building was certainly intended to be vaulted, as specified in the Founder's instructions, but it would have been a lierne vault, like those Ely executed in the side chapels, rather than the fan vault that now covers the building. It is also possible that there was to be a second tier of windows, in the space where John Wastell later inserted blind panelling between the heads of the main windows and the vault. This would have made the chapel appear more like that of St Stephen in Westminster Palace, one of the most influential buildings in medieval England.

=== Queens' College ===
As Queens' is built of brick, while King's is of stone, it naturally differs in execution. While some details, particularly in the gatehouse, are similar to Ely's work at King's, other features like the window tracery and base mouldings are unlike any of Ely's work. Therefore, it is unclear whether the building was by Ely. Its frontage to Queens' lane, with square embattled turrets, does give some sense of how Front Court at King's may have appeared if completed to the original design.
