= Lidgate Castle =

Castle in Sufolk, England

- Lidgate, Suffolk, England
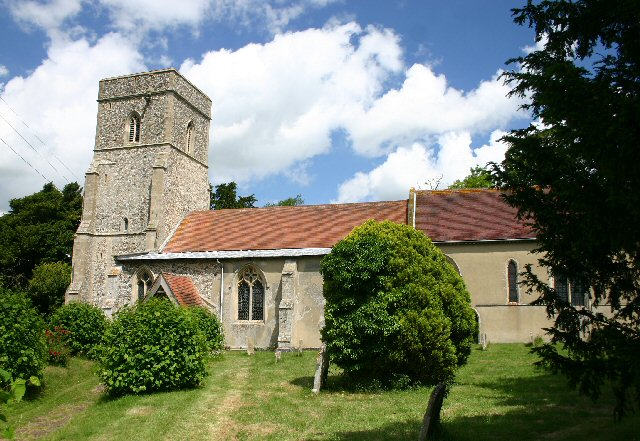
- Lidgate Church, located against part of the castle bailey and incorporating the castle chapel

Site information
- Type: Motte and bailey
- Condition: Earthworks remain

Location
- Shown within Suffolk
- Coordinates: 52.1943°N 0.5165°E
- Grid reference: grid reference TL721581

Lidgate Castle is a medieval motte and bailey castle in the village of Lidgate, Suffolk, England, built to an unusual quadrangular design.

== Details ==
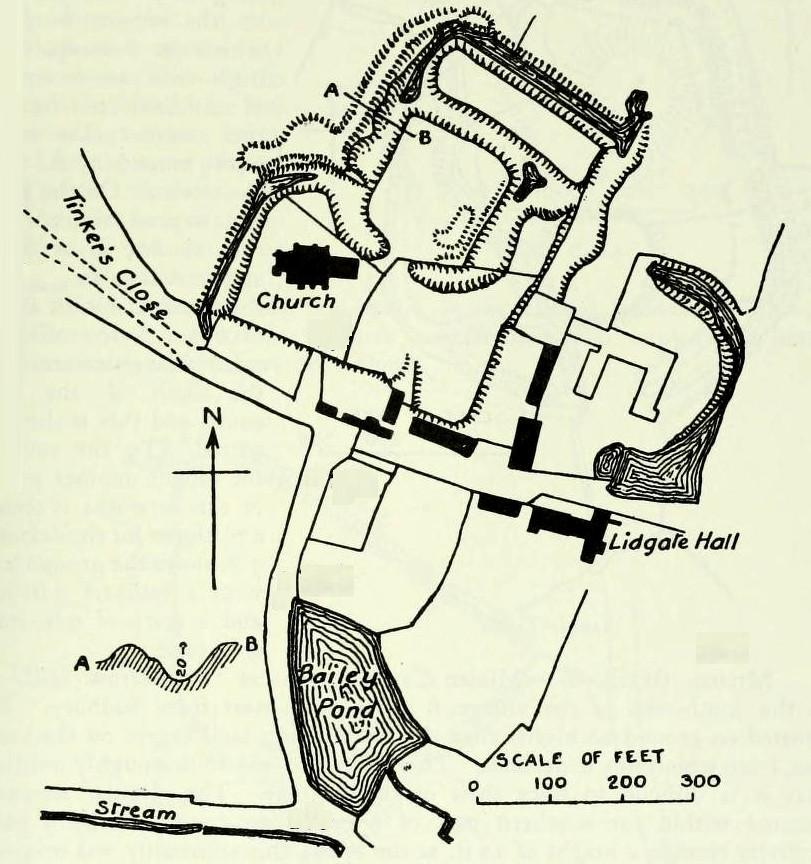
Plan of Lidgate Castle in 1911

Lidgate Castle was built in the village of Lidgate, Suffolk, probably around 1143, during the years of the civil war known as the Anarchy. At this time King Stephen of England was engaged in a campaign against the rebel baron Geoffrey de Mandeville, and the castle may have been built as part of the campaign to contain his advances in the region.

The castle was built on a natural rise, and takes the form of an unusual, quadrangular motte and bailey design. The motte is square, 20 m across and is today around 2 m high, with two adjacent protective platforms alongside it; the main bailey to the south is protected by a protective ditch, 20 m wide and 5 m deep, and a 3.2 m high outer bank.

The castle was probably abandoned in the 1260s, and at some point in the 13th or 14th century, St Mary's Church was built inside the bailey, against the earthworks. The church's nave was probably the original castle chapel – the south side of the castle was largely destroyed to make way for the growth of the village and agriculture. Today the castle is a scheduled monument.

== See also ==
- Castles in Great Britain and Ireland
- List of castles in England

== Bibliography ==
- Bailey, Mark. (2010) Medieval Suffolk: An Economic and Social History, 1200-1500. Woodbridge, UK: Boydell Press. ISBN 978-1-84383-529-5.
- Page, William. (ed) (1911) The Victoria History of Suffolk, Vol. 1. London: University of London.
- Pettifer, Adrian. (2002) English Castles: a Guide by Counties. Woodbridge, UK: Boydell Press. ISBN 978-0-85115-782-5.
- Wall, J. C. (1911) "Ancient Earthworks," in Page (ed) (1911).
