= William Wickins =

William John Wickins, KHC (1862–1933) was Archdeacon of Calcutta from 1911 until 1913.

Wickins was educated at Emmanuel College, Cambridge and ordained in 1885. After curacies in Burwell and Ely he served with the Indian Ecclesiastical Establishment at Dum Dum, Barrackpore, Howrah, Kasauli, Fort William and Darjeeling. In 1912 he was appointed an Honorary Chaplain to the King. On his return from India he was Vicar of Abbotsley (1913–16) then St. Giles with St. Peter, Cambridge. He died on 28 January 1933.
