= Rampton, Cambridgeshire =

Village in Cambridgeshire, England

Coordinates: 52.292°N 0.090°E

Rampton
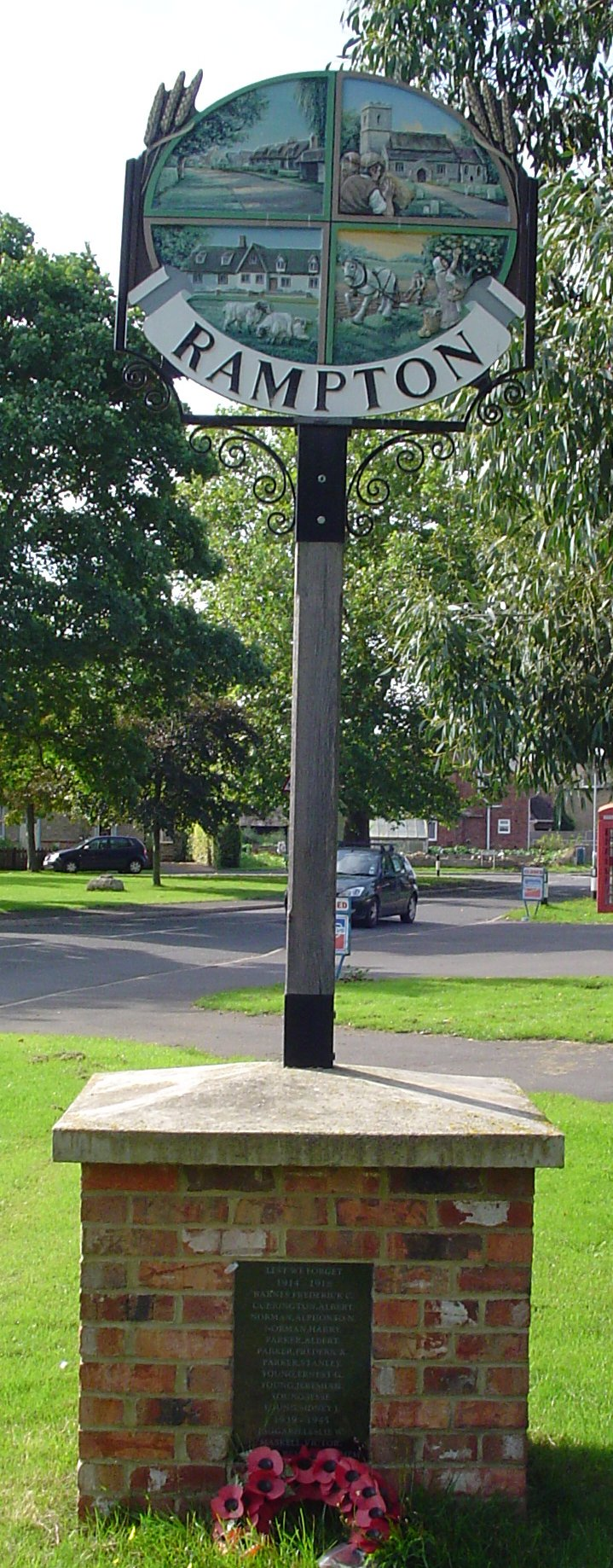

- Location within Cambridgeshire
- Population: 440 (2001); 448 (2011)
- OS grid reference: TL426680
- Shire county: Cambridgeshire
- Region: East
- Country: England
- Sovereign state: United Kingdom
- Post town: CAMBRIDGE
- Postcode district: CB24
- Dialling code: 01954

Rampton is a village in Cambridgeshire, England, situated on the edge of The Fens six miles to the north of Cambridge.

== History ==
The edge of the Fens were well-populated during Roman times and Rampton was no exception. The settlement apparently vanished after the Roman era and reappeared around the area of the present church in Anglo Saxon times. The earthwork remains of a castle, known as Giant's Hill, are located to the east of the village by the church. Construction of the castle began during The Anarchy circa 1140, but was likely never completed.

Rampton has always been one of the smallest of the area's villages along the edge of the Fens. The Domesday Book listed 19 tenants, and there were only 31 families in 1563 and 39 households in 1664. At the time of the first census in 1801 there were 162 inhabitants, rising to 220 in 1821 and 250 in 1871 but dropping to under 180 in 1901. After slow growth to 221 by 1951, its growth mirrored that of neighbouring villages in rising to 355 in 1981 and 440 in 2001.

The origin of the name is unclear but may well simply come from "ram tun" or "village of the ram".

== Church ==
The parish Church of All Saints is noted as one of a very few English churches with a thatched roof and one of only two in Cambridgeshire (together with St Michael's Church, Longstanton). It consists of a chancel, nave with south aisle and porch and north vestry, and west tower. The present building apparently incorporates parts of a previous 12th-century building, but the majority of the stonework dates from the 13th and 14th centuries.

The nave includes a 13th-century marble grave commemorating Nicholas of Huntingdon, and there is an effigy of a knight in the chancel dating from the late 13th-century. There is a sundial on the tower.

A third bell was added to the two medieval bells in 1713. Three further bells were added in the 20th century making one of the lightest rings in the Diocese of Ely.

== Village life ==
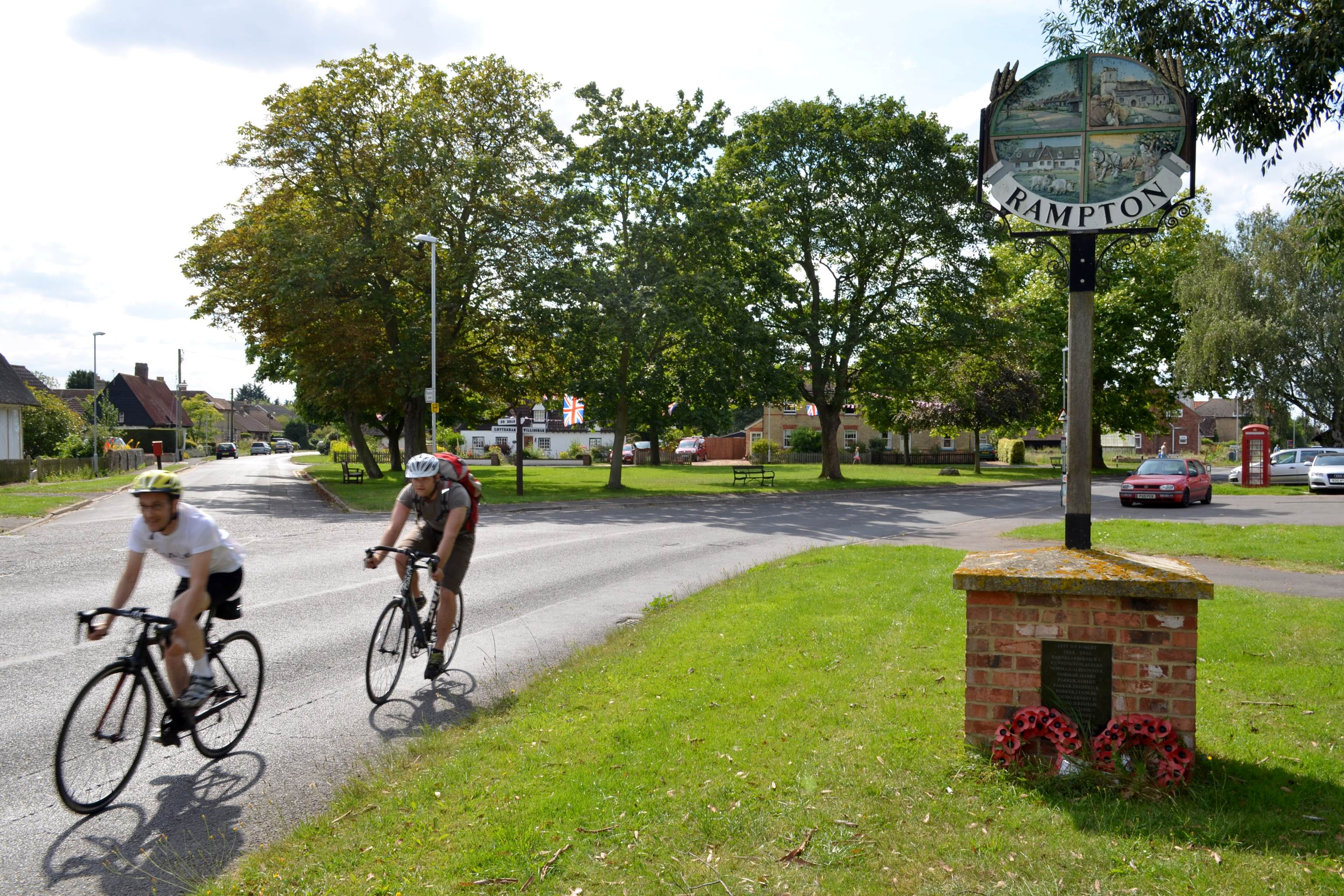
Rampton village sign and green in July 2014

The village is home to an annual horse show (first Saturday in September), which is celebrated locally as an authentic traditional style show, with gymkhana. Other village events include an annual Fayre on the village green in the summer, village revue/pantomime with dinner provided free by the Rampton '77 Committee for all villagers over the age of sixty.

For centuries an annual Rampton Feast was held on the Sunday before 15 July, moving to the Sunday after Trinity by the start of the 20th century, but dying away until revived in 1977.

Rampton has one public house, The Black Horse, that opened around 1850. Former pubs include The Chequers that was open by 1765 and closed in 1917, and The Fox and Hounds by the Willingham road close to the parish boundary that was open for little more than a decade from around 1880.
