= Clunch =

Traditional building material of chalky limestone rock

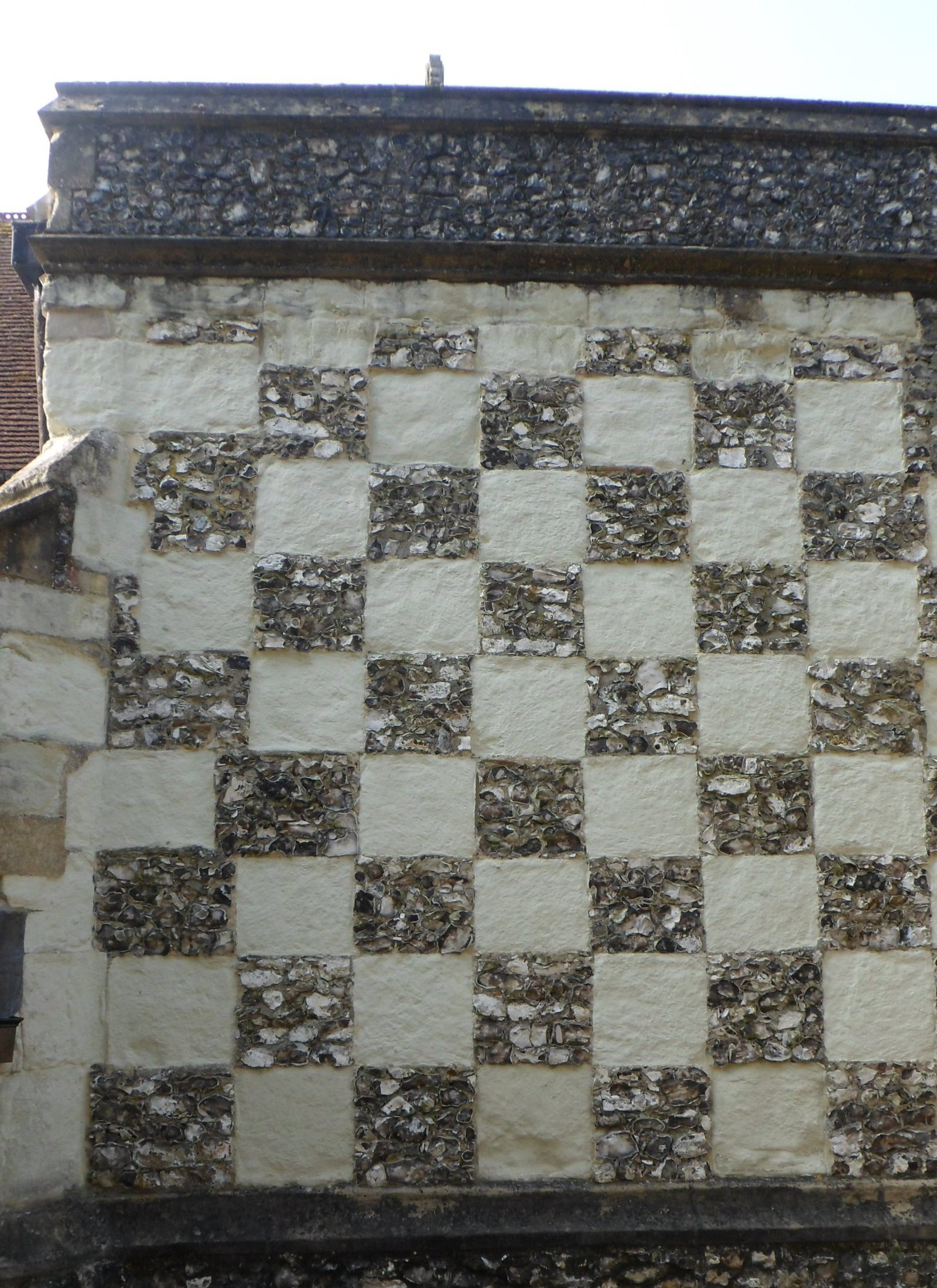
Flint and the pale stone, clunch used together in a checkerboard pattern on the wall of the side chapel at St Michael's Church, Mickleham, Surrey.

Clunch is a traditional building material of chalky limestone rock used mainly in eastern England and Normandy. Clunch distinguishes itself from archetypal forms of limestone by being softer in character when cut, and may resemble chalk in lower density, or with minor clay-like components.

== Use ==
Clunch has been used in a wide variety of shapes such as irregular lumps picked from the topsoil of certain fields, or more commonly blocks quarried by being cut from the bedrock in regular-shaped (ashlar) building blocks. If in the first form it can be bedded in a ramshackle manner (as rubble masonry); if in the second then laid in courses. In either case, mortar is often used between stones to form walls.

== Properties ==
The stone is a chalk from the Lower Chalk of the Cretaceous age, the period of geological time approximately 145–66 million years ago. It is greyish-white to light beige in colour, often with a greenish tinge. The latter is caused by the presence of glauconite, the potassium and iron aluminium silicate mineral that is also found in Kentish Ragstone. The stone has a gritty texture because of the frequent presence of shell fossils. This stone has been quarried at Totternhoe Quarry in Dunstable, Bedfordshire, by H. G. Clarke & Son since 1920.

It is particularly soft when quarried and subject to chemical and wind erosion as exposed material, i.e. when unrendered in paint, stucco or cement. It can be cut by a saw when in its softer state; when it has been quarried out of the ground it still contains a large amount of water. When the stone dries out it becomes harder, and is not as easy to cut.

Clunch is generically a soft limestone. It can be rich in iron-bearing clays or be very fine and white – in effect just chalk. It is used in various parts of East Anglia, where more durable stone is uncommon, and can be seen frequently in and around Thetford – mostly now for property boundary walls as it is not a long-lasting material, but it is also used for some building walls, especially in traditional agricultural buildings.

In Ely Cathedral it can be seen in some interior locations. The nearby village of Burwell has its civil parish magazine named after the building material. It is found in the village of Seale in Surrey and in Farnham.

== Inferior meaning ==
The term has been sometimes used more generically, in other parts of England for any soft and aggregate-based vernacular building stone that has been used as a cheaper, inferior substitute for stronger stone.

== See also ==
- Bath stone – Oolitic limestone from Somerset used as a building material
- Caen stone – Limestone quarried near Caen, France
- Bargate stone – Highly durable form of sandstone used for building
- Portland stone – Limestone quarried on the Isle of Portland, Dorset, England
- Limestone – Type of sedimentary rock
