= Barnwell, Cambridgeshire =

Suburb of Cambridge, England

Coordinates: 52.207°N 0.164°E

Barnwell
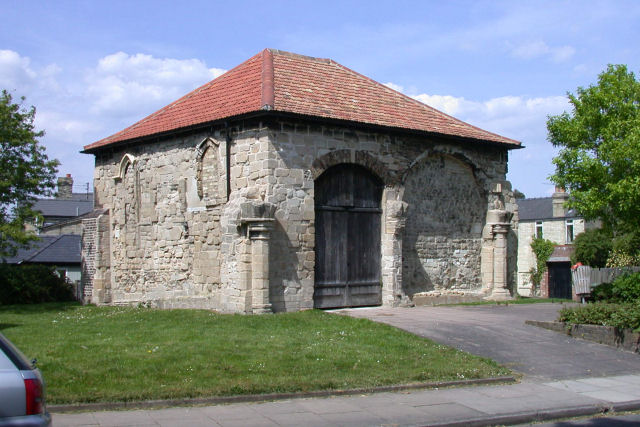
- The Cellarer's Chequer, Barnwell Priory.

- Location within Cambridgeshire
- Population: 1,967 (Ward. 2011)
- OS grid reference: TL479584
- District: Cambridge
- Shire county: Cambridgeshire
- Region: East
- Country: England
- Sovereign state: United Kingdom
- Post town: CAMBRIDGE
- Postcode district: CB5
- Dialling code: 01223
- Police: Cambridgeshire
- Fire: Cambridgeshire
- Ambulance: East of England
- UK Parliament: Cambridge

Barnwell is a suburb of Cambridge in England. The population of the Barnwell ward of Cambridge City Council at the 2011 census was 1,967. It lies northeast of the city, with Cambridge Airport located immediately to the east. It forms part of the ecclesiastical parish of St Andrew the Less and was the site of Barnwell Priory.

Barnwell is also home to the Leper Chapel near the Newmarket Road bridge over the railway at Barnwell Junction. Built in 1125 the chapel is one of the oldest buildings in Cambridge.

== History ==
The history of Barnwell effectively began with the creation of the house of Canons Regular in 1092 by Picot, Lord of Bourn and Madingley and sheriff of Cambridgeshire at the time of the Domesday Book. The house was originally near Cambridge Castle but moved to Barnwell in around 1119 and became Barnwell Priory.

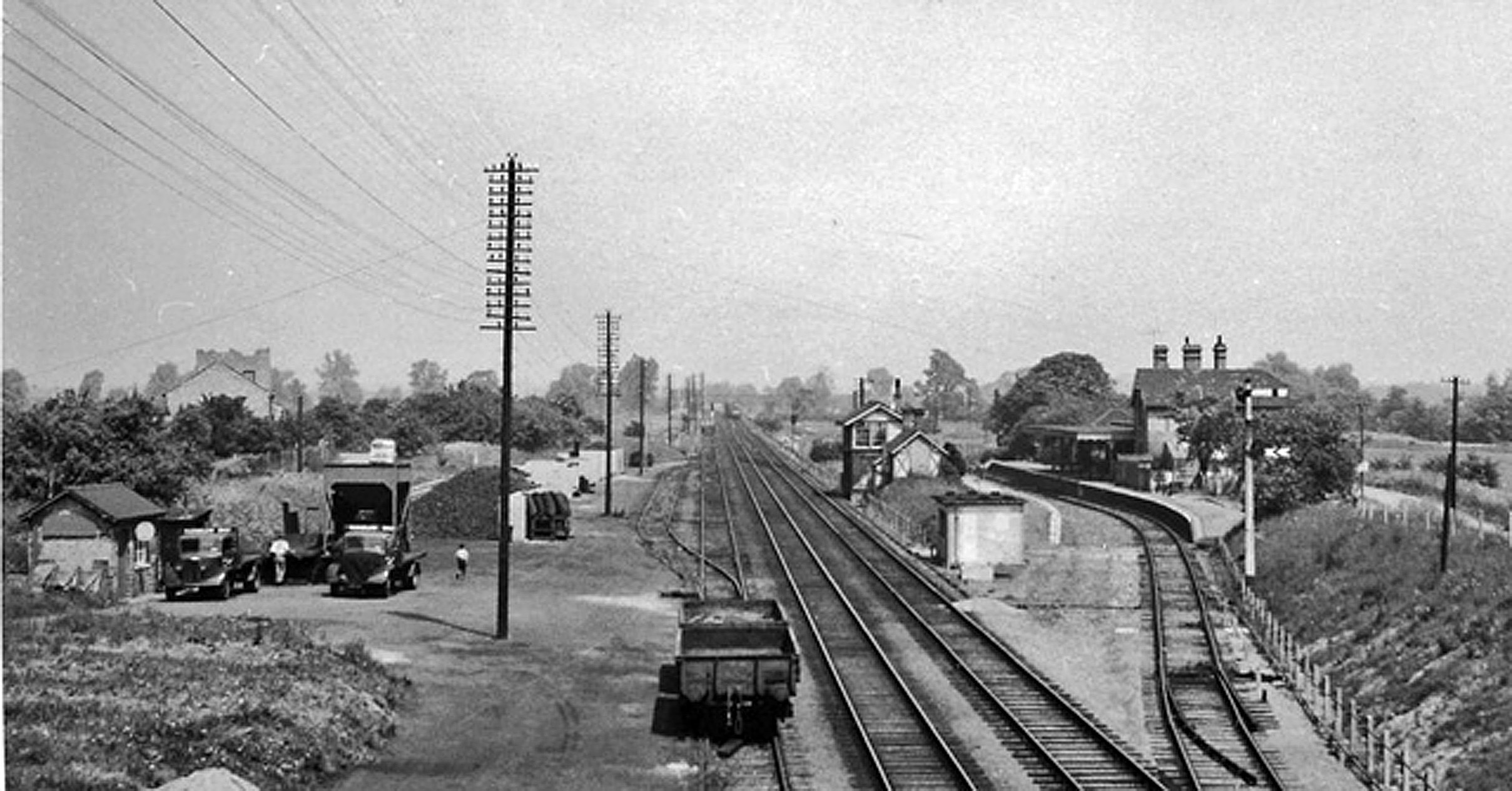
The former railway station of Barnwell Junction in 1963

By the 14th century the city of Cambridge was divided into seven wards, of which the smallest was Barnwell Ward, believed to cover the few houses along the Newmarket Road that fell outside the city's Barnwell Gate. In 1835 the city comprised five wards: East Barnwell, West Barnwell, Market, Trinity, and St. Andrew's, demonstrating the development in the area. Of the city's current fourteen wards, the Barnwell area is covered by the Abbey Ward, which itself takes its name from Barnwell Priory.

By the mid-19th century, Barnwell was a rough area inhabited predominantly by railway workers and manual labourers such as those mining fossil beds. The American author Charles Astor Bristed, writing about his experiences as a student at Cambridge in the 1840s, described Barnwell as synonymous with prostitution. Ion Keith-Falconer opened a mission in Barnwell in 1875 in an attempt to reduce poverty in the area, and in 1878 bought the failing Theatre Royal on Newmarket Road to serve as a permanent mission hall. The astronomer William Scott also worked in the slums in the 1850s as a curate.

Barnwell Junction railway station opened in 1884 as the first station on the Cambridge to Mildenhall railway. It closed in 1962 but the station building including an old passenger car and about a hundred yards of track (disconnected) still exist and are privately owned.

The name "Barnwell" is believed to derive from Bairn Well – and refers to a well where children would gather for amusements at the midsummer festival. This etymology was recorded in the 17th century by William Dugdale in the Monasticon.

An alternative etymology posits that the name derives from Beornewelle, the name Barnwell means "well of Beorna", where Beorna is a name meaning "warrior". This etymology is however largely speculative – since no references to a "well of beorna" exist in the historic record for the area.

== Barnwell today ==
Barnwell has long since ceased to exist as a separate entity, having been absorbed into the city of Cambridge. Now part of Abbey Ward, there is no official geographical entity bearing the name and it no longer appears on Ordnance Survey maps of Cambridge.

The name lives on as the name of streets (Barnwell Road, Barnwell Drive), geographical features (Barnwell Lake), public services (East Barnwell Health Centre, East Barnwell Community Centre, Barnwell Baptist Church) and organisations (Barnwell Business Park, Barnwell Florists). Also the former station building still bears the sign "Barnwell Junction".

== Notable residents ==
- The cricketer Jack Hobbs (1882–1963) was born in Barnwell.

== See also ==
- Abbey House, Cambridge
- Barnwell Priory
- Barnwell chronicler
- Leper Chapel, Cambridge
- Theatre Royal, Barnwell, Cambridge
- University Ground, Barnwell
