= Picot of Cambridge =

11th-century Norman nobleman and sheriff in England

Picot of Cambridge (c. 1022–after 1090) was a Norman landowner and Sheriff of Cambridgeshire.

Born in Saye, Normandy, Picot rose from obscurity to become Sheriff of Cambridgeshire as early as 1071 until at least 1090. He treated Cambridge (then known as Cantebrigge or Grentebrige) as his own, knocking down 27 houses to build Cambridge Castle (probably initially of wood), confiscating land, building mills, seizing goods and raising taxes. The Abbot of Ely described him as "A hungry lion, a ravening wolf, a cunning fox, a dirty pig and an impudent dog".

Picot married Hugolina de Gernon. When she thought she was dying, she made a vow to build a foundation to St Giles, which Picot subsequently honoured, building St Giles' Church near his castle in Cambridge. After Picot's death, the canons were moved to nearby Barnwell to found Barnwell Priory.

Picot's son and heir Robert became implicated in a conspiracy against King Henry I, and fled the country. His estates were forfeit and given to Pain (or Paganus) Peveril who had been the standard bearer to Robert Curthose in the Holy Land.
