= Abbey House =

Abbey House may refer to several houses in England:

- Abbey House, Baker Street, London, a possible location of 221B Baker Street, the fictional residence of Sherlock Holmes
- Abbey House, Barrow-in-Furness, a 1914 house by Edwin Lutyens
- Abbey House, Cambridge, a 17th-century house
- Abbey House, Cirencester, Gloucestershire, a former country house
- Abbey House, Malton, North Yorkshire, a 17th-century house
- Abbey House, Ranton, Staffordshire, a ruined 1820 house
- Abbey House, Whitby, North Yorkshire, a 16th-century house
- Abbey House, Malmesbury, Wiltshire, surrounded by Abbey House Gardens
- Abbey House Museum, Kirkstall, West Yorkshire
