= Walter of Coventry =

English monk and chronicler

Walter of Coventry (fl. 1290), English monk and chronicler, who was apparently connected with a religious house in the province of York, is known to us only through the historical compilation which bears his name, the Memoriale fratris Walteri de Coventria.

The word Memoriale is usually taken to mean "commonplace book." Some critics interpret it in the sense of "a souvenir," and argue that Walter was not the author but merely the donor of the book; but the weight of authority is against this view. The author of the Memoriale lived in the reign of Edward I, and mentions the homage done to Edward as overlord of Scotland (1291).

Since the main narrative extends only to 1225, the Memoriale is emphatically a second-hand production. But for the years 1201-1225 it is a faithful transcript of a contemporary chronicle, the work of a Barnwell canon. A complete text of the Barnwell chronicle is preserved in the College of Arms' (Heralds' College, manuscript 10) but has never yet been printed, though it was collated by Bishop Stubbs for his edition of the Memoriale. The Barnwell annalist, living in Cambridgeshire, was well situated to observe the events of the barons' war, and is our most valuable authority for that important crisis.

He is less hostile to King John than are Ralph of Coggeshall, Roger of Wendover and Matthew Paris. He praises the king's management of the Welsh and Scottish wars; he is critical in his attitude towards the pope and the English opposition; he regards the submission of John to Rome as a skilful stroke of policy, although he notes the fact that some men called it a humiliation. The constitutional agitation of 1215 does not arouse his enthusiasm; he passes curtly over the Runnymede conference, barely mentions Magna Carta, and blames the barons for the resumption of war. It may be from timidity that the annalist avoids attacking John, but it is more probable that the middle classes, whom he represents, regarded the designs of the feudal baronage with suspicion.
