= Theatre Royal, Barnwell, Cambridge =

Former theatre in Cambridge, England

Coordinates: 52.2079°N 0.1345°E

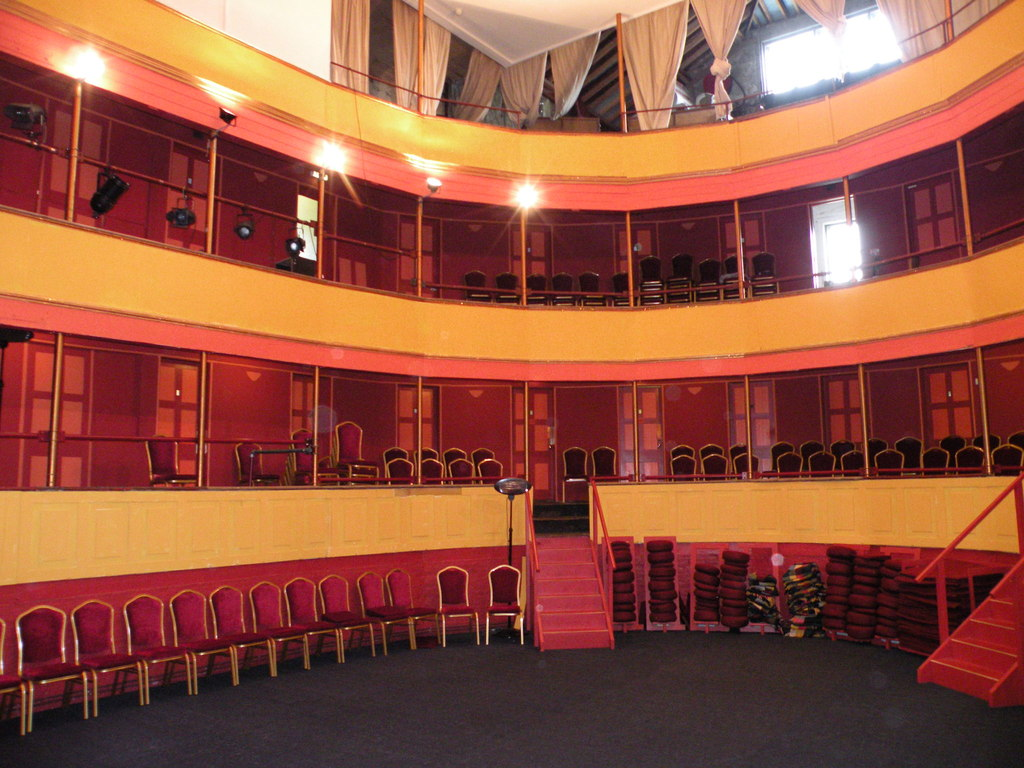
Interior of the former theatre in 2011

The Theatre Royal was built in the Barnwell suburb of Cambridge, England, in 1816. It closed later that century but reopened as the Cambridge Festival Theatre from 1926 until 1935. The building, in which part of the interior of the theatre survives, is Grade II* listed.

== 19th century ==
In the mid-18th century, Cambridge's main source of theatrical performances came from travelling companies, including the Norwich Company of Comedians, that would perform on Stourbridge Common at the Stourbridge Fair for three weeks each autumn. As a result, three theatres were built in Barnwell in succession, but Cambridge lacked a permanent theatre.

William Wilkins (1751–1815), a building contractor, was proprietor of a chain of theatres in East Anglia known as the Norwich Theatre Circuit. Wilkins and his son, also William (1778–1839), built a theatre in 1807 at Sun Street, Barnwell. The younger Wilkins, responsible for Downing College and London's National Gallery during his career, designed a new theatre nearby to replace the 1807 building.

The building is on the south side of the Newmarket Road in the northeastern Cambridge suburb of Barnwell. Completed in 1816, the theatre was sited outside the boundary of the town owing to prohibition of theatrical entertainment; the Plays and Wine Licences Act 1736 (10 Geo. 2. c. 19) by the "An Act for the More Effectual Preventing the Unlawful Playing of Interludes within the Precincts of the Two Universities..." forbade the performance of all plays and operas within five miles of the town).

On his father's death in 1815, Wilkins inherited the leases of the new site and six other theatres – Norwich, Bury St Edmunds, Colchester, Yarmouth, Ipswich and King's Lynn – and continued to run them. Proprietorship passed to his son, W Bushby Wilkins, and a succession of lessees, but the Norwich circuit declined, despite hosting readings by Charles Dickens. The theatre closed in 1878 and became a nonconformist chapel.

== Cambridge Festival Theatre ==
Terence Gray (1895–1986) leased the building in 1926 and reopened it as the Cambridge Festival Theatre. The alleyway between the street and the building was enclosed to form a foyer. The interior was modernised, with the proscenium arch widened by the removal of the private boxes, and the introduction of electric lighting, a brick cyclorama and an early example of a revolving stage. The theatre was the country's "first permanent indoor performing space to be based on the design of a Greek open-air theatre".

The 'Festival' name reflected Grey's intention (unfulfilled) to promote summer festivals. The opening production on 22 November 1926 was Oresteia, with choreography by Ninette de Valois.

Gray retired from the theatre in 1933 and wrote on Taoism under the pseudonym "Wei Wu Wei". Norman Marshall worked at the theatre from 1926 and was its director from 1932 to 1933. Herbert M. Prentice was also involved with the theatre; in April 1927 he directed George Bernard Shaw's Androcles and the Lion there.

From 1927, Joseph Macleod was an actor and producer at the theatre, and in 1933 he became the theatre's director and lessee. Five of Macleod's plays were staged there, including Overture to Cambridge (1933) and A Woman Turned to Stone (1934). Under Macleod, the theatre became known for avant-garde productions, and the staging of lesser known works by major playwrights. Macleod staged some of Ezra Pound's Noh plays, and also some Ibsen and Chekhov (his company, The Cambridge Festival Players, was one of the first in the UK to stage Chekhov's play The Seagull). The theatre was obliged to close due to financial difficulties in June 1935.

The building was recorded as Grade II* listed in 1950. From 1962, it was used by the Arts Theatre as a workshop and store.

In March 1995, the student Marlowe Society renovated the Festival Theatre and mounted a single run of The Lady Of Pleasure, by James Shirley - a play that had not been performed for 350 years.

== Today ==
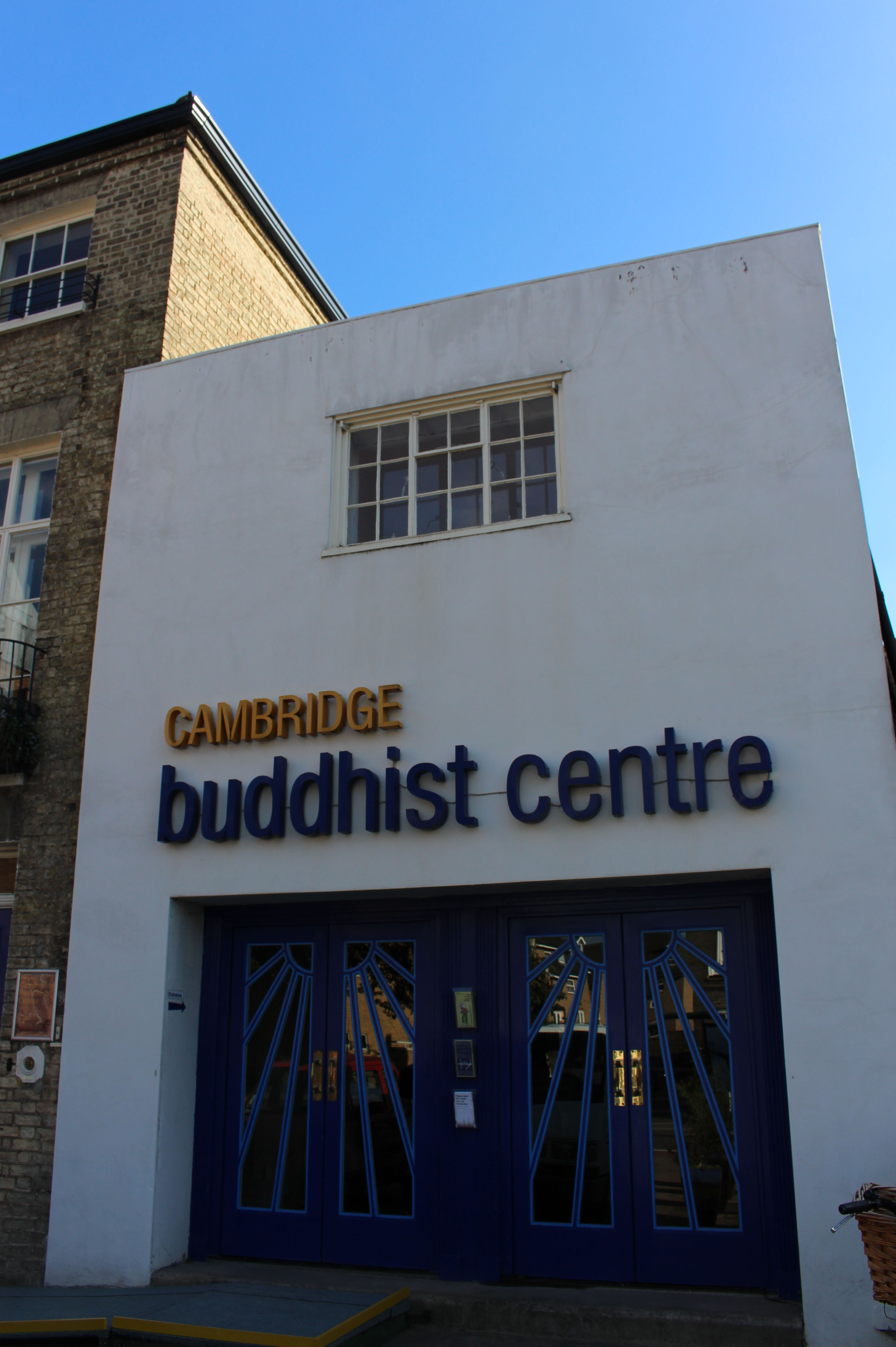
Entrance in 2013

Since 1998 the building is in use as a Buddhist centre.

Historic England describe the interior as "a virtually complete example of a Georgian theatre with a three-tiered horseshoe auditorium with the galleries supported on cast iron columns." and state that a painting of the Royal Arms remains above the proscenium.

== Sources ==
- Searby, Peter (1988). A History of the University of Cambridge: Vol 3: 1750–1870. Cambridge University Press. ISBN 978-0-521-35060-0.
