= ExecuJet Aviation Group =

Swiss aviation company

ExecuJet
- Industry: Aviation
- Founded: 1991; 35 years ago in Johannesburg, South Africa
- Headquarters: Strassen, Luxembourg
- Key people: Mike Berry (CEO); Nicholas Luyckx (CFO)
- Services: Business aviation Fixed-base operations
- Number of employees: 1,000+
- Website: www.execujet.com

ExecuJet (officially ExecuJet Aviation Group) is an international business aviation company headquartered in Strassen, Luxembourg. The company is part of the Luxaviation Group; one of the world's largest private aircraft operators.

ExecuJet operates in Africa, Asia Pacific, the Caribbean, Europe, Latin America, and the Middle East. ExecuJet's services include aircraft management, charter, fixed-base operations (FBO), and completions consulting.

Founded in 1991, at Lanseria Airport in Johannesburg, South Africa, the company operates a global fleet of over 133 aircraft.

== History ==
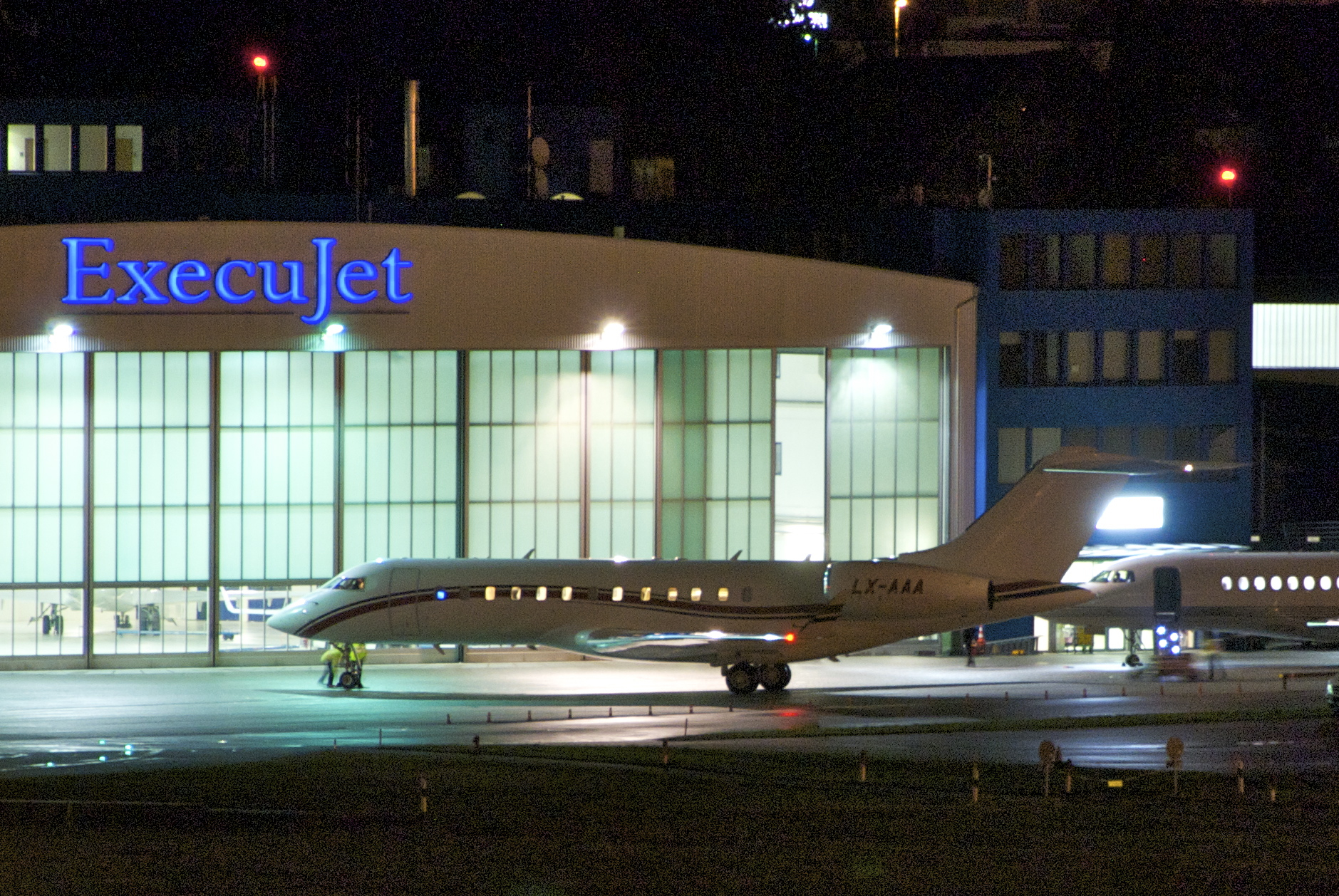
Bombardier Global Express in front of an ExecuJet building

ExecuJet started operations as a maintenance provider at Lanseria Airport in Johannesburg, South Africa in 1991. The facility was appointed in 1993 as a Major Service Centre by Honeywell (formerly Allied Signal) and a Learjet Authorised Service Facility by Bombardier.

In 1994, the firm extended its offering by including services, deployed in concert with a Bombardier Business Aircraft sales franchise. In 1995, the firm became a Canadair-authorized service facility. In 1997, it opened in Denmark as ExecuJet Scandinavia.

In 1999, the company established operations in the Middle East, with a base in Dubai, and the Bombardier sales franchise expanded to 10 Middle Eastern countries.

ExecuJet Australia was founded in 2000 and awarded dealership rights for Australia, New Zealand, and the Pacific. It included an aircraft management and maintenance center at Sydney Airport. The facility was also appointed as Bombardier Authorised Service Facility and Gulfstream authorized warranty repair facility.

ExecuJet expanded its European operations in 2001 with an aircraft management business, a Fixed Base Operation (FBO) and its offices in Zurich became the headquarters for ExecuJet. Bombardier adds Switzerland to ExecuJet's business aircraft dealership.

In 2002, ExecuJet expanded its services into Latin America with operations at two Mexican Airports in Monterrey and an extended facility at Lanseria.

In 2008, ExecuJet acquired a hangar at Singapore's Seletar Airport, where it still oversees maintenance activities. The firm was also granted an Air Operator's Certificate (AOC) for the United Kingdom. Representative offices were opened in Mumbai, Beijing, and Moscow.

In 2009, ExecuJet South Africa occupied a new FBO facility in Cape Town in anticipation of the 2010 FIFA World Cup. The wider firm was restructured around an OEM-independent business model. Later that year, ExecuJet Malaysia opened a maintenance base in Kuala Lumpur.

The company's operations in Australasia expanded in 2013, with the establishment of maintenance facilities in Perth.

In 2015, ExecuJet was acquired by the Luxaviation Group. Luxaviation is headquartered in Luxembourg, and with ExecuJet has a combined staff of 1,500 and a fleet of over 250 business jets. ExecuJet began operations in Bali in the same year. The acquisition of ExecuJet by the Luxaviation Group started the process of centralizing certain operational services in a shared services structure based in Cambridge.

In 2019, Luxaviation sold ExecuJet's Aircraft Maintenance business to Dassault Aviation and closed their FBO location at Cambridge City Airport, relocating all ExecuJet UK offices and employees to a new facility in Newmarket, Suffolk.

ExecuJet partnered with French airport management company EDEIS in 2021, to support European business aviation ground handling. In 2022, they bought out FBO Air Center One in Auckland to operate an FBO at Auckland Airport.

In 2024, the company launched its first fully electric ground handling fleet at Paris Le Bourget airport. This forms part of ExecuJet's target to achieve 100% electrification of its FBOs by 2030.

In December of the same year, ExecuJet opened a flagship, 15,000 square meter private jet facility at the Mohammad bin Rashid Aerospace Hub in Dubai South. Also in December 2024, the company expanded into Greece, in partnership with the JetSet FBO Network.

== Locations ==
ExecuJet operates out of 34 locations worldwide.

== AOC ==
ExecuJet holds 6 fixed, and 1 rotatory Air Operating Certificate (AOC) for Switzerland, the United Kingdom, Denmark, the United Arab Emirates, South Africa, Australia, and Mexico.

Execujet AOCs
Name	ICAO code	Callsign	Country	Notes
Execujet Australia PTY	IGA		Australia	AOC number: CASA.TAAOC.0118
Execujet Aviation (PTY) LTD	EXD		Isle of Man	
Execujet Europe AG			Switzerland	AOC number: CH.AOC.1020
Execujet Europe A/S	VMP	VAMPIRE	Denmark	AOC number: DK.AOC.039
Execujet Flight Operations	EXD	PLATINUM EXEC	South Africa	AOC number CAA/N996D
Execujet Middle East	EJO	MIDJET	United Arab Emirates	AOC number AT-0013
ExecuJet UK LTD	LCY	LONDON CITY	United Kingdom	
