= Luxaviation Group =

Luxaviation
- Industry: Aviation
- Founded: 2008 in Luxembourg
- Headquarters: Strassen, Luxembourg
- Website: www.luxaviation.com

Luxaviation Group is one of the largest private aircraft operators in the world headquartered in Strassen, Luxembourg.

Luxaviation Group operates in Africa, Asia Pacific, Europe, Middle East and the Americas. Their services include jet and helicopter management and charter, aircraft sales and acquisitions. The company comprises multi-faceted luxury services brands in the aviation sector, such as Luxaviation, Luxaviation Helicopters, Starspeed, and ExecuJet.

Founded in 2008, the company operates a fleet of 85 jets and 11 helicopters. Luxaviation is also the official supplier to the Court of the Grand-Duchy of Luxembourg.

== History ==
ExecuJet Africa was founded in Johannesburg in 1991.

One of the predecessor companies of Luxaviation was Abelag, founded in 1964 by André Ganshof van der Meersch in Grimbergen, Belgium. In 2013, Luxaviation Group acquired Abelag. In 2016, Abelag became Luxaviation Belgium, while Abelag Handling and Technics began trading as ExecuJet.

In 1997, ExecuJet opened its European operation in Denmark as ExecuJet Scandinavia.

ExecuJet Middle East was established in 1999 in Dubai, and later became one of the founding company members of the Middle East Business Aviation Association. In 2008, it gained EASA approval.

In 2000, ExecuJet Australia was founded.

In 2008, Luxaviation was founded, receiving its first AOC in 2009.

ExecuJet joined the Luxaviation Group in 2015.

By 2016, all former entities rebranded to become part of the unified Luxaviation Group. LEA became Luxaviation United Kingdom, Masterjet - Luxaviation Portugal, Switzerland and France, Unijet - Luxaviation France, Fairjets - Luxaviation Germany.

In 2017, the Luxaviation Group launched Luxaviation Helicopters and the first worldwide VIP helicopter management company.

In the same year, Speedstar, a global helicopter management, charter and training company, was acquired by Luxaviation.

In 2019, Luxaviation Fine Wines was launched.

In 2024, Luxaviation Group acquired Paragon Aviation Group.

In the same year at the MEBAA Conference, the International Business Aviation Council announced the company as its 19th industry partner.

In 2025, Luxaviation Group strengthened its partnership with Haffner Energy by securing a 15-year non-exclusive offtake agreement in Europe, establishing fixed SAF volumes and price terms.
