= Barnwell Priory =

Former priory in Cambridge, England

Coordinates: 52.2096°N 0.1390°E

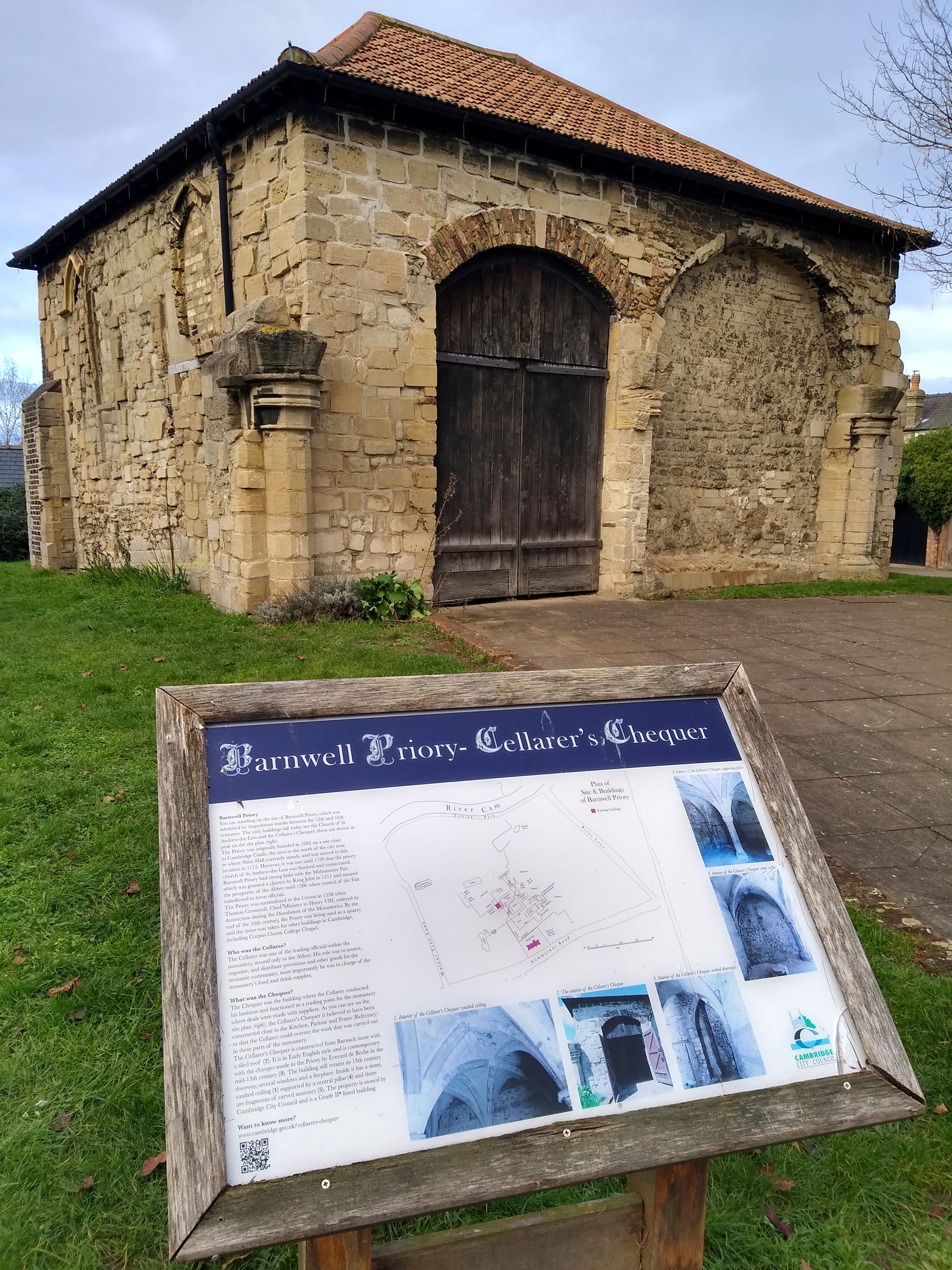
The Cellarer's Chequer, part of the old Barnwell Priory in January 2021

Barnwell Priory was an Augustinian priory at Barnwell in Cambridgeshire, founded as a house of Canons Regular. The only surviving parts are 13th-century claustral building, which is a Grade II* listed, and remnants found in the walls, cellar and gardens of Abbey House.

The priory was home to the Barnwell chronicler, an anonymous chronicler who wrote about the reign of King John.

== History ==
The priory was founded in c.1092 by Picot of Cambridge, High Sheriff of Cambridgeshire, as a house of canons regular in St Giles' Church by Cambridge Castle. The Liber Memorandorum Ecclesie de Bernewelle (the Book of Things to do with Barnwell) says that Picot's wife, Hugolina, had been gravely ill and vowed that if she recovered, she would found a religious house. She recovered: although Picot endowed the priory, it could well have been on his wife's instructions. Two other East Anglian houses of canons regular were founded around this time: Colchester Priory and Huntingdon Priory. It is likely that Picot's foundation was established using canons from one of these houses, probably Huntingdon (whose canons later went to found Merton Priory). Canons regular followed the Rule of St Augustine. Picot endowed the six brethren with an income from tithes and with a number of rectories.

After Picot and Hugolina's death, the priory fell into the hands of Henry I, who then gave it to Pain Peverel. Not much is known about Pain Peverel, but he had ambitions for the priory, and persuaded Henry to grant him land on the eastern edge of Cambridge so that he could move and expand the priory, which now became Barnwell Priory. These lands increased by donations from local landowners, and over time the priory itself grew in size and strength until there were 30 canons in residence. Barnwell held an annual fair, the Barnwell or Midsummer Fair, which added to its income.

Having an active scriptorium, well-stocked library and, because of its role as landlord, plenty of business for attorneys, Barnwell seems to have helped the early University of Cambridge become established.

Much of what we know of the details of English Augustinian life come from the Barnwell Observances, written in the 13th century.

The priory was wealthy, and its position as local landowner meant that it was a target during the Peasants' Revolt (1381). The English Parliament met here for the only time in what was known as the Cambridge Parliament between 10 September and 17 October 1388.

The priory was dissolved on 11 November 1538 as part of the general Dissolution of the Monasteries and granted to Anthony Brown c.1546 and Edward, Lord Clinton c.1552. The buildings became ruinous and were almost thoroughly destroyed in 1810.

== Gallery ==
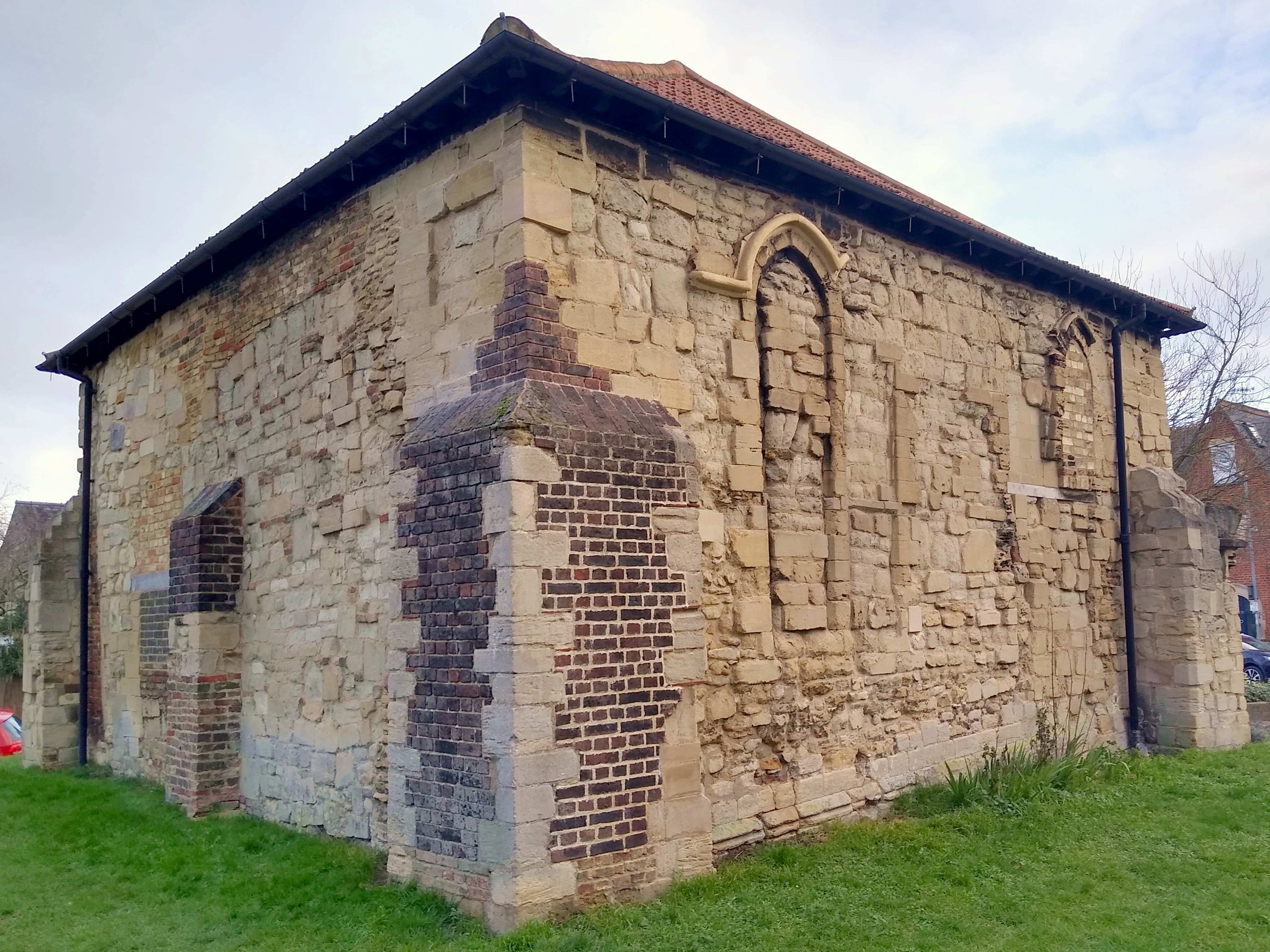
Exterior from the west

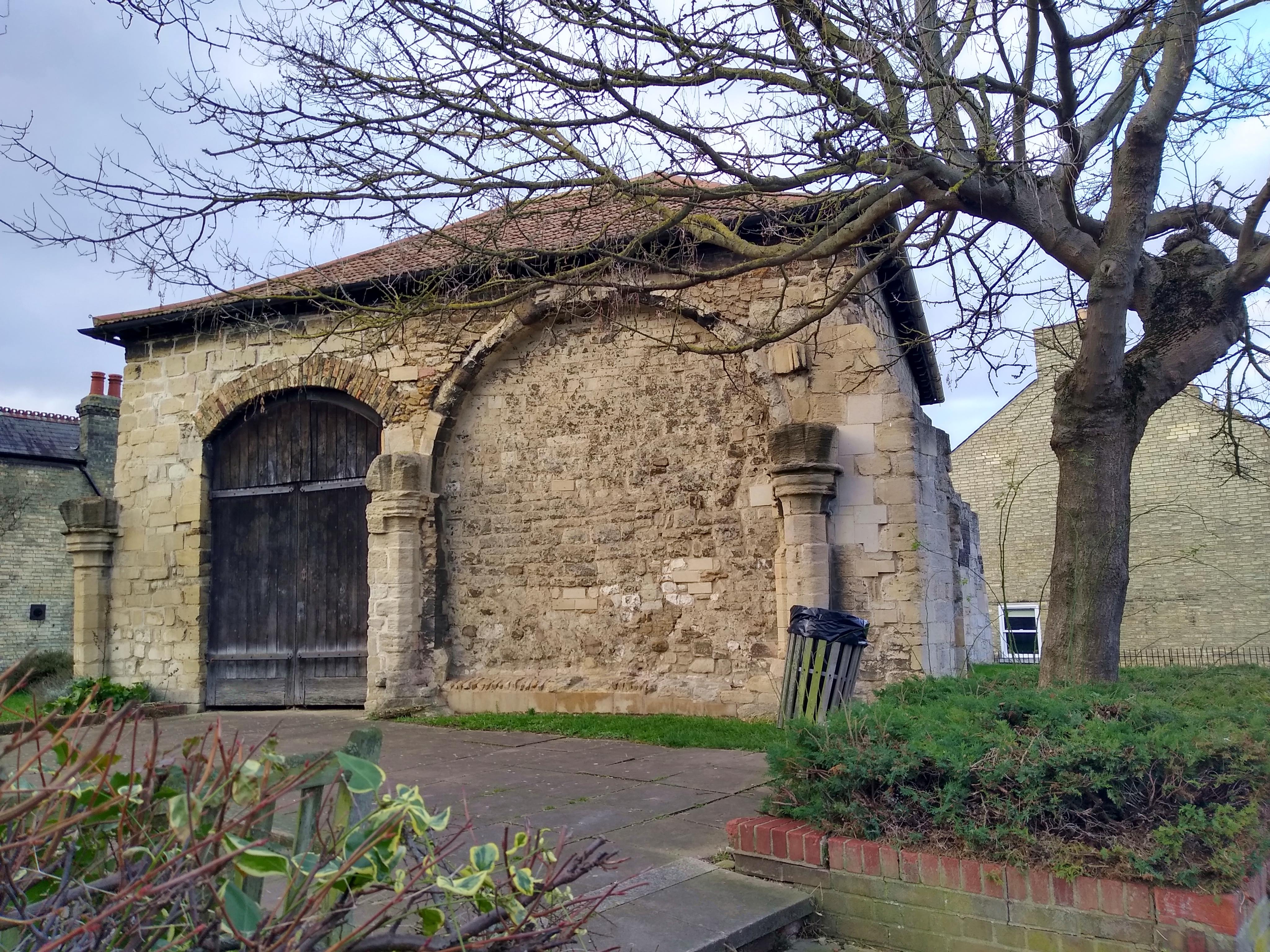
Exterior from the east

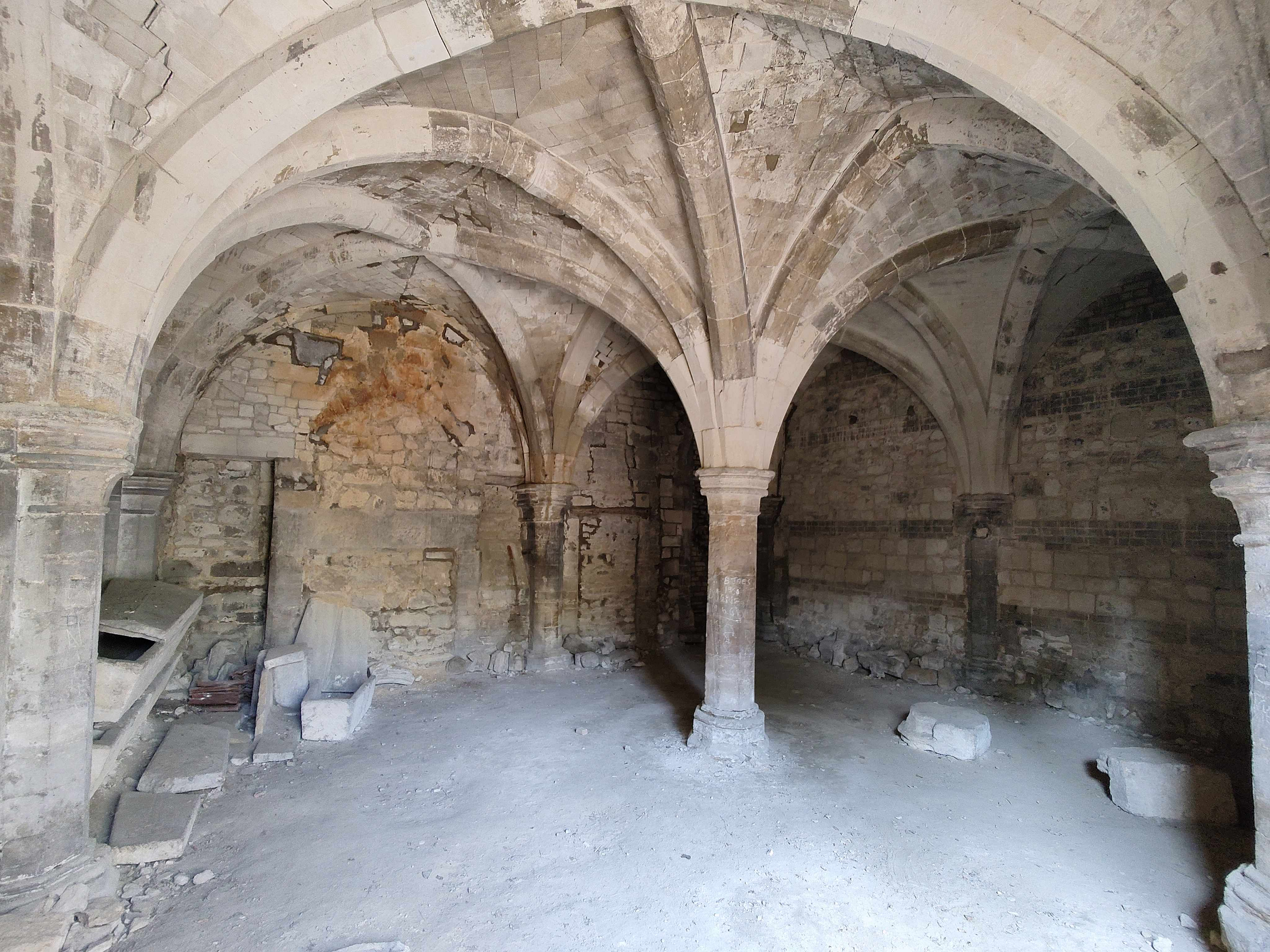
Interior from the south

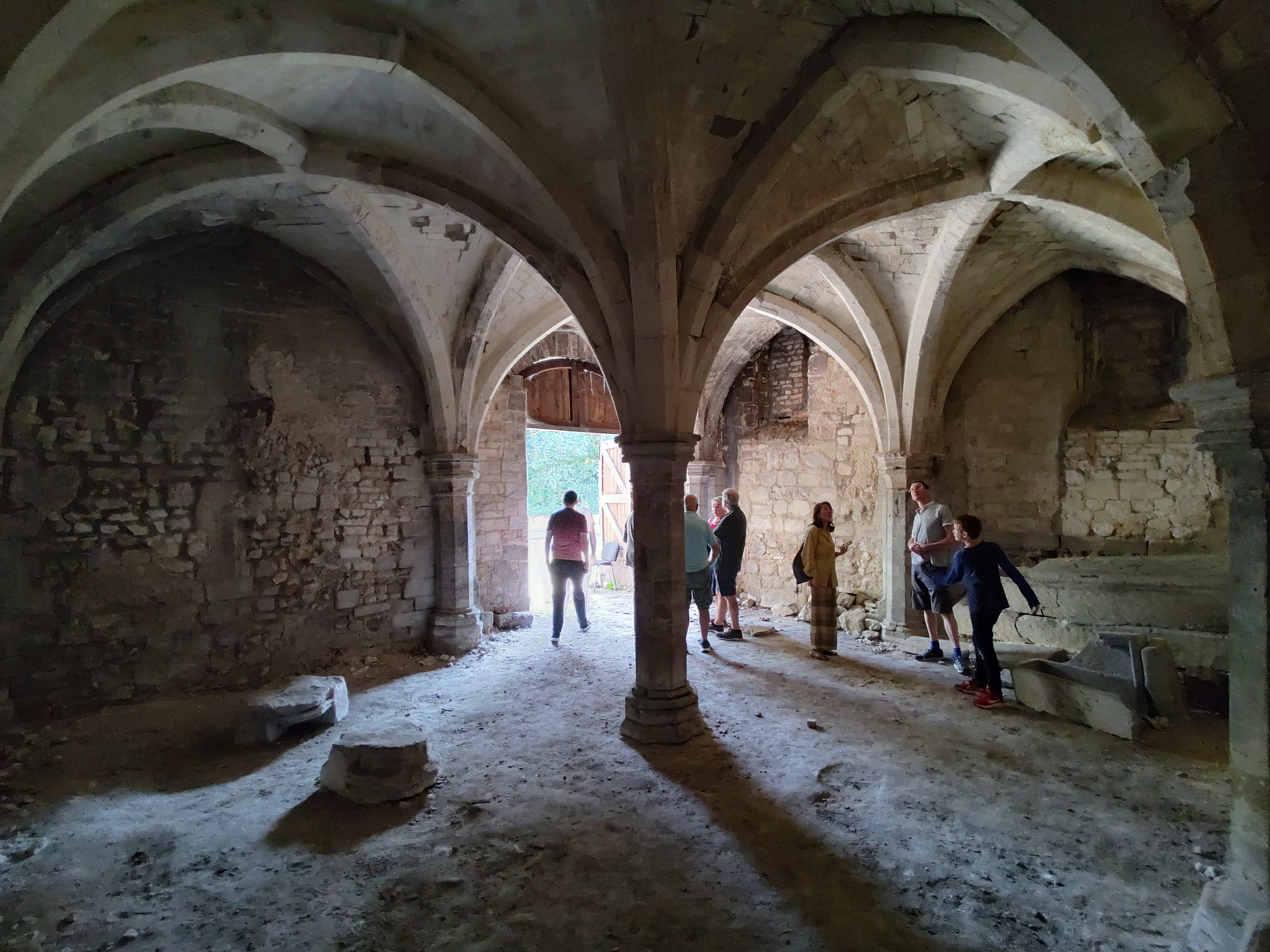
Interior from the north

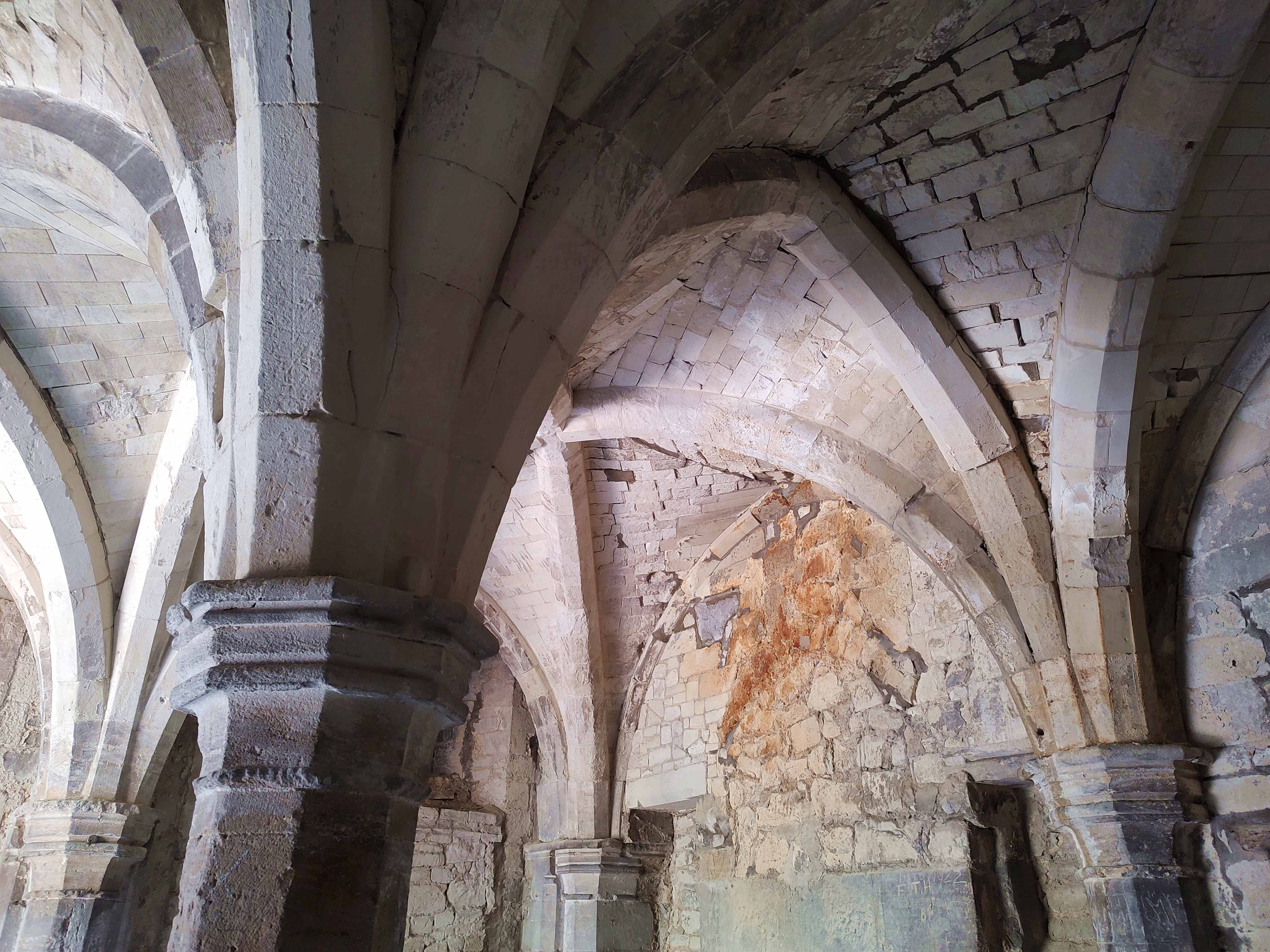
Column capital and ceiling

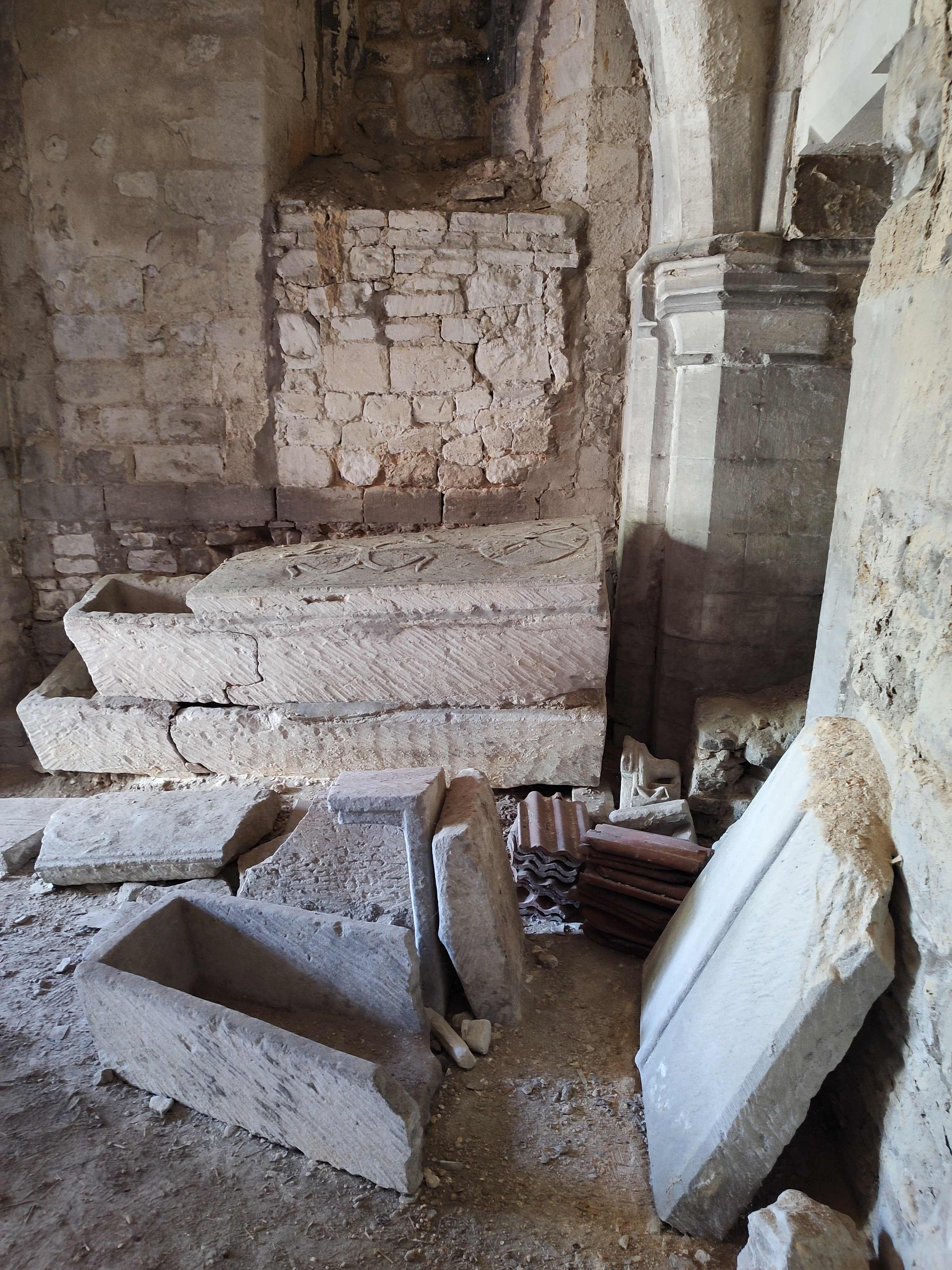
Coffins stored inside

== See also ==
- Leper Chapel, Cambridge, also in Barnwell
