= Harold Tomlinson =

British architect

Harold Tomlinson (1899–1951) was a 20th-century British architect.

Tomlinson was based at the University of Cambridge School of Architecture. There he supervised the Scottish architect Frank James Connell.

The current ADC Theatre used by the Cambridge University Amateur Dramatic Club in Park Street, central Cambridge, was designed by Harold Tomlinson and W.P. Dyson. It reopened in 1935 after a fire that destroyed the original building in 1933.

Tomlinson also designed the main building for Cambridge Airport south of Newmarket Road on the eastern edge of the city. This was constructed during 1936–37 and the airport opened in 1938.

== Bibliography ==
- Harold Tomlinson, "Towards a New Architecture." In Irena Murray and Julian Osley (editors), Le Corbusier and Britain: An Anthology. Routledge, 2008. ISBN 978-0-415-47994-3.
