= Leper Chapel, Cambridge =

Church in Cambridge, England

Coordinates: 52.2139°N 0.1526°E

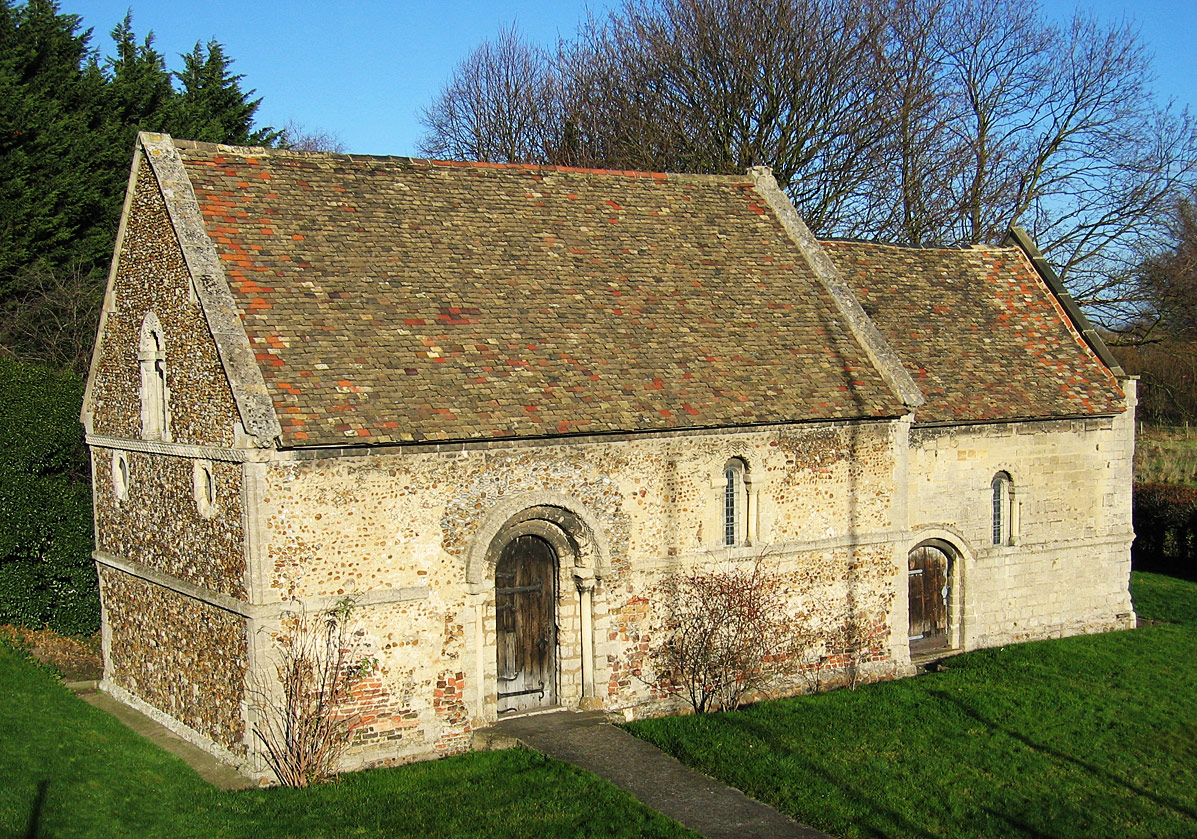
The Leper Chapel, Cambridge

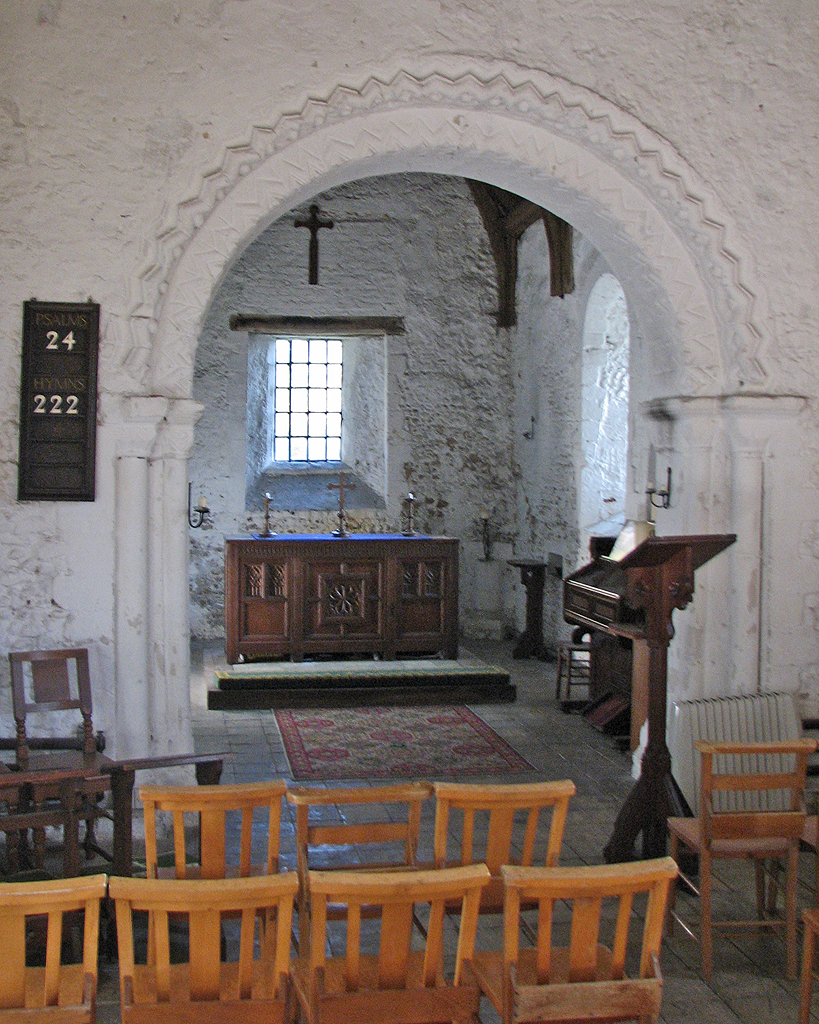
Interior of the chapel

The Leper Chapel, also known as the Leper Chapel of St Mary Magdalene, is a chapel on the east side of Cambridge, England, off Newmarket Road close to the railway crossing at Barnwell Junction. It dates from about 1125.

The chapel was part of the buildings of a leper hospital that stood a little beyond the outskirts of the city on the road to Bury St Edmunds. Parts of the east wall are original, but most of the rest of the chapel was rebuilt in the 13th century. It still retains many Romanesque features.

In 1199, the chapel was given royal dispensation by King John to hold a three-day fair in order to raise money to support the lepers. Starting in 1211, the fair took place around the Feast of the Holy Cross (14 September) on Stourbridge Common which lies a little way behind the chapel and continues down to the River Cam.

Stourbridge fair grew to become the largest medieval fair in Europe and raised so much money that the post of priest at the Leper Chapel became one of the most lucrative jobs in the English church. The job was also a sinecure, since the leper hospital had ceased to admit new lepers in 1279, and what few lepers remained were moved to a new colony near Ely. The chapel had no parish, so there was no need to maintain any religious services. Under legislation of 1546, the chapel was closed and its property assumed by the Crown. The town and university of Cambridge battled over the rights to the fair until Queen Elizabeth I ruled in favour of the town, reserving the university's rights to control weights, measures and quality of goods. The chapel was thence used only to store the stalls for the next fair and, in the 18th century at least, as a pub during the fair. After 1751, there were no further religious services held at the chapel. In 1783 it was advertised for sale as a storage shed. The fair was abolished in 1933, though it was later revived in the 21st century and is now held annually at the Leper Chapel.

In 1816, the chapel was bought and restored by Thomas Kerrich. Kerrich gave the chapel to the University, which in turn gave it to the Cambridge Preservation Society in 1951.

The chapel is a Grade I listed building and is maintained by Cambridge Past, Present and Future (CPPF). It is again being used for worship and it is now part of the Parish of Christ the Redeemer. The "Friends of the Leper Chapel" was formed in 1999 to promote use of this chapel for education, cultural events and worship. The chapel also plays host to a range of local cultural activities such as dramatic performances, and it is frequently used by the local theatre group In Situ for their performances of Shakespeare.

== See also ==
- Barnwell Priory, founded c.1092; a square stone-vaulted building remains
- St Bene't's Church, dating from 1033
- Holy Sepulchre, Cambridge or Round Church, dating from 1130
- School of Pythagoras, dating from around 1200
