= Huntingdon Priory =

Former Augustinian Priory in Huntingdon, United Kingdom

Coordinates: 52.333°N 0.183°W

The Priory of St Mary, Huntingdon was an Augustinian Priory in Huntingdonshire (now Cambridgeshire), England.

Its foundation date is unknown. Dugdale suggests that it was a re-foundation of an Anglo-Saxon canonry; this is a credible idea, as several other Austin priories were (e.g. Taunton Priory). As a house of canons regular, it was founded by Eustace de Lovetot, sheriff of Huntingdon - apparently in compensation for his rapacity as sheriff. (Since there was a similar story about Picot, sheriff of Cambridgeshire, and his foundation of St Giles, later Barnwell Priory, this may be just a trope.) Eustace's heir, William, was a patron of the priory, and he also founded Worksop Priory, suggesting a family attraction to the Augustinians. The canons regular (not necessarily by this time formally Augustinian) were occupying the church by the 1090s. In or around 1098, Christina of Markyate’s mother was sitting looking out at the priory; a dove flew from it and landed on her sleeve - and so she knew her daughter to be blessed. Christina was taught by Sueno, a canon of Huntingdon. In 1114, Robert, the subprior, left Huntingdon to help Gilbert, sheriff of Huntingdon, Cambridgeshire and Surrey, found Merton Priory.

Henry I confirmed the priory's lands and gifts; his wife, Matilda of Scotland was one of the drivers behind the Augustinian movement in England and Wales. Her brother David I of Scotland was also earl of Huntingdon and a benefactor of Huntingdon Priory. William de Lovetot's son Richard was also a benefactor; his sons (William and Nigel) died without issue; his daughters (Amice, Rose and Margery) married local aristocrats, and through the eldest, Amice, the Priory became associated with the de Mandeville family.

The Priory had about 16 canons, and held a good number of lands and churches; its wealth was partly spent on hospitality. During the 14th century, it suffered both economically and from the Black Death. It seems to have suffered a moral decline in the 15th century: the 1420 episcopal visitation found too many laundresses wandering where they shouldn't; the 1435 visitation admonished the canons for pawning their jewels and keeping hunting dogs. It also prohibited canons from visiting the house of one John Clerk, whose wife was of questionable morality. In 1440, there was no question about her morality: she was having an affair with the prior (along with 8 other women). The buildings were in disrepair and more goods had been pawned. Successive priors, especially Thomas Herford (d.1518), made improvements, but the Priory had declined to poverty by 1532. The 12 canons were devout enough to pay a massive fine to stop it being suppressed in 1536 (being a monastery under £200), but this, in the end, only gave them two years extra in the house. In 1538, the eight remaining canons were pensioned off and the monastery destroyed.
