= Stourbridge fair =

Annual fair held in Cambridge, England

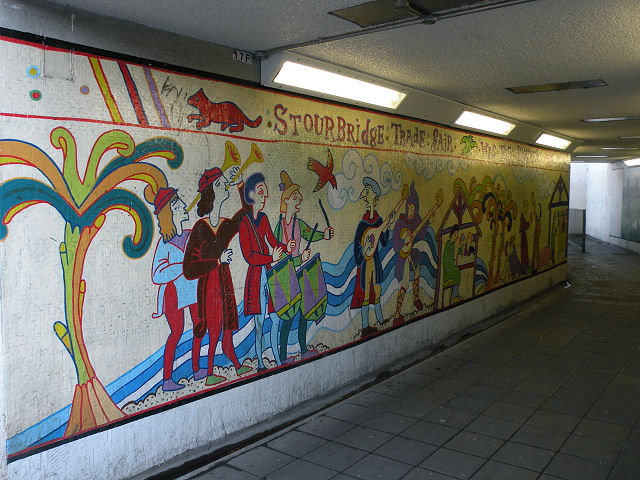
Mural in the Elizabeth Way underpass commemorating Stourbridge Fair

Stourbridge fair was an annual fair held on Stourbridge Common in Cambridge, England. At its peak it was the largest fair in Europe and was the inspiration for Bunyan's "Vanity Fair".

The fair was one of four important medieval fairs held in Cambridge: Garlic Fair, Reach Fair, Midsummer Fair and Stourbridge Fair.

== History ==
=== Origins ===
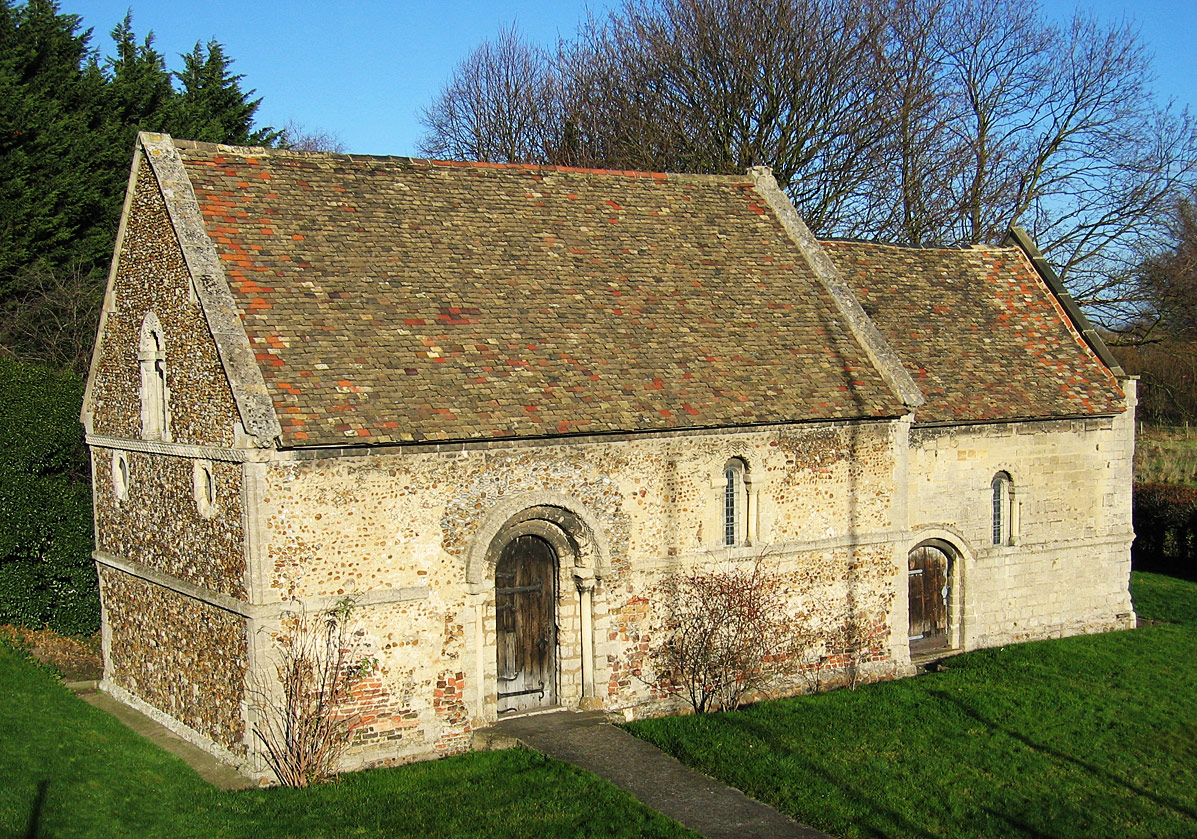
Leper Chapel, Cambridge

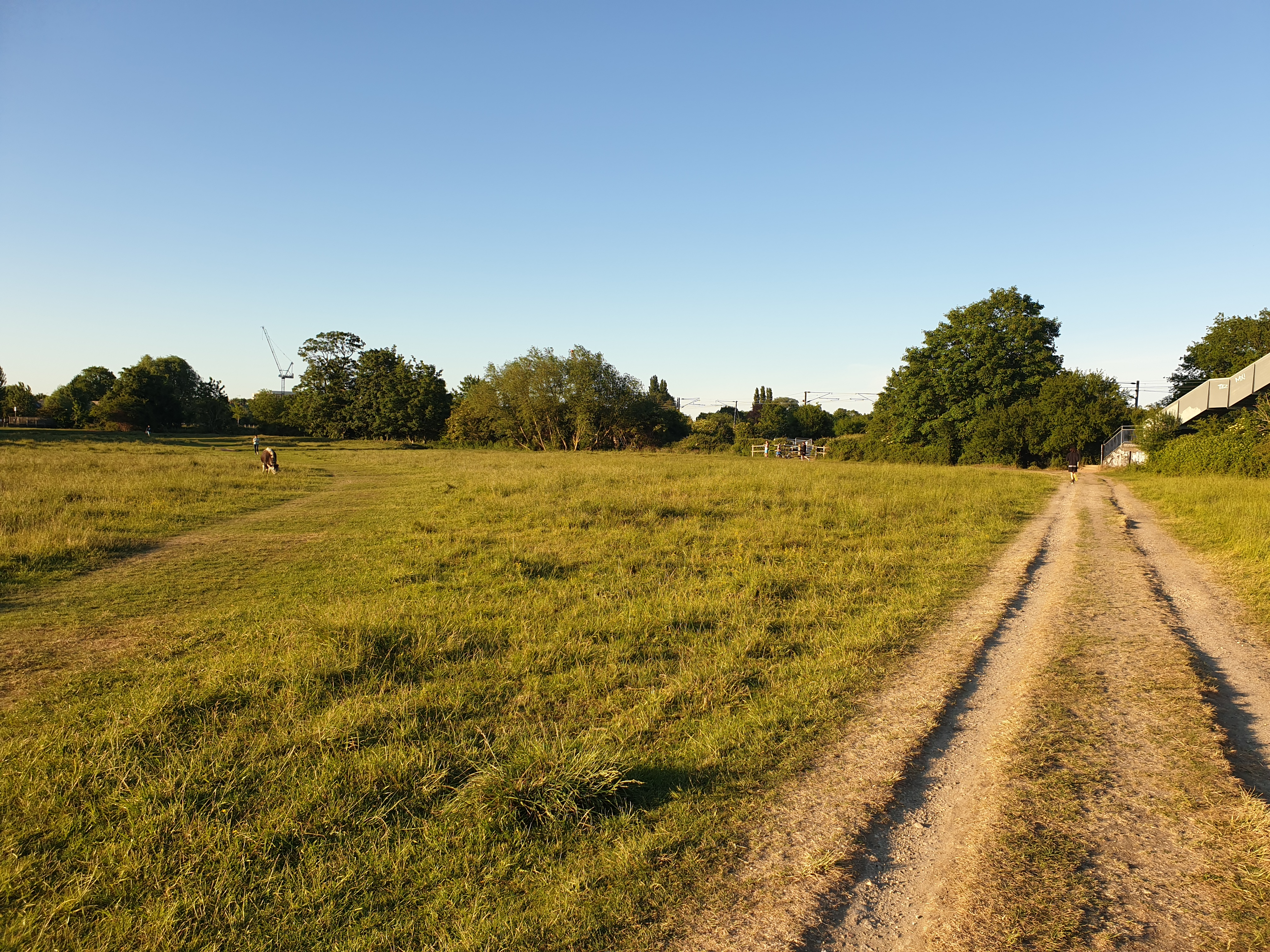
Stourbridge Common

In 1199, King John granted the Leper Chapel at Steresbrigge in Cambridge dispensation to hold a three-day fair to raise money to support the lepers. The first such fair was held in 1211 around the Feast of the Holy Cross (14 September) on the open land of Stourbridge Common alongside the River Cam.

The fair's location, with the river allowing barges to travel up the Cam from The Wash, and near an important road leading to Newmarket, meant that the fair was accessible to a large population. Despite its proximity to Cambridge, the charter prohibited anyone from imposing taxes on the commerce there.

During its history the fair was variously spelled "Stir-Bitch", "Stirbitch", "Stirbiche" and "Sturbridge", with its name derived from the "Steer Bridge" (i.e. a bridge for oxen), where the road to Newmarket crosses a small river that enters the Cam just to the east of the common (the name "Sture" or "Stour" now given to this river is a back-formation).

An 18th century rhyme offered another explanation:

Stirbitch Fair — its name it does derive
From some poor clothiers that from thence did thrive;
As they were travelling over the Brook Stour,
Their goods fell in and wetted were all o'er;
They hung them up in order for to dry,
And people bought them fast as they past by -—
Having such luck, together did agree,
That they the next year would come the same way;
Again they came, again success they found,
And 'stablish'd Stirbitch Fair upon that ground.

=== Markets ===
The fair contained markets for fish, wax, spices, timber, salt, cloth. Items such as these were often sold in high quantities at wholesale prices. These prices attracted rich merchants who in turn bought the luxury items that were for sale at the fair. The luxury items included pewter ware, glass, silks, velvets, linens, almonds, spices and iron goods. The fair had sections set aside for cheese sellers, shoemakers, ironmongers, horse dealers, and merchants of other trades.

The markets held specialized functions and did not directly compete with local shops. The markets brought in specialized imported goods that local shops had no stock in. The fair brought new fruits, spices, confections, crafts, and household wares that customers had never experienced before. There was competition within the market however. Merchants would price their products according to the prices posted near their shop. The prices of good were bargained between the seller and buyer. The price could change drastically depending on the bargaining and how much of the product was being bought.

The textile market was the largest of the fair. The textile market was vast because different qualities of textile denoted different social status. The fair's market was organized such that visitors of high status only had to encounter shops that sold high quality textiles. Linen cloth, however, was available in a wide range of costs and types.

=== Success ===
As the fair grew to become the largest in Europe the prosperity of the Leper Chapel was assured, with the position of a priest there among the most lucrative jobs in the Church of England. In the late thirteenth century the leper colony closed, and the fair was handed over to the town of Cambridge.

As the annual fair became more successful still, the right to control it became the subject of a battle between the town of Cambridge and its well-established University until in 1589 Elizabeth I confirmed the right of the town to collect the fair's profit, but controversially granted the university the right to oversee the organisation of the fair, as well as controlling quality. The once flourishing chapel became merely the store for the stalls, and in the eighteenth century was even used as a pub.

Originally running for only two days, by 1589 the fair lasted from August 24 to September 29, with the 1589 charter stating that it "far surpassed the greatest of and most celebrated fairs of all England; whence great benefits had resulted to the merchants of the whole kingdom, who resorted thereto, and there quickly sold their wares and merchandises to purchasers coming from all parts of the Realm". Holding the fair in September allowed farmers to sell goods in the quiet period between harvest and ploughing, and the fact that it was out of term time meant that University tradesmen could also participate.

Local barrister Jacob Butler, who, in 1714, inherited Abbey House and the surrounding land, which played host to the fair, reportedly attempted to re-establish the ancient custom that stalls still standing on Michaelmas could be demolished, by driving his carriage through piles of uncleared crockery.

=== Decline ===
Stourbridge and other general fairs began losing their influence in the 1600s. After 1660 retail customers and wholesalers began to only use fairs as a means to buy agricultural goods and cloth. The local provincial and metropolitan shops began to be the place where the wealthy were purchasing expensive textiles and novelty products. Another reason for the fair's demise was that visitors were starting to venture out of the fair and into local shops to spend their money. This was a better experience for travellers compared to going from merchant booth to merchant booth.

Due to the local availability of expensive textiles and other luxury items, the fair became a place strictly for wholesale commerce. Merchants cared less about displaying the novelty goods they had to sell but more about making orders of large quantity wholesale goods. The fairs became less attractive to travellers and locals alike.

In the late eighteenth century, the popularity of the fair began to decline, partly due to the arrival of canals and improved roads leading to the decline in the importance of rivers as a means of navigation. The fair only lasted a fortnight, and the amount of income it generated for the town had fallen. By the nineteenth century, the fair served more as a means of entertainment than being of economic importance, and was only a few days in length. As the Victorian town grew, the common became surrounded by poor housing, and the rich visitors became disinclined to visit a potentially dangerous area. The Midsummer Fair, on the other hand, was in a more convenient central location and the Stourbridge Fair fell out of favour.

Stourbridge Fair continued until 1933 (there would then be a gap of over 70 years before its revival) when the fair was opened by the Mayor of Cambridge, Florence Ada Keynes (mother of John Maynard Keynes), attended by the Clerk of the Peace and the Sergeant-at-Mace "in the presence of a couple of women with babies in their arms and an ice-cream barrow."

=== Revival ===
The fair was revived in 2004. After the 2019 event, due to COVID-19 restrictions, there was no Fair until 2021. The modern fair is a free community event with dancers, musicians and storytellers, and stalls, activities and history talks.

== Visitors ==
King's Hall purchased cod, stockfish, salmon, herring, lob, sturgeon, cat fish, and salted eels, together with raisins, prunes, almonds, pepper, dates, cloves, mace, sugar, saffron, and bay salt at the fair as well. During the seventeenth and eighteenth century, the fair's national status was underlined by writers such as Samuel Pepys and Edward Ward who wrote of the experience. John Bunyan used the event as the inspiration for the Vanity Fair in Pilgrim's Progress, which in turn was used by William Makepeace Thackeray for his most celebrated novel.

During his time at the university in 1665, Isaac Newton visited the fair and is known to have bought a copy of Euclid's Elements which he used to teach himself mathematics. He is also believed to have acquired optical instruments including a pair of prisms, which he used to demonstrate that white light could be split into the colours of the spectrum.

Daniel Defoe visited the fair and wrote at length of it in his Tour through the whole island of Great Britain, stating:

"this fair, which is not only the greatest in the whole nation, but in the world; nor, if I may believe those who have seen them all, is the fair at Leipzig in Saxony, the mart at Frankfort-on-the-Main, or the fairs at Nuremberg, or Augsburg, any way to compare to this fair at Stourbridge."

He described the huge variety of merchandise, with stalls including "goldsmiths, toyshops, brasiers, turners, milliners, haberdashers, hatters, mercers, drapers, pewterers, china-warehouses, and in a word all trades that can be named in London."

=== Collegiate ===
Medieval Cambridge was brought into prosperity by the Stourbridge fair. The institutions that benefitted as a result of fair supported its continued existence. The Cambridge colleges got fish and spice from the fair, even King's college often ventured to the fair to gain stock on the same items. The fair was essential to the start of college life in Cambridge as its timing was the same as the start of a new school term. Heaps of coal would be bought from the fair for the schools. The Cambridge colleges came to rely of the influence and intake of goods that the fair brought in.

London merchants were sent to the fair on behalf on wealthier colleges looking to secure goods for the upcoming year. These merchants were solely interested in securing contracts and buying high quantities of wholesale goods. As time went on the fair become dominated by long-distance lines of credit. By the 18th century the fair was becoming less approachable to people looking to buy outside of contract.
