= Barnwell Junction railway station =

Disused railway station in Barnwell, Cambridgeshire

Barnwell Junction
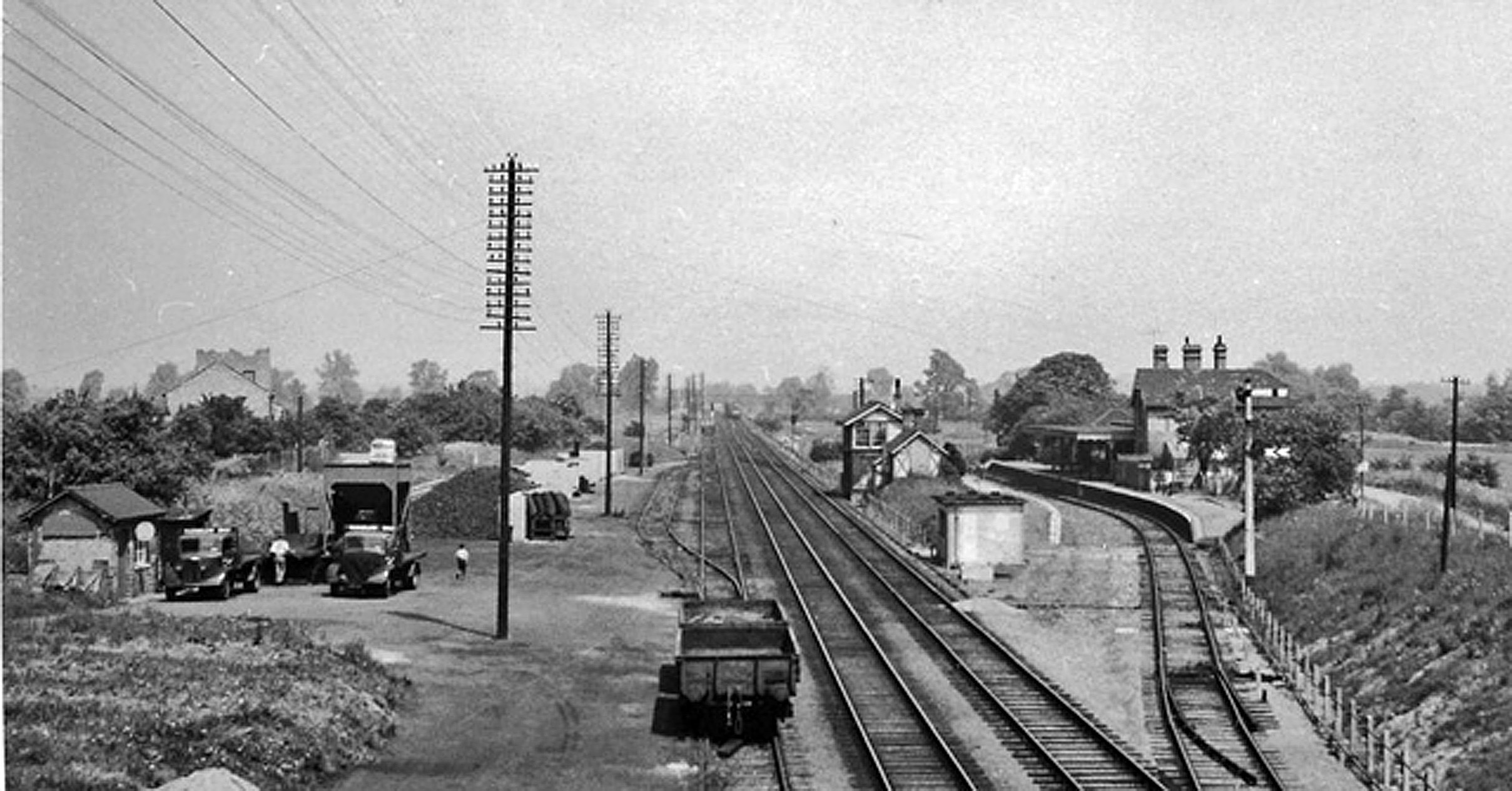
- Barnwell Junction railway station in 1963

General information
- Location: Barnwell, Cambridgeshire; England
- Coordinates: 52.215°N 0.153°E
- Grid reference: TL471596
- Platforms: 2

Other information
- Status: Disused

History
- Original company: GER
- Pre-grouping: GER
- Post-grouping: LNER; British Rail (Eastern Region)

Key dates
- 2 June 1884: Opened
- 18 June 1962: Closed to passengers
- 31 October 1966: Closed completely
Location

Barnwell Junction railway station served the suburb of Barnwell, Cambridgeshire, England from 1884 to 1966 on the Cambridge to Mildenhall railway.

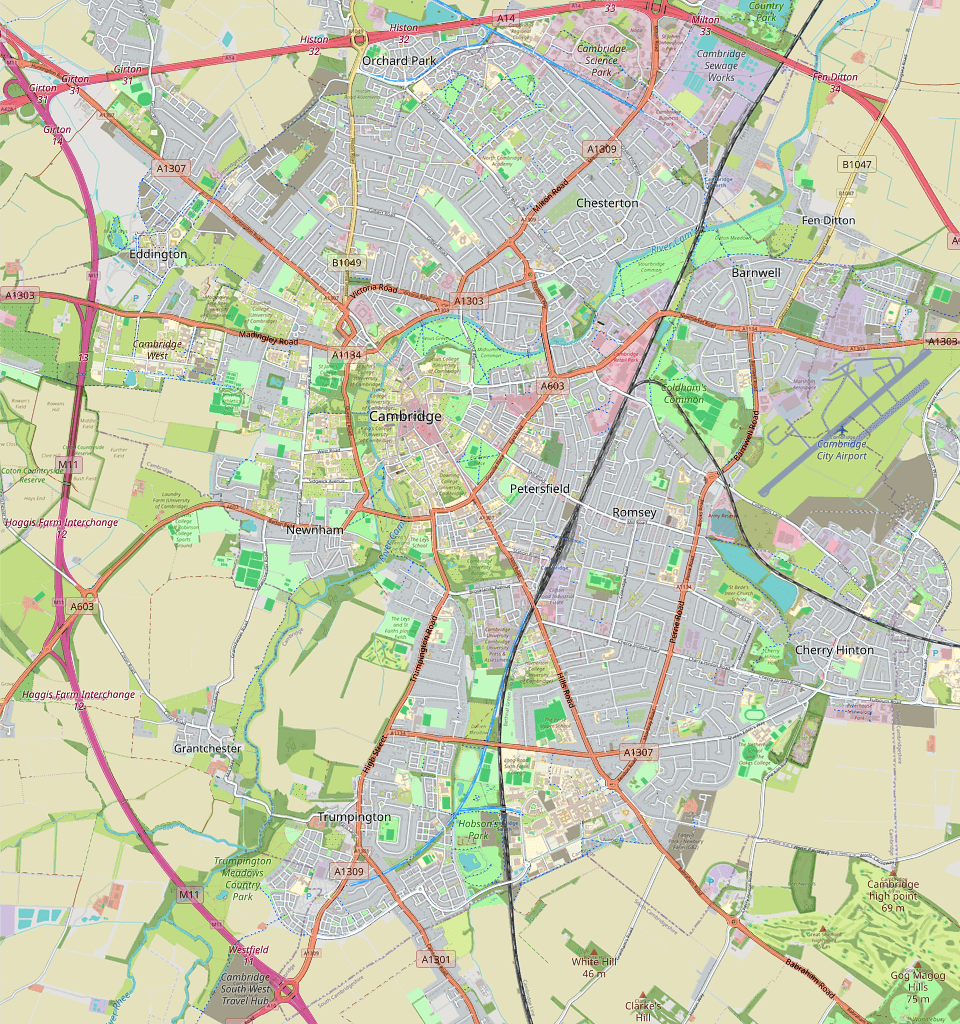
Cambridge railway stations map
(current in bold, closed in italics)

== History ==
The station opened on 2 June 1884 by the Great Eastern Railway. It was situated at the end of a road that ran north of the A1303. Except for parcels, the station had no goods facilities. During World War I and World War II, the station was used to unload ambulance trains. The final passenger train was on 16 June 1962 and the station closed two days later, on 18 June 1962 and closed to goods traffic on 31 October 1966.

== Site today ==
As at January 2024 the station buildings and platforms are in situ with track still laid in one platform. The station buildings are in use as a private residence.

Preceding station	Historical railways	Following station
Cambridge; Line closed, station open	Great Eastern Railway; Cambridge to Mildenhall railway	Fen Ditton Halt; Line and station closed
