= Abbey House, Cambridge =

House in Cambridge, England

Coordinates: 52.2091°N 0.1385°E

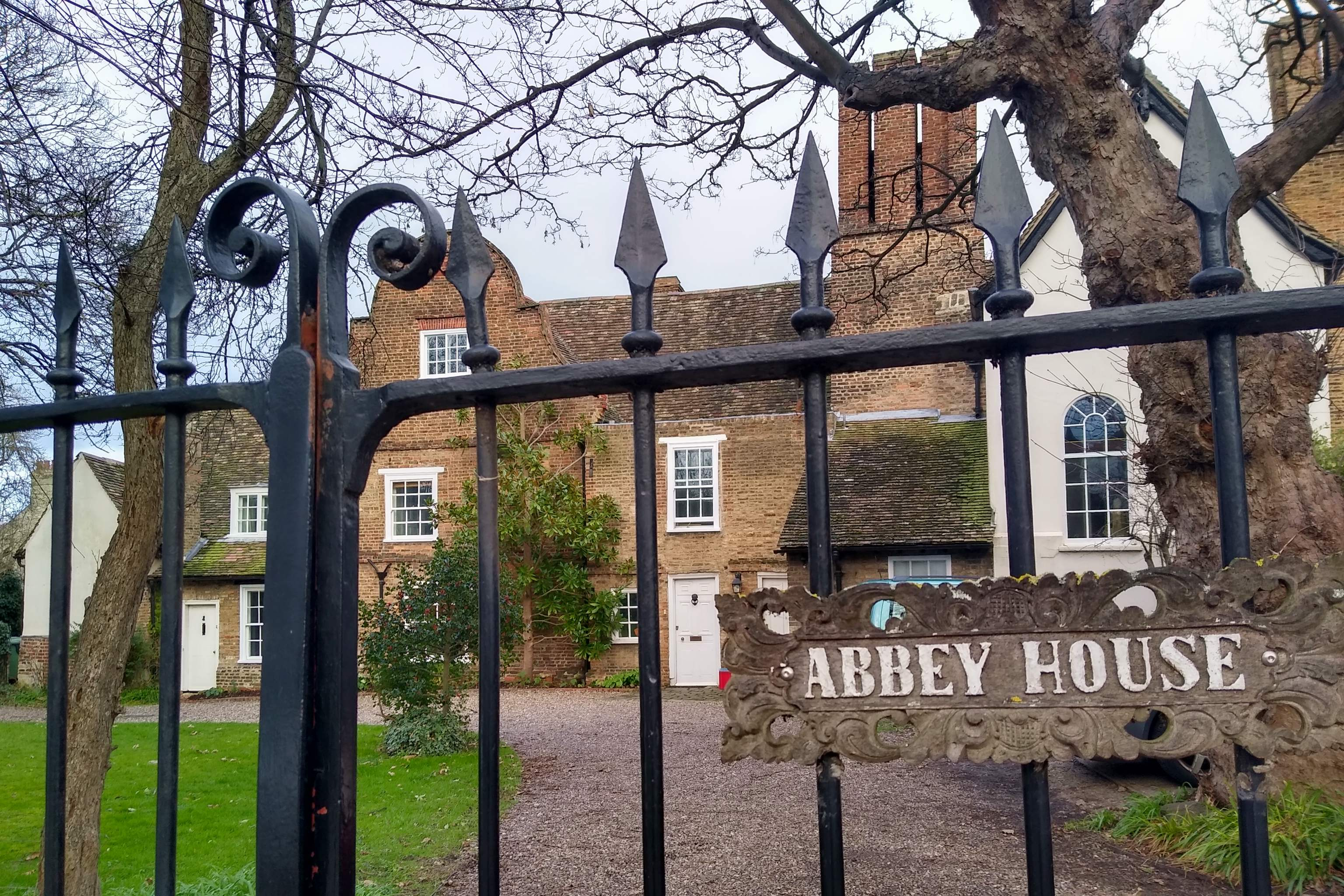
Abbey House in January 2021

Abbey House or Old Abbey House is a 17th-century house on the corner of Beche Road and Abbey Road in Abbey, Cambridge. It lies just to the east of the roundabout where Elizabeth Way and Newmarket Road meet. The house is 17th-century but perhaps containing parts of earlier date; it has two storeys with attics. The house is a Grade II listed building; the walls and archway are separately listed Grade II. It has been described as both the oldest inhabited house and the most haunted house in the city.

== History ==
Abbey House was built by Alexander Butler on the site of Barnwell Priory (dissolved 1539) and parts of the old ecclesiastical buildings can be found in the walls, cellar and gardens of the house. Local barrister Jacob Butler inherited the house and much of the surrounding land, which played host to the annual Stourbridge Fair, in 1714, but lost it in a legal dispute prior to his death in 1765. His tall fierce-looking ghost and that of his dog Wolfie have been reportedly sighted in his old home.

The house's reputation for being haunted came to local prominence during the occupancy of Prof. J. C. Lawson of Pembroke College from 1904 to 1910, on the family's first night in residence members of the household were reportedly woken at midnight by a crashing sound, and from 1907 onward, Lawson and others reported seeing the ghost of a nun wrapped in a dark robe, who failed to respond to questioning but stood at the foot of Mrs Lawson's bed sighing during a protracted illness, while children of another family resident in the house at that time reportedly received regular visitations from this nun, who they did not like very much.

A local woman, who lived in the northern end of the house from 1904 to 1911, later reported that she had heard stories of the Grey Lady prior to her residency. According to these local legends the house was haunted by the spirit of a nun from nearby St Radegund's Priory who used an underground passage, marked by a bricked up archway in the house's cellar, to meet with a canon at Barnwell Priory who was her secret lover. According to some versions of the legend, the nun was walled up by her fellow nuns as punishment for her indiscretion.

The Lawsons and others also reported seeing ghostly animals in the house's gardens, including a well-fed red squirrel, which vanished when approached, and a large hare, which sat watching witnesses before disappearing.

In the 1920s, reports of Mrs Ascham, wife of the owner, repeatedly seeing a disembodied female head at the foot of her bed reached Prof. F. J. M. Stratton of Gonville and Caius College, later President of the Society for Psychical Research, who rented the house for a month and reported muttering and singing coming from an empty room.

Urban Huttleston Broughton, 1st Baron Fairhaven of Anglesey Abbey gifted the house to the people of Cambridge at the end of World War II in celebration of the cessation of hostilities. The house was subsequently rented by the Cambridge & County Folk Museum until 1973 and a series of private tenants, including Mr Young and his daughter, who reported strange noises which caused their dog to cower in the corner of the room in the early 1960s, and Prof. Peter Danckwerts of Pembroke College, who researched the history of the house. There were further reported sightings of the Grey Lady up until 1986, around which time the house was exorcised by three clergymen.

In 2002, following the death of the last leaseholder the previous year, the council put the house on the market for £700,000 and sold it to the Friends of the Western Buddhist Order, who as part of the contract agreed to open the house to the public.

== Gallery ==
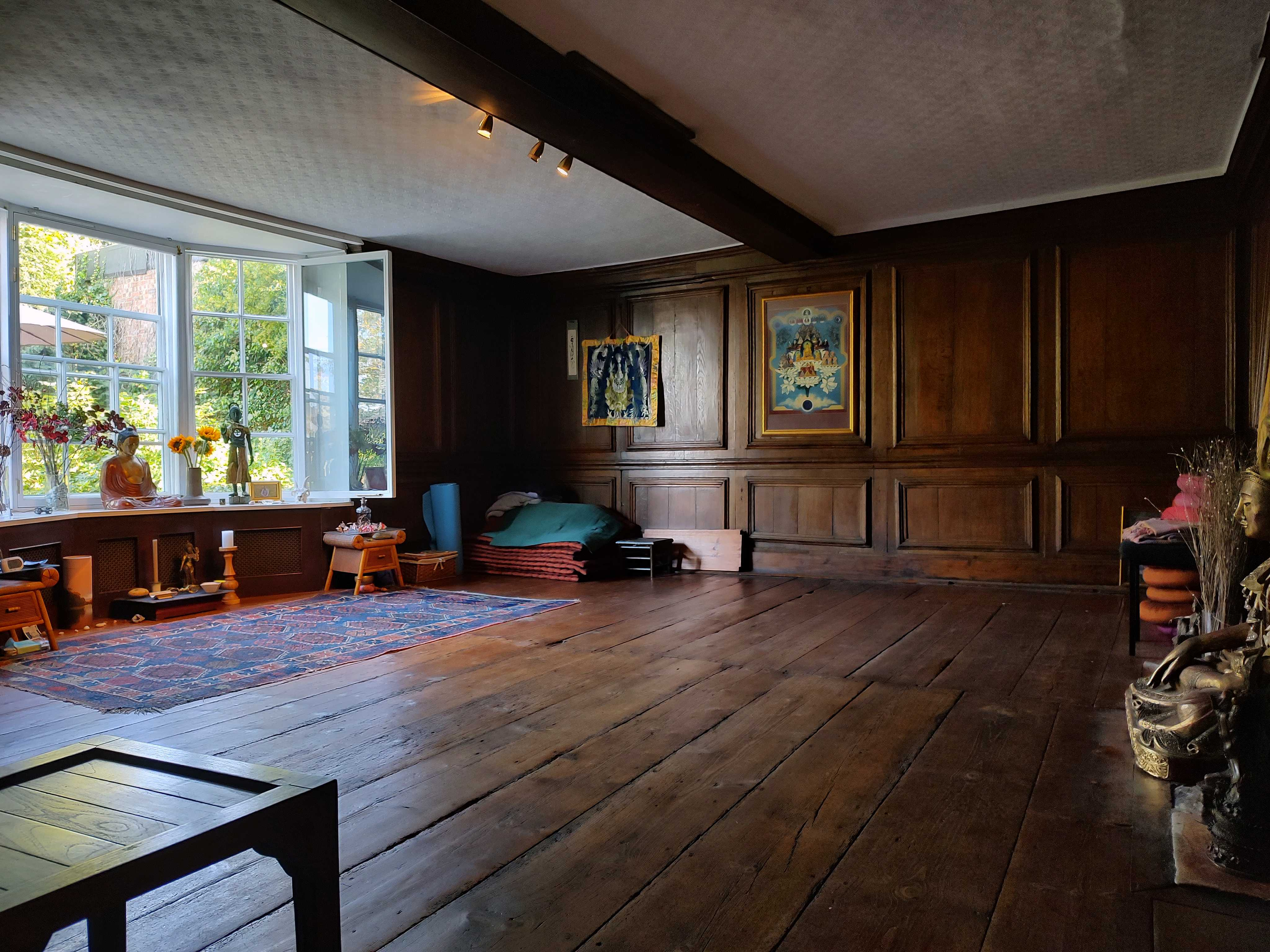
A downstairs room

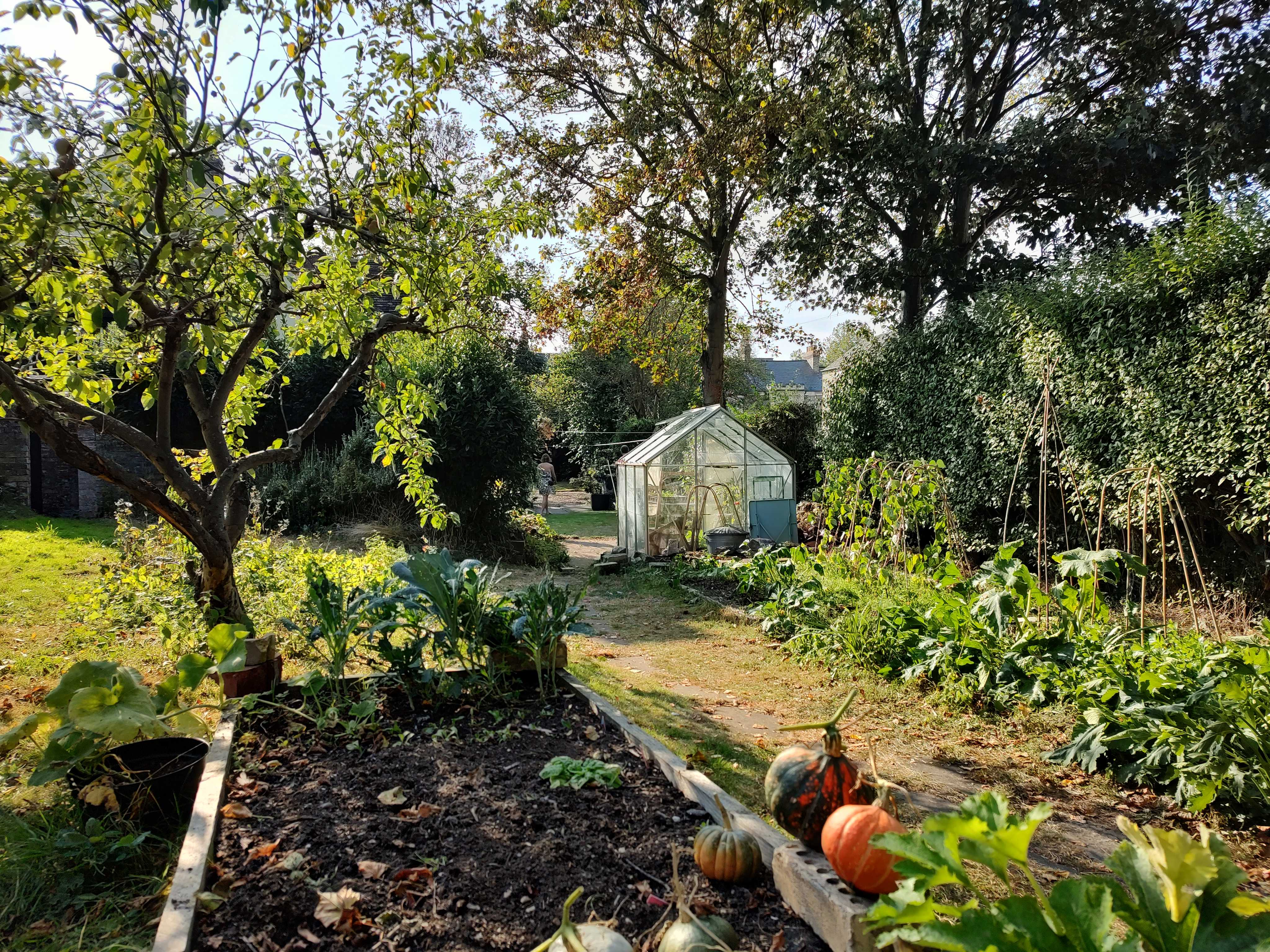
Vegetable garden

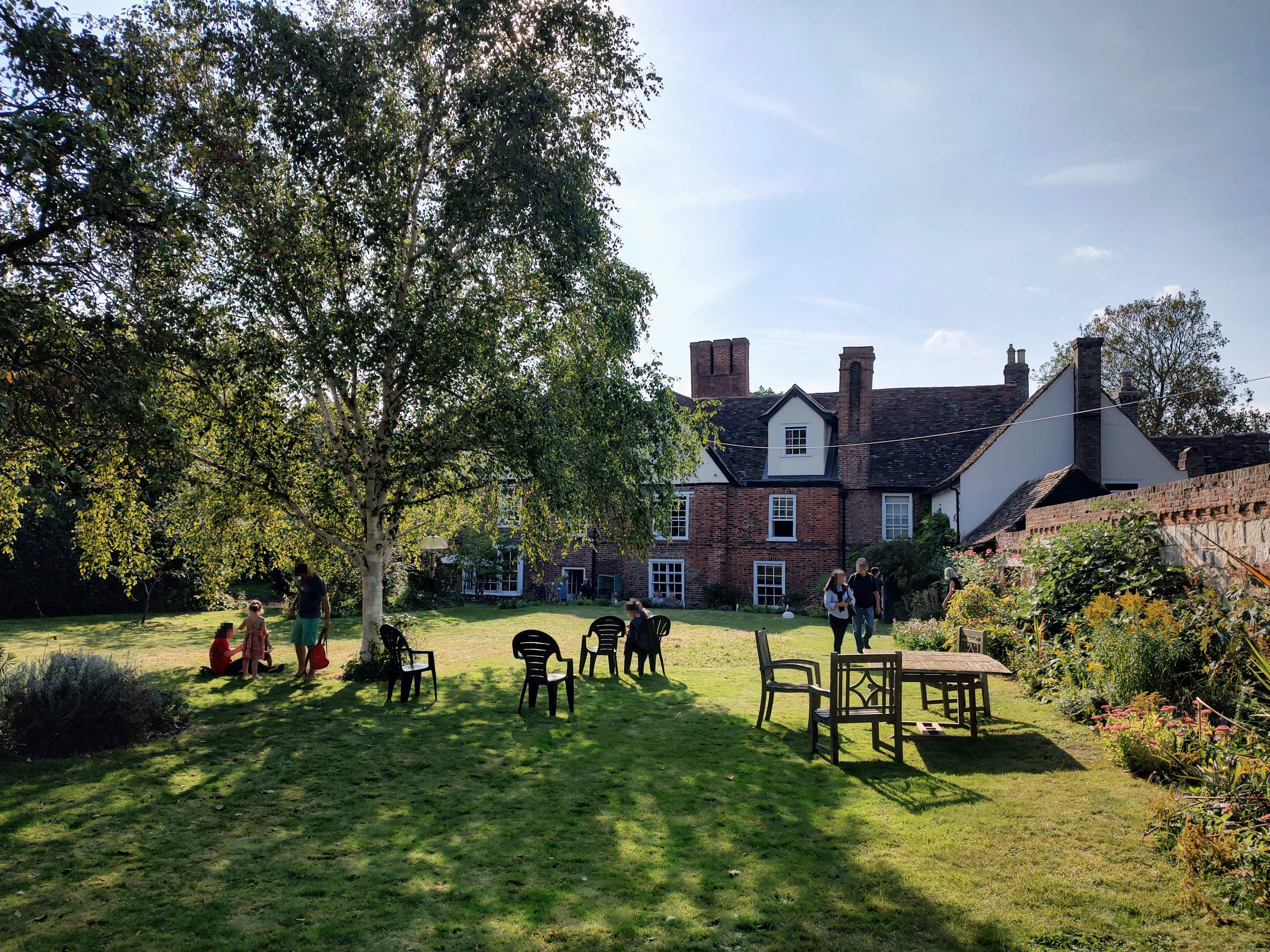
View from back lawn

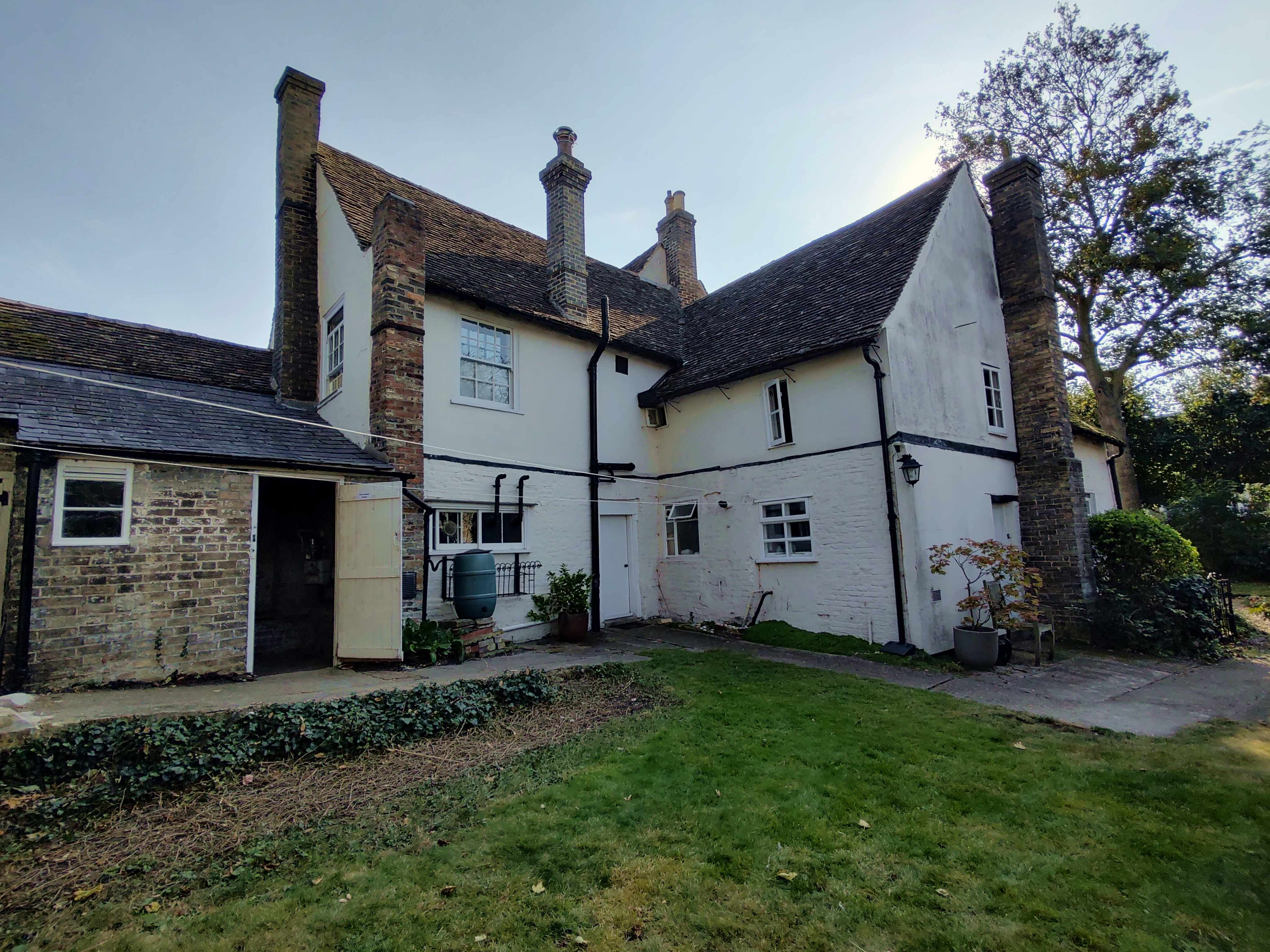
View from the side

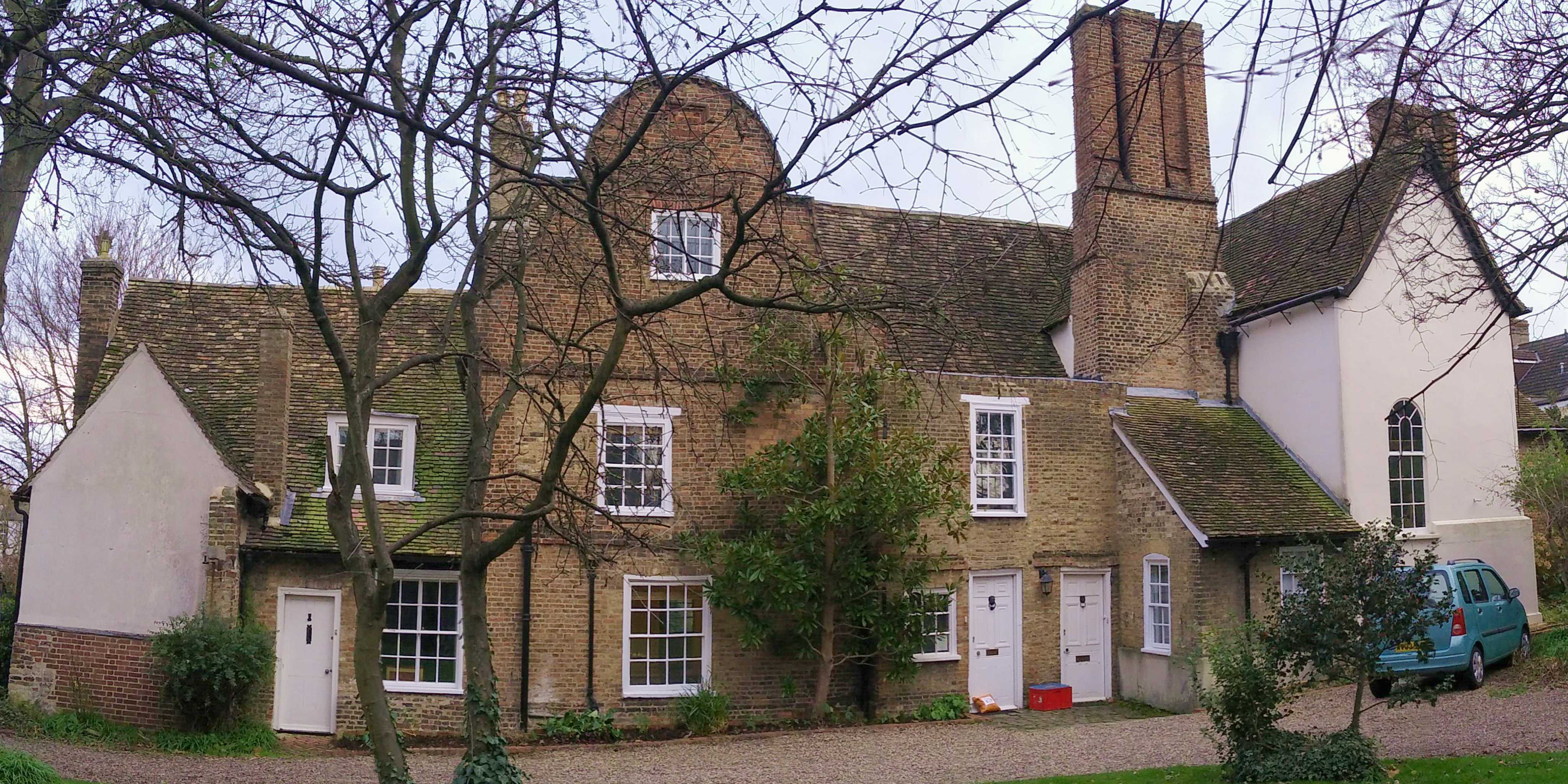
Stitched panorama
