= Barnwell Chronicle =

English chronicle

The Barnwell Chronicle is a thirteenth-century Latin chronicle named after Barnwell Priory, near Cambridge, where the manuscript was kept. Its anonymous author is well-regarded by historians. J. C. Holt described the Chronicler as "The most intelligent and valuable" and "perceptive" writer of his time.

The Chronicler gives the fairest account of the reign of King John of England of any contemporaries describing him as a "great prince". He indicates that John's reforms of 1213 were worthy of being remembered. The Chronicler disliked foreigners and regrets John's use of foreign mercenaries, blaming them for the initial failures against the French invasion in 1215. The Chronicle implies John's failure was due to bad luck.

The Chronicler also wrote of the reign of Henry III, regarding the struggle against the rebel barons as a crusade against infidels, and comments upon the increasing French acculturation in Scotland.

== See also ==
- Walter of Coventry
