= Cambridge City Airport =

Airport in Cambridgeshire, England

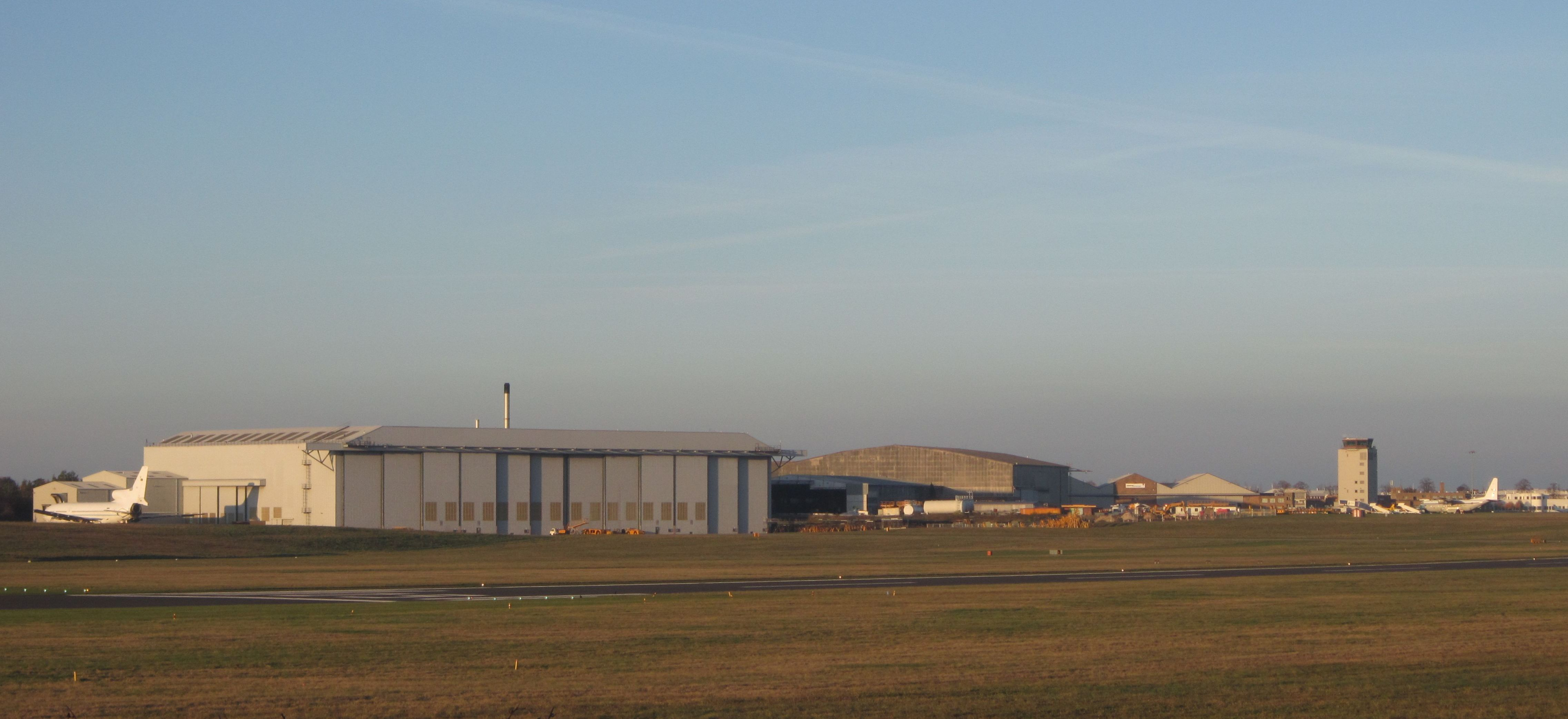
- IATA: CBG; ICAO: EGSC

Summary
- Airport type: Public
- Operator: Marshall Aerospace
- Serves: Cambridge
- Location: Cambridge and Teversham, Cambridgeshire, England
- Opened: 1938; 88 years ago
- Passenger services ceased: 24 March 2016
- Elevation AMSL: 47 ft (14 m)
- Coordinates: 52°12′18″N 000°10′30″E
- Website: www.cambridgeairport.com

Map
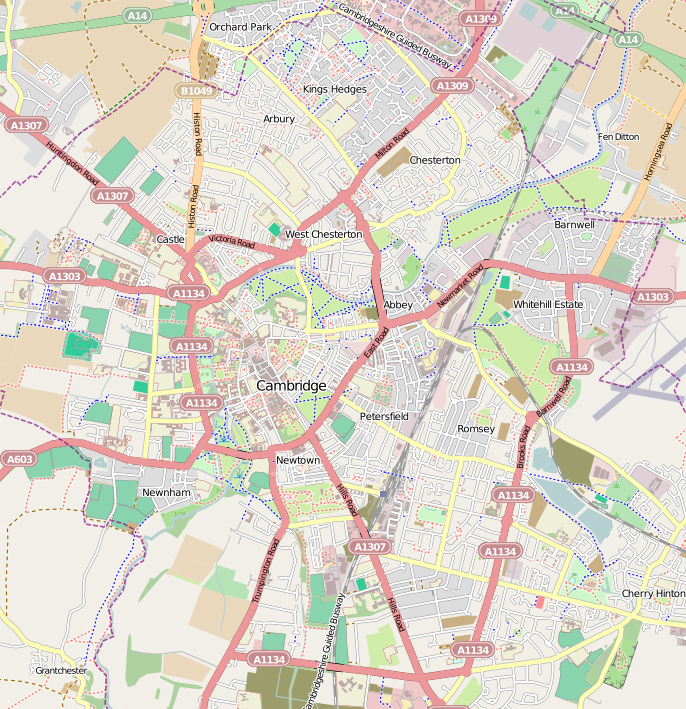
- Location in Cambridge CBG/EGSC (Cambridgeshire)

Runways
Direction	Length		Surface
Direction	m	ft	Surface
05/23	1,965	6,447	Grooved asphalt
05G/23G	899	2,949	Grass
10/28	439	1,440	Grass

Statistics
- Aircraft Movements: 21,768
- Sources: UK AIP at NATS; Statistics from the UK Civil Aviation Authority

Cambridge City Airport (IATA: CBG, ICAO: EGSC) — previously Marshall Airport Cambridge UK — is a regional airport in Cambridgeshire, England. It is located on the eastern outskirts of Cambridge, south of Newmarket Road and west of the village of Teversham, 1.5 NM (2.8 km; 1.7 mi) from the centre of Cambridge and approximately 50 mi (80 km) from London.

Marshall of Cambridge Aerospace Limited has a CAA Public Use Aerodrome Licence (Number P433) that allows flights for the public transport of passengers or for flying instruction. The airport is available for corporate and private use, and is home to four flying schools.

Since 2016, there have been no public scheduled flights from the airport.

== History ==
=== Early years ===
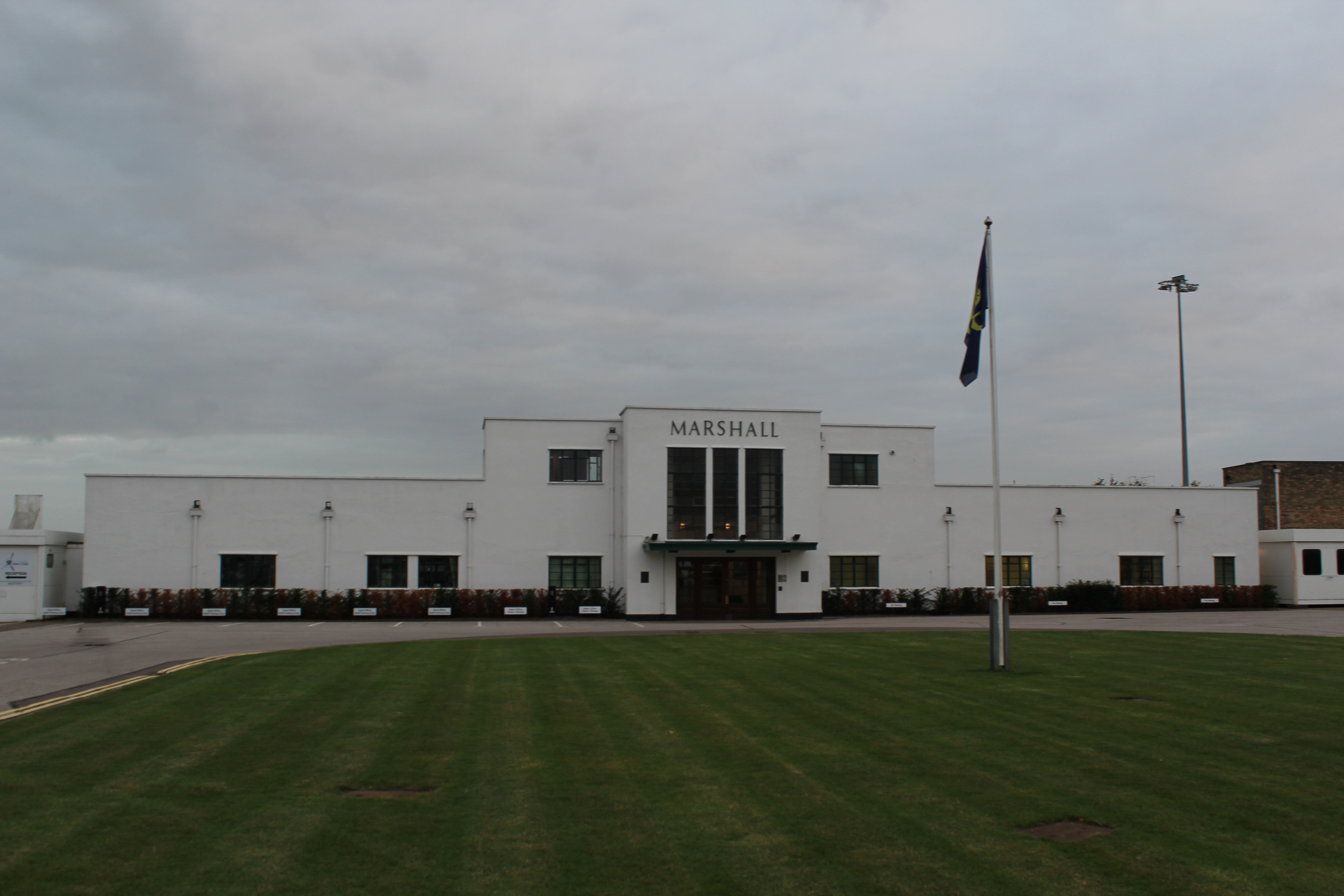
The airport main building (opened 1938)

Opened in 1938, when it replaced the old airfield at Fen Ditton, the airport is owned and operated by Marshall Aerospace, a Cambridge-based company with many years' history servicing civilian and military contracts. The main building, which is a Grade II listed building, was designed by the architect Harold Tomlinson of the University of Cambridge and constructed in 1936–37. For many years it was the base for the Cambridge University Air Squadron.

During the Second World War the site was used by the Royal Air Force as RAF Cambridge.

The following units were here at some point:

- No. 2 Civilian Anti-Aircraft Co-operation Unit RAF (July 1951 - March 1953)
- No. 2 Squadron RAF between 1 August and 24 October 1940 with the Westland Lysander II & III
- No. 4 (Supplementary) Flying Instructors School RAF (July 1940 - January 1942) became No. 4 Flying Instructors School RAF (January - April 1942) became No. 4 Flying Instructors School (Elementary) RAF (April 1942 - April 1943)
- No. 5 Air Experience Flight RAF (July 1958 - September 1966 & September 1967 - ?)
- A detachment from No. 16 Squadron RAF between 3 and 15 August 1940 with the Lysander I
- No. 22 Elementary and Reserve Flying Training School RAF (February 1938 - September 1939) became No. 22 Elementary Flying Training School RAF (September 1939 - May 1947) became No. 22 Reserve Flying School RAF (May 1947 - June 1954)
- A detachment from No. 26 Squadron RAF between 8 June and 3 September 1940 with the Lysander III
- No. 54 Maintenance Unit RAF (October 1940 - March 1945)
- No. 105 Gliding School RAF (May 1945 - September 1955)
- A detachment from No. 239 Squadron RAF between 18 September 1940 and 22 January 1941 with the Lysander II
- A detachment from No. 268 Squadron RAF between 30 September 1940 and 1 April 1941 with the Lysander II
- Detachment of Roc Flight RAF (October - November 1940)

=== Development since the 2000s ===
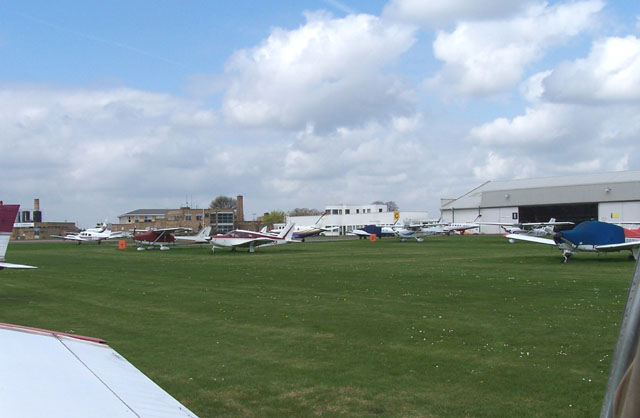
General aviation apron

In 2000, a proposal was created to relocate the airport to a new site away from the city, which would have freed up 500 acres (200 ha) of land for the building of several thousand new homes. A study for a new airport was undertaken by Cambridgeshire County Council and planning permission was requested but withdrawn. In April 2010 Marshall Aerospace again announced it would not be moving from Cambridge Airport to make way for new housing. RAF Mildenhall, Waterbeach Barracks and RAF Wyton were considered as alternative sites but Marshall concluded there were "no suitable relocation options".

In October 2008, to coincide with the opening of the new Marshall Business Aviation Centre, the airport's name was changed from Cambridge City Airport to Marshall Airport Cambridge UK. The name was changed again to Cambridge Airport in 2011 as plans were announced for an expansion of the airport following the installation of instrument landing systems and new hangars.

In 2012, the airport introduced charter flights to Italy as well as regular flights to the Channel Islands. These were the first scheduled flights from the airport since 2006. In mid 2013 the airport completed a £1m refurbishment of its passenger terminal to handle new international airline services and in March 2015 British Airways commenced daily scheduled services to Gothenburg operated by franchise Sun-Air of Scandinavia. Using 32 seat Dornier 328JET aircraft, to begin with 20 seats were reserved by AstraZeneca in order to connect its two main European offices.

Passenger services were reported as "to end on 31 January 2016", although British Airways/Sun-Air continued temporarily to operate flights from Cambridge to Gothenburg. Since 24 March 2016 tickets have not been available to the general public. As of November 2017 the flights now originate in Manchester with a brief stop in Cambridge.

In November 2019, the local FBO changed hands from ExecuJet to Cambridge Jet Centre which is managed by the Airport directly.

=== Prospective closure ===
In May 2019, Marshall Aerospace and Defence Group, owners of the airport, announced that the airport would be closed to all traffic by 2030 at the latest. The Group plans to redevelop the airport site for around 12,000 homes and 5 million sq ft (0.46 million m^{2}) of business premises. As of May 2019, the Group was deciding between three potential airfields for its continuing operations: Duxford and Wyton in Cambridgeshire, and Cranfield in Bedfordshire. In January 2020, the Group ruled out moving to Duxford due to incompatibility between the defence requirements of the Group and the requirements of the local traffic. On 6 October 2020, Cranfield University and MADG announced that they had signed an option agreement for the potential relocation of Marshall Aerospace and Defence Group (MADG) to Cranfield Airport. A spokesperson for MADG cautioned that "the signing of the option agreement does not represent a final decision".

In June 2026, Homes England and The Hill Group completed the acquisition of the Cambridge East site, including Cambridge City Airport and surrounding land, from Marshall Group. The proposed redevelopment is expected to deliver more than 10,000 homes, at least 3 million sq ft of commercial space and around 9,000 jobs. Plans also include supporting infrastructure, public green space, community facilities, schools and healthcare provision, as well as a possible Cambridge East railway station linked to East West Rail. Marshall Group is expected to lease back the airport site until 2029, when its airport operations are planned to relocate away from Cambridge.

== See also ==
- List of airports in the United Kingdom
- Oxford-Cambridge Arc
- Transport in East Anglia
- Suckling Airways
