= Newmarket Road, Cambridge =

Road in the east of Cambridge, England

Newmarket Road
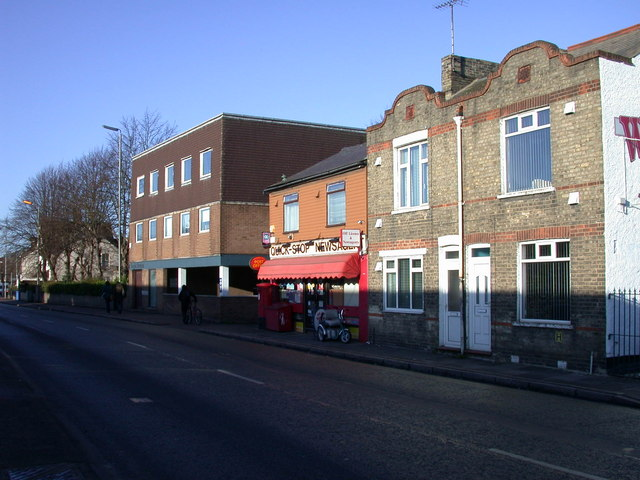
- On the dual carriageway section leading out of the city
- Interactive map of Newmarket Road
- Length: 5.5 mi (8.9 km)
- Postal code: CB5
- Coordinates: 52.21348°N 0.15371°E
- West end: Maids Causeway
- Major junctions: A603 A1134; A14

- East end: A1304

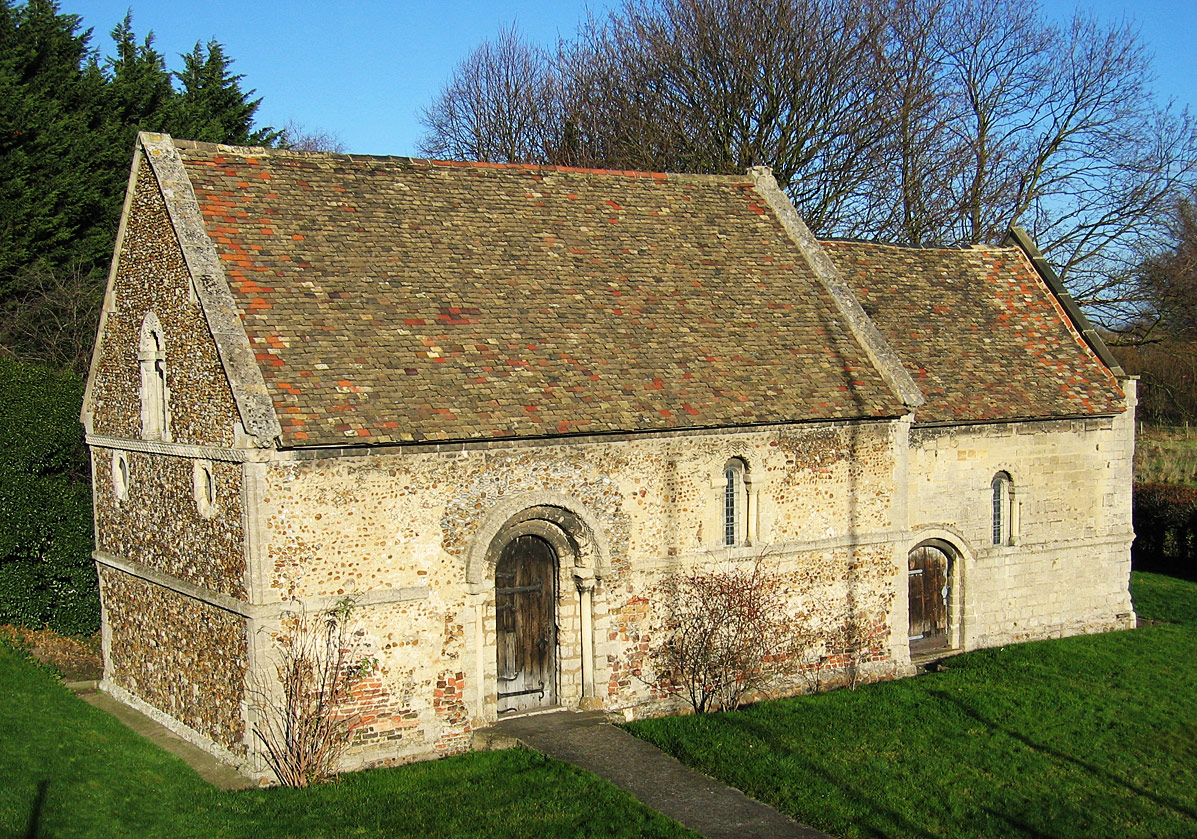
The Leper Chapel, dating from 1125, north of Newmarket Road.

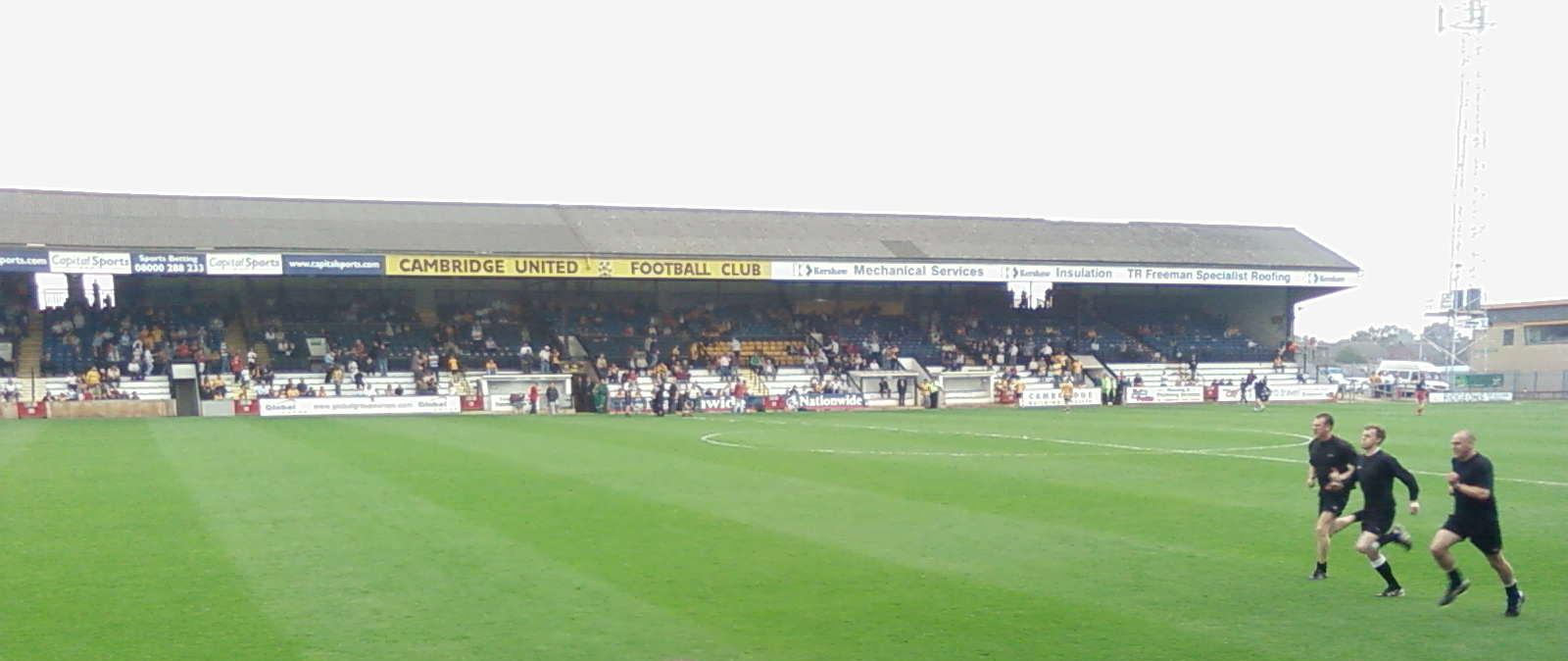
The Abbey Stadium, south of Newmarket Road.

Newmarket Road is an arterial road in the east of Cambridge, England. It is designated the A1134 at the western end, linked by a roundabout forming a junction with Barnwell Road (A1134) to the south. The eastern end links with the city's inner ring road at another roundabout, with Elizabeth Way (A1134) to the north and East Road (A603) to the southeast. Newmarket Road continues a short way towards the city centre, becoming Maid's Causeway and then Jesus Lane. To the east, the road becomes the A1303 and crosses the A14 at a major roundabout, continuing further east and parallel to the A14 out of the city. The road is named after the market town of Newmarket in Suffolk, east of Cambridge.

The Abbey Stadium, home of Cambridge United Football Club is to the south of the road. The section at the north end of the stadium next to the road is known as the Newmarket Road End. The historic Leper Chapel of St Mary Magdalene is also close to the road, where it crosses the Fen Line railway. Dating from 1125, it is probably the oldest surviving building in Cambridge. The Cambridge City Cemetery is off the road to the north. There is a brick-built cemetery chapel.

On the edge of the city south of Newmarket Road and west of the village of Teversham is Cambridge Airport. The main building was designed by the architect Harold Tomlinson and constructed 1936–37.

The road includes large out-of-town stores such as B&Q, which forms part of more than 740,000 square feet (69,000 m^{2}) of retail space. There are also a number of car showrooms.
