= Traprain Law =

Hill in East Lothian, Scotland

Coordinates: 55°57′47″N 2°40′21″W

An aerial view of Traprain Law

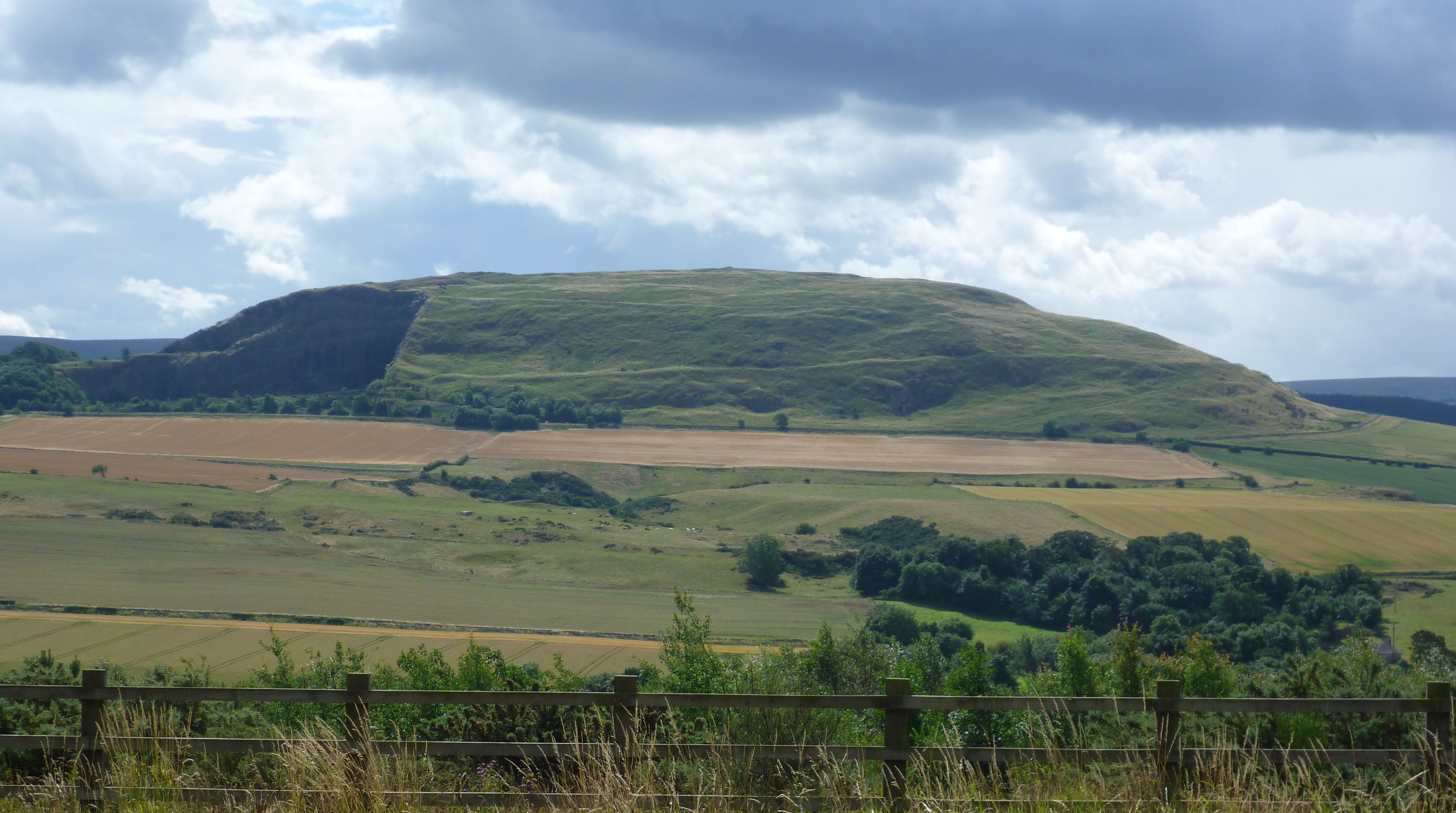
Traprain Law from the north

Traprain Law is a hill 6 km (4 mi) east of Haddington, East Lothian, Scotland. It is the site of a hill fort or possibly oppidum, which covered at its maximum extent about 16 ha (40 acres). It is the site of the Traprain Law Treasure, the largest Roman silver hoard from anywhere outside the Roman Empire which included exquisite silver artefacts.

The hill, about 220 m (720 ft) above MSL, was already a place of burial by around 1500 BC, and showed evidence of occupation and signs of ramparts after 1000 BC. The ramparts were rebuilt and realigned many times in the following centuries. Excavations have shown it was occupied in the Late Iron Age from about AD 40 until the last quarter of the 2nd century (about the time that the Antonine Wall was manned).

In the 1st century AD the Romans recorded the Votadini as a British tribe in the area, and Traprain Law is generally thought to have been one of their major settlements, named Curia by Ptolemy. They emerged as a kingdom under the Brythonic version of their name Gododdin and Traprain Law is thought to have been their capital before moving to Din Eidyn (Castle Rock in modern Edinburgh).

In 1938 an area of the hill was leased to the district council for use as a quarry for road stone, causing substantial disfigurement to the landscape.

== Name history ==
This hill was only known as Traprain Law from the late 18th century, taking its name from a local hamlet. This is etymologically a Cumbric name cognate with Welsh tref 'farm' and either pren 'tree' or bryn 'hill'. Law comes from the Old English word hlāw, meaning a hill.

Before that, it is found on old maps as Dunpendyrlaw. This name appears on a map printed in 1630. An alternative spelling 'Dounprenderlaw' was used in 1547, when a signal beacon was placed on the hill to warn of an English invasion.

Locally, and particularly amongst fishermen who use it as a landmark, it is still referred to as Dunpelder. This name seems also to be etymologically Cumbric, cognate with Welsh din 'fort' and pelydr 'spear shafts', thus meaning 'fort of the spear shafts'. Dun may also be derived from the Scottish Gaelic word dùn meaning 'fort'. It is as 'Dunpeldyr', the capital of King Lot of Lothian, that Traprain Law appears in Mary Stewart's Merlin Trilogy.

== Archaeology ==
A team led by Curle and Cree began the first excavations in 1914 and continued them until 1923, finding layers of fragmentary stone and timber houses under the turf.

=== Traprain Law Treasure ===
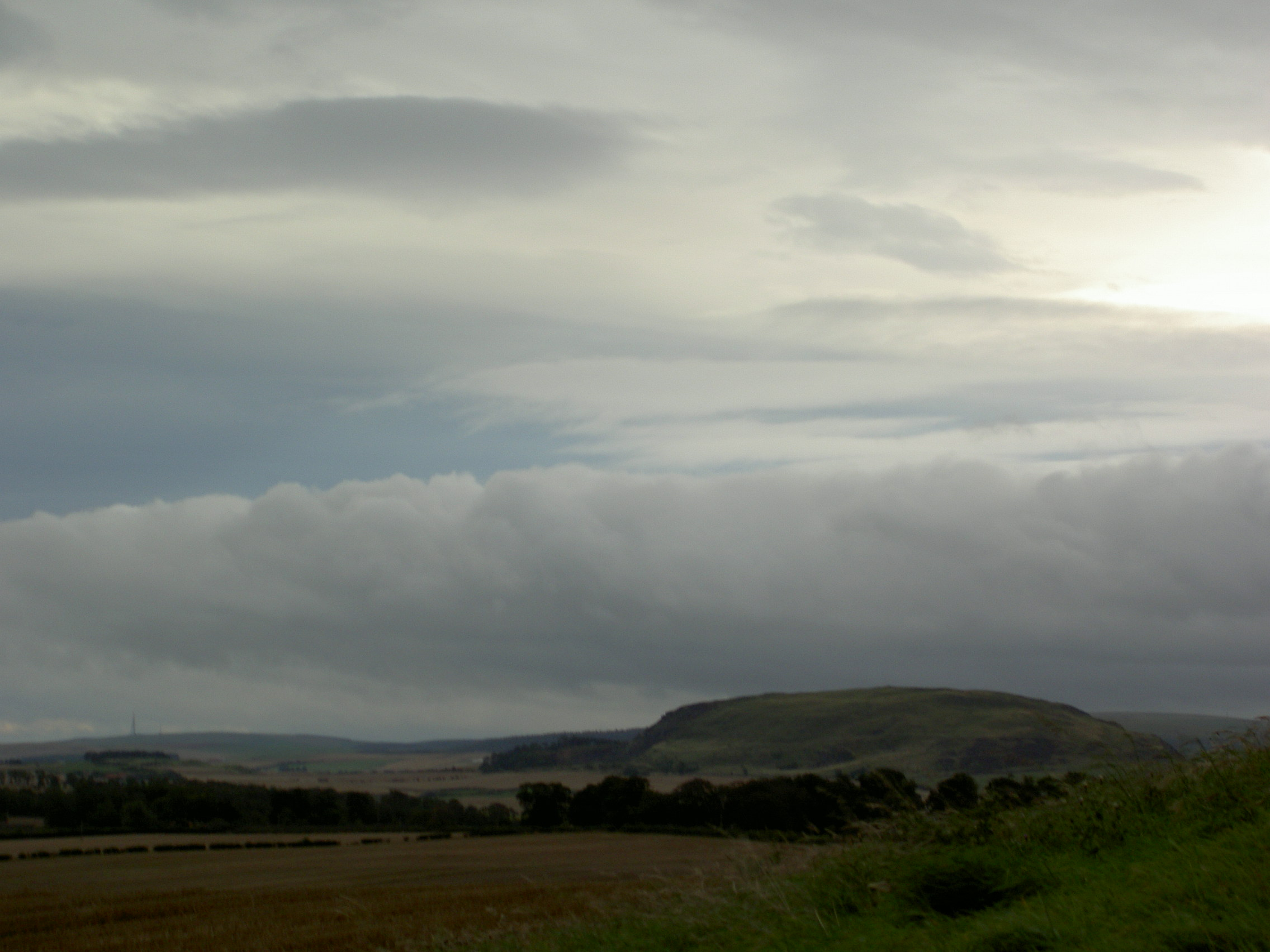
Traprain law from the Garleton hills

In 1919, Alexander Ormiston Curle recovered a hoard of silver plate. The hoard is known as the Traprain Treasure, or Traprain Law Treasure. Consisting of over 24 kg (53 lb) of sliced-up Roman-era silver, the discovery was made in a pit within the boundary of the settlement earlier uncovered. Four Gallic coins were discovered with the hoard; one of the emperor Valens (reigned 364–378), three of Arcadius (reigned 383–408) and one of Honorius (reigned 393–423), which dates the find to some point in the fifth century AD after the Romans had left Britain. The quality of some of the items suggests that they may have come from as far afield as Rome, Ravenna, or possibly Antioch or Constantinople.

Most objects had been crushed and hacked to pieces, and only some were left intact. A great deal of the find was table silver, but there were also early Christian items and remnants from a Roman officer's uniform.

It had originally been thought that the objects had been brought back from a raid abroad, as the objects had been split up ready for division. Later finds such as the Mildenhall Treasure found at Mildenhall, Suffolk and the Hoxne Hoard from Suffolk, showed that silverware of this nature was certainly in use in Roman Britain. A further suggestion is that it had been brought back on a raid by the Votadini across Hadrian's Wall. Furthermore, it has been suggested that the silver was in payment for mercenary service to protect weaker tribes from the inroads of the Scots, Picts, and Angles, the silver being split up as bullion due to lack of adequate coinage.

Further excavations were made in 1939 by Cruden and in 1947 by Bersu.

The collection was restored where appropriate and sent to the National Museum of Antiquities in Edinburgh and now is in the care of the National Museum of Scotland.

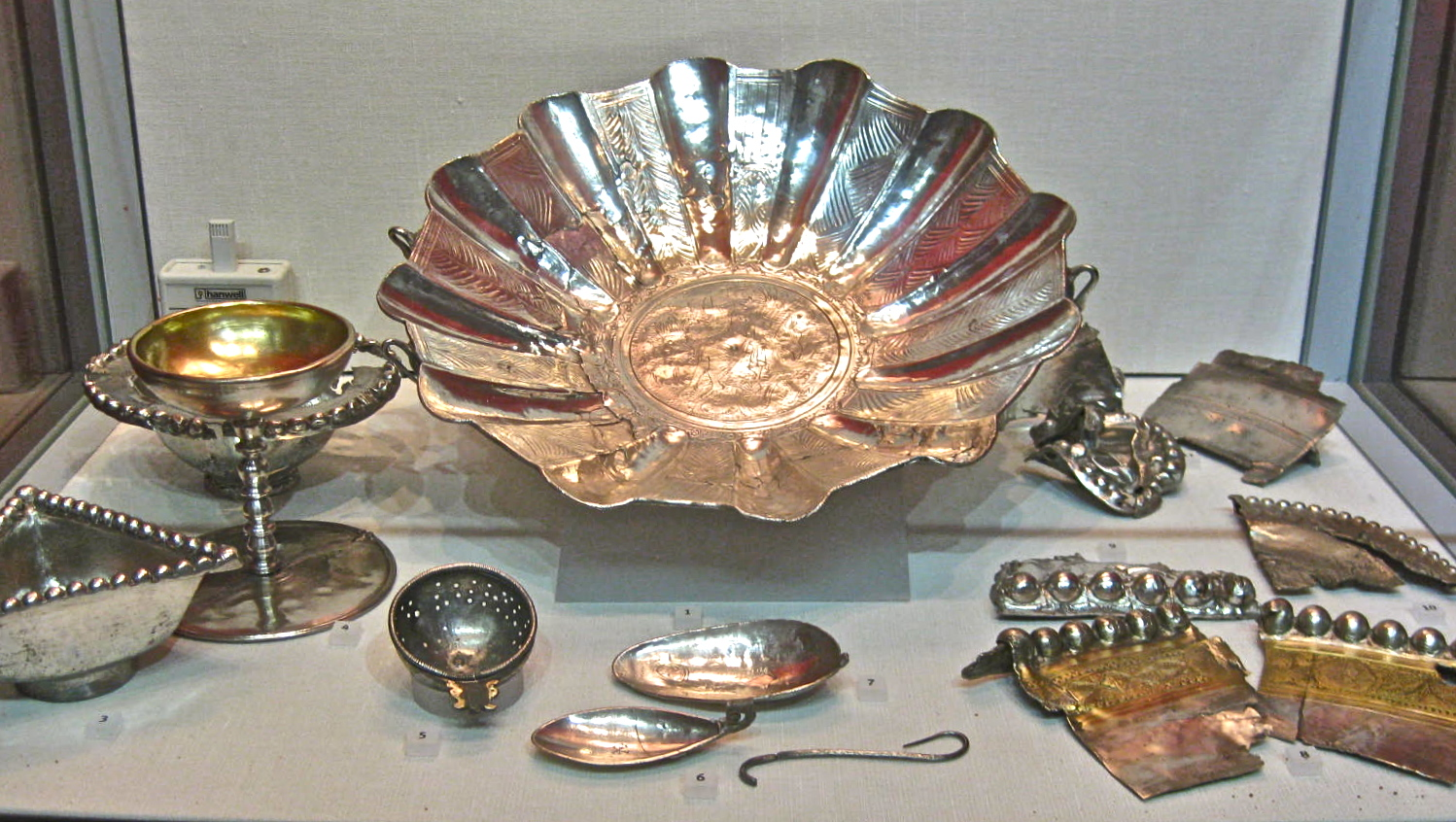
Silver from the Traprain Law Treasure, East Lothian, Scotland

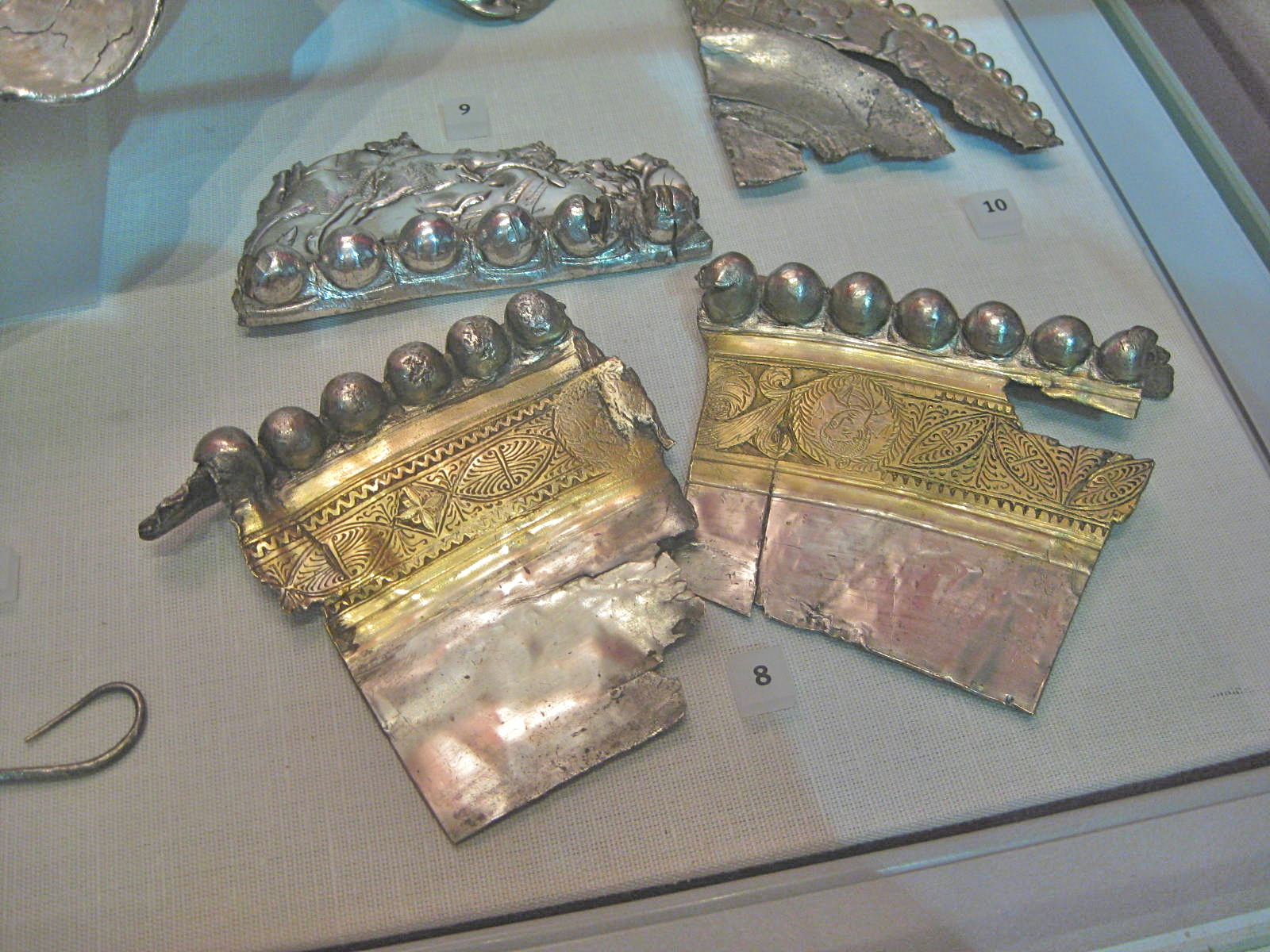
Fragments of Hacksilver

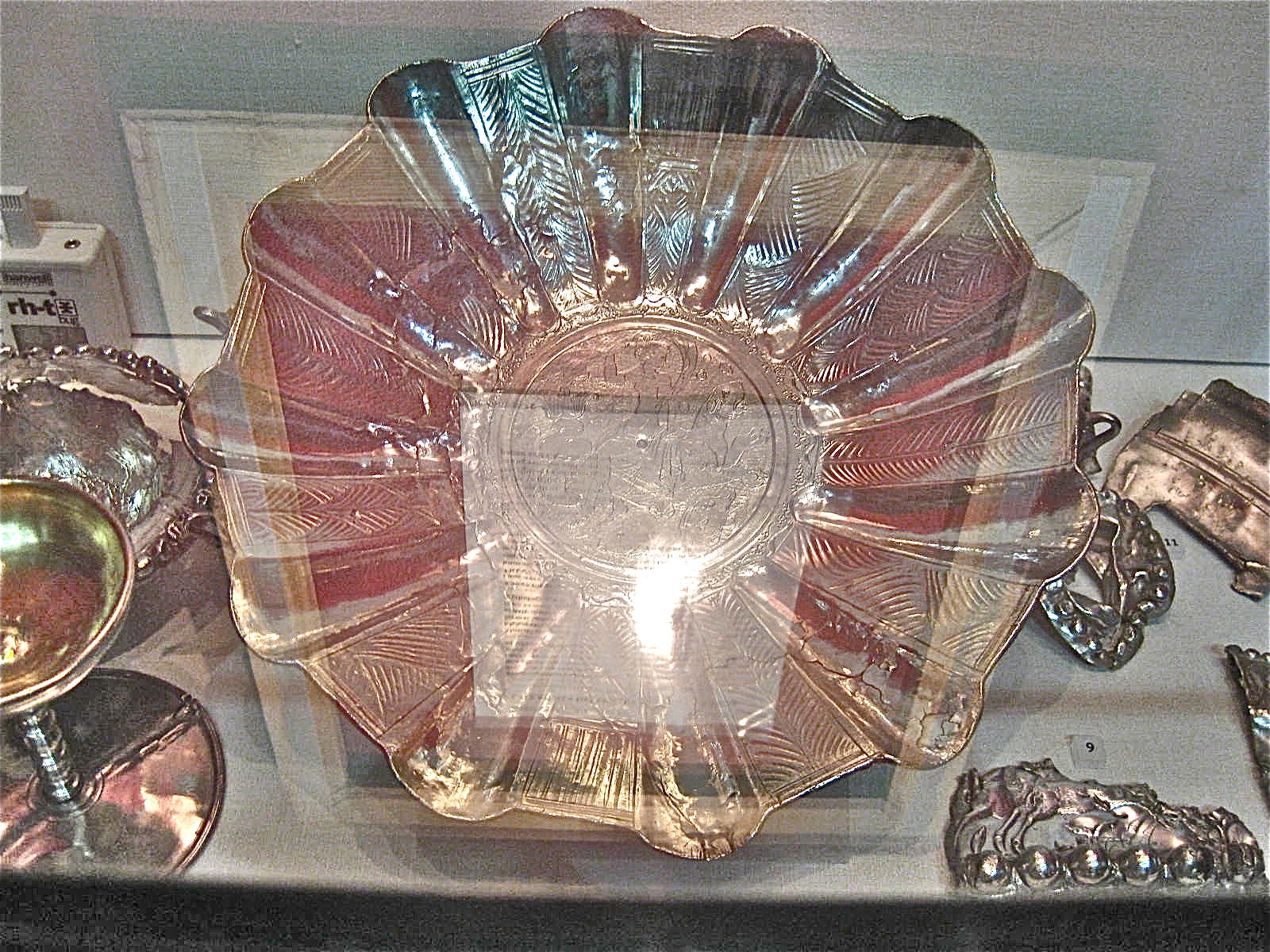
Silver bowl

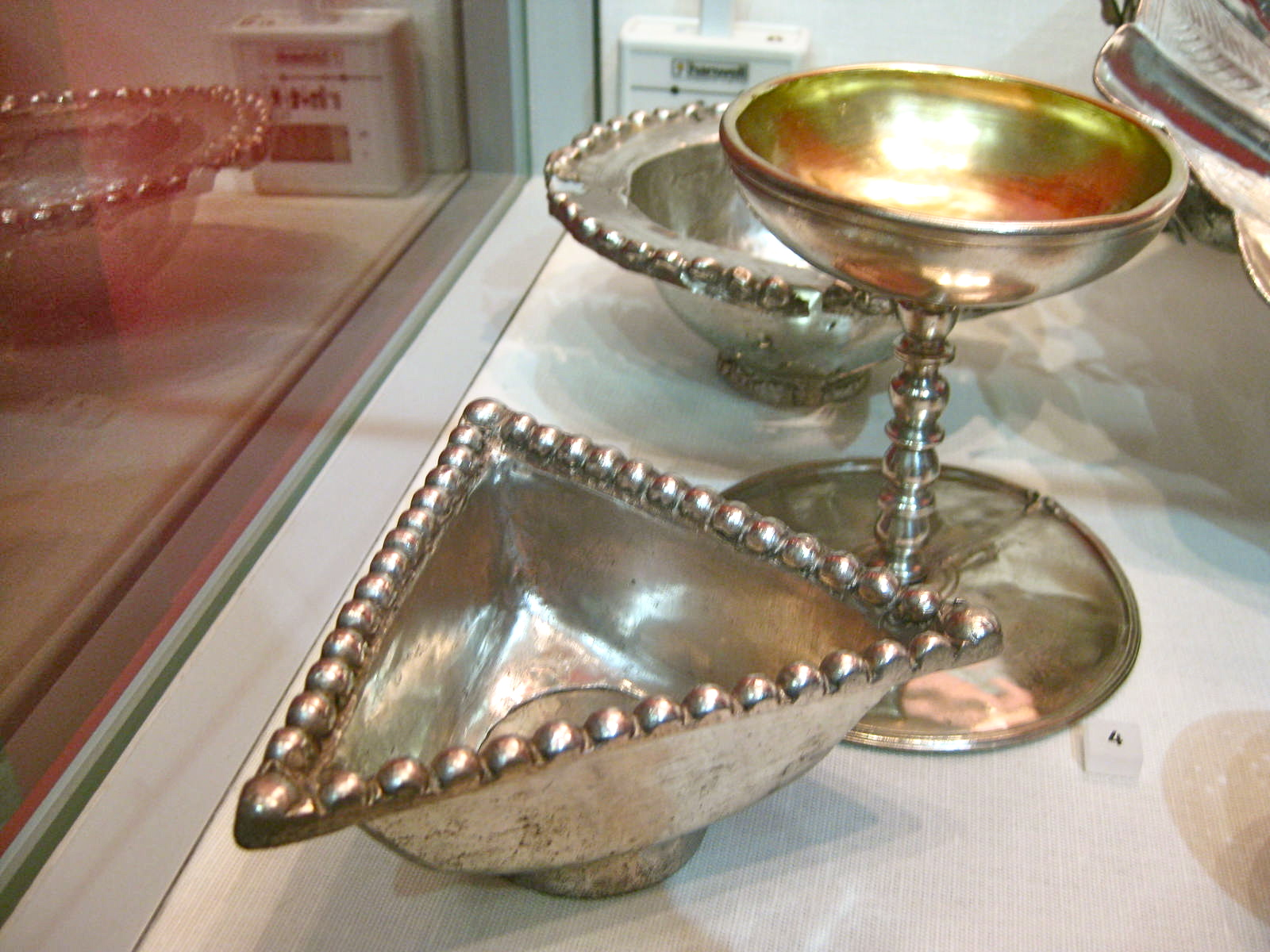
Traprain Law Treasure. Triangular silver dish, drinking cup and bowl.

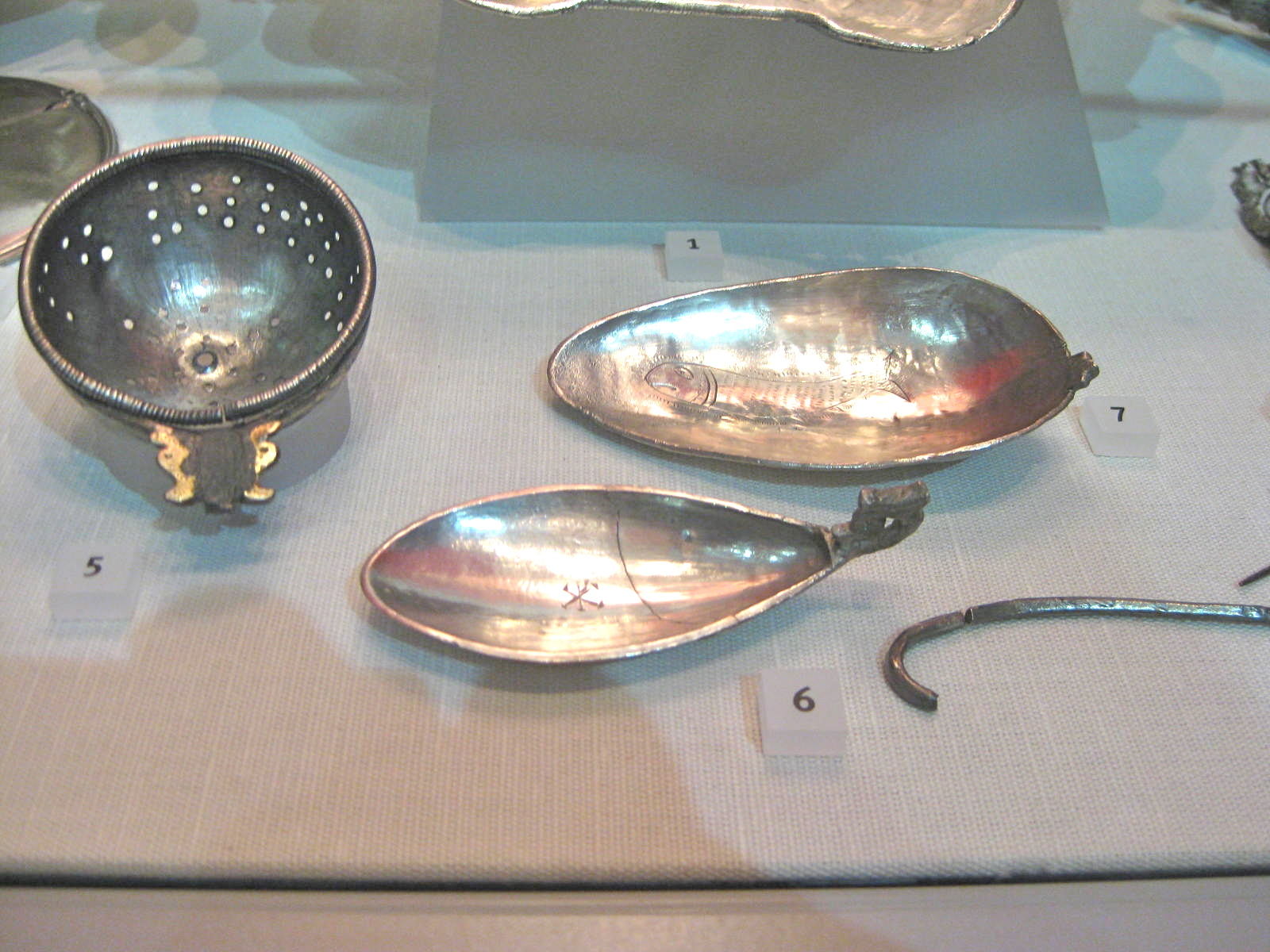
Traprain Law Treasure. Silver strainer and bowls of silver spoons.

== Folklore ==
In legend, Traprain Law was the cliff from which Thenaw, the mother of Saint Mungo, was thrown when her father, King Lot or Leudonus, discovered she was pregnant by Owain mab Urien. Saved by divine providence, she was transported by boat to Saint Serf's community in Culross, where she gave birth to Kentigern, later also known as Mungo.

== Geodesy ==
Up to 1891 Traprain Law was the origin (meridian) of the 6-inch and 1:2500 Ordnance Survey maps of East Lothian. After that year the East Lothian maps were drawn according to the meridian of The Buck in Aberdeenshire.

== Geology ==
Traprain Law, together with nearby Berwick Law and Bass Rock, is an example of the unusual rock type Phonolite. It was intruded around 350 million years ago as a laccolith into sandstones, siltstones and dolomitic limestones of the Ballagan Formation of the Carboniferous period. During quarrying, large xenoliths of sandstone and shale have been found and recorded in detail. Detailed optical and chemical analysis have revealed the presence of small quantities of Sodalite, Olivine and Apatite.

== See also ==
- King Lot
- White Castle, East Lothian
- Chesters Hill Fort
- List of places in East Lothian
- Hillfort

== Photo gallery ==
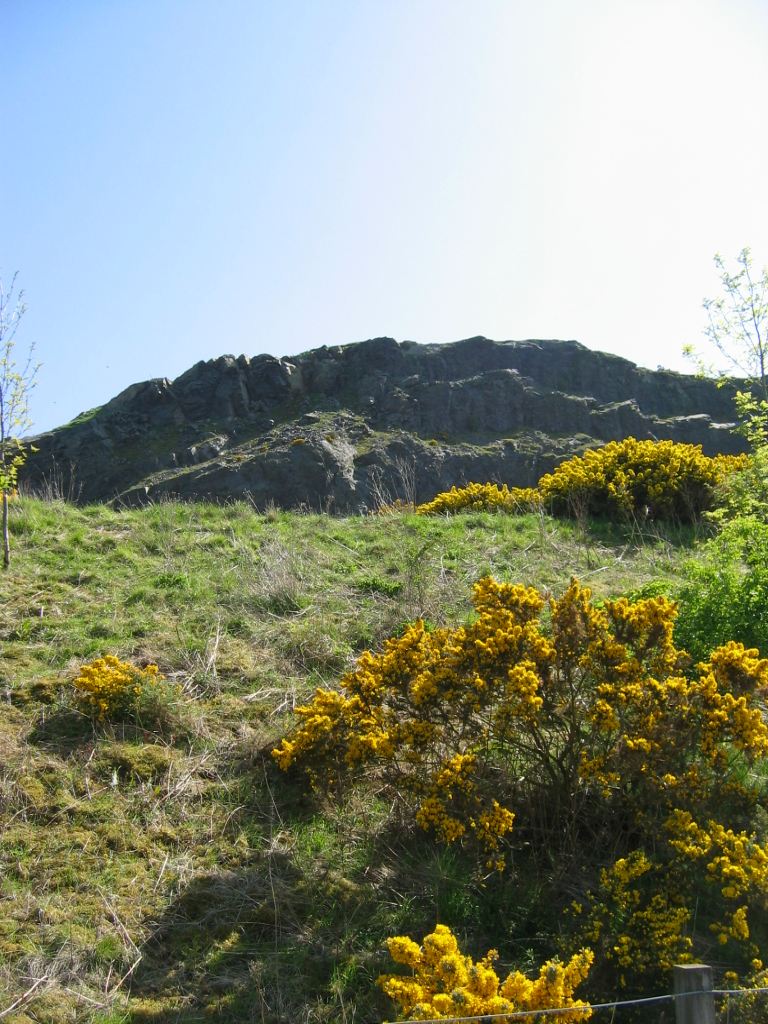

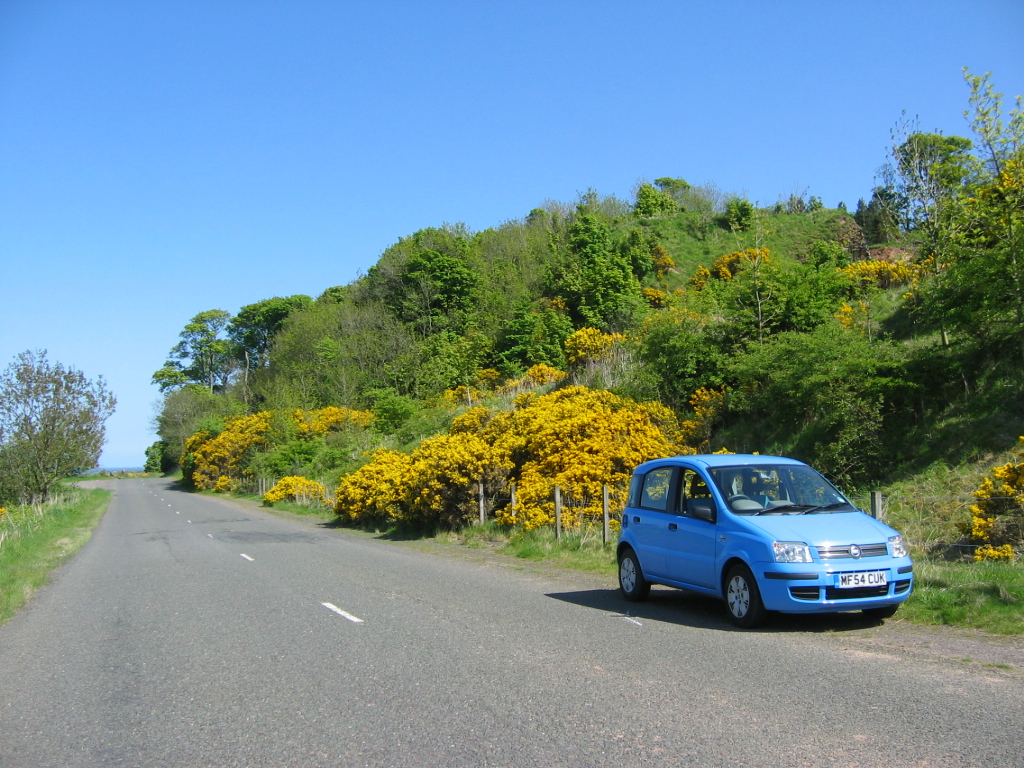

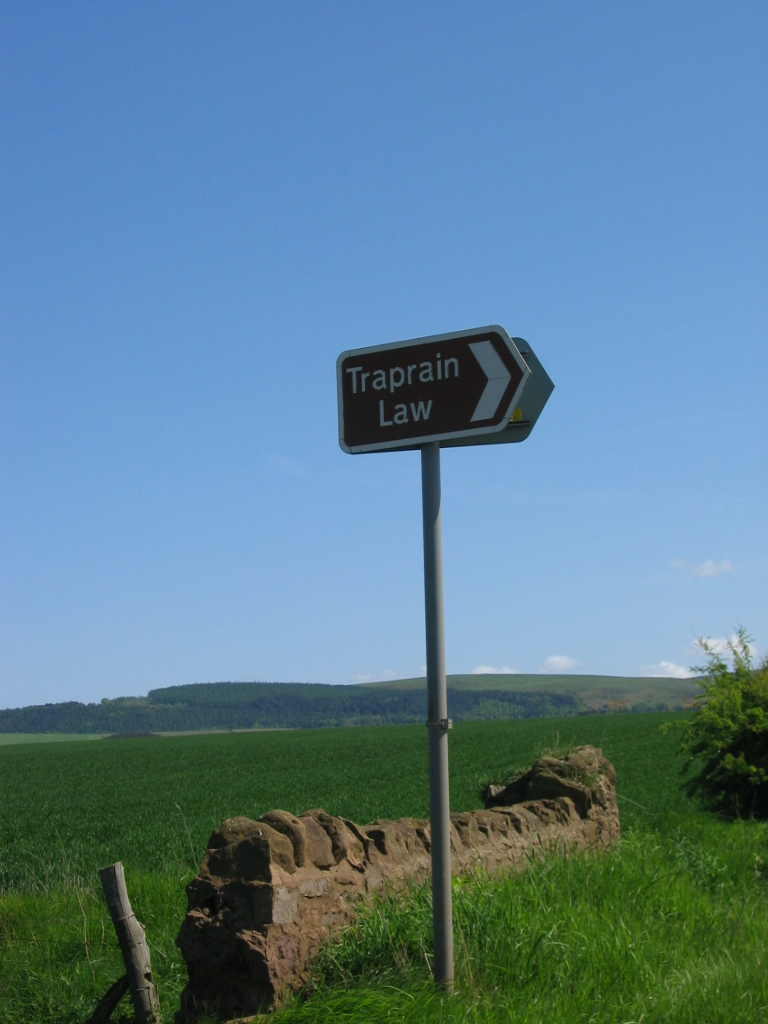

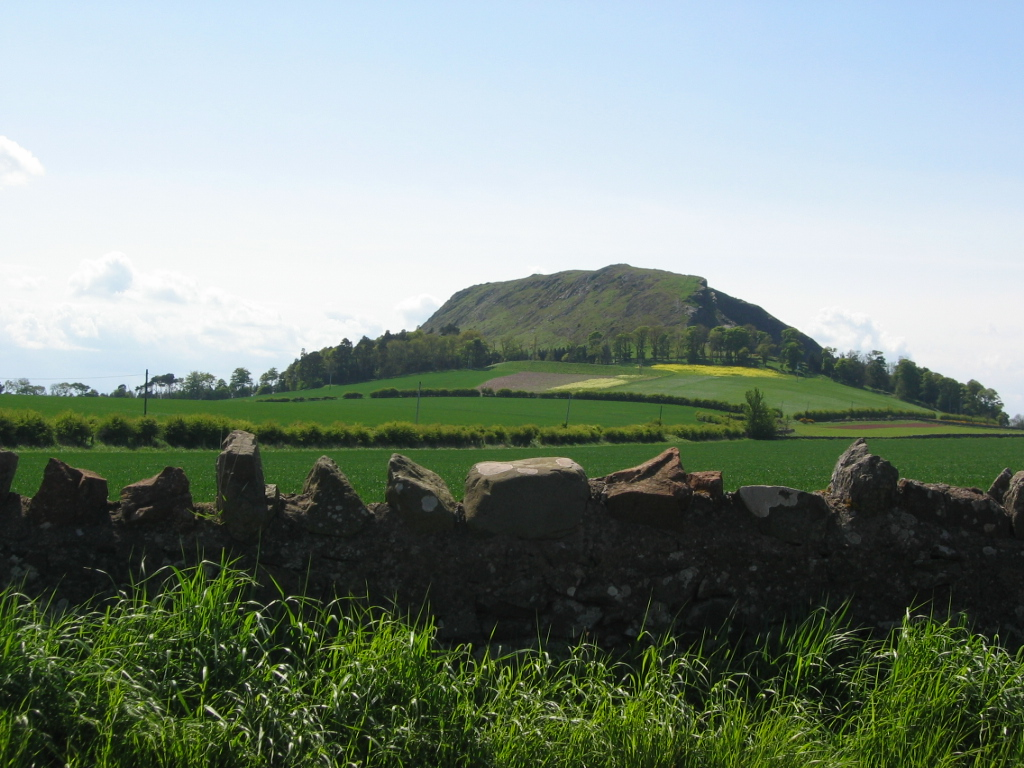
