= Wamil Way =

Cricket ground in Mildenhall, Suffolk

Coordinates: 52°20′27″N 0°30′16″E

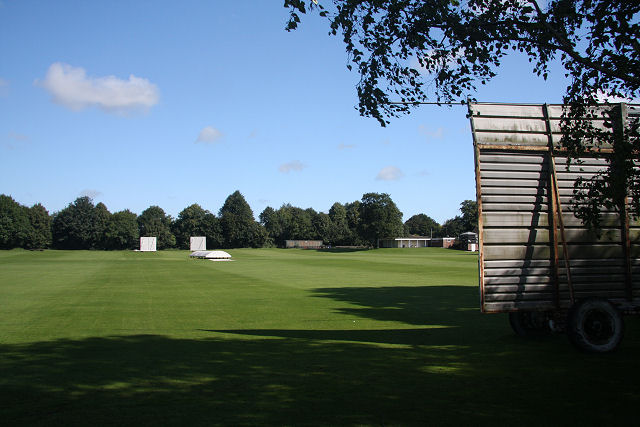

Ground information
- Location: Mildenhall, Suffolk
- Establishment: 1976 (first recorded match)

Team information
Suffolk	(1977-present)
- As of 12 August 2010; Source: Ground profile

Wamil Way is a cricket ground in Mildenhall, Suffolk with two cricket fields, in a picturesque setting beside the River Lark. The first recorded match on the ground was in 1976, when Suffolk played Huntingdonshire. The ground hosted its first Minor Counties Championship match in the same year when Suffolk played Norfolk. From 1977 to present, the ground has hosted 30 Minor Counties Championship matches and 2 MCCA Knockout Trophy matches.

The ground has also hosted List-A matches. The first List-A match played on the ground was between Suffolk and the Lancashire Cricket Board in the 2000 NatWest Trophy. The ground has hosted 2 further List-A matches involving Suffolk, against the Essex Cricket Board in the 2nd round of the 2001 Cheltenham & Gloucester Trophy and against Nottinghamshire in the 3rd round of the same competition.

In local domestic cricket, the ground is the home of Mildenhall Cricket Club who play in the East Anglian Premier Cricket League.
