= Multibrands International =

Multibrands International Ltd.
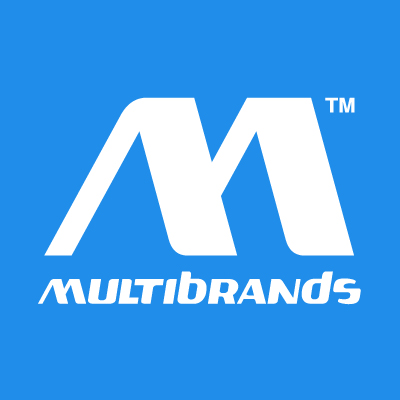
- Company type: Private
- Industry: Fast-moving consumer goods
- Founded: 1998; 27 years ago
- Headquarters: Mildenhall, Suffolk, United Kingdom
- Area served: Worldwide
- Website: www.multibrands.eu.com

Multibrands International is a multinational fast-moving consumer goods company headquartered in Mildenhall, Suffolk. Founded in 1998, it manufactures home-care and personal-care products, beverages, and high-performance LED bulbs.
