= Mildenhall Cricket Club =

Mildenhall Cricket Club in Suffolk was established in 1876 and plays at Wamil Way, a riverside setting with two cricket fields, where the club also grows its own willow trees for bat making.

In 2016 the club's 1XI won the Two Counties Cricket Championship (Suffolk and Essex) and was promoted to the East Anglian Premier Cricket League. The club's first team competes on Saturdays in the East Anglian Premier Cricket League and the second, third, fourth and fifth teams play in the Two Counties Cricket Championship. The club also has a teams playing in the Hunts County Bats Suffolk Cricket league on Sundays, a youth section with players as young as four and runs a thriving ladies' team.

Notable players have included England internationals Tymal Mills and Tom Westley, Essex Women's Lilly Reynolds, and Suffolk's Andrew Squire. Overseas players have included West Indian international Tino Best, South African Tyron Koen and Indian Ankit Sharma.
