= Andrew Squire =

Andrew Squire may refer to:

- Andrew Squire (cricketer)
- Andrew Squire (bowls)
