= Tom Westley =

English cricketer

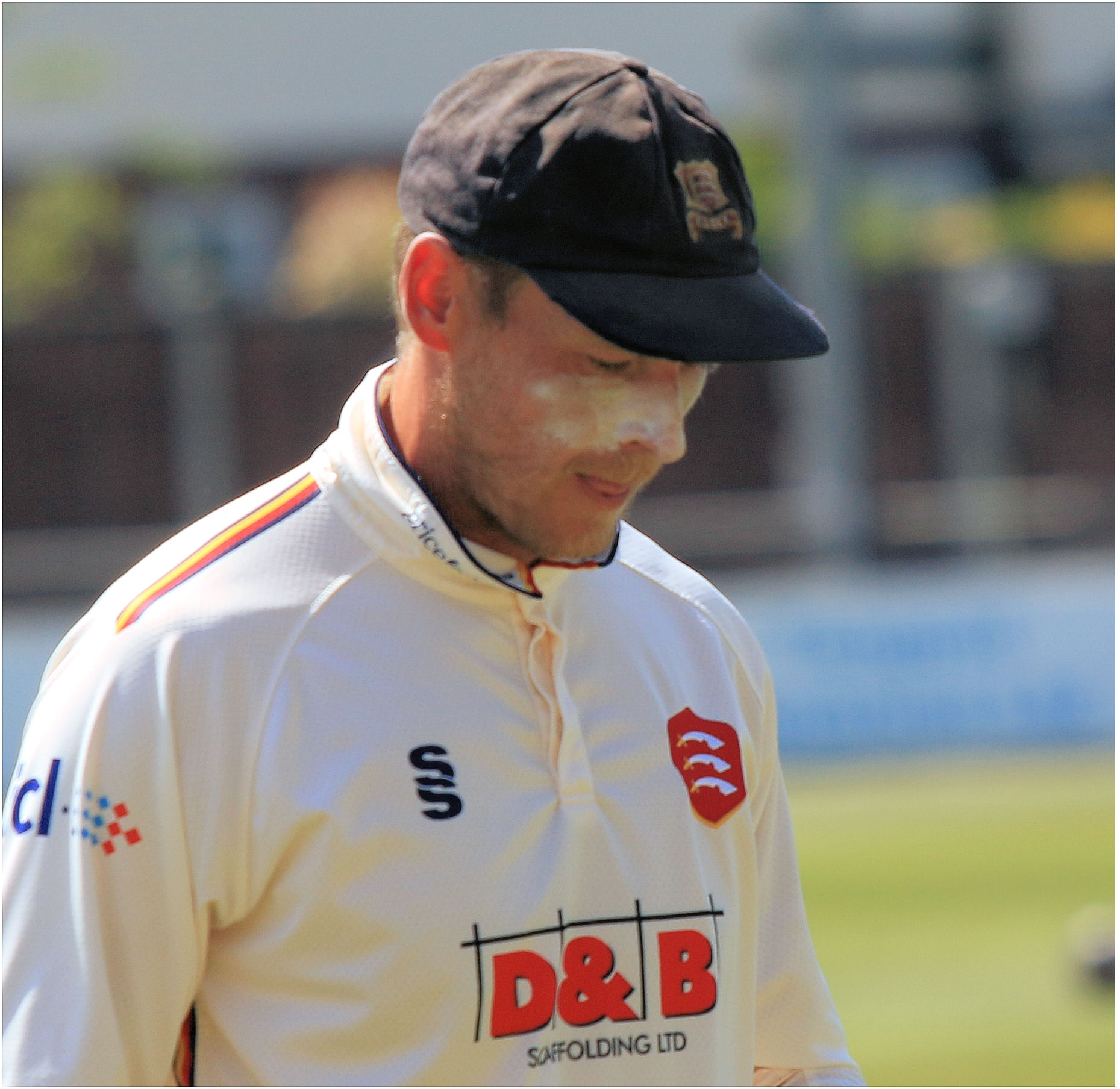
- Westley in 2025

Personal information
- Full name: Thomas Westley
- Born: 13 March 1989 (age 37); Cambridge, Cambridgeshire, England
- Height: 6 ft 2 in (1.88 m)
- Batting: Right-handed
- Bowling: Right-arm off break
- Role: Batsman

International information
- National side: England
- Test debut (cap 679): 27 July 2017 v South Africa
- Last Test: 7 September 2017 v West Indies

Domestic team information
- Years: Team
- 2007–present: Essex (squad no. 21)
- 2014/15: Bloomfield

Career statistics
Competition	Test	FC	LA	T20
Matches	5	266	135	111
Runs scored	193	14,781	4,950	2,569
Batting average	24.12	35.87	40.57	29.19
100s/50s	0/1	33/64	11/36	2/10
Top score	59	254	141	109*
Balls bowled	24	5,543	2,222	246
Wickets	0	63	50	8
Bowling average	–	45.73	37.30	38.75
5 wickets in innings	–	0	0	0
10 wickets in match	–	0	0	0
Best bowling	–	4/55	4/60	2/27
Catches/stumpings	1/–	148/–	39/–	41/–
- Source: ESPNcricinfo, 27 September 2026

Thomas Westley (born 13 March 1989) is an English professional cricketer who has played Test cricket for the England cricket team. He is a top order right-handed batsman who occasionally bowls offbreaks and has played first-class cricket for Essex County Cricket Club since 2006. He began his cricket career at Weston Colville Cricket Club in Cambridgeshire.

== Early life and education ==
Westley was born on 13 March 1989 in Cambridge. He was educated at Linton Village College, Hills Road Sixth Form College and studied at Durham University.

== County career ==
Westley's Essex career began in the 2004 Second XI Championship where he played his debut match as a 15-year-old against a Middlesex side captained by then 51-year-old ex-Test cricketer John Emburey. Westley continued to play occasionally throughout 2004 and 2005, also two matches in the Minor Counties Championship for Cambridgeshire in 2005.

2006 saw Westley make his first List A match appearance, against a team of Sri Lankans, as well as gaining a place in the first team for the 2007 season. In September 2009 Westley scored his first century for the first team reaching 132 against Derbyshire.

Westley has also played for MCC and captained the Durham MCC University side in games against county sides and against other university sides. When he is not needed by Essex, he plays in the East Anglian Premier Cricket League for Mildenhall Cricket Club, as well as playing for Radwinter Bowls Club.

== International career ==
After playing for the England Under-19 cricket team, including at the 2008 ICC Under-19 Cricket World Cup in Malaysia, Westley was added to England's Test squad ahead of the third Test against South Africa in July 2017 batting third as a replacement for the injured Gary Ballance. He made his Test debut at The Oval on 27 July 2017, scoring 25 runs in the first innings and 59 in the second, as England won by 239 runs.

Westley was again selected to bat third in the fourth Test and for all three of England's Test matches against the West Indies played in August and September 2017. A series of low scores meant that he dropped out of the side after the end of the 2017 English summer.
