= Mildenhall, Suffolk =

Town in Suffolk, England

Coordinates: 52.34461°N 0.50890°E

Mildenhall
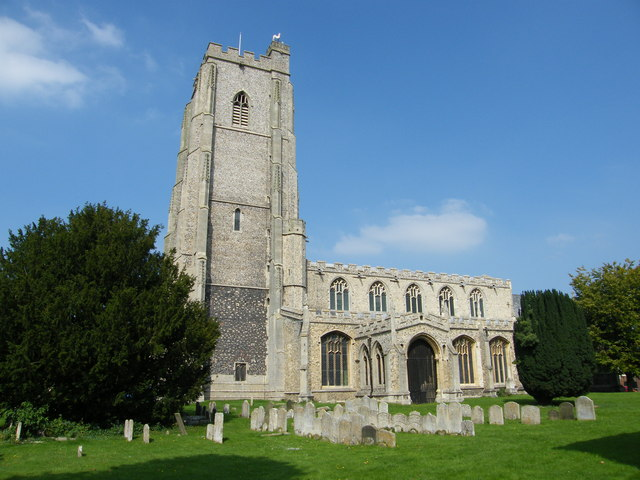
- St Mary's Church

- Location within Suffolk
- Area: 36.03 km^{2} (13.91 sq mi) inc. West Row
- Population: 10,315 (2011) inc. West Row
  - Density: 286/km^{2} (740/sq mi)
- OS grid reference: TL710748
  - London: 75 mi (121 km)
- Civil parish: Mildenhall High
- District: West Suffolk
- Shire county: Suffolk
- Region: East
- Country: England
- Sovereign state: United Kingdom
- Post town: BURY ST EDMUNDS
- Postcode district: IP28
- Dialling code: 01638
- Police: Suffolk
- Fire: Suffolk
- Ambulance: East of England
- UK Parliament: West Suffolk
- Website: www.mildenhall.suffolk.gov.uk

Mildenhall is a market town in the civil parish of Mildenhall High, in the West Suffolk district, in the county of Suffolk, England. The town is near the A11, and is 37 mi (60 km) north-west of Ipswich. The large Royal Air Force station, RAF Mildenhall, as well as RAF Lakenheath, are located north of the town. Both are used by the United States Air Force and Mildenhall is the headquarters of its 100th Air Refueling Wing and 352nd Special Operations Group. Mildenhall is often seen as the start of The Fens on the south/east.

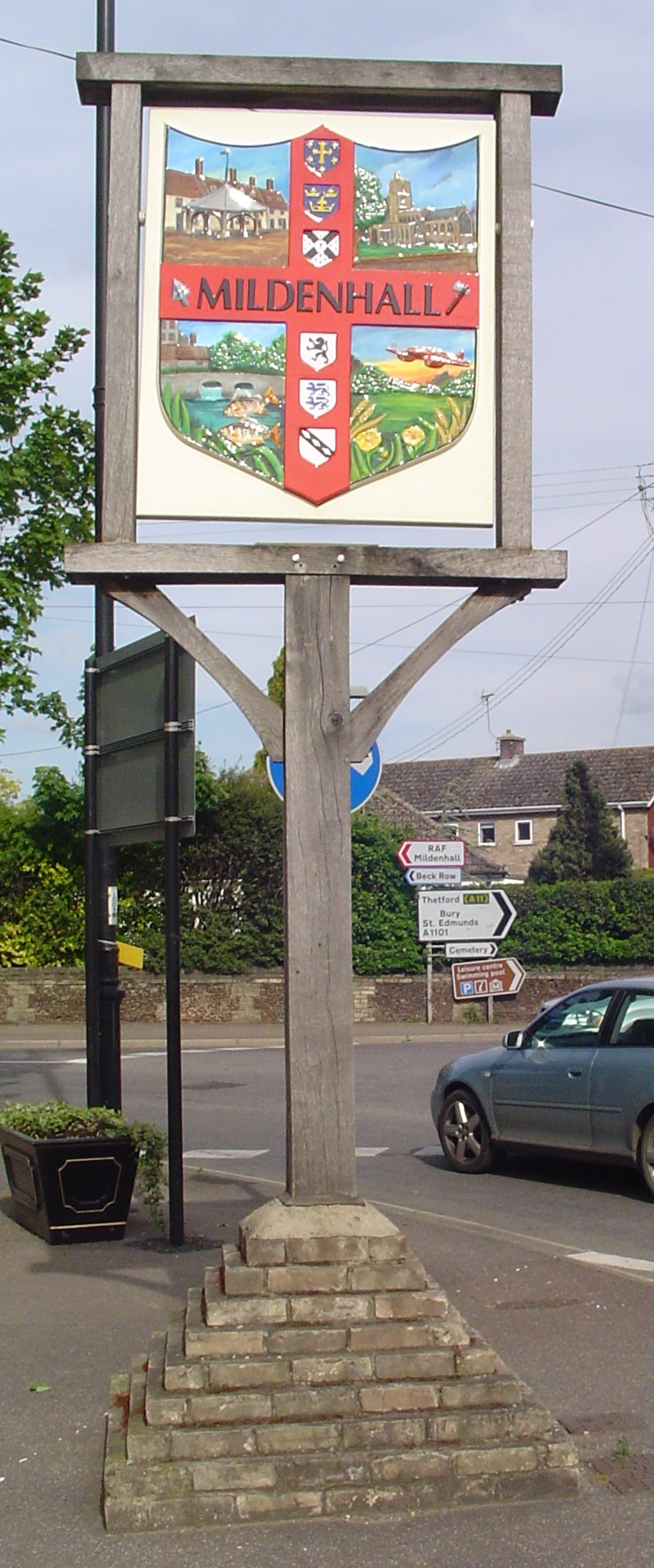
Village sign in Mildenhall

== History ==
=== Early history and archaeology ===
The Mildenhall Treasure was discovered just outside the town in 1942. The treasure is a hoard of Roman silver objects buried in the 4th century. In 1946, the discovery was made public and the treasure acquired by the British Museum, where it is today.

Roald Dahl wrote an article about the find which was published first in the Saturday Evening Post, and later as "The Mildenhall Treasure" (a short story) in his short story collection The Wonderful Story of Henry Sugar and Six More. The Mildenhall Museum in the centre of the town contains displays of local history and wildlife, the history of the RAF base, and information on the Mildenhall Treasure. Entrance is free, opening times vary throughout the year.

The region between Devil's Dyke and the line between Littleport and Shippea Hill shows a remarkable amount of archaeological findings of the Stone Age, the Bronze Age and the Iron Age.

The area around Mildenhall has been settled by humans since at least the Bronze Age. Following the Roman Empire invasion of Britain, Mildenhall was the site of a Roman settlement, which at some point contained the Mildenhall Treasure.

The name of the town was first recorded in 1050 as Mildenhale, believed to mean a nook of land belonging to a woman called "Milde" or a man called "Milda". In 1086, the Domesday Book recorded that the town was the property of the Abbot of St Edmunds and had a population of some 64 families.

=== Early Modern history ===
With the Dissolution of the Monasteries in 1536, ownership of the town was transferred to Edward North, 1st Baron North, whose son, Roger North, lived in Mildenhall for a time. Ownership of the Mildenhall estate remained with the North family for many decades. It was Henry North who, upon retirement, built the Manor house at Mildenhall.

Sir Henry North was elected MP for Suffolk in 1685, but he died a bachelor and so ownership of the estate passed to Sir Thomas Hanmer. Hanmer was elected Speaker of the House of Commons in 1714 and spent little time in his estate. He also died without an heir, and ownership then passed to Thomas Bunbury, who also became MP for Suffolk. In 1810 Joseph Smedley was able to hire a building as a temporary theatre for £2.

=== Modern history ===
The Bunbury family held the manor of Mildenhall until the estate was broken up in 1933. RAF Mildenhall was officially opened in 1934 and served as a base for RAF Bomber Command during the Second World War. In 1950, the US Air Force took over its operation.

On 1 April 2019 the parish of West Row was split from Mildenhall, on 10 October 2023 the parish was renamed from "Mildenhall" to "Mildenhall High".

== The town ==
Mildenhall is centred on a market place with a 16th-century hexagonal market cross and town pump. The town's market is held here every Friday; it originated as a weekly chartered market in (it is believed) the 15th century. In 1934 Mildenhall was the start point of the MacRobertson Air Race to Melbourne, Australia.

The town is the subject and namesake of a song by The Shins, as well as being mentioned in passing in the Pink Floyd song "Let There Be More Light" on the 1968 album A Saucerful of Secrets as a speculated location for first contact between humanity and extraterrestrial life:

Then at last, the mighty ship
Descending on a point of flame
Made contact with the human race at Mildenhall

Due to the airfield, Mildenhall currently has the highest concentration of U.S. citizens in the country. In 2005, as many as 30% of residents were born in the U.S.

== Transport ==
The town has a bus station, which was completed in 2005. Regular bus services run to the neighbouring towns of Brandon, Bury St Edmunds, Newmarket and Thetford. National Express operate daily coach services to Norwich, London (Victoria Coach Station), Heathrow, Gatwick and Stansted Airports. Mildenhall railway station was the terminus of the Cambridge to Mildenhall railway until its closure in 1962.

== Education ==
Mildenhall has two primary schools: St. Mary's and Great Heath and one secondary school: Mildenhall College Academy [formerly Mildenhall Upper School]. The secondary school also contains a sixth form, known as MCA6.

== Sport and leisure ==
Mildenhall has a non-League football club, Mildenhall Town F.C., who play at Recreation Way. Mildenhall currently play in the Isthmian League North after winning the Thurlow Nunn League for a second time in 2023/24 season.

It also has one of the East of England's leading cricket clubs, Mildenhall Cricket Club, playing at Wamil Way. In 2016 the 1st XI won the Two Counties Championship and was promoted to the East Anglian Premier Cricket League. Notable former players include England internationals Tymal Mills and Tom Westley and Essex Women's Lilly Reynolds.

The Mildenhall Cycling Club is next to the cricket ground; previous members include Victoria Pendleton.

A leisure centre is based at Mildenhall Hub and is run by Abbeycroft Leisure. It has a swimming pool, a gym, fitness classes, a sports hall for racquet sports and outdoor pitches for football. There is a parkrun event held every Saturday and a 2km junior parkrun event held every Sunday at the Mildenhall Hub.

The River Lark runs through the town, and there is a 19-acre open space adjoining it, called the Jubilee Fields.

Stock car, Banger racing and Motorcycle Speedway events are held at nearby Mildenhall Stadium.

== Notable people ==
- Henry Bunbury (caricaturist), 1750–1811, British caricaturist.
- Abigail Byrne - football official, attended Mildenhall College Academy.
- Elonka Dunin - resident at RAF Mildenhall during her time in the USAF.
- Lindsey Graham - U.S. senator, resident at RAF Lakenheath during the 1980s when he served in the USAF as a JAG.
- Sir Thomas Hanmer, 4th Baronet - owner of the Mildenhall estate; later MP for Suffolk and Speaker of the House of Commons.
- Nicole Malachowski - resident at RAF Lakenheath during her time as a pilot with the 48th Fighter Wing.
- James Mercer - musician. Lived in Mildenhall from 1985 to 1990 after his father was based at RAF Mildenhall. He wrote a song about his time in Mildenhall which appears on the 2017 album Heartworms.
- Tymal Mills - educated at Mildenhall College Academy and played for Mildenhall Cricket Club.
- Sir Henry North - Member of Parliament for Suffolk.
- Rick Perry - based at RAF Mildenhall when he was a pilot in the USAF.
- Dick Rutan - based at RAF Lakenheath when a pilot in the USAF.
- Edmund Selous - ornithologist and writer, resident in Mildenhall from 1889 to 1920.
- Chesley Sullenberger - based at RAF Lakenheath when he was a pilot in the USAF.
- Phil Thornalley - songwriter and musician, grew up in Worlington.
- Heather Wilson - resident at RAF Mildenhall during her time in the USAF.
