= Mildenhall Treasure =

Roman silver tableware hoard

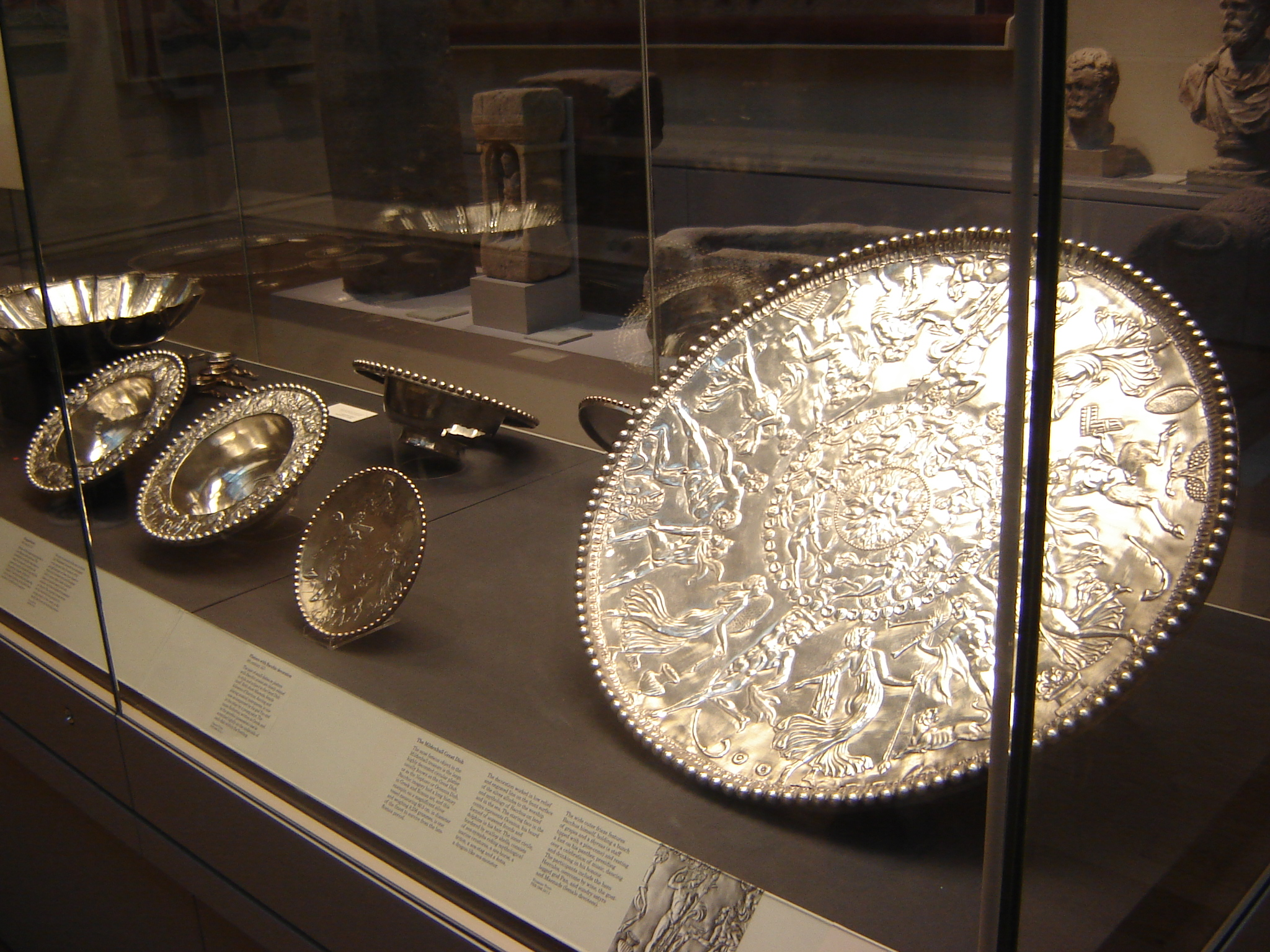
- Mildenhall Treasure in the British Museum
- Material: Silver
- Created: 4th century CE
- Discovered: 1942
- Present location: British Museum

The Mildenhall Treasure is a large hoard of 34 masterpieces of Roman silver tableware from the fourth century CE, and by far the most valuable Roman objects artistically and by weight of bullion in Britain. It was found at West Row, near Mildenhall, Suffolk, in 1942. It consists of over thirty items and includes the Great Dish which weighs over 8 kg (18 lb).

The collection is on view in the British Museum because of its immense importance and value, and replicas are on show in the local museum at Mildenhall.

== History of discovery ==
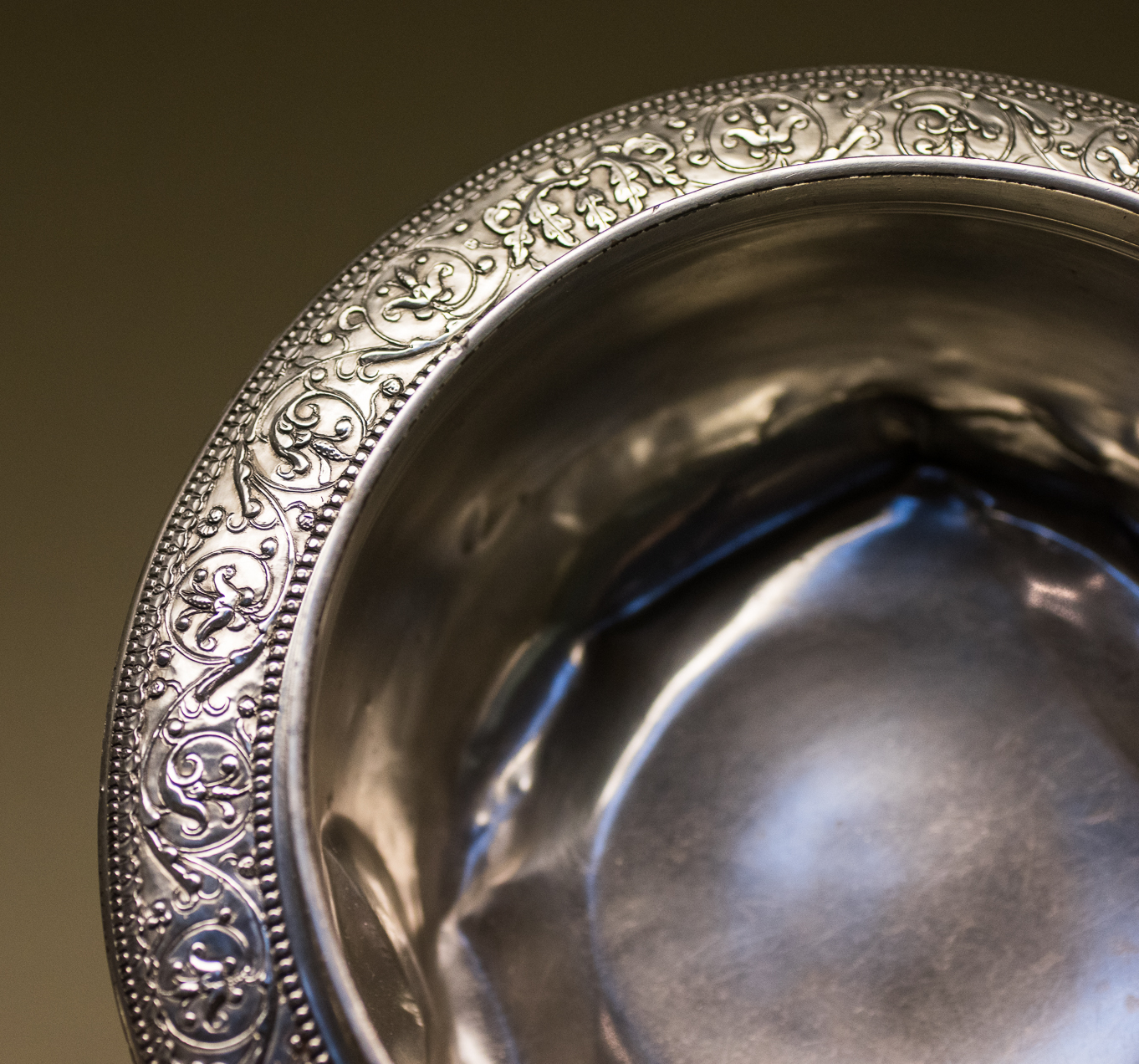
Detail of a bowl

The hoard was discovered while ploughing in January 1942 by Gordon Butcher, who claimed he had removed it from the ground with help from Sydney Ford, for whom he was working at the time. Many details of the discovery remain uncertain, not least because it took place during wartime. They claimed that they did not at first recognise the objects for what they were, although Ford collected ancient objects. Ford cleaned the pieces and displayed them in his house, using some of them as daily utensils and some, such as the Great Dish, on special occasions with the family. Ford had to declare the hoard to the authorities in 1946 after a knowledgeable friend, Dr. Hugh A. Fawcett, had seen them in his home and reported them. An inquest was held that year, when the find was legally declared a "treasure trove" and acquired by the British Museum in London. Academic opinion at the time was generally reluctant to believe that such fine-quality Roman silver could have been used in Roman Britain, and there were many imaginative rumours and even doubts that this was a genuine British find at all. The numerous well-documented discoveries of high-quality Roman material in subsequent decades, including the Hoxne Hoard also found in Suffolk in 1992, have set all such doubts to rest.

In the 1990s, Richard Hobbs drew attention to the importance of the partly fictional account by Roald Dahl, and addressed the issues surrounding the actual finding. In Dahl's version of events, Hobbs believes that Ford was fully aware of the significance of the find, but could not bear to part with the treasure. He kept it and restored it in secret, but two of the spoons left out on display were seen by an unexpected visitor, Dr. Fawcett.

Ford and Butcher were awarded £1000 each as finders, although not necessarily the full ex gratia reward, since the find had not been correctly reported and since most of those involved doubted that Ford and Butcher had given a true account of the finding. The two archaeologists who had represented the British Museum at the inquest – Tom Lethbridge and Major Gordon Fowler – continued to research the finding for some years after 1946, but in the end could only be sure of one thing – that Ford had not told the truth about how and where he had obtained the treasure. In Paul Ashbee’s words, Ford's account was 'patently spurious' and the source of treasure was a case of "ignotum per ignotius".

== History of display and publication ==
The Mildenhall find was placed on show in its entirety in the British Museum as soon as the necessary registration and conservation work had been completed following its acquisition in 1946, and it has remained a permanent feature of the museum's Romano-British gallery ever since, with occasional loans of some pieces to special exhibitions both within the museum and elsewhere.

John W. Brailsford promptly published the first brief, summary catalogue of the find, and successive revised editions of this booklet were published in 1955 and 1964. A somewhat fuller, though still brief, study by Kenneth S. Painter came out in 1977. (Note that the catalogue numbers in Painter 1977, cited in the descriptions below, correspond with the sequence of Museum registration numbers, 1946.10-1.1–34, established in the original curatorial listing of the objects). The most striking object in the treasure, the Great Dish (see below) has been illustrated and mentioned in countless publications, including a major paper on late Roman "picture plates".

A detailed study of the treasure has recently been published by the British Museum.

== The contents of the hoard ==
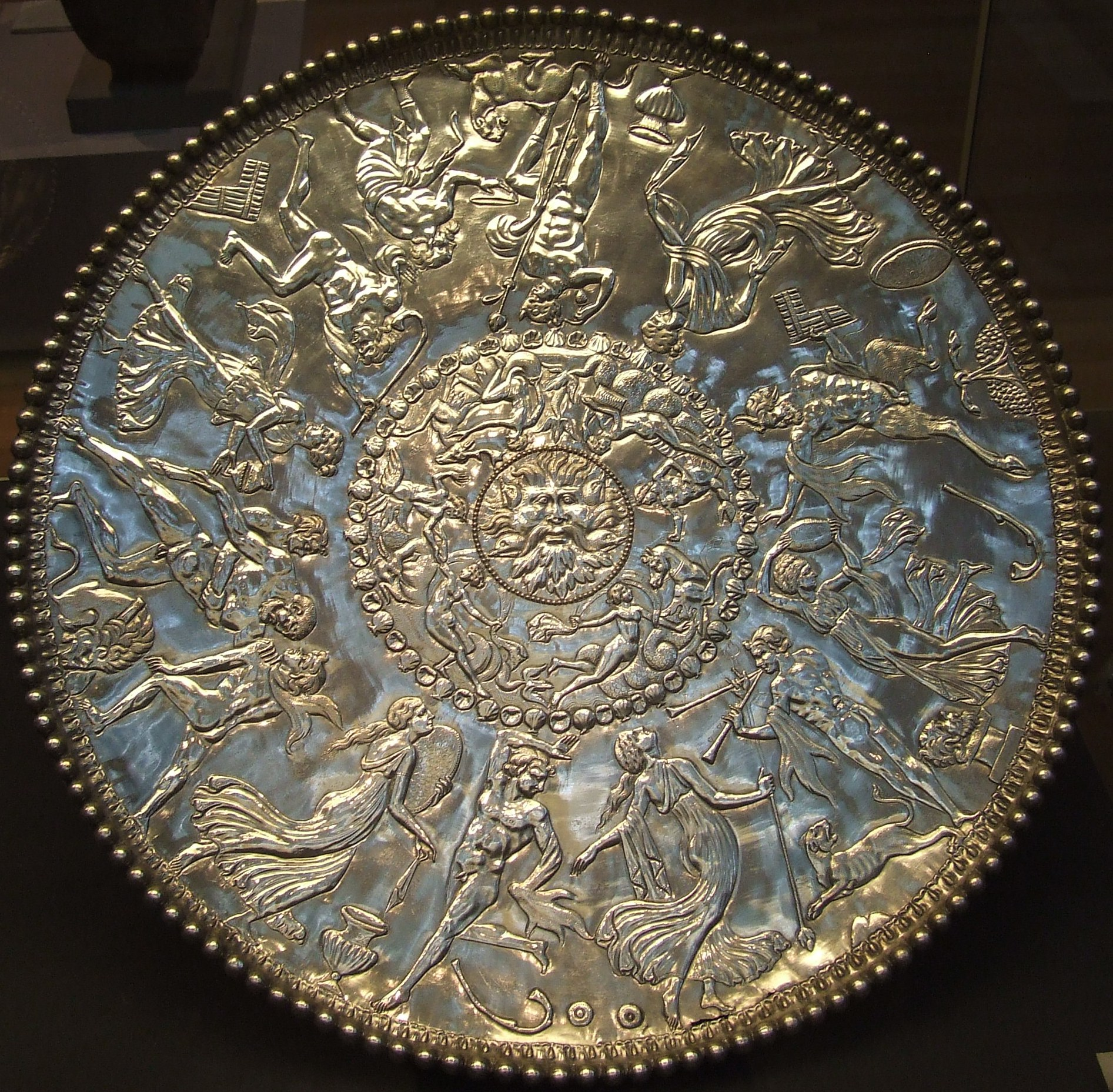
The Great Dish, or Great Plate of Bacchus

The treasure consists of silver tableware of types current in the 4th century, and it was probably concealed at some time in that century. Most of the objects are comparatively large, and all are of very high-quality workmanship.

The hoard consists of two large serving platters, two small decorated serving plates, a deep fluted bowl, a set of four large decorated bowls, two small decorated bowls, two small pedestalled dishes, a deep flanged bowl with a deep, domed cover, five small round ladles with dolphin-shaped handles, and eight long-handled spoons (cochlearium).

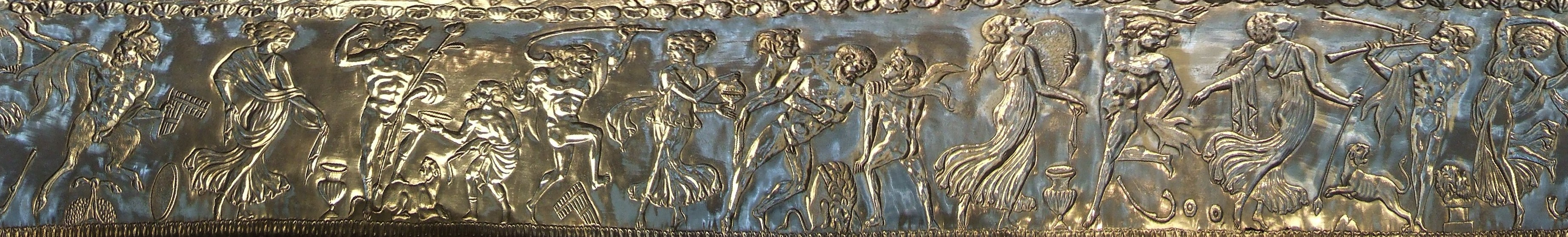
Unrolled version of the image above

=== Platters and dishes ===
The Great Dish (also known as the Oceanus Dish or as the Neptune Dish, from the face of a sea-god at its centre), which measures 605 mm (23.82 in) in diameter and weighs 8.256 kg (18.20 lb), is the outstanding piece. The decoration, which was worked by chasing from the front, is in three concentric zones. In the centre, the head of a marine deity, probably Oceanus, the personification of the ocean, is shown full-face, with a beard made of seaweed, and with dolphins emerging from his hair. This portrait is surrounded by a narrow inner frieze of decoration, populated by nereids (sea-nymphs), tritons and other mythical and natural sea-creatures, while the deep outermost zone carries imagery of the Bacchic thiasos: the dancing, music-making and drinking revels of the god Bacchus. More specifically, the triumph of Bacchus over Hercules is depicted. Hercules is shown staggering drunkenly and supported by two helpful satyrs. Bacchus himself appears with his panther and Silenus at the '12 o'clock' position on the circle in relation to the orientation of the Oceanus head, so that in most illustrations of the dish, he is seen upside-down at the top of the picture. The god Pan also appears in the composition, dancing and brandishing his pan-pipes, as do several dancing Maenads, the female devotees of Bacchus, and satyrs. The entire design is traditionally pagan, and is superbly executed.

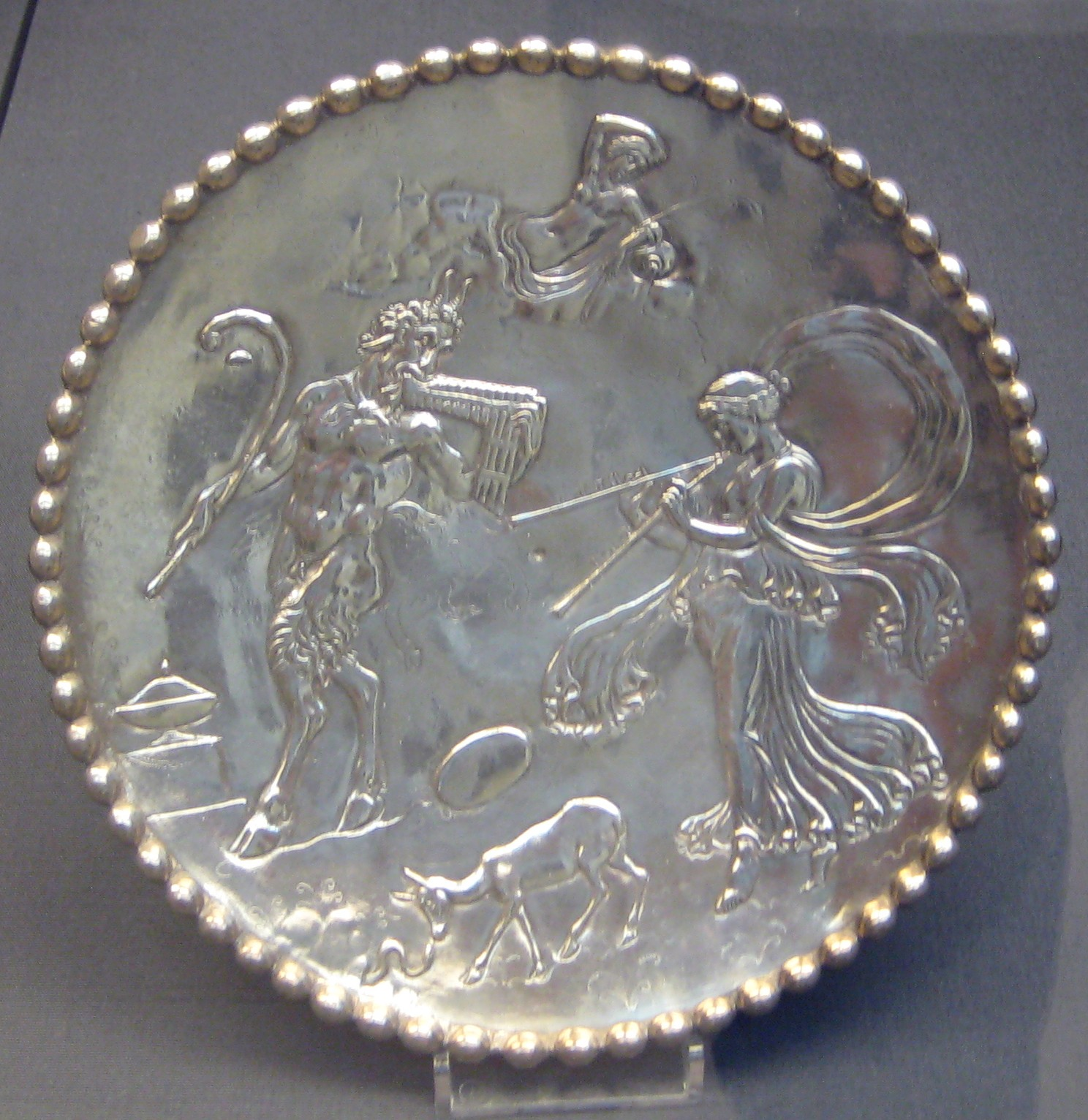
One of a pair of silver dishes from the Mildenhall Treasure, decorated with figures of Pan, a nymph and other mythological creatures

Two small plates (respectively 188 and 185 mm in diameter; weights 539 and 613 g.) are decorated in precisely the same style as the Great Dish: one shows the god Pan playing his pipes, and a maenad playing the double flute; the other shows a dancing satyr with a dancing maenad. Both of these small dishes have scratched graffiti in Greek on their undersides: eutheriou, meaning '(property) of Eutherios'. Both also have a bold, beaded edging, as do the Great Dish itself and several other items in the assemblage.

Another large, flat serving platter is almost as big as the Great Dish, with a diameter of 556 mm, but it is decorated in a very different and more restrained style, consisting of linear geometric decoration, inlaid with contrasting black niello (silver sulphide) to form a wide-rimmed border and a circular central panel.

=== Bowls ===
A deep, fluted bowl with two small swing handles (which were detached at the time of discovery, because solder tends to loosen during burial) is of a type found in several late Roman silver hoards, such as those in the Esquiline Treasure from Rome, and from Traprain Law in Scotland. The type is thought to have developed from earlier shell-shaped bowls, and to have been used to contain water at the dining table, intended for rinsing diners' hands. The chased geometric design in the centre of the Mildenhall fluted bowl depicts a six-pointed star, a device that had no specific symbolic meaning in the Roman period, but was simply one of many popular geometric figures.

The covered bowl is a vessel of particular interest. It is the earliest object in the hoard, and the only one whose general area of manufacture within the Roman Empire is known for certain. It belongs to a type that is known to have been manufactured in Gaul in the 3rd century AD. It has a narrow, horizontal flange set below the upright rim with scroll patterns inlaid in niello and a small nielloed rosette within the centre base. It has a high, domed lid that fits neatly over the vertical rim and has been decorated in a very different style, with two friezes of low-relief decoration. The upper zone consists of conventional foliate ornament, while the lower is a scene of centaurs attacking various wild animals, separated by Bacchic masks. The small raised rim at the top of the lid would have sufficed for handling it, but set within it is a 'knob' in the form of a silver-gilt statuette of a young, seated triton blowing a conch shell. This figure may well be a secondary addition to the lid; the lid itself, in 4th century style, is certainly a secondary addition to the bowl.

A set of four bowls with wide, horizontal rims represent a later development of the flanged bowl form. The rims, or flanges, are edged with large beads, and have low-relief decoration that once more follows the traditional pagan, Bacchic theme, with pastoral scenes, numerous animals, natural and mythical, and Bacchic masks. They also have circular medallions of figural decoration within the bowl. One (no.5) has a scene showing a hunter attacking a bear. This bowl, with a diameter of 300 mm, is a little larger than the other three, which all have a diameter of 268 mm and central medallions depicting single heads in profile: a young woman, a veiled matron, and a helmeted head. The identification of these figures remains uncertain.

There is a matching pair of smaller flanged bowls, (diameter 168 mm): they are intricately decorated with beading, foliate scrolls and small birds and hares on the rims, and have rosettes in relief in the centre base. The main bodies of these little bowls have a delicate, fluted internal pattern.

=== Pedestalled dishes ===
Two pedestalled dishes also form a pair. They were originally thought to be stemmed cups with wide, flat bases, somewhat like a modern wineglass in shape, but the foliate pattern on the 'bases' and the relatively unfinished interiors of the 'cups' show that they were used the other way up, as small (115mm diameter) flat dishes on a stem with a bowl-shaped base. Vessels of the same shape occur in the Traprain Law treasure, found in 1919.

=== Spoons ===
The remaining objects in the Mildenhall assemblage are all small eating utensils; five round-bowled ladles or spoons, and eight long-handled spoons of the common, late-Roman cochlear type. The round 'ladles' have zoomorphic handles cast in the form of dolphins. There is a comparable piece in the Traprain treasure, and there are two sets each of ten ladles of this type (although not with zoomorphic handles) in the Hoxne hoard. Only four handles survive from the Mildenhall ladles, and one of those is broken and incomplete. Because handles and bowls were soldered together in antiquity and had separated during burial, it is not certain which handle belongs to which bowl. In theory, if each component bowl and each handle were from a different utensil, there could have been as many as 9 ladles originally. In practice, it seems more likely that the handles and bowls all belong together; the group has therefore been reconstructed as five ladles, combining the existing handles and bowls.

== Inscriptions ==
The ownership graffiti of Eutherios on the two small Bacchic platters, several of the Mildenhall pieces, in common with many large items of Roman silver tableware from other finds, bear weight-inscriptions. These are scratched in inconspicuous places, such as bases, and can be very difficult to read and interpret, since they do not necessarily record the weight of the object itself, but sometimes of a set of which that object forms part. Although domestic silver was used for social display, so that its artistic quality was important to the owner, the actual bullion value of precious metal was part of his wealth, and needed to be noted and recorded.

== Importance ==
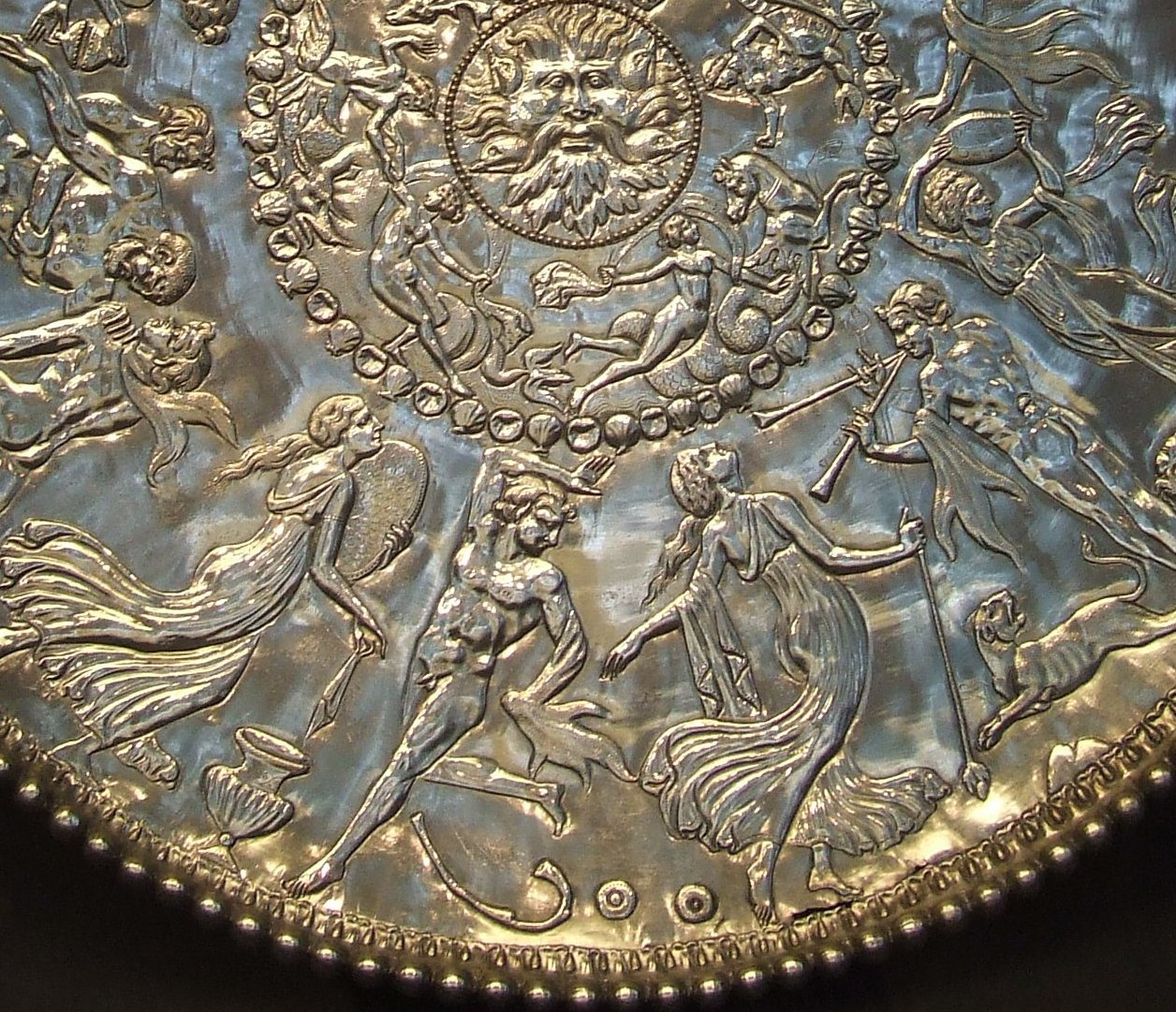
Detail of the Great Plate

The Mildenhall treasure contains pieces that undoubtedly belong to the first rank of Roman art and craftsmanship on an international scale of excellence. Although it was found at a time, and in a manner, that leave many unanswered questions about the reasons for and date of its concealment, the overall 4th-century dating is certain, and the decoration, with its traditional pagan themes, in some of the minor pieces, is characteristic of that period of change in the Roman Empire. We cannot yet say where objects such as the Great Dish were manufactured, but it seems safe to surmise that it would have been somewhere in the general Mediterranean region.

The rate of discovery of metal hoards of all periods has accelerated in Britain since the middle of the 20th century, due to a combination of circumstances that include changing agricultural practices, the rise of metal-detecting as a hobby, and better public understanding of archaeology. The Mildenhall group is exceptional by any standards, but in 1946 it seemed of too great a quality to be a British find.

Older finds, such as the treasures from Traprain Law and the Esquiline Hill in Rome, and more recent ones, such as the Kaiseraugst treasure from Augusta Raurica in Switzerland and the Hoxne hoard, can now place the Mildenhall treasure in international and Romano-British contexts that make it clear that personal possessions of very high quality were indeed in use in the frontier province of Britain in the 4th century AD. In this context, the Mildenhall material remains preeminent as a partial set of silver tableware of that period.

The hoard was number 7 in the list of British archaeological finds selected by experts at the British Museum for the 2003 BBC Television documentary Our Top Ten Treasures presented by Adam Hart-Davis.

== Controversy ==
While the majority of scholars support the identification and dating of the objects, and their association with the Mildenhall site, some scholars around the time of the discovery, were suspicious that the Mildenhall Treasure was misdated, or may not truly belong to the Mildenhall site. They argued that the pieces do not properly resemble the style and quality of work expected to be found in provincial Roman Britain, and that since none of the pieces show damage from having been "discovered" with a plough or shovel, there is the possibility that it was not in fact buried at Mildenhall all these centuries, and rather came from somewhere else. Some have suggested the pieces were looted from sites in Italy during World War II, brought back to England and re-buried so as to stage a "discovery", though most scholars give little credit to that theory, and abide by the standard story that the objects were hidden by fleeing Romans who intended to return for them at a later date and never did. The argument that the British province did not have silverware of such high quality has been disproved by a number of subsequent discoveries, for example the Hoxne Hoard found in Suffolk in 1992.

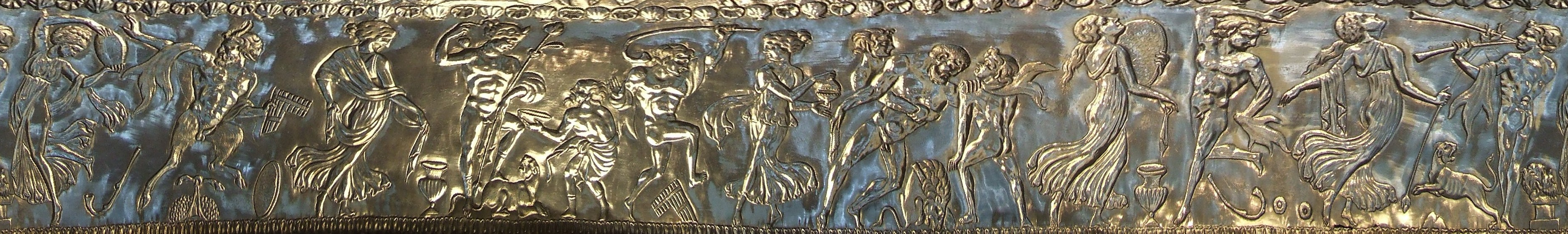
Dancers from one of the plates in the Mildenhall treasure, laid out digitally in a line.

Many of the residents of West Row (the village in which the treasure was found) are campaigning and believe it should be renamed to the West Row treasure after the village it was found in instead of the nearby Mildenhall.

== See also ==
- Berthouville Treasure
- Sevso Treasure
- Esquiline Treasure
- List of hoards in Britain
