= Norfolk Cricket Alliance =

Recreational club cricket league

- Format: 50 Over (45-Over in Division Two and below)
- Tournament format: Double round robin
- Number of teams: 10 in each division
- Current champion: Ashmanhaugh & Barton Wanderers CC
- Relegation to: Norfolk Cricket League

The Norfolk Cricket Alliance is a recreational club cricket league based in the English county of Norfolk with a handful of its member clubs residing just over the border in Suffolk. All of its member clubs are affiliated to the Norfolk Cricket Board. The league has seven divisions in total: the Premier Division, Division One, Division Two, Division Three, Division Four, Division Five East, and Division Five West as well as a multitude of junior divisions from under-9 through to under-17. It is a feeder league for the East Anglian Premier League with the Premier Division's champion eligible to enter a playoff with the winners of the Two Counties Cricket Championship and the Huntingdonshire Premier League for promotion to the EAPL if they so wish.
