= West Row =

Village in Suffolk, England

Coordinates: 52°20′54″N 0°27′45″E

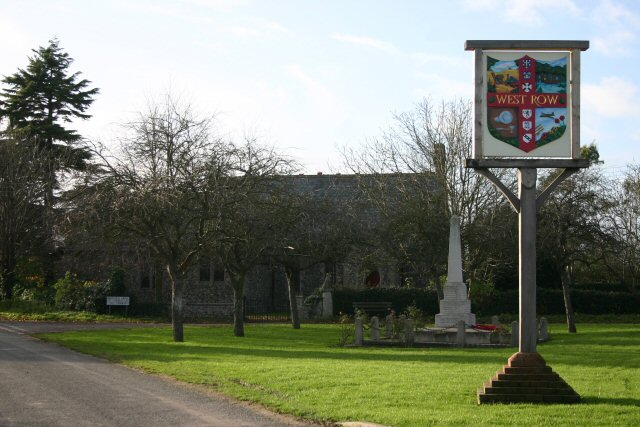
- West Row in December 2006

- Location within Suffolk
- Civil parish: West Row
- District: West Suffolk
- Shire county: Suffolk
- Region: East
- Country: England
- Sovereign state: United Kingdom
- Post town: BURY ST EDMUNDS
- Postcode district: IP28
- Dialling code: 01638
- Police: Suffolk
- Fire: Suffolk
- Ambulance: East of England
- UK Parliament: West Suffolk

West Row is a small village and civil parish in the English county of Suffolk. It is generally considered the edge of The Fens.

== Geography ==
West Row lies on the north bank of the navigable River Lark, 2 miles west of the town of Mildenhall, and just south of the large airbase RAF Mildenhall. It sits on the edge of the Fens.

== Amenities ==
West Row hosts a general store, fish and chip shop, a hairdressing salon and other small businesses. Mildenhall Stadium, to the north-west of the main village, is home a variety of activities, including stock car racing, greyhound racing, motocross and speedway. West Row is also home to the popular pub Jude's Ferry, which is located on the River Lark.

== History ==
The Mildenhall Treasure, a major hoard of highly decorated Roman silver tableware from the fourth-century AD, was discovered in West Row. The hoard was discovered by farmer Gordon Butcher while ploughing in January 1942. He did not recognize the objects for what they were, and the hoard did not come to the attention of the authorities until 1946. An inquest was held in June 1946, when the find was declared treasure trove and acquired by the British Museum in London.

In 2020 some inhabitants of West Row campaigned to have the hoard renamed as the West Row Treasure, to more accurately reflect where it was found. The treasure is the most notable of a number of Roman finds from the village.

== Parish Council ==
The parish was formerly part of the parish of Mildenhall, on 1 April 2019 it became a separate parish, following a successful campaign led by village resident John Smith, who was later awarded the Honorary Freedom of the Parish for his efforts. Following the 2019 local elections, nine members were elected and the first West Row Parish Council meeting was held at St Peter's Church hall on Wednesday 15 May 2019, where Michael Peachey was elected by the council as its first chairman.

== Education ==
West Row is home to West Row Academy, a small village school.
