= Tymal Mills =

English cricketer

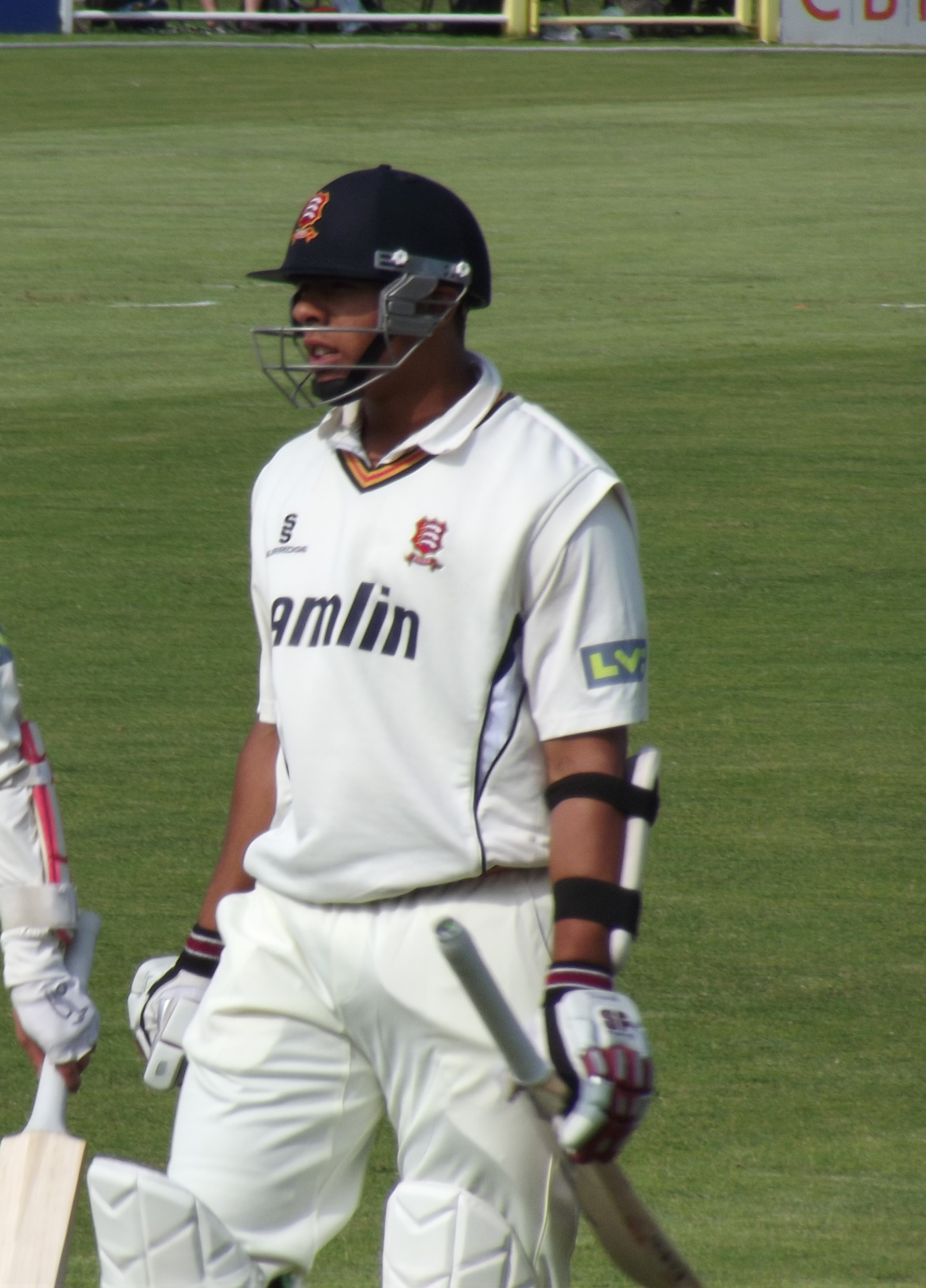
- Mills playing for Essex County Cricket Club

Personal information
- Full name: Tymal Solomon Mills
- Born: 12 August 1992 (age 34); Dewsbury, West Yorkshire, England
- Height: 183 cm (6 ft 0 in)
- Batting: Right-handed
- Bowling: Left-arm fast
- Role: Bowler

International information
- National side: England (2016-2023)
- T20I debut (cap 77): 5 July 2016 v Sri Lanka
- Last T20I: 16 December 2023 v West Indies
- T20I shirt no.: 72

Domestic team information
- Years: Team
- 2011–2014: Essex
- 2015–present: Sussex
- 2016: Chittagong Vikings
- 2016/17: Auckland
- 2017; 2020: Quetta Gladiators
- 2016/17: Brisbane Heat
- 2017: Royal Challengers Bangalore
- 2017/18: Hobart Hurricanes
- 2018: Karachi Kings
- 2018: Kandahar Knights
- 2019: Peshawar Zalmi
- 2021–2025: Southern Brave
- 2021/22: Perth Scorchers
- 2022: Mumbai Indians
- 2024–2025: Islamabad United
- 2025: Saint Lucia Kings
- 2025/26: Pretoria Capitals
- 2026: London Spirit

Career statistics
Competition	T20I	FC	LA	T20
Matches	16	32	23	277
Runs scored	8	260	7	272
Batting average	2.66	11.30	1.75	6.04
100s/50s	0/0	0/0	0/0	0/0
Top score	7	31*	3*	30
Balls bowled	322	3,531	790	5,720
Wickets	14	55	22	341
Bowling average	33.85	36.50	35.77	23.56
5 wickets in innings	0	0	0	0
10 wickets in match	0	0	0	0
Best bowling	3/27	4/25	3/23	4/13
Catches/stumpings	2/–	9/–	3/–	44/–
- Source: ESPNcricinfo, 15 August 2026

Tymal Solomon Mills (born 12 August 1992) is an English cricket left-arm fast bowler who played 14 Twenty20 International (T20) matches for England from 2016 to 2023, and has played for Sussex since 2015. Previously, he played for Essex from 2011 to 2014. Mills was a member of the England squad that won the 2022 T20 World Cup.

== Early life ==
Mills was born on 12 August 1992 in Dewsbury, West Yorkshire, England. He was educated at Mildenhall College of Technology in Mildenhall, Suffolk and played for Mildenhall Cricket Club. Mills studied sports journalism at the University of East London, before leaving to pursue a career in cricket.

== Domestic career ==
=== Essex ===
Mills made his first-class debut for Essex against the Sri Lankans in the tourist match of 2011 at Chelmsford. He made his Championship debut against Leicestershire at Grace Road in July 2011. His figures in the first-innings were 0–51, but in the second innings, he took 3–48. During the winter of 2011/12, Tymal Mills was named on the England Performance Programme (EPP). He began with training at Loughborough as well as camps in North Wales and with the Greater Manchester Fire Department. Mills then went to Potchefstroom, South Africa for three weeks in November on a specialist fast bowling programme. On Friday 16 December, Mills was a surprise inclusion in the 16 man England Lions squad. In 2012 Mills took 5 List A wickets and average of 58.60. He performed better in the Championship, taking 14 wickets at an average of 30.35. In 2013, his form in List A cricket improved, as he took ten wickets at an average of 23.30. However, he failed to kick on in the Championship, taking 11 wickets, three less than the previous season. His performances for Essex earned him another place on an England performance programme, and he took six wickets for the Lions on their tour of Sri Lanka.

=== Sussex ===
In 2014, Mills joined Sussex. He took wickets at an average of 20 in the English T20 competition, and his pace ensured he continued to stand out. He also bowled in the First division of the County Championship for the first time, taking 14 wickets at an average of just below 35. In 2015, he was diagnosed with a congenital back condition and as a result, took time out of playing red-ball cricket. He continued to play T20 cricket and took 19 wickets at an average of 18.84.

Tymal Mills continued to be a key player in the Sussex T20 side, across his stay at the county. He appeared at finals days in 2018, 2021 and 2024, after becoming the team captain ahead of the 2024 season. Prior to that, in 2023, he became the club's leading wicket taker in the format.

== Overseas leagues ==
=== Pakistan Super League ===
From 2016, Mills played for Quetta Gladiators in the Pakistan Super League before signing with Karachi Kings in 2018. In 2019, he was picked by Peshawar Zalmi before returning to Quetta for the 2020 season.

=== Indian Premier League ===
In February 2017, Mills was bought by Royal Challengers Bangalore for the 2017 Indian Premier League for ₹12 crore (equivalent to ₹18 crore, US$2.0 million or £1.5 million in 2026). This made him the second highest-paid overseas player in the 2017 IPL behind Ben Stokes. In February 2022, he was bought by the Mumbai Indians in the auction for the 2022 Indian Premier League tournament.

=== Other T20 franchise cricket ===
In September 2018, Mills was named in Kandahar's squad in the first edition of the Afghanistan Premier League tournament. In July 2019, he was selected to play for the Edinburgh Rocks in the inaugural edition of the Euro T20 Slam cricket tournament. However, the following month the tournament was cancelled.

Mills featured in the first edition of 'The Hundred', a 100 ball cricket competition for the 'Southern Brave'. The Southern Brave won the first cup/title of 'The Hundred' by beating Birmingham Phoenix in the finals. In April 2022, he was bought by the Southern Brave for the 2022 season of The Hundred.

== International career ==
On 5 July 2016, Mills made his T20I debut for England against Sri Lanka, taking figures of 0–22 as England won by eight wickets.

Mills was selected for the T20I series against India in January 2017. He took 1–27 in the first game as England recorded a seven-wicket victory. In the second match, he took figures of 1–36 as India made 144/8, which proved to be a winning score for India. In the final match of the series, he took figures of 1-31 and was then dismissed for a duck as England lost by 75 runs.

In September 2021, Mills was named in England's squad for the 2021 ICC Men's T20 World Cup. Mills made his international comeback for England after 5 years in their first match of the World Cup against West Indies and took 2-17 from his 4 overs.

== Personal life ==
Mills was diagnosed with a congenital back condition in 2015. He spent three months of the winter of 2020/21 recovering from a stress fracture and had to wear a back brace.

In 2025, Mills became the first known professional cricketer to set up a creator account on OnlyFans.
