= Mildenhall College Academy =

Location
- The Hub, Sheldrick Way; Mildenhall, Suffolk, IP28 7JX; England; 52°20′35″N 0°30′00″E

Information
- Department for Education URN: 139867 Tables
- Ofsted: Reports
- Principal: James Oxley
- Gender: Coeducational
- Age: 11 to 16–17
- Enrolment: 1490
- Houses: Austen, Brunel, Cavell, Newton and Seacole
- Colours: Red, Green, Blue, Light Blue and Yellow
- Website: http://www.mildenhall.attrust.org.uk

Mildenhall College Academy is a coeducational secondary school and sixth form with academy status, located in Mildenhall, Suffolk, England.

The school was built in the 1970s as Mildenhall Upper School and opened to students in 1976. Previously, it was awarded Technology, Applied Learning and Science College status and changed its name to Mildenhall College of Technology.

In 2012 two extra year groups formally joined the school, Years 7 and 8 pupils educated at the former Riverside Middle School site, at Sheldrick Way. The school reverted to its original name of Mildenhall College at this time. The school converted to academy status on 4 July 2014 and was renamed Mildenhall College Academy.

On 14 June 2020 the academy moved to its new main building in the Mildenhall Hub at Sheldrick Way. MCA6 operates a separate but adjacent specialised sixth form building.

The catchment area includes two large USAF contingents at RAF Mildenhall and RAF Lakenheath.

From 2013 to 2014 Mildenhall College Academy worked in partnership with the Gymnasium Theodorianum School in Paderborn, Germany to create a monument commemorating the Christmas Truce. The monument is thought to be the first of its kind in Europe. It is located in the Peace Village of Mesen, Belgium.

Since September 2021, a post 16 football and education programme partnership has run with Ipswich Town F.C. which allows students of Mildenhall College Academy to represent the football club whilst working on their current studies in a combined setting.

== Alumni ==
- Tymal Mills
- Adam Marriott
- Owen Pick
