= Traprain Law Treasure =

Hoard of Roman hacksilver found in Scotland

The Traprain Law treasure is a hoard of late Roman hacksilver, found on the hillfort of Traprain Law (East Lothian, SE Scotland)—then owned by former prime minister A. J. Balfour—during excavations in 1919. It is the largest hoard of Roman hacksilver currently known, weighing just over 23 kg (51 lb). It consists mostly of Roman silver vessels, a few of which are complete but most of which had been cut into fragments or crushed. There are a few items of personal equipment and coins. The hoard was probably buried in the early fifth century AD. Early interpretations saw it as loot; more recent views prefer to see it as diplomatic gifts or payment for military service. It is currently on display in the National Museum of Scotland in Edinburgh.

== Discovery and context ==
The hoard was found during excavations on the hill on 12 May 1919. The description of the discovery suggests it was buried in a pit dug within a house cluster on the uppermost levels of the western shoulder of the hill. During the Roman Iron Age, Traprain Law was a major local political centre beyond Hadrian's Wall. Excavations revealed a wealth of Roman finds, suggesting long-running connections to the Roman world. The hoard is usually interpreted as representing the burial of valuables to keep them safe.

== Restoration and replicas ==
The silver was restored by the Edinburgh silversmiths Brook & Son. This involved heating the silver to anneal it and make it malleable, so that it could be shaped back to its original form. Brook & Son also made replicas of the silver for sale. Some were direct copies or restorations of the originals; others were modified for contemporary taste, for instance by turning a spoon into a tea strainer.

== The original form of the silver ==
Most of the vessels started life as high-status tableware, such as large platters and small bowls used in the serving and eating of food at feasts, and jugs for serving wine and water. Various shapes of spoons were used for serving and eating food.

Another key category in the hoard was toilet silver – vessels used for bathing or personal hygiene, such as cosmetic containers, fluted water basins, and fragments of mirrors.

A few of the vessels were complete or nearly so, but most were fragments. Their original appearance could be worked out from preserved traces on them.

There were only a few personal items in the hoard, such as belt fittings and a brooch. A few silver coins (siliquae) were also found, dating to the reigns of Valens, Arcadius and Honorius. All had been clipped, which is typical of such coins used in Britain after the end of formal Roman rule.

The mixture of material indicates the hoard was put together from many different original sets of silver, and many different owners are represented among the ownership graffiti on the vessels. The iconography includes both Christian and pagan decoration.

== Selected highlights from the hoard ==
A near-complete jug from the hoard includes scenes from the Old and New Testament.

A complete fluted wash basin shows a Nereid riding a sea-panther.

Two panther handles probably came from a wine-serving vessel.

== Hacking the hoard ==
When the hoard was discovered, it was interpreted as loot hacked up after barbarian raids into the Roman empire. More recent analysis indicates that many of the items were originally cut quite carefully to standard Roman weights. It is suggested that the silver was converted to bullion at times of economic crisis within the Roman world, and was then used for diplomatic gifts or as payment for military service. Many of the pieces show signs of being cut more than once, suggesting they went through several hands.

== Reusing the silver ==
On Traprain Law, it seems the silver was valued as a raw material. Crucibles from the site show traces of silver working. Finds from the hill include a massive silver chain, probably made from reused Roman silver. Such Roman silver is argued to be the raw material for silver jewellery in the early medieval period.

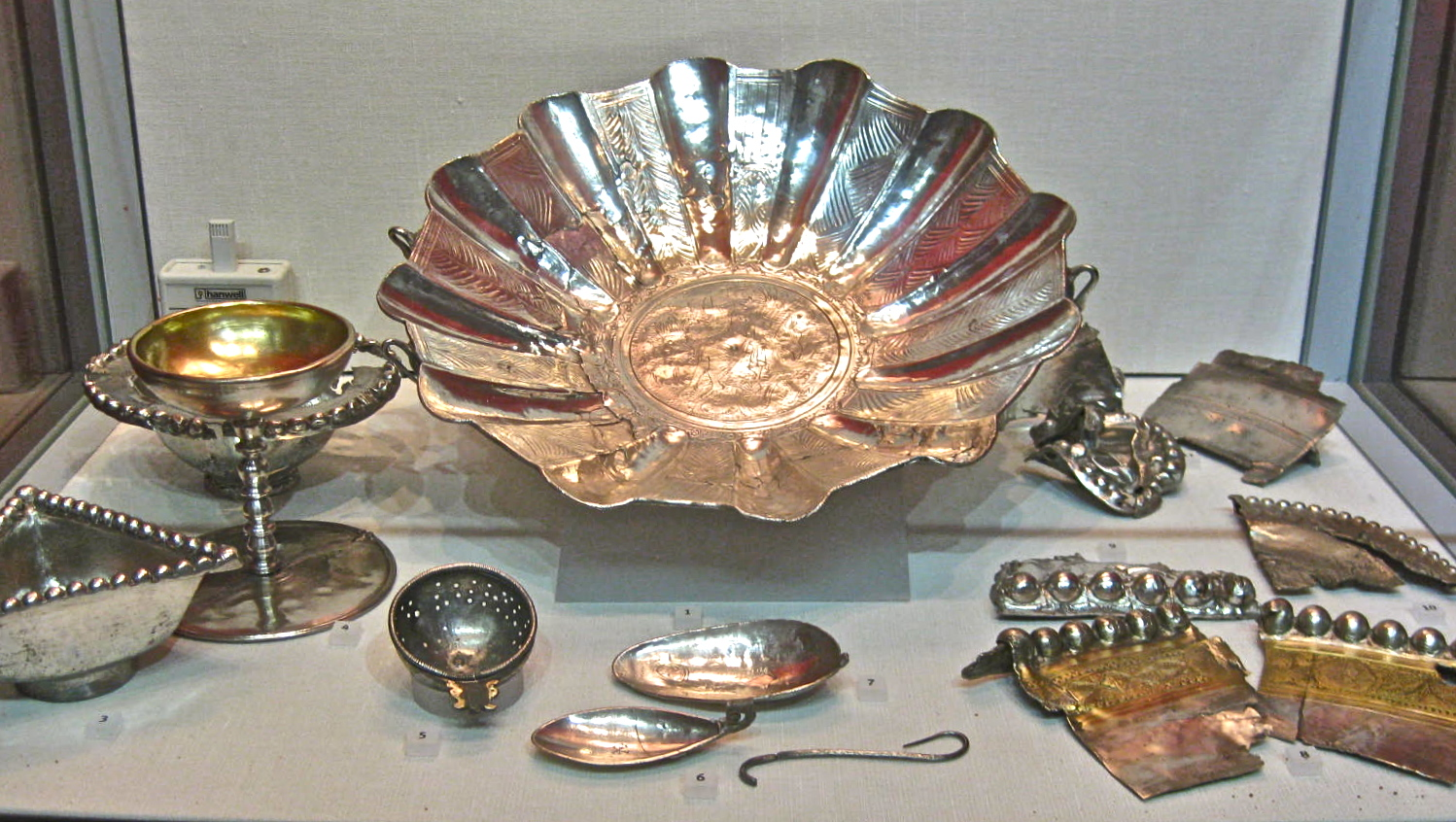
Silver from the Traprain Law Treasure, East Lothian, Scotland

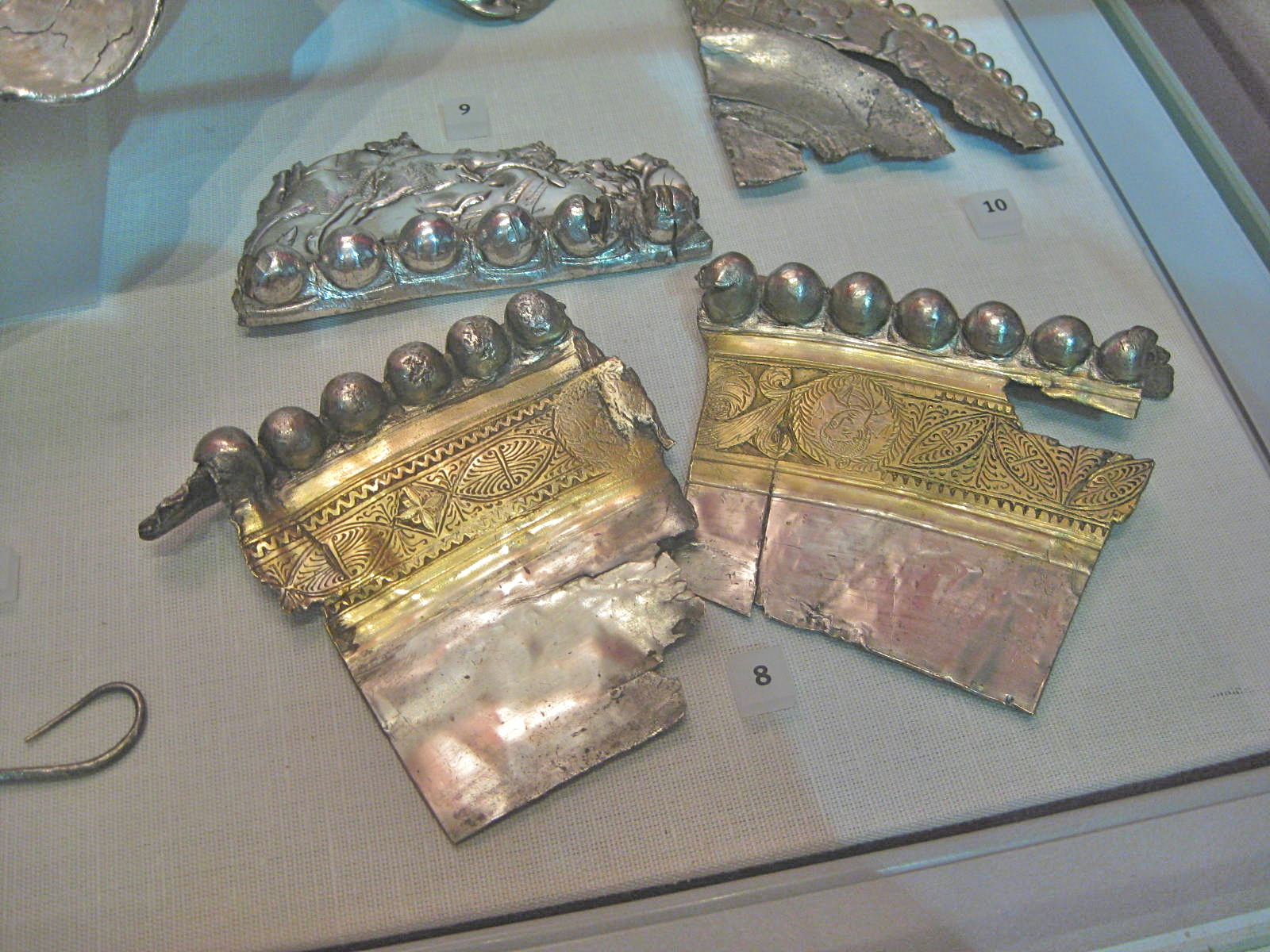
Fragments of Hacksilver

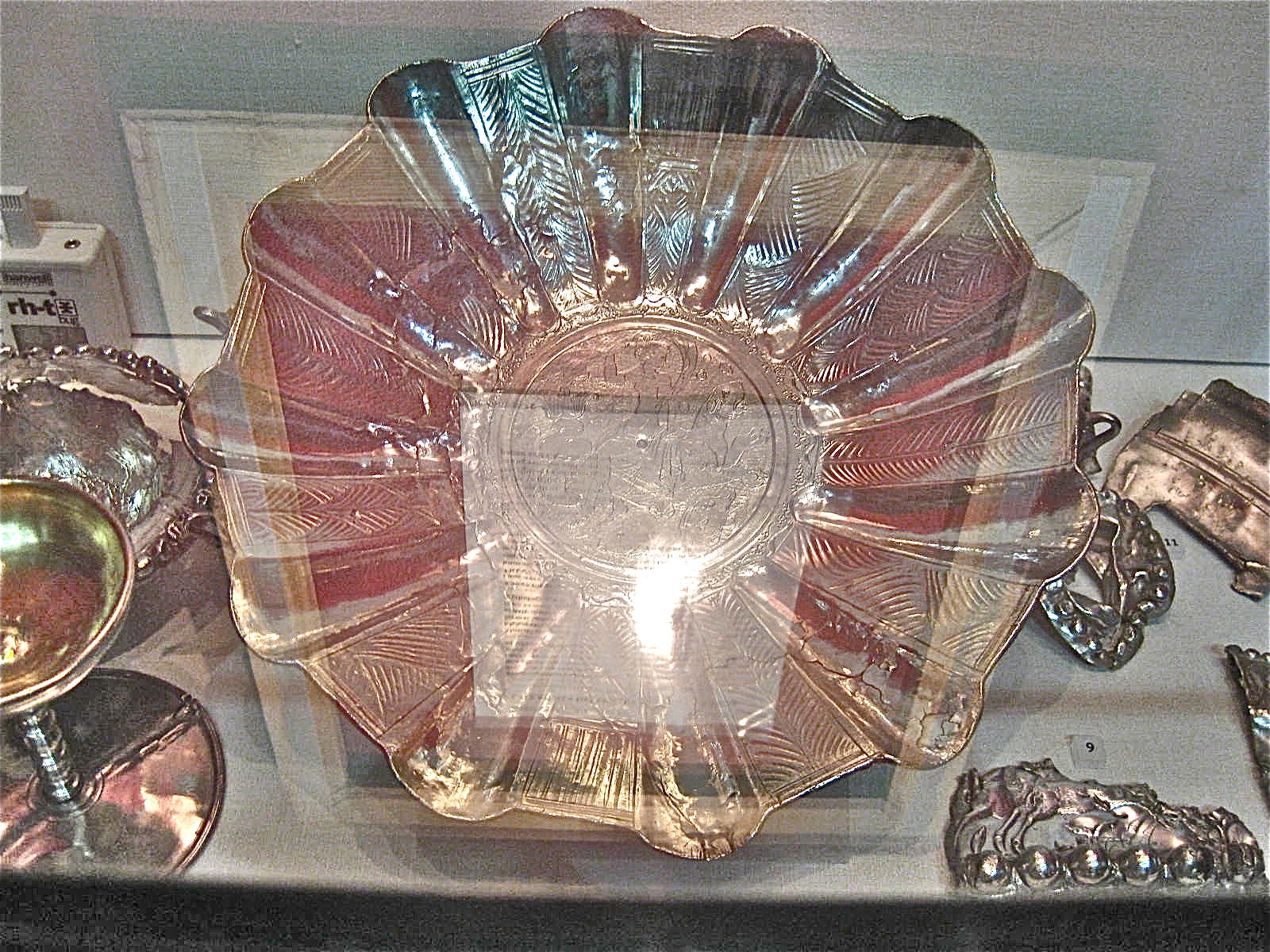
Silver bowl

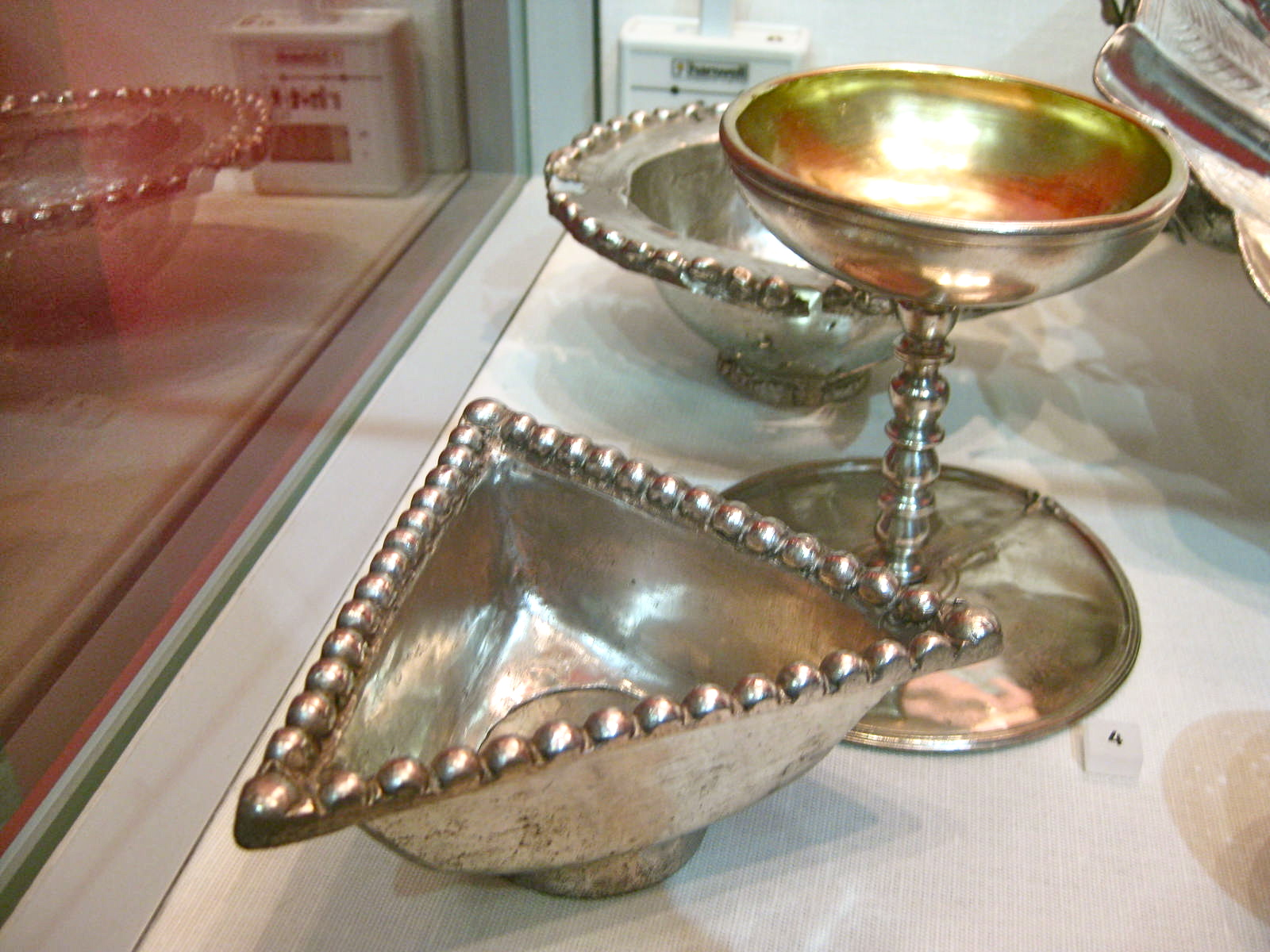
Traprain Law Treasure. Triangular silver dish, drinking cup and bowl.

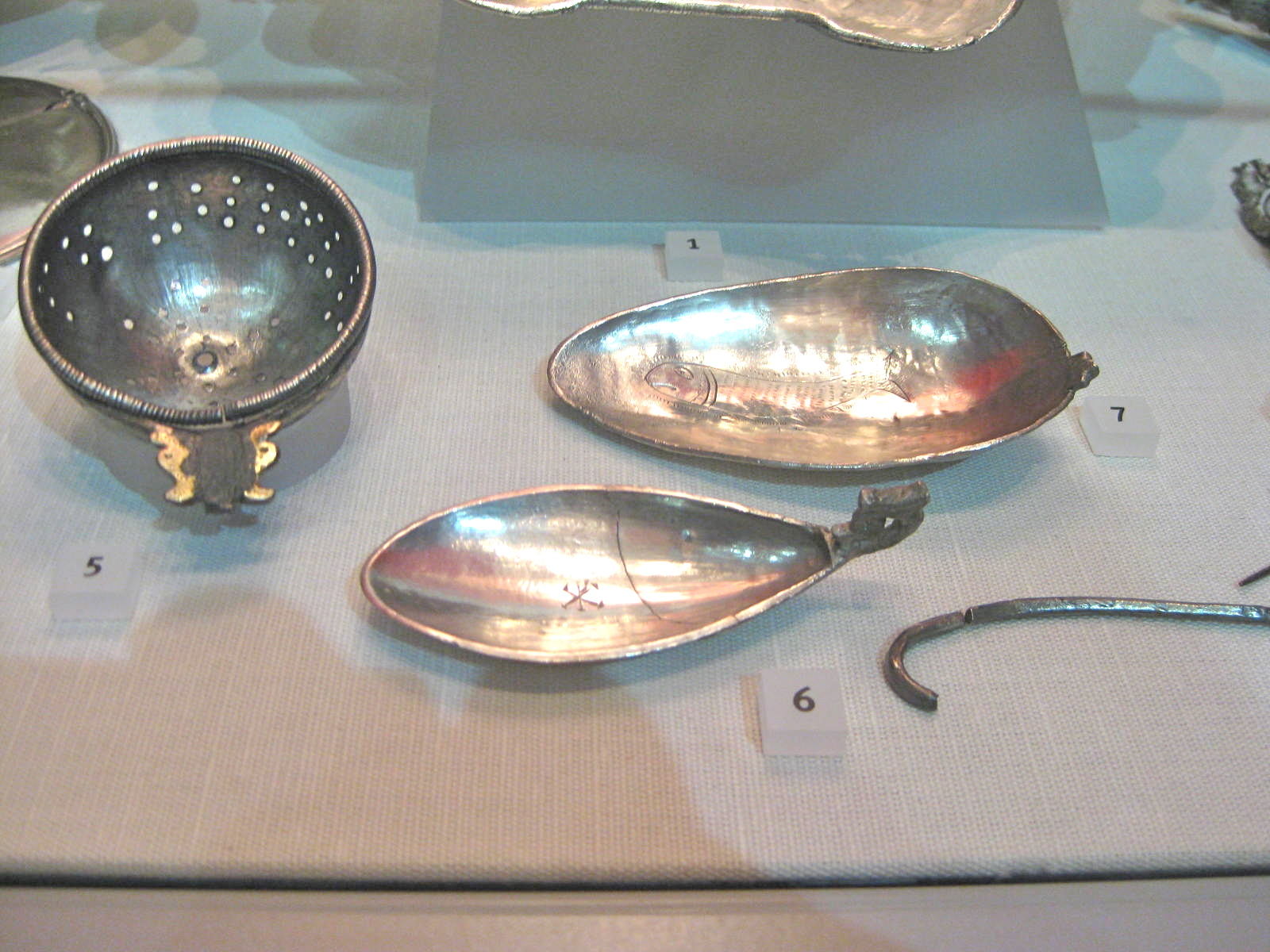
Traprain Law Treasure. Silver strainer and bowls of silver spoons.
