= Andrew Squire (cricketer) =

English cricketer

Personal information
- Full name: Andrew John Squire
- Born: 9 March 1964 (age 62); Mildenhall, Suffolk, England
- Batting: Right-handed
- Bowling: Right-arm medium

Domestic team information
- Years: Team
- 1985–2001: Suffolk

Career statistics
Competition	List A
Matches	4
Runs scored	46
Batting average	11.50
100s/50s	–/–
Top score	29
Balls bowled	–
Wickets	–
Bowling average	–
5 wickets in innings	–
10 wickets in match	–
Best bowling	–
Catches/stumpings	1/–
- Source: Cricinfo, 5 July 2011

Andrew John Squire (born 9 March 1964) is a former English cricketer. Squire was a right-handed batsman who bowled right-arm medium pace. He was born in Mildenhall, Suffolk.

Squire made his debut for Suffolk in the 1985 Minor Counties Championship against Cambridgeshire. Squire played Minor counties cricket infrequently for Suffolk from 1985 to 2001, which included 68 Minor Counties Championship appearances and 10 MCCA Knockout Trophy matches. He made his List A debut against Essex in the 1993 NatWest Trophy. He made 3 further List A appearances, the last of which came against Herefordshire in the 2nd round of the 2002 Cheltenham & Gloucester Trophy, which was played in 2001. In his 4 List A matches, he scored 46 runs at an average of 11.50, with a high score of 29.
