= East Anglian Premier Cricket League =

English cricket league

Thurlow Nunn East Anglian Premier Cricket League
- Countries: England
- Format: Limited Overs
- First edition: 1999
- Tournament format: League
- Number of teams: 12 (ECB Premier Division)
- Current champion: Horsford CC
- Most successful: Swardeston CC (8)
- Website: https://eapcl.play-cricket.com

The East Anglian Premier Cricket League, currently known as the Thurlow Nunn East Anglian Premier League for sponsorship purposes, is the top level of competition for recreational club cricket in the English region of East Anglia. Since it was formed in 1999 the league has been a designated ECB Premier League. It has three feeder leagues: the Cambridgeshire and Huntingdonshire Premier League, the Norfolk Cricket Alliance, and the Two Counties Cricket Championship (which covers Suffolk and the north of Essex). The winners of these three leagues are eligible for promotion to the East Anglian Premier Cricket League. Should more than one of them wish to join the league in the same season then a playoff is held.

The 2020 competition was cancelled because of the COVID-19 pandemic. A replacement competition was organised for the later part of the season when cricket again became possible, but with the winners not to be regarded as official league champions.

== Champions ==
- League Champions 1999–2018
  | Year | Club |
  |---|---|
  | 1999 | Vauxhall Mallards |
  | 2000 | Norwich |
  | 2001 | Norwich |
  | 2002 | Vauxhall Mallards |
  | 2003 | Vauxhall Mallards |
  | 2004 | Vauxhall Mallards |
  | 2005 | Bury St Edmunds |
  | 2006 | Bury St Edmunds |
  | 2007 | Swardeston |
  | 2008 | Swardeston |
  | 2009 | Vauxhall Mallards |
  | 2010 | Cambridge Granta |
  | 2011 | Cambridge Granta |
  | 2012 | Swardeston |
  | 2013 | Swardeston |
  | 2014 | Swardeston |
  | 2015 | Swardeston |
  | 2016 | Swardeston |
  | 2017 | Sudbury |
  | 2018 | Sudbury |
- League Champions 2019–2026
  | Year | Club |
  |---|---|
  | 2019 | Frinton on Sea |
  | 2020 | COVID-19 pandemic |
  | 2021 | Sawston and Babraham |
  | 2022 | Sawston and Babraham |
  | 2023 | Swardeston |
  | 2024 | Sawston and Babraham |
  | 2025 | Sawston and Babraham |
  | 2026 | Horsford |

== Performance by season from 1999 ==
Key
| Gold | Champions |
| Blue | Left League |
| Red | Relegated |

Performance by season, from 1999
| Club | 1999 | 2000 | 2001 | 2002 | 2003 | 2004 | 2005 | 2006 | 2007 | 2008 | 2009 | 2010 | 2011 | 2012 | 2013 | 2014 | 2015 | 2016 | 2017 | 2018 | 2019 | 2020 | 2021 | 2022 | 2023 | 2024 | 2025 | 2026 |
|---|---|---|---|---|---|---|---|---|---|---|---|---|---|---|---|---|---|---|---|---|---|---|---|---|---|---|---|---|
| Ashmanhaugh and Barton Wanderers | | | | | | | | | | | | | | | | | | | | | | | | | | 8 | 9 | 10 |
| Burwell (Note: Burwell entered into a merger and became Burwell and Exning before the 2018 season.) | | | | | | | | | | | | 7 | 9 | 10 | 3 | 10 | 8 | 8 | 8 | | | | | | | | | |
| Burwell and Exning | | | | | | | | | | | | | | | | | | | | 9 | 11 | | 12 | | | | | |
| Bury St Edmunds | 10 | 7 | 6 | 7 | 8 | 8 | 1 | 1 | 6 | 2 | 7 | 8 | 5 | 7 | 10 | 9 | 9 | 9 | 11 | 11 | 8 | | 5 | 8 | 3 | 7 | 11 | 9 |
| Cambridge (Note: Cambridge were known as Cambridge Granta until the end of the 2018 season.) | 2 | 4 | 4 | 3 | 4 | 2 | 2 | 4 | 8 | 3 | 4 | 1 | 1 | 11 | 2 | 6 | 3 | 2 | 4 | 8 | 6 | | 6 | | | | | |
| Cambridge and Godmanchester (Note: Cambridge St Giles and Godmanchester Town entered into a merger after the 2000 season and became Cambridge and Godmanchester, but this merger was dissolved after the 2003 season and Godmanchester Town took the place in the Premier League.) | | | 3 | 4 | 5 | | | | | | | | | | | | | | | | | | | | | | | |
| Cambridge St Giles | 8 | 10 | | | | | | | | | | | | | | | | | | | | | | | | | | |
| Clacton on Sea (Note: Clacton on Sea resigned from the Premier League after the 2013 season.) | 5 | 6 | 7 | 2 | 6 | 7 | 5 | 3 | 9 | 5 | 6 | 9 | 10 | 4 | 6 | | | | | | | | | | | | | |
| Copdock and Old Ipswichian | | | | | | | | | | | | | | 6 | 11 | 4 | 5 | 3 | 5 | 6 | 7 | | 8 | 4 | 8 | 2 | 2 | 2 |
| Downham Stow | | | | | | | | | | | | | | | | | | | | | | | | | | | 7 | 6 |
| Fakenham | | | | | 10 | 4 | 8 | 8 | 10 | 10 | 9 | 12 | | | | | | | | | | | | | | | | |
| Frinton on Sea | | | | | | | | | | | | | | | | | 2 | 6 | 6 | 4 | 1 | | 10 | 10 | 10 | 11 | 10 | 12 |
| Godmanchester Town | 9 | 9 | | | | 3 | 7 | 9 | 2 | 6 | 12 | | | | | | | | | | | | | | | | | |
| Great Witchingham | | | | | | | | | 5 | 7 | 8 | 6 | 2 | 5 | 5 | 2 | 6 | 10 | 3 | 7 | 5 | | 4 | 5 | 9 | 6 | 12 | |
| Halstead | 4 | 8 | 10 | | | | | | | | 11 | 11 | 8 | 12 | | | | | | | | | | | | | | |
| Horsford | | | | | | | | 5 | 7 | 9 | 10 | 5 | 6 | 3 | 8 | 5 | 7 | 11 | 12 | 5 | 4 | | 11 | 6 | 11 | 3 | 3 | 1 |
| Maldon | | | 9 | 8 | 2 | 9 | 10 | | | | | | | | | | | | | | | | | | | | | |
| Mildenhall | 7 | 5 | 5 | 9 | 9 | 10 | 6 | 10 | | | | | | | | | | | 9 | 3 | 10 | | 3 | 2 | 4 | 5 | 8 | 5 |
| Norwich | 3 | 1 | 1 | 6 | 3 | 5 | 9 | 6 | 4 | 8 | 2 | 10 | 12 | | | 3 | 10 | 4 | 10 | 12 | | | | | | | | |
| Ramsey | | | | 10 | | | | | | | | | | | | | | | | | | | | | | | | 8 |
| Saffron Walden | | | | | | | | | | | 5 | 2 | 11 | 8 | 4 | 11 | 12 | | | | 9 | | 7 | 9 | 6 | 12 | | |
| Sawston and Babraham | | | | | | | | | | | | | | | | | | | | | | | 1 | 1 | 2 | 1 | 1 | 3 |
| Sudbury | | | | | | | | | | | | | 7 | 9 | 12 | | | 7 | 1 | 1 | 3 | | 9 | 3 | 7 | 9 | 5 | 11 |
| Swardeston | 6 | 3 | 2 | 5 | 7 | 6 | 4 | 2 | 1 | 1 | 3 | 3 | 3 | 1 | 1 | 1 | 1 | 1 | 2 | 2 | 2 | | 2 | 7 | 1 | 4 | 6 | 4 |
| Vauxhall Mallards | 1 | 2 | 8 | 1 | 1 | 1 | 3 | 7 | 3 | 4 | 1 | 4 | 4 | 2 | 7 | 7 | 4 | 5 | 7 | 10 | 12 | | | | | | | |
| Wisbech Town | | | | | | | | | | | | | | | | | | | | | | | | | 12 | | | |
| Witham | | | | | | | | | | | | | | | | | | | | | | | | 11 | 5 | 10 | 4 | 7 |
| Woolpit | | | | | | | | | | | | | | | 9 | 8 | 11 | 12 | | | | | | | | | | |
| References | | | | | | | | | | | | | | | | | | | | | | (Note: Coronavirus pandemic forced a reduction in league activity.) | | | | | | |
