= Fen Ditton =

Village in Cambridgeshire, England

Coordinates: 52.22°N 0.17°E

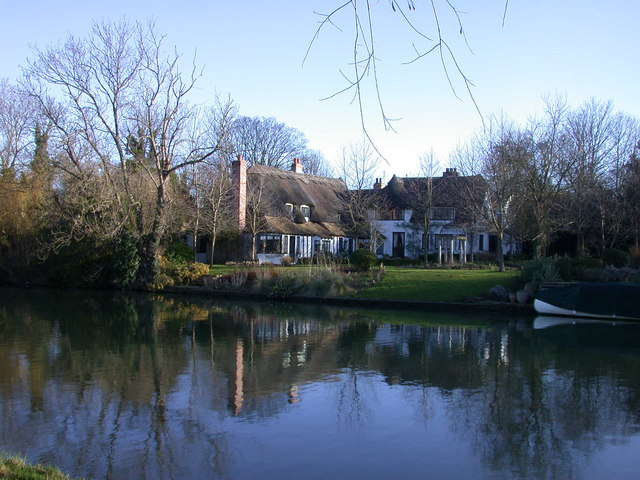
- Thatched cottages on the outskirts of Fen Ditton, from across the River Cam

- Location within Cambridgeshire
- Population: 747; 760 (2011)
- OS grid reference: TL485602
- District: South Cambridgeshire
- Shire county: Cambridgeshire
- Region: East
- Country: England
- Sovereign state: United Kingdom
- Post town: CAMBRIDGE
- Postcode district: CB5
- Dialling code: 01223
- UK Parliament: South East Cambridgeshire
- Website: www.fenditton.org

Fen Ditton is a village and civil parish in the South Cambridgeshire district, on the northeast edge of Cambridge in Cambridgeshire, England. In 2011 the parish had a population of 760. The parish covers an area of 5.99 square kilometres (2 sq mi).

Fen Ditton lies on the east bank of the River Cam, on the road from Cambridge to Clayhithe, and close to junction 34 of the A14. The nearest railway station is Cambridge North; Waterbeach station is several kilometres north of the village.

== History ==
The site has been occupied since at least neolithic times, and stone tools have been found on the meadows between the village and the river.

The name was first recorded in around 950 as Dittone, meaning "the village by the ditch", derived from the Fleam Dyke, the prehistoric ditch that passed through the village from the river to the edge of the fens at Stow-cum-Quy and can still be seen just to the east of the village. The name was later changed to its present name to distinguish it from Wood Ditton.

The village's history is closely connected to its position on the River Cam, which provided trade throughout the medieval period and its principal connection to other settlements. A large wharf at the western end of the High Street allowed goods to be delivered for the annual Stourbridge Fair between the 12th and 14th centuries, but trade declined in later centuries. The wharf was still in use in 1845, but the opening of the London-Cambridge railway line removed its commercial purpose and it closed. More recently the river has been used primarily for leisure purposes.

A paper mill was opened in the parish in around 1550, only the second recorded in England. Standing on Coldham's Brook at the junction of modern-day Ditton Walk and Newmarket Road it had fallen out of use by the early 19th century; it is now occupied by offices.

The first road in the village passed between the river and the church, linking Fen Ditton to Horningsea from at least the start of the 15th century. By the 17th century it had been moved to the east of the church. Neither route to Horningsea is still in evidence, but its route south towards Cambridge is now marked by Ditton Walk and the Wadloes footpath. In the 18th century, a new road was added on the higher ground to link the Newmarket Road to Fen Ditton and Horningsea and now serves as the main route through the village. The railway line from Cambridge to Fordham, which opened in 1884, ran through the southern half of the parish.

The area known as Fen Ditton Fields was part of the parish until it was transferred to Cambridge in 1938. With the expansion of Cambridge, housing was built on the fields in the first half of the 20th century, and it also contains Cambridge City Cemetery, Cambridge's only remaining cemetery that takes new burials. The area is now bounded by the former railway line, Coldham's Common, and Cambridge Airport. Pye Telecommunications, pioneers of the use of radios in taxis, opened their site in this area in 1944; it was taken over by Philips in the 1980s.

== Churches ==
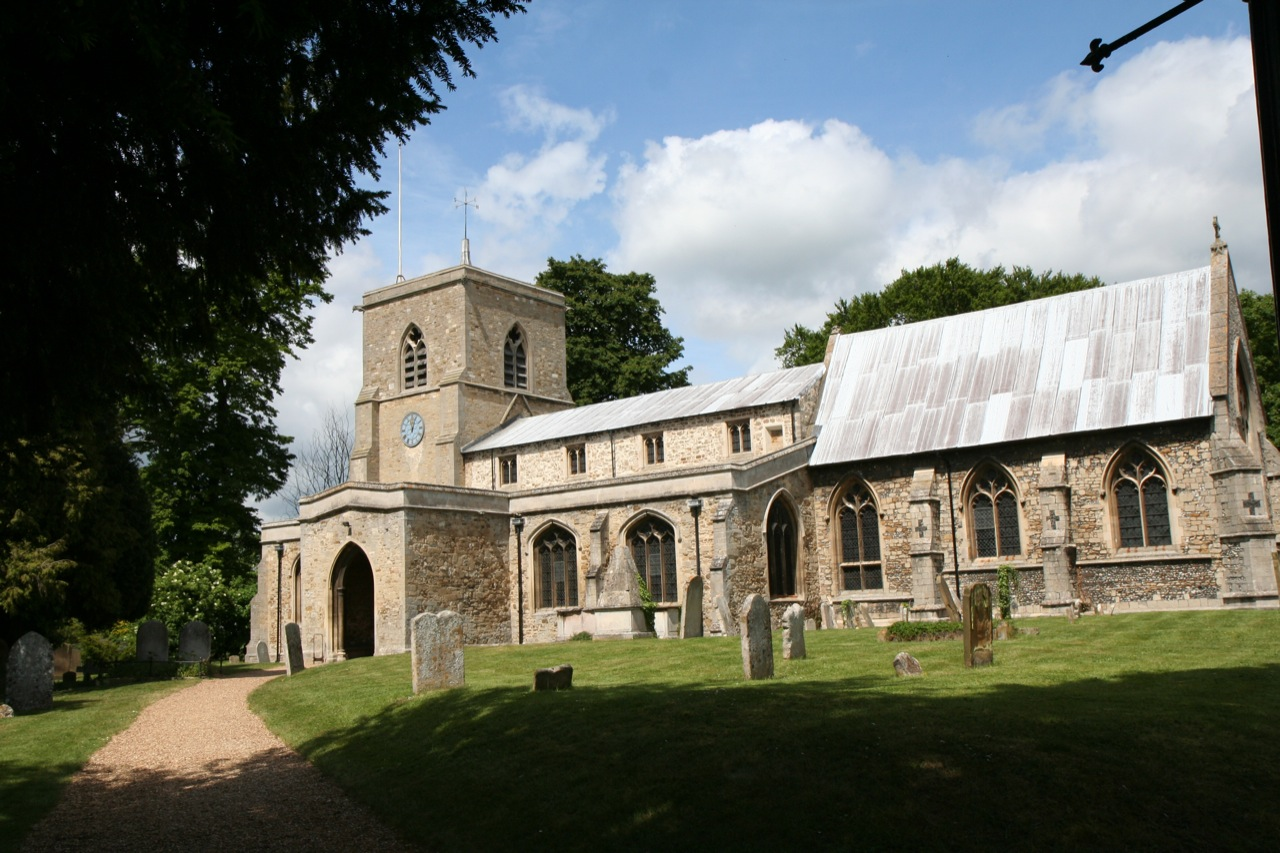
The Church of St Mary The Virgin

The Church of England parish church of St Mary the Virgin was built in the 12th century. Made from Barnack stone and rubble with clunch and limestone dressings, it consists of a chancel, nave, north and south aisles, a south porch, and west tower. Some original 12th-century masonry survives, and the tower dates from the 13th century. It is topped by a weather vane in the form of a rowing eight.

The Roman Catholic church of St Vincent de Paule is located on Ditton Lane. It is a timber building, clad with corrugated iron, and as a pre-fabricated building has resided in multiple sites (as a makeshift hospital, a club and a hall) until being set up as a church in its current location in 1958. The church has a regular attendance of around 80 people. Although on Ditton Lane, and a short distance from the village, this church is actually within the City of Cambridge, not Fen Ditton.

== Village life ==
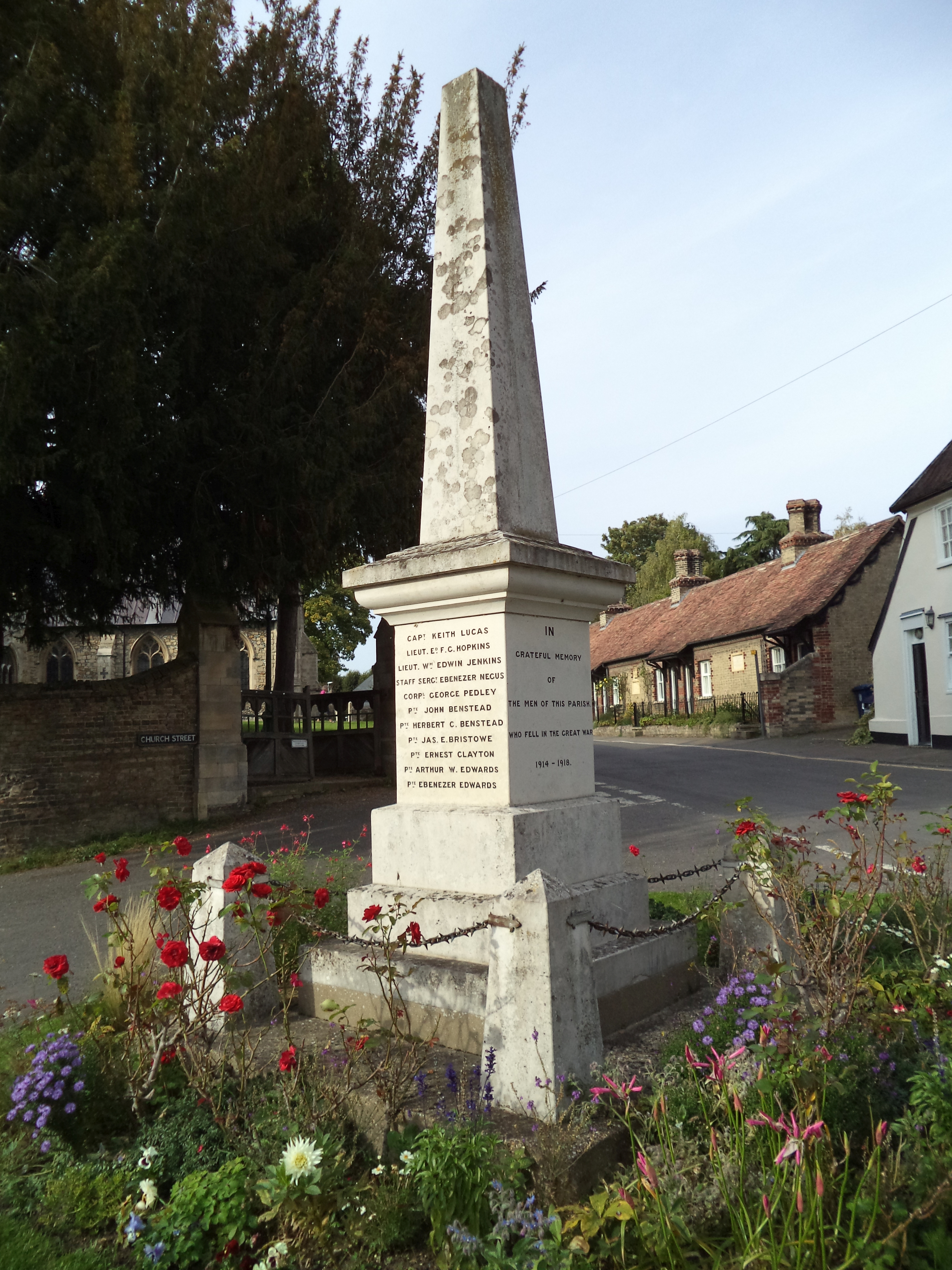
The village war memorial, a Grade II listed building

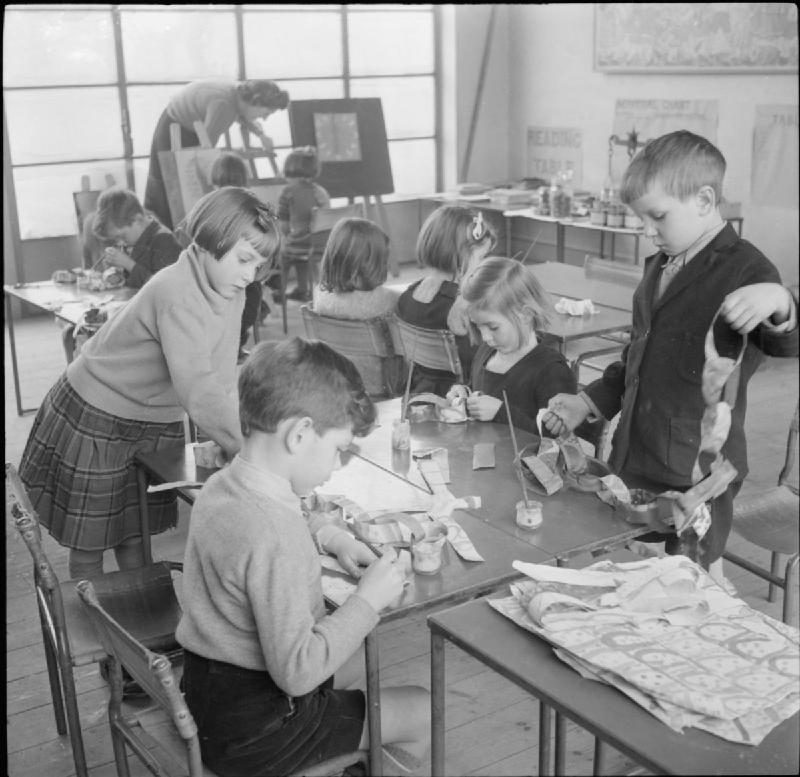
"A Modern Village School" children at Fen Ditton Junior School in 1944

Fen Ditton is often associated with The Bumps, the annual rowing races held on the river alongside the village. This association can be seen in the church's weather vane, which takes the form of a rowing eight, and a service for rowers is held there each year. During the 1940s and 50s a ferry would operate across the river to The Plough public house during May Week until it sank in 1961.

There are two public houses in Fen Ditton. The Plough runs down to the river at Green End; The King's Head, active since at least 1760, is situated alongside the church. Former pubs include The Sluice or Pike and Eel, to the north of the village on the river; The Harvest Home on Green End; and The Blue Lion, rebuilt in 1951, where the High Street meets the Horningsea Road. The Blue Lion closed in March 2012 to allow the site to be redeveloped as housing. The Ancient Shepherds on the High Street was built as three cottages in 1540. It closed as a public house in June 2020, was bought by Mark J Poynton, and reopened later in 2020 as a restaurant, under the name of MJP @ The Shepherds. Fen Ditton Gallery was established at 23 High Street in 1990 and is generally run on an appointment basis with several exhibitions a year.

Children initially attend Fen Ditton Primary school and usually then go on to Bottisham Village College. The village's store and post office closed in 2005. The shop unit is presently used as a studio and gallery by Christina Green, one of Fen Ditton's artists in residence.

Fen Ditton is home to both a cricket and a football team. Both sides play their home games on Fen Ditton Recreation Ground.

The village's war memorial, unveiled in 1921, sits on a grass island at the junction of High Street and Church Street. It is a tapered obelisk set on a plinth that lists the names of 22 villagers killed in the First World War and a further five from the second. Among those commemorated is Captain Keith Lucas. The war memorial is a Grade II listed building.

On Church Street, opposite the church, is a small, picturesque row of three cottages, known as Willys' Almshouses. Wall plaques explain they were built by Sir Thomas Willys, 1st Baronet, whose family were the principal landowners until the 1730s, as six cottages ("for six poor widows") in 1665, rebuilt in 1877, and finally, in 1968-69, combined into the three used today. These are operated by a charity, "for rental by single independent people of the parish of Fen Ditton".

== Notable native ==
- Elizabeth Cheney, the great-grandmother of Anne Boleyn, Jane Seymour, and Catherine Howard, three of the wives of King Henry VIII of England, thus making her great-great-grandmother to King Edward VI and Queen Elizabeth I.

== Nearby villages ==
- Horningsea
- Clayhithe
- Waterbeach

== See also ==
- Fen Ditton Halt railway station
