= Mildenhall railway station =

Former railway station in England

Coordinates: 52.3383°N 0.5078°E

Mildenhall
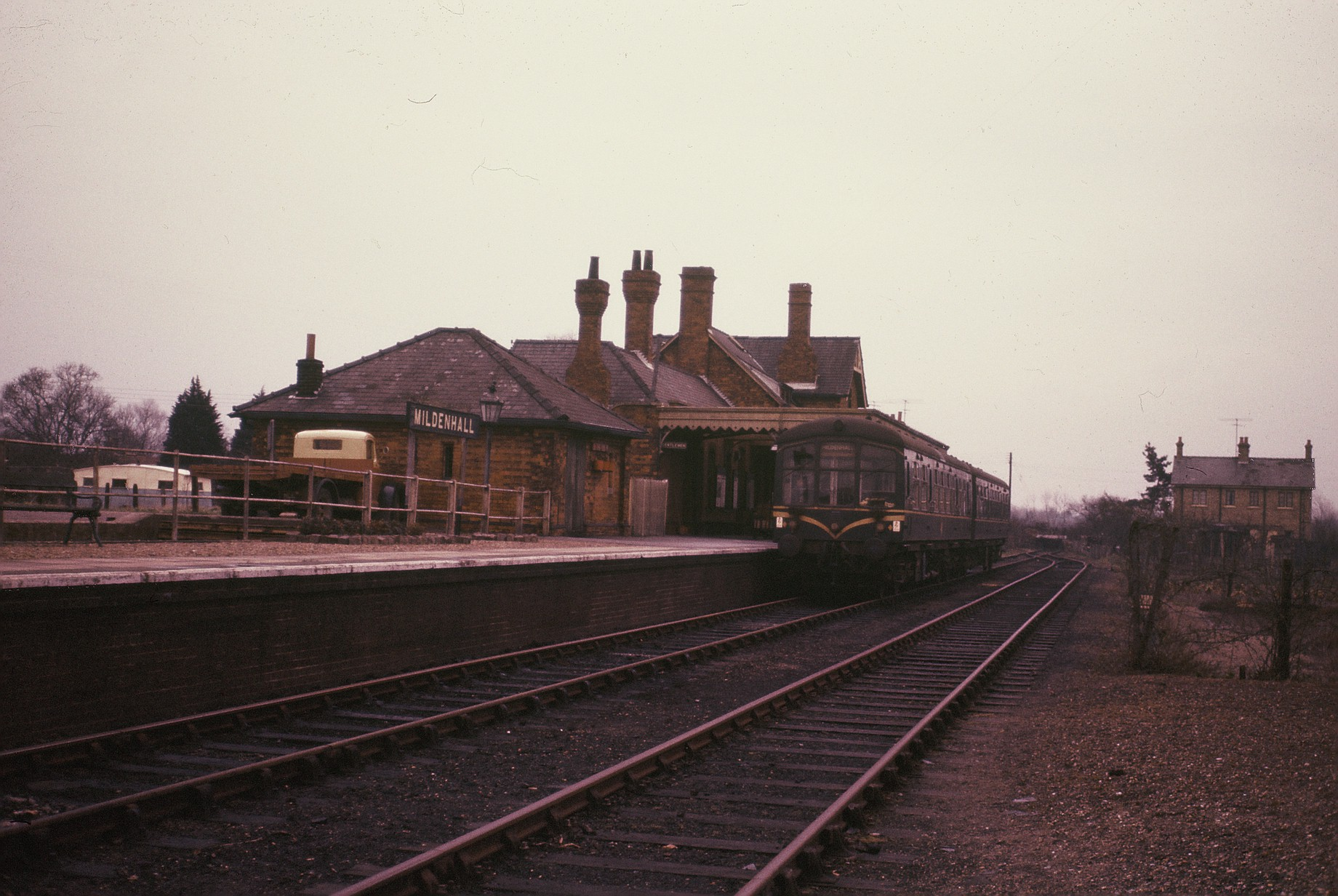

General information
- Location: Mildenhall, West Suffolk; England
- Platforms: 1

Other information
- Status: Disused

History
- Original company: Great Eastern Railway
- Pre-grouping: Great Eastern Railway
- Post-grouping: London and North Eastern Railway

Key dates
- 1 Apr 1885: Station opened
- 18 Jun 1962: Station closed for passengers
- 13 July 1964: closed for freight
Location

Mildenhall railway station is a disused railway station that was the terminus of the closed Cambridge to Mildenhall railway. It served the market town of Mildenhall, Suffolk, and closed for passengers in 1962. The station building is now a private residence and the goods shed to the west of the station has been used by local businesses for storage and other purposes.

| Preceding station | Disused railways | Following station |
|---|---|---|
| Worlington Golf Links Halt | Cambridge to Mildenhall railway | Terminus |
