= Bottisham and Lode railway station =

Disused railway station in England

Bottisham and Lode
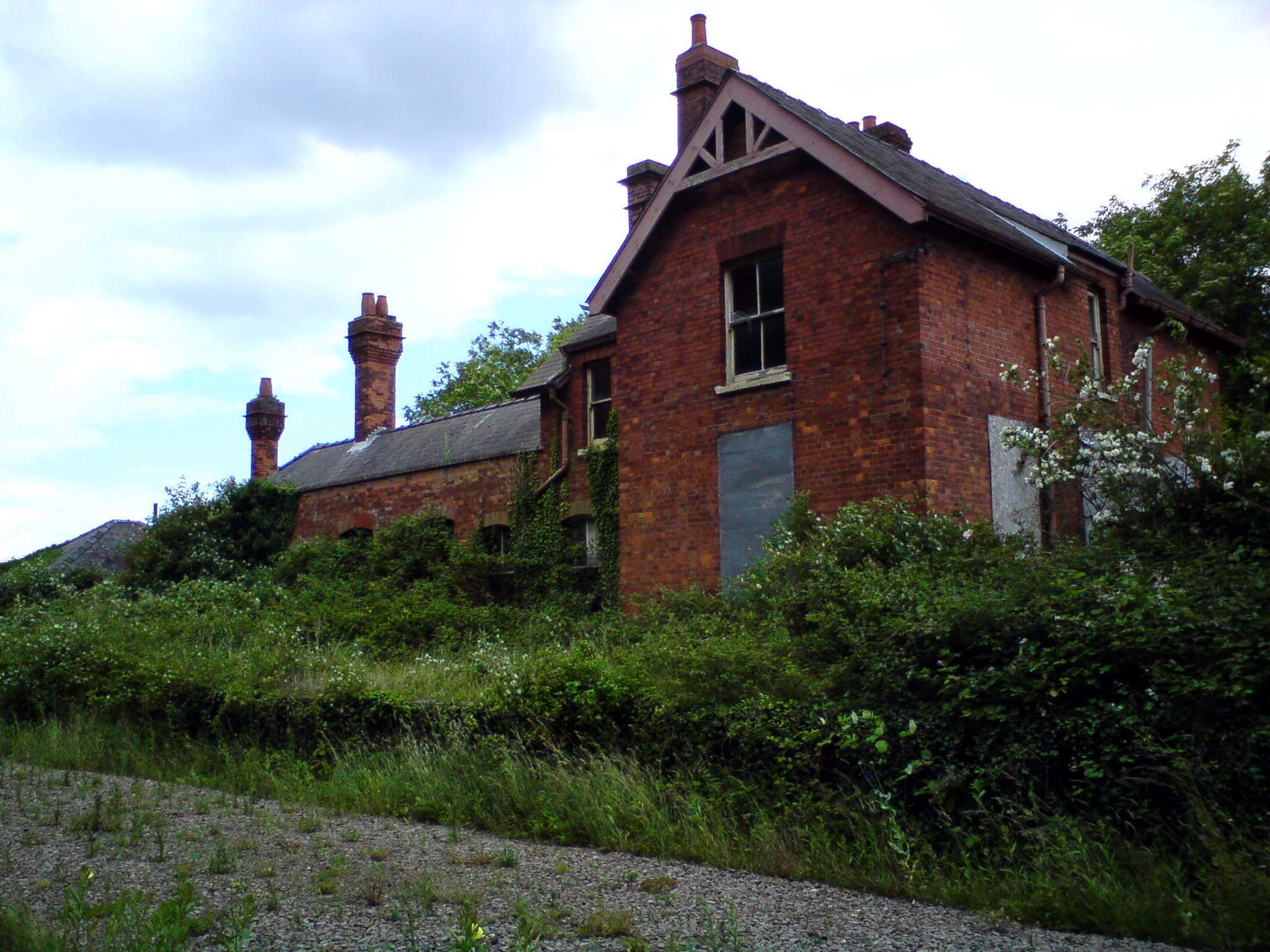
- The station in 2008, viewed from the track bed

General information
- Location: Lode, East Cambridgeshire; England
- Coordinates: 52.2446°N 0.2431°E
- Grid reference: TL531630
- Platforms: 2

Other information
- Status: Disused

History
- Original company: Great Eastern Railway
- Pre-grouping: Great Eastern Railway
- Post-grouping: London and North Eastern Railway

Key dates
- 2 June 1884: Opened as Bottisham
- 22 April 1897: renamed Bottisham and Lode
- 18 June 1962: Closed for passengers
- 13 July 1964: closed for goods
Location

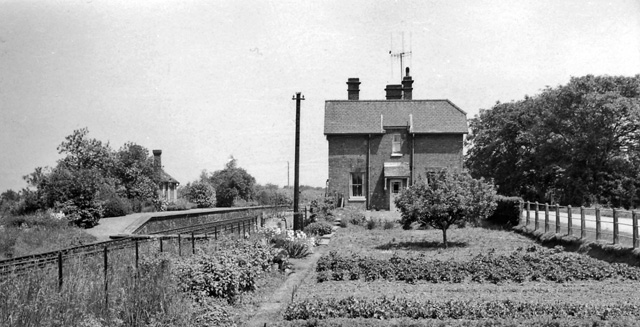
View towards Fordham and Mildenhall in 1963

Bottisham and Lode Railway Station is a disused railway station on the Cambridge to Mildenhall railway in East Anglia, England. The station is located on the northern outskirts of the village of Lode, at the end of Station Road.

The station opened in 1884 as one of the intermediate stops on the Cambridge to Mildenhall railway. It was originally known as Bottisham Station at the beginning and became Bottisham and Lode Station in 1897 when the then single parish of the separate settlements of Bottisham and Lode split into two distinct village parishes for the first time.

The station closed for passengers in 1962 and goods in 1964.

Preceding station	Disused railways	Following station
Quy	Great Eastern; Cambridge to Mildenhall railway	Swaffham Prior
