= Golf Club Halt railway station =

Golf Club Halt railway station may refer to the following former stations in the United Kingdom:

- Golf Club Halt railway station (Scotland), serving the Alyth Golf Club, in the Scottish county of Perth and Kinross
- Golf Club Halt railway station (England), in Hove, East Sussex

== See also ==
- Golf Street Halt railway station, in Carnoustie, Scotland
- Worlington Golf Links Halt railway station, a station former in Suffolk, England
