= Worlington, Suffolk =

Village in Suffolk, England

Coordinates: 52.333°N 0.486°E

Worlington
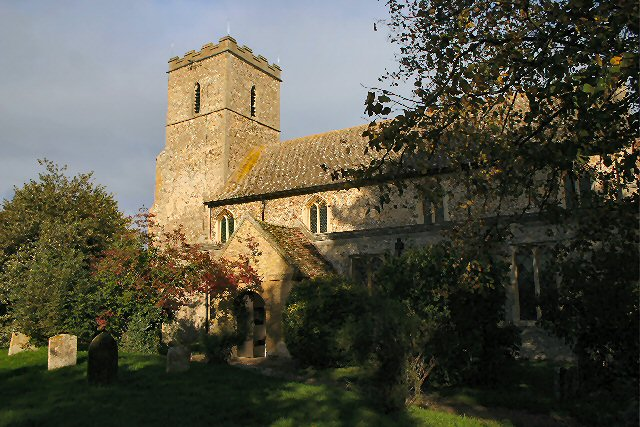
- Church of All Saints, Worlington

- Location within Suffolk
- Population: 526 (2011)
- OS grid reference: TL695735
- District: West Suffolk
- Shire county: Suffolk
- Region: East
- Country: England
- Sovereign state: United Kingdom
- Post town: Bury St Edmunds
- Postcode district: IP28

Worlington is a village and civil parish in the English county of Suffolk and in the old hundred of Lackford.

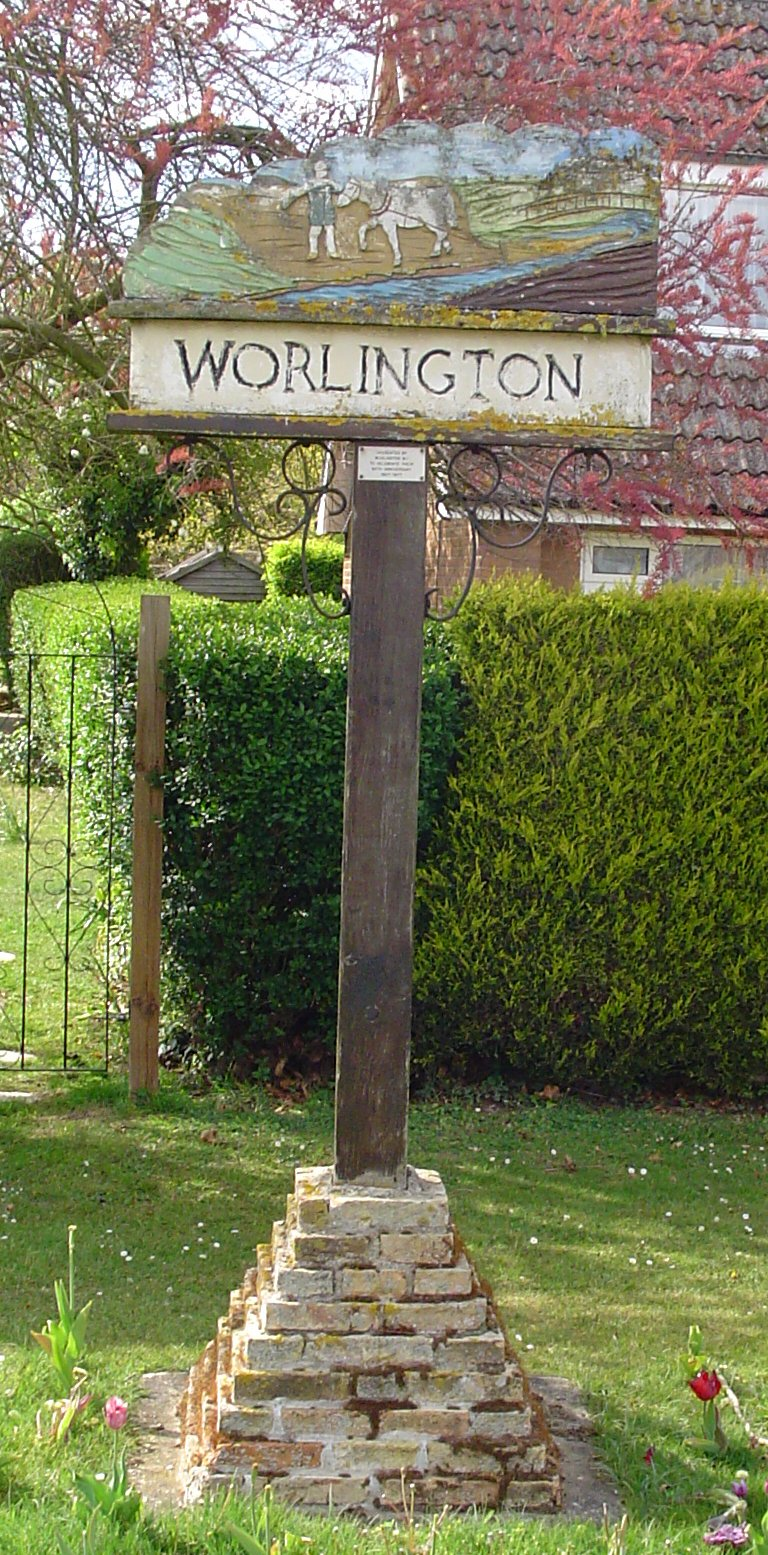
Village sign in Worlington

It is recorded in the Domesday Book of 1086 as Wirilintona.

Worlington lies on the south bank of the River Lark on the B1102 Fordham–Mildenhall road one mile south-west of Mildenhall.

The B1102 (The Street) forms the main road with Golf Links Road heading south from the centre of the village. Worlington Golf Links Halt railway station used to serve the golf club.

Administratively, Worlington forms part of the district of West Suffolk.

== History ==
The Church of All Saints lies in the north-west corner of the village, along Church Lane, and there are walnut trees in this area as well as a Walnut Grove lane. Worlington Church has five bells; one dates back to c. 1310, making this one of Suffolk's oldest, but older still is a circa 800 AD sanctus bell that is situated in Moyses Museum in Bury St Edmunds.

Worlington Hall is an elegant 16th-century former Manor House, which was built in 1570.

Royal Worlington and Newmarket Golf Club, a 9-hole course, is situated the south of the village, dating back to the reign of Queen Victoria. The heathland course is known as the "sacred nine".

== Present day ==
The population of the village is 550. There are no shops. The Walnut Tree is the village pub. The post office closed in 2004 following an armed robbery.

Worlington Parish Council meets in the village hall, which also provides a venue for theatre, church and dance groups. A children's play area was constructed in 2003 near the hall, in the village's old industrial area. Close by is an old maltings.
