= Swaffham Prior railway station =

Former railway station in Cambridgeshire, England

Swaffham Prior
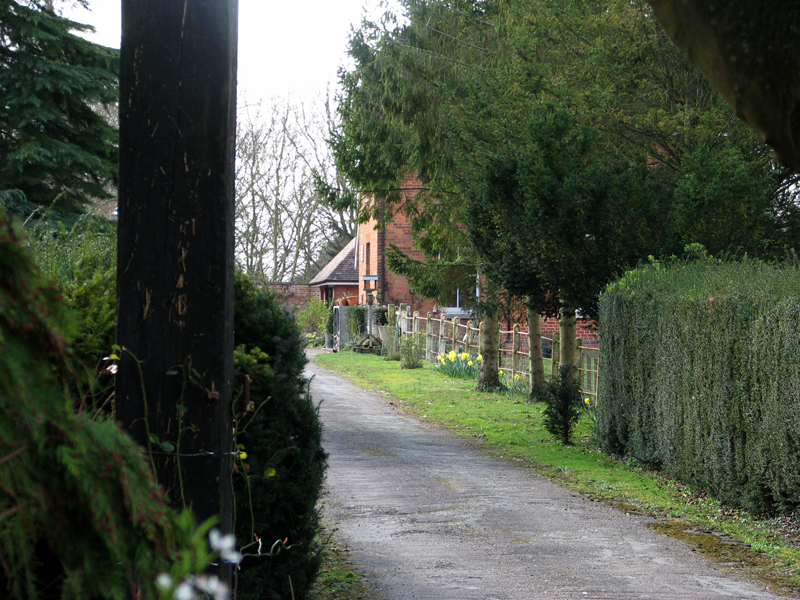
- The site of the station in 2011

General information
- Location: Swaffham Prior, East Cambridgeshire; England
- Coordinates: 52.2558°N 0.2857°E
- Grid reference: TL561644
- Line: Cambridge and Mildenhall branch
- Platforms: 1

Other information
- Status: Disused

History
- Original company: Great Eastern Railway
- Pre-grouping: Great Eastern Railway
- Post-grouping: London and North Eastern Railway

Key dates
- 2 June 1884: Station opened
- 18 June 1962: Station closed for passengers
- 13 July 1964: Closed for freight
Location

Swaffham Prior railway station was a stop on the Cambridge and Mildenhall branch of the Great Eastern Railway. It served the village of Swaffham Prior, Cambridgeshire, England.

== History ==
The railway began operating to Swaffam Prior in 1884; the station closed in 1962 and then passed into private ownership. It is located on Station Road and is still inhabited.

Former Services

| Preceding station | Disused railways | Following station |
|---|---|---|
| Bottisham and Lode | Great Eastern; Cambridge and Mildenhall branch | Burwell |
