= Horningsea =

Village in Cambridgeshire, England

Coordinates: 52°14′26″N 0°11′11″E

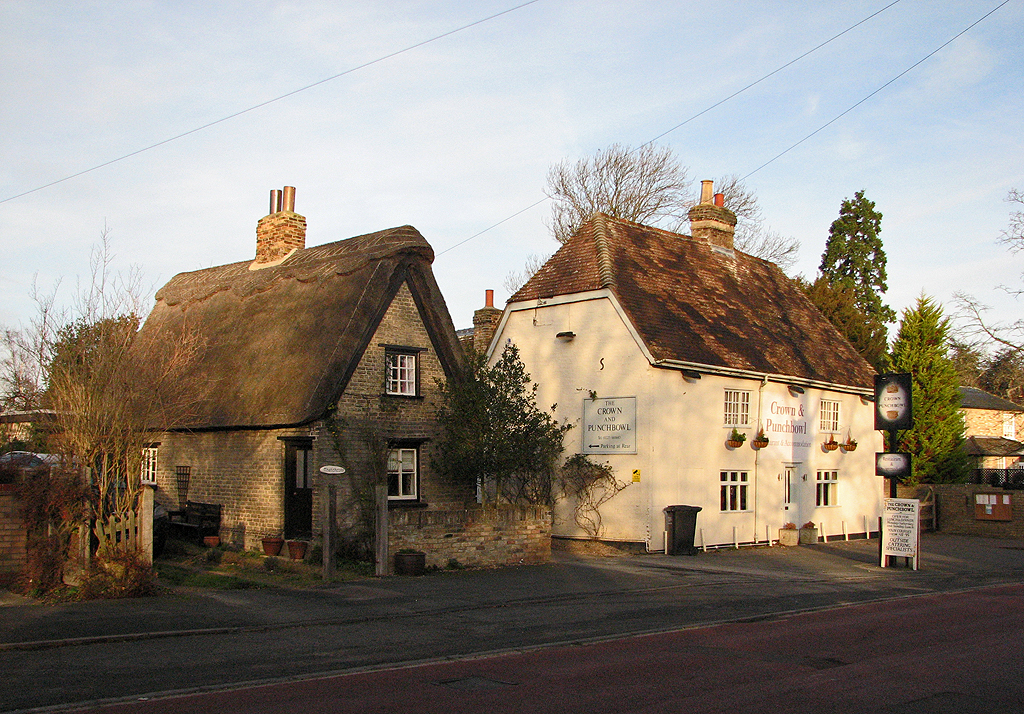
- The Crown and Punchbowl public house

- Flag

- Location within Cambridgeshire
- Area: 2.6 sq mi (6.7 km^{2})
- Population: 330 (ONS - 2021 census)
  - Density: 127/sq mi (49/km^{2})
- OS grid reference: TL4962
- District: South Cambridgeshire
- Shire county: Cambridgeshire
- Region: East
- Country: England
- Sovereign state: United Kingdom
- Post town: CAMBRIDGE
- Postcode district: CB25
- Dialling code: 01223
- Police: Cambridgeshire
- Fire: Cambridgeshire
- Ambulance: East of England
- UK Parliament: South East Cambridgeshire

Horningsea is a small village north of Cambridge in Cambridgeshire, England. The parish covers an area of 2.6 square miles (6.7 km^{2}; 1,700 acres). It lies on the east bank of the River Cam, and on the road from Cambridge to Clayhithe. The nearest railway station is Waterbeach, 1 1/2 miles (2.4 km) away.

Listed as Horningesea in the Domesday Book, the village's name derives from either "Island (or dry ground in marsh) of a man called Horning" or "Island by the horn-shaped hill".

== History ==
Central to the development of Horningsea as a settlement has been its location on the River Cam, whose use for navigation dates back to at least Roman times. Around 4,000 years ago, the parish consisted of a chalk promontory between marshland and the sea, and there is evidence of Iron Age habitation. Around 1,000 years ago, it had become a peninsula extending northwards into the undrained fens.

Between the 2nd and 4th centuries Horningsea was used for pottery by the Romans and was connected with Lincoln by Car Dyke, a Roman canal.

Drainage of the area began with Bottisham Lode in early medieval times, and a bridge is mentioned in the village in the late 13th century. In 1637 the Earl of Bedford was given 400 acres in Fen Ditton, Horningsea, and Stow cum Quy which were drained over the following 20 years. The remainder of the parish was drained in the late 18th and 19th centuries, other than the area around Snout's Corner, which is still fenland.

The Saxon hamlets of Eye and Clayhithe have been part of Horningsea parish since 1279, with Clayhithe situated where the ancient peninsula reached the river.

In 2006 Horningsea's conservation area was re-appraised by South Cambridgeshire District Council. The report contains much detail about the current status of the village and its buildings.

== Church ==
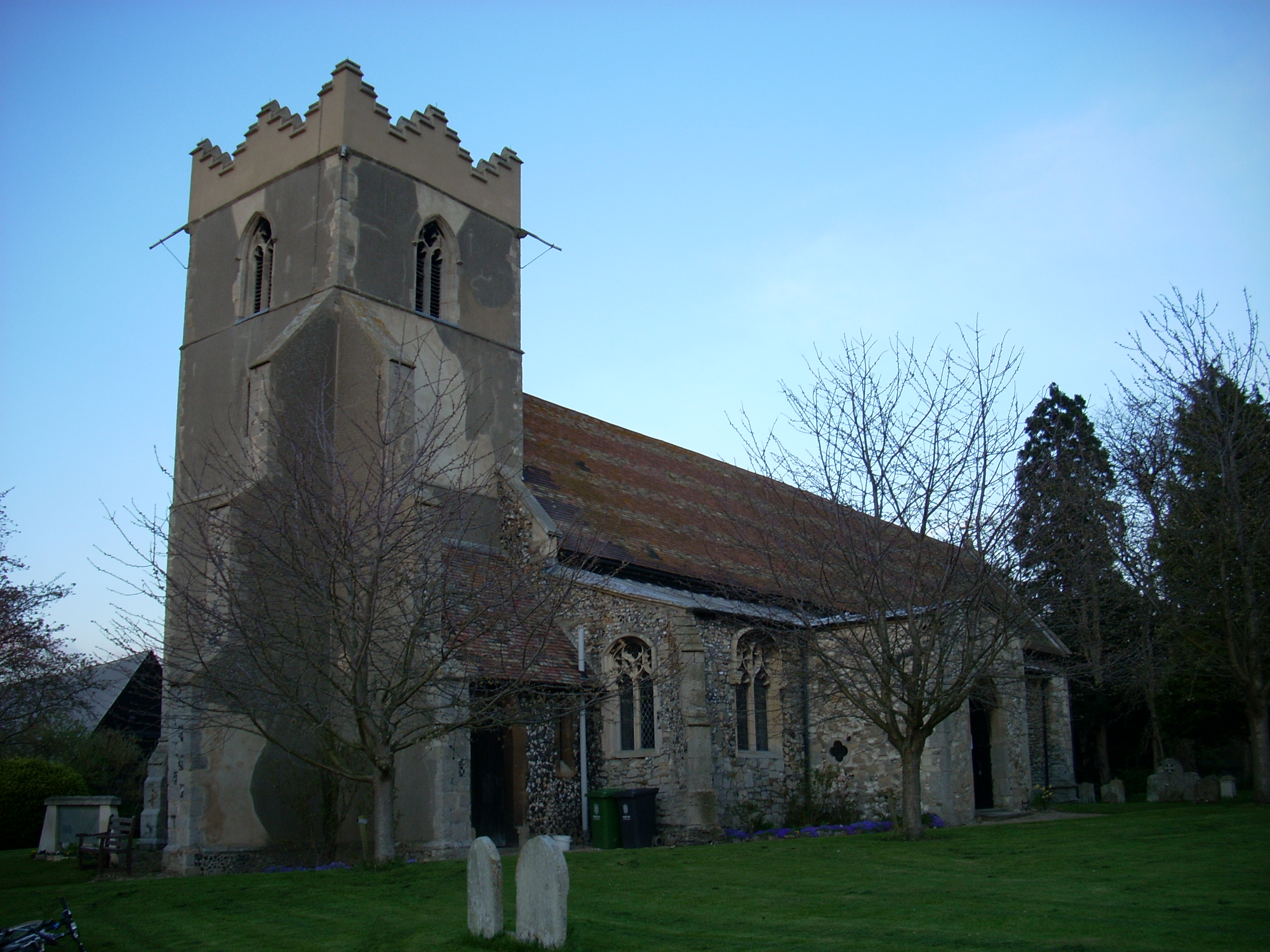
Church of St Peter, Horningsea

The village has been home to a place of worship for well over a thousand years. The Saxons chose the site for a minster in the 9th century, though it was sacked by the invading Danes in the 870s and rebuilt soon after. Only a pair of Saxon coffin lids remain from the original church.

The south arcade remains from the 11th century, the chancel from around 1220, and the building was substantially rebuilt in the 13th and 14th centuries. During this period it was granted to the Hospital of St John in Cambridge, that later became St John's College. It was extensively restored in the early 19th century.

There was substantial restoration work on the church by Thomas Jeckyll during 1865-66.

== Village life ==
Village sign

Horningsea has two pubs (the Plough and Fleece and the Crown and Punchbowl), and the parish church of St Peter. The only retail facility inside the village is a garden centre which also contains a cycle shop.

In September 2012, a community interest company (Horningsea CIC) took over the running of the Plough and Fleece pub which at the time was the only village pub.

There were three public houses in 1764; The Sluice at Clayhithe which catered to the river traffic, closed in around 1830, The Chequers, which probably opened around 1800 and closed in around 1873, and The Crown and Punch Bowl inn which opened in a 17th-century building in around 1764. The Plough and Fleece, occupying a 16th-century building, opened as a pub in the 19th century.

The Millennium Green contains a sculpture called Convexity created by local artist Matthew Sanderson. The Millennium pavilion is also situated here. These were created as part of the Millennium celebrations at the start of 2000.

== Nearby villages ==
- Clayhithe
- Waterbeach
- Milton
- Fen Ditton

== See also ==
- List of places in Cambridgeshire
