= Burwell railway station =

Railway station in Burwell, Cambridgeshire, England

Burwell
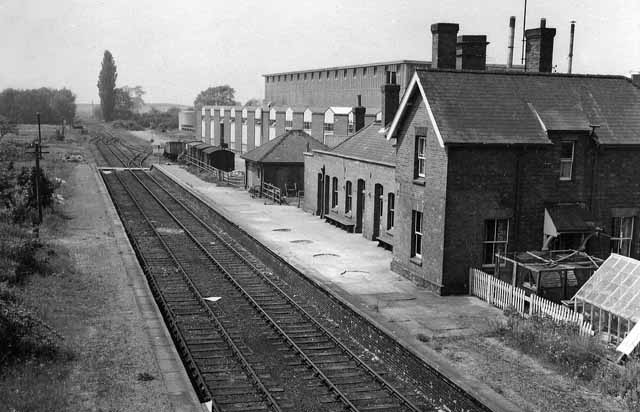
- Burwell station site in 1963

General information
- Location: Burwell, East Cambridgeshire; England
- Coordinates: 52.2665°N 0.3250°E
- Platforms: 2

Other information
- Status: Disused

History
- Pre-grouping: Great Eastern Railway
- Post-grouping: London and North Eastern Railway

Key dates
- 2 June 1884: Opened
- 18 June 1962: Closed to passengers
- 19 April 1965: Closed
Location

Burwell railway station was on the Cambridge and Mildenhall branch of the Great Eastern Railway.

After the closure of the line, the site of Burwell station was redeveloped, initially as a cardboard factory, and then a few decades later as a housing estate. The names of the streets Station Gate and Railway Close hint at the site's past usage.

Former Services

| Preceding station | Disused railways | Following station |
|---|---|---|
| Swaffham Prior | Great Eastern; Cambridge and Mildenhall branch | Exning Road Halt |
