= Isleham railway station =

Former railway station in England

Coordinates: 52.3323°N 0.416°E

Isleham
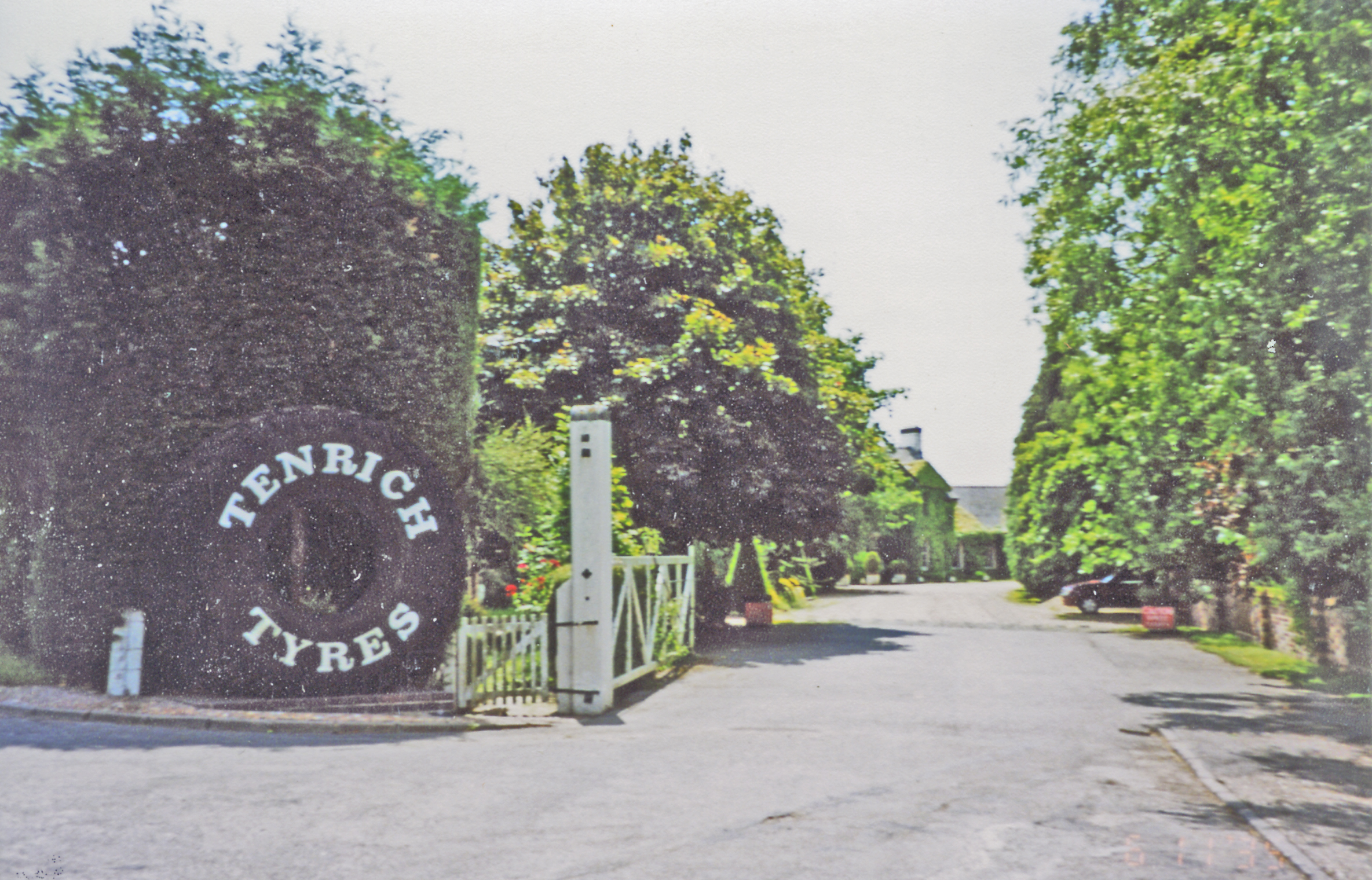
- Site/remains of station

General information
- Location: Isleham, Cambridgeshire; England
- Platforms: 2

Other information
- Status: Disused

History
- Original company: Great Eastern Railway
- Pre-grouping: Great Eastern Railway
- Post-grouping: London and North Eastern Railway

Key dates
- 1 April 1885: Station opened
- 18 June 1962: Station closed for passengers
- 13 July 1964: closed for freight
Location

Isleham railway station is a disused railway station on the Cambridge to Mildenhall railway in England. The station was on the outskirts of the village of Isleham, Cambridgeshire and closed for passengers in 1962 and freight in 1964.

Preceding station	Disused railways	Following station
Fordham; Line and station closed	Great Eastern Railway; Cambridge to Mildenhall railway	Worlington Golf Links Halt; Line and station closed
