= Quy railway station =

Disused railway station in Stow cum Quy, Cambridgeshire

Quy
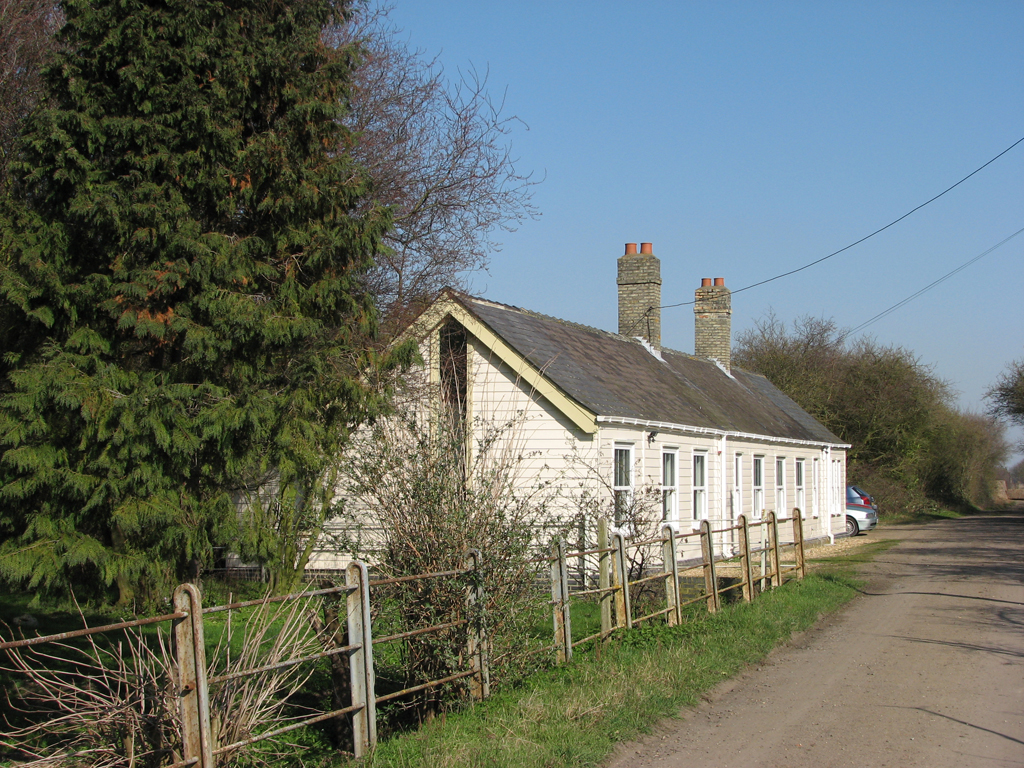

General information
- Location: Stow cum Quy, Cambridgeshire; England
- Coordinates: 52.2327°N 0.2156°E
- Grid reference: TL514617
- Platforms: 1

Other information
- Status: Disused

History
- Original company: GER
- Post-grouping: LNER; British Railways (Eastern Region)

Key dates
- 2 June 1884: Opened
- June 1935: Downgraded to unstaffed halt
- 18 June 1962: Closed to passengers
- 13 July 1964: Closed completely
Location

Quy railway station served the parish of Stow cum Quy, Cambridgeshire, England from 1884 to 1964 on the Cambridge to Mildenhall railway.

== History ==
The station opened on 2 June 1884 by the Great Eastern Railway. It was situated along a road that ran northwest of Station Road. The station had a small goods shed that had a siding that went to behind the west end of the platform. In June 1935 the station was downgraded to an unstaffed halt and the signal box was demolished. It later closed to passengers on 18 June 1962 and to goods on 13 July 1964.

| Preceding station | Disused railways | Following station |
|---|---|---|
| Fen Ditton Halt; Line and station closed | Cambridge to Mildenhall railway | Bottisham and Lode; Line and station closed |
