= Exning Road Halt railway station =

Disused railway station in Exning, West Suffolk

Exning Road Halt

General information
- Location: Exning, West Suffolk; England
- Coordinates: 52.2696°N 0.3417°E
- Grid reference: TL598660
- Platforms: 1

Other information
- Status: Disused

History
- Original company: GER
- Pre-grouping: GER
- Post-grouping: LNER; British Railways (Eastern Region)

Key dates
- 20 November 1922: Opened
- 18 June 1962: Closed
Location

Exning Road Halt railway station served the village of Exning, Suffolk, England from 1922 to 1962 on the Cambridge to Mildenhall railway.

== History ==
The station opened on 20 November 1922 by the Great Eastern Railway. It was situated on the west side of Newmarket Road. Stephenson Siding was between Exning Road Halt and Fordham, which was to the south, and the cement works were to the west. The station closed to both passengers and goods traffic on 18 June 1962.

Preceding station	Disused railways	Following station
Burwell; Line and station closed	Great Eastern Railway; Cambridge to Mildenhall railway	Fordham; Line and station closed
