= Darren Jeffery =

English bass-baritone singer

Darren Lee Jeffery (born 3 April 1976) is an English bass-baritone singer active in opera, concert and oratorio.

== Life and career ==
Jeffery was born in Fordham, Cambridgeshire, and attended King's Ely. He then studied as both an undergraduate and graduate student at the Royal Northern College of Music (RNCM) from 1995 to 2001. During that time he won the RNCM's highest student award, the Curtis Gold Medal. He sang in the chorus of Glyndebourne Festival Opera while still a post-graduate student as well as singing the title role in the college's 2001 production of Verdi's Falstaff. On completion of his studies in Manchester, he joined The Royal Opera's Young Artists Programme in its founding year.

Jeffery made his professional debut as a principal artist as Sciarrone in Puccini's Tosca at the Royal Opera House in 2002. He subsequently appeared with the company in several more roles, including Bottom in A Midsummer Night's Dream, Monterone in Rigoletto, and Masetto in Don Giovanni. He went on to an international career, appearing on the stages of many European opera houses and festivals. In 2008 he was a finalist in the Seattle International Wagner Competition and in 2013 made his US debut as Kothner in Lyric Opera of Chicago's production of Die Meistersinger von Nürnberg. His work as a soloist in oratorio and concert includes several appearances at the BBC Proms—Elijah, Le Rossignol, Les Troyens, The Seven Last Words of Christ, Peter Grimes, and a concert performance of the Glyndebourne production of Billy Budd. From 2017, his career included more Wagnerian roles, including Der Fliegende Holländer and Wotan in Das Rheingold.

== Recordings ==
Jeffery appeared as Pistola on the London Symphony Orchestra recording of Falstaff which won the 2006 Grammy Award for Best Opera Recording. His other recordings include:

- Rossini: Maometto II (title role) – Garsington Opera Orchestra and Chorus; David Parry (conductor). Label: Avie (CD)
- Rossini: La gazza ladra (as Judge) – Philharmonia Orchestra; David Parry (conductor). Label: Chandos Records (CD)
- Donizetti: Belisario (as Centurion) – BBC Symphony Orchestra; Mark Elder (conductor). Label: Opera Rara (CD)
- Britten: Billy Budd (as Lieutenant Ratcliffe) – London Philharmonic Orchestra; Mark Elder (conductor). Label: Glyndebourne Festival Opera (CD and DVD)
- Massenet: Werther (as Johann) – Royal Opera House Orchestra and Chorus; Antonio Pappano (conductor). Label: Deutsche Grammophon (CD)
- Stravinsky: The Rake's Progress (as Trulove) – Théâtre de la Monnaie Orchestra and Chorus; Kazushi Ono (conductor). Label: Opus Arte (DVD)
