= Lode, Cambridgeshire =

Village in Cambridgeshire, England

Coordinates: 52.24°N 0.24°E

Lode
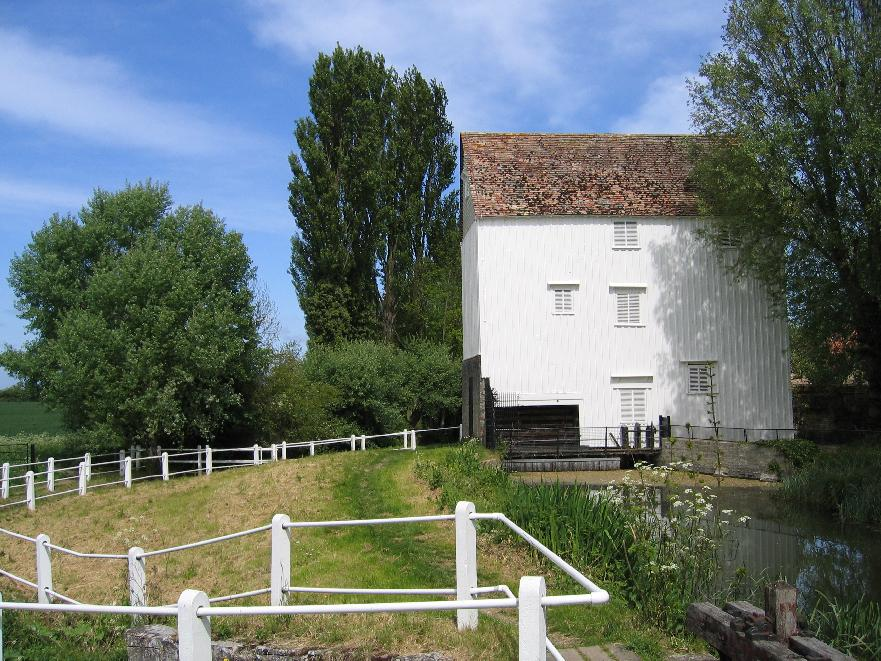
- Lode Mill

- Location within Cambridgeshire
- Population: 913 (Including Long Meadow. 2011)
- OS grid reference: TL529626
- Civil parish: Lode
- District: East Cambridgeshire
- Shire county: Cambridgeshire
- Region: East
- Country: England
- Sovereign state: United Kingdom
- Post town: CAMBRIDGE
- Postcode district: CB25
- Dialling code: 01223
- Police: Cambridgeshire
- Fire: Cambridgeshire
- Ambulance: East of England

Lode is a village and civil parish in the East Cambridgeshire district, in the county of Cambridgeshire, England. It is on the southern edge of The Fens. It lies just north of the B1102 between Quy and Swaffham Bulbeck, 8 miles (13 km) to the north east of Cambridge. In 2011 the parish had a population of 913.

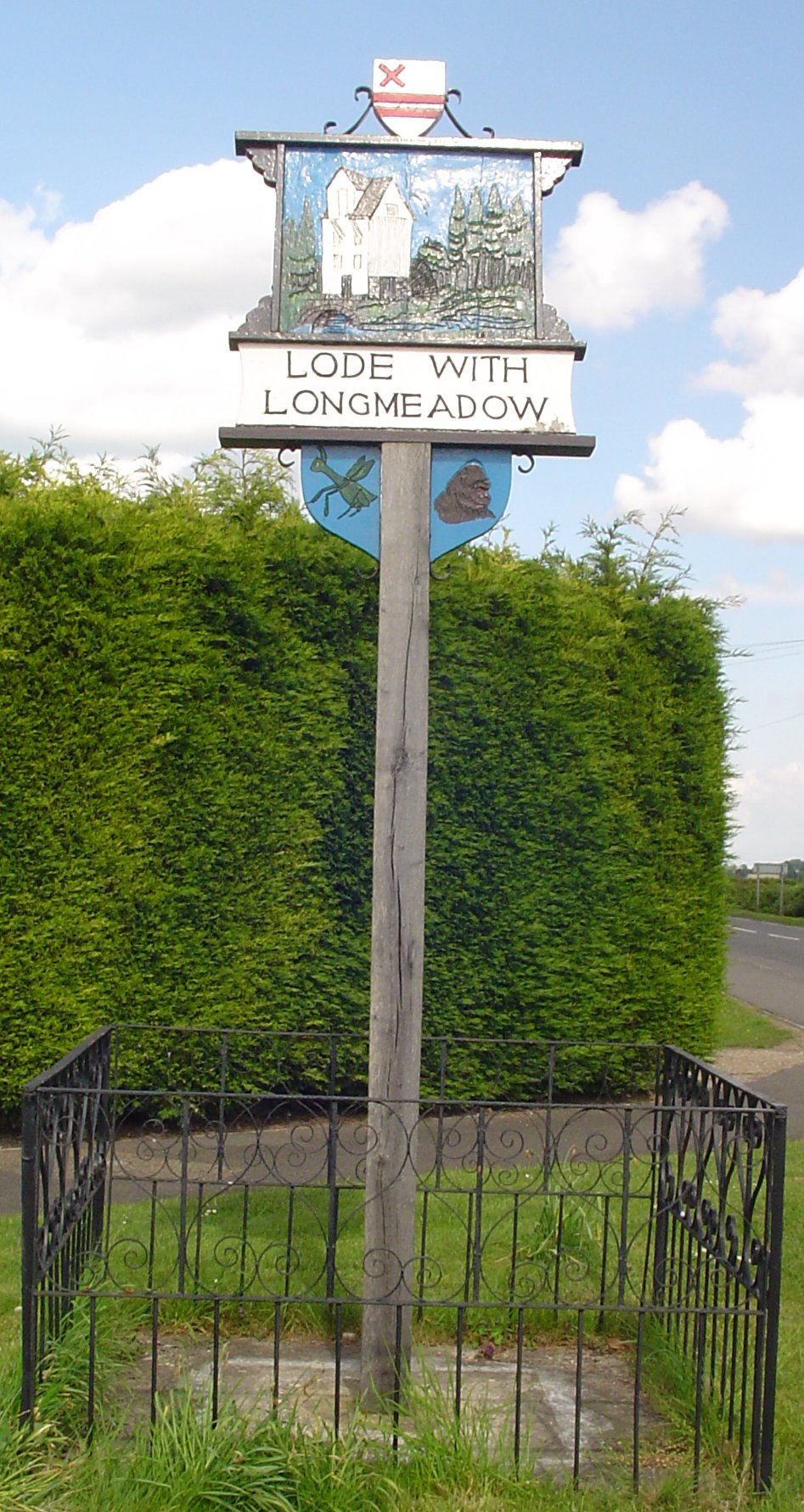
Signpost in Lode

The village's name is derived from its location at the southern end of Bottisham Lode that links it to the River Cam. A lode is an artificial water channel used to drain the Fens, thought to be of Roman origin.

Lode also has the smaller hamlet settlement of Long Meadow as part of the parish to the east along the B1102.

Lode is a comparatively new civil parish, having been separated from Bottisham in 1894.

== Anglesey Abbey ==
Lode is the location of Anglesey Abbey, which was formerly the home of the Fairhaven family, who lived there for many years, but is now the property of the National Trust. The 1st Baron Fairhaven (1896–1966) was responsible for the unique gardens in the grounds of the former 12th-century abbey. Also part of the estate is Lode Mill, a restored watermill that is open to the public.

== Church ==
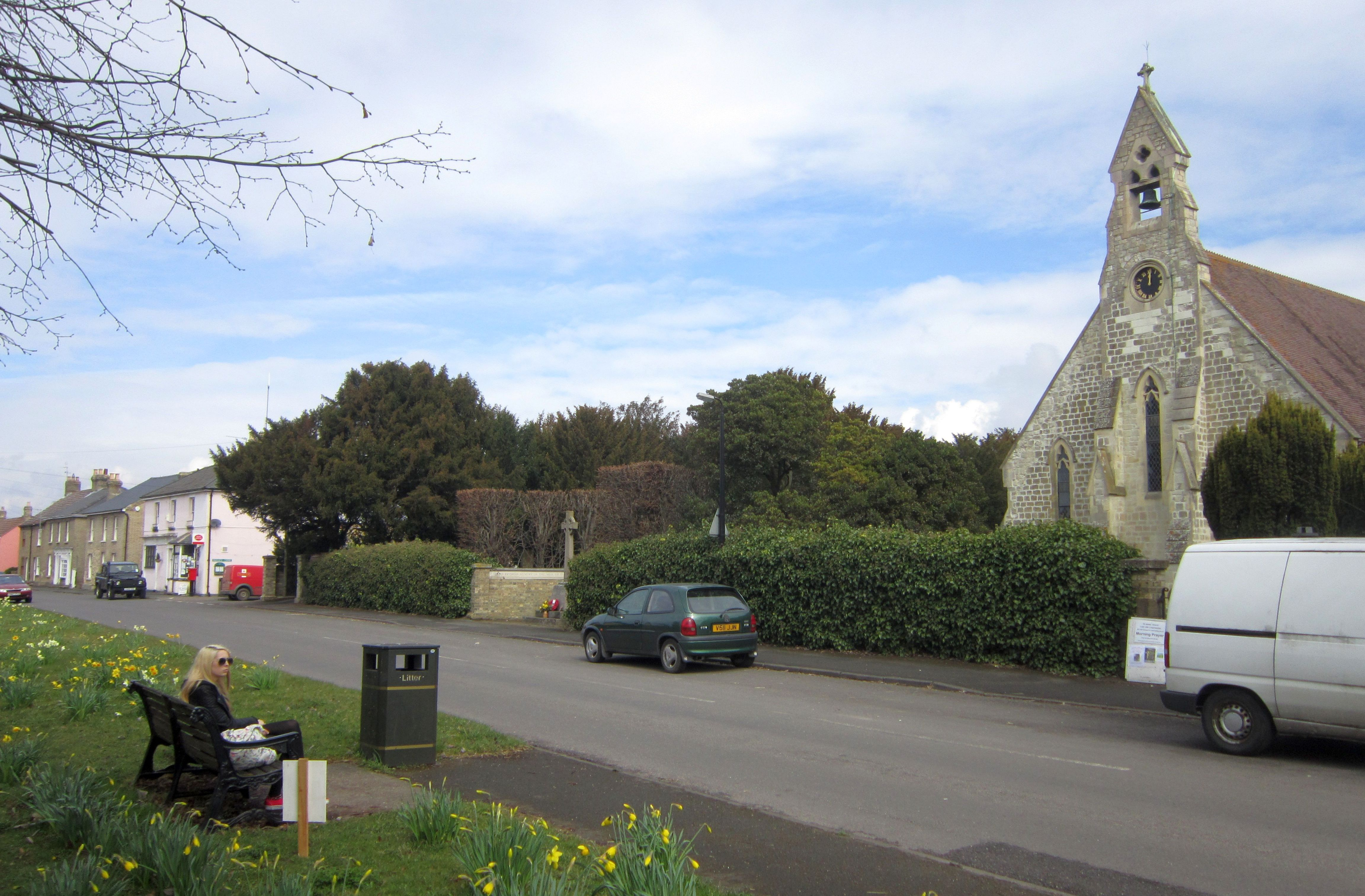
Parish church of St James

In the 19th century, Anglesey Abbey was owned and occupied by Reverend Hailstone, who was also vicar of Bottisham. Convinced that Lode merited its own church, he built the present church of St James, which was dedicated in 1853. The Hailstone family provided a vicar for the following 80 years.

== Village life ==
Children initially attend Bottisham Community Primary school and usually then go on to Bottisham Village College. After this they can go on to one of the many Further Education Sixth form colleges, located in the nearby city of Cambridge.

== Neighbouring villages ==
- Stow-Cum-Quy or just Quy to the West along the B1102 about 2 miles away, which also had an old station like Lode.
- Bottisham, 1 mile to the south.
- Swaffham Bulbeck 2 miles to the east, after which is the sister Village of Swaffham Prior.
- Reach and Burwell follow on from there, completing these group of villages.

== See also ==
- Bottisham and Lode railway station, a disused Railway station at the edge of the village.
