= Worlington Golf Links Halt railway station =

Former railway station in England

Coordinates: 52.3331°N 0.4878°E

Worlington Golf Links Halt

General information
- Location: Worlington, West Suffolk; England
- Platforms: 1

Other information
- Status: Disused

History
- Original company: Great Eastern Railway
- Pre-grouping: Great Eastern Railway
- Post-grouping: London and North Eastern Railway

Key dates
- 20 Nov 1922: Opened as Mildenhall; Golf Links Halt
- 1 Jan 1923: Renamed Worlington; Golf Links Halt
- 18 Jun 1962: Closed
Location

Worlington Golf Links Halt railway station was a railway station on the Cambridge to Mildenhall railway. It served the village of Worlington, Suffolk, England, and closed in 1962.

Preceding station	Disused railways	Following station
Isleham	Cambridge to Mildenhall railway	Mildenhall
