= Brackland Rough =

UK Site of Special Scientific Interest

Coordinates: 52.302°N 0.394°E

- Site of Special Scientific Interest
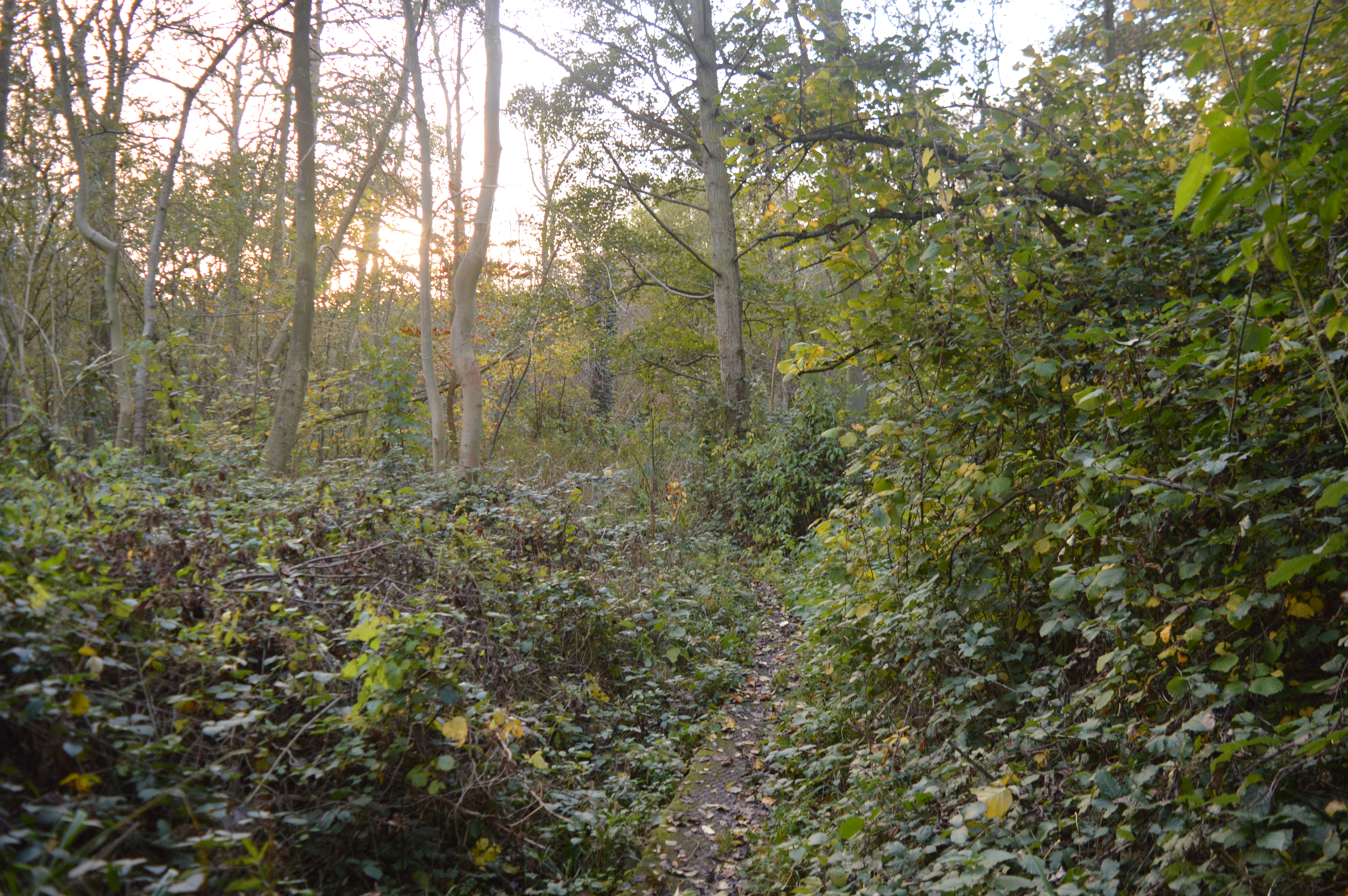
- Location of Brackland Rough.
- Area of search: Cambridgeshire
- Grid reference: TL 633 697
- Interest: Biological
- Area: 10.7 hectares
- Notification date: 1984
- Location map: Magic Map

Brackland Rough is a 10.7-hectare (26-acre) biological Site of Special Scientific Interest in Fordham in Cambridgeshire. It is managed by the Wildlife Trust for Bedfordshire, Cambridgeshire and Northamptonshire as Fordham Woods.

This wet woodland site has semi-natural alder coppice, with ash, crack willow and silver birch. The ground flora has tall fens, together with herbs such as marsh marigold and yellow flag.

There is access by a footpath from River Lane.
