= Fordham Priory =

Gilbertine priory in Cambridgeshire, England

Coordinates: 52.3054°N 0.3865°E

Fordham Priory was a Gilbertine priory in Fordham, Cambridgeshire, England. It was established in 1227 and was dissolved in 1540.

Fordham Abbey, a Grade II listed Georgian manor house was built on the site in the eighteenth century.
