= Fordham railway station =

Former railway station in Cambridgeshire, England

Coordinates: 52.3027°N 0.3718°E

Fordham
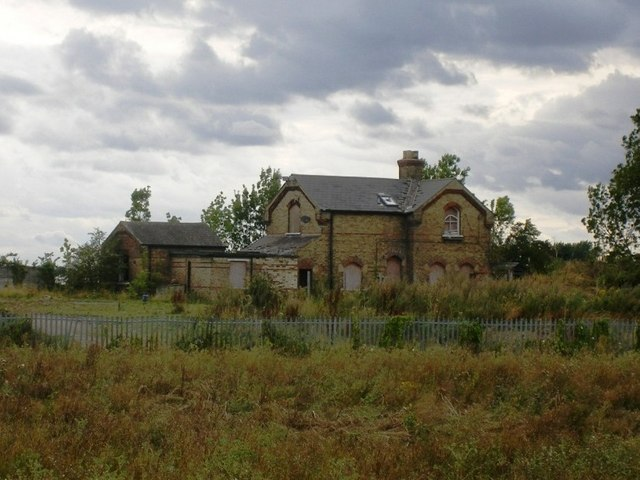
- Fordham railway station in 2008.

General information
- Location: Fordham, Cambridgeshire, East Cambridgeshire; England
- Platforms: 2

Other information
- Status: Disused

History
- Original company: Ely and Newmarket Railway
- Pre-grouping: Great Eastern Railway
- Post-grouping: London and North Eastern Railway

Key dates
- 1 Sep 1879: Opened as Fordham and Burwell
- 2 Jun 1884: Renamed Fordham
- 13 Sep 1965: Closed
Location

Fordham railway station is a disused railway station that served the village of Fordham, Cambridgeshire.

Opened in 1879, the station formed the junction between the Cambridge to Mildenhall railway and the Ipswich to Ely Line in England. The Mildenhall branch closed to passengers in 1962 followed by the station in 1965.

== The site today ==
The yard and buildings were used in turn by a roofing/scaffolding contractor, and as a waste management depot. In March 2009 a planning application was submitted to Cambridgeshire County Council proposing to demolish the station and replace it with a recycling centre.

Trains still pass the site on the Ipswich to Ely Line.

Preceding station	Disused railways	Following station
Exning Road Halt; Station closed	Great Eastern Railway; Cambridge to Mildenhall railway	Isleham; Station closed
Kennett	Ipswich to Ely Line	Soham; Station open
