= Fen Ditton Halt railway station =

Disused railway station in Fen Ditton, Cambridgeshire

Fen Ditton Halt
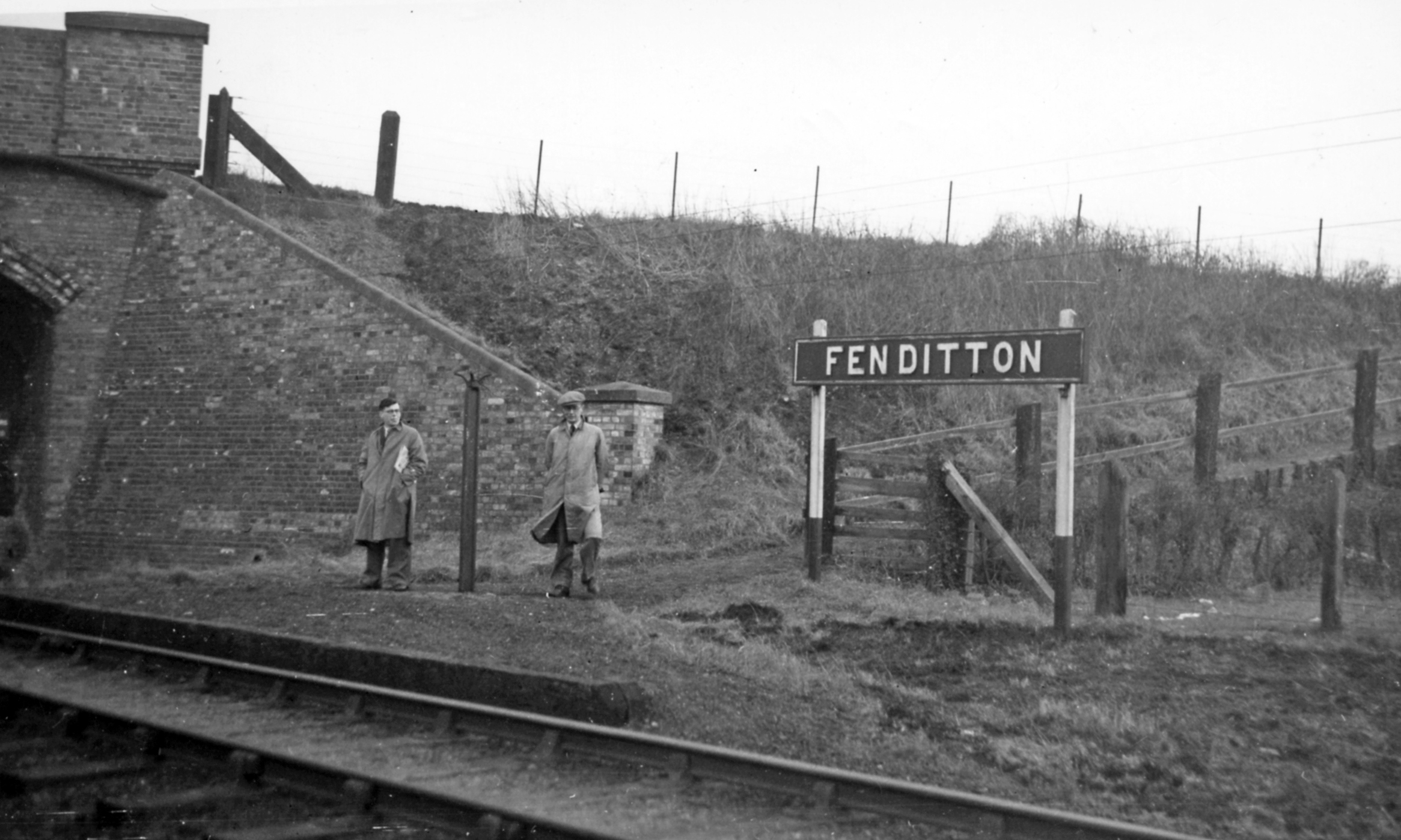
- Fen Ditton Halt, 1938

General information
- Location: Fen Ditton, Cambridgeshire; England
- Coordinates: 52.2174°N 0.1709°E
- Grid reference: TL484599
- Platforms: 1

Other information
- Status: Disused

History
- Original company: GER
- Post-grouping: LNER; British Railways (Eastern Region)

Key dates
- 20 November 1922: Opened
- 18 June 1962: Closed
Location

Fen Ditton Halt railway station served the village of Fen Ditton, Cambridgeshire, England from 1922 to 1962 on the Cambridge to Mildenhall railway.

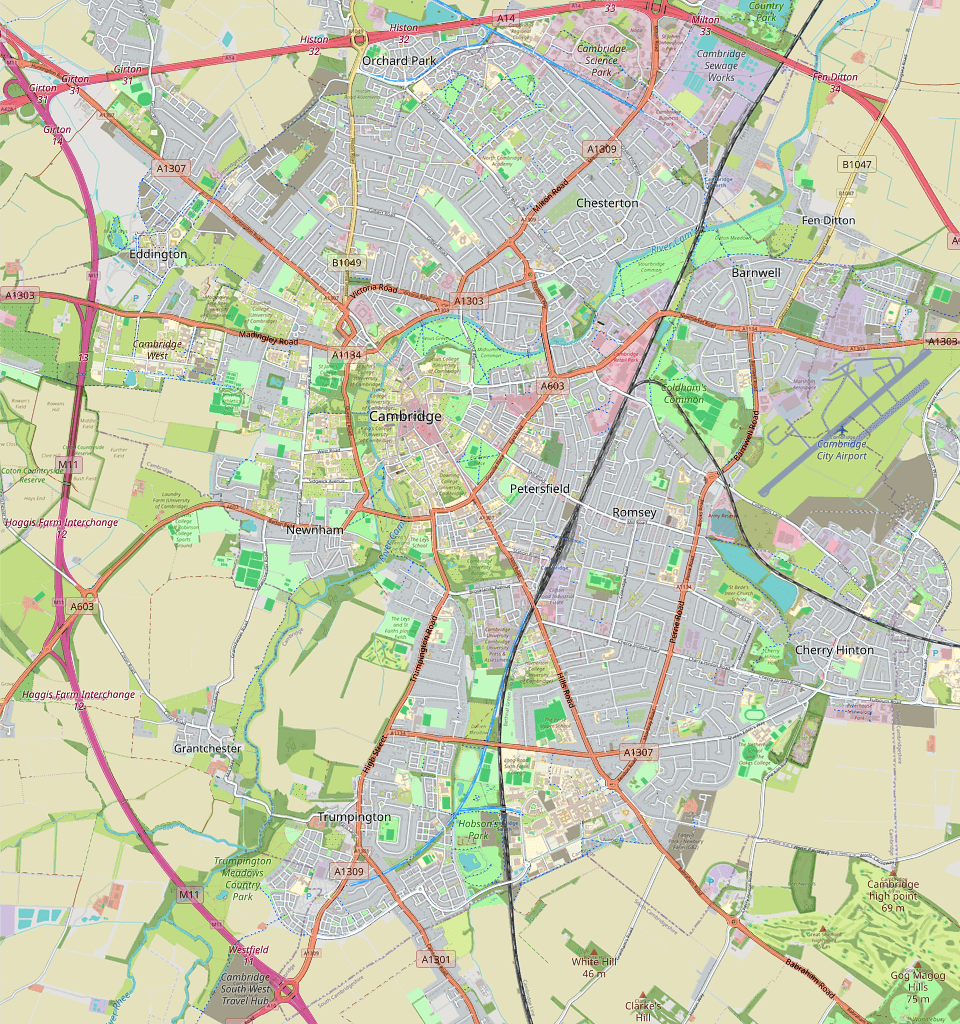
Cambridge railway stations map
(current in bold, closed in italics)

== History ==
The station opened on 20 November 1922 by the Great Eastern Railway. It was situated on the west side of Ditton Lane. The station had oil lamps but in summer these were stored away because no trains ran when it went dark and they were later replaced with Tilley lamps. The station closed on 18 June 1962.

Preceding station	Disused railways	Following station
Barnwell Junction; Line and station closed	Great Eastern Railway; Cambridge to Mildenhall railway	Quy; Line and station closed
