= Stow cum Quy =

Village in Cambridgeshire, England

Coordinates: 52.22308°N 0.22527°E

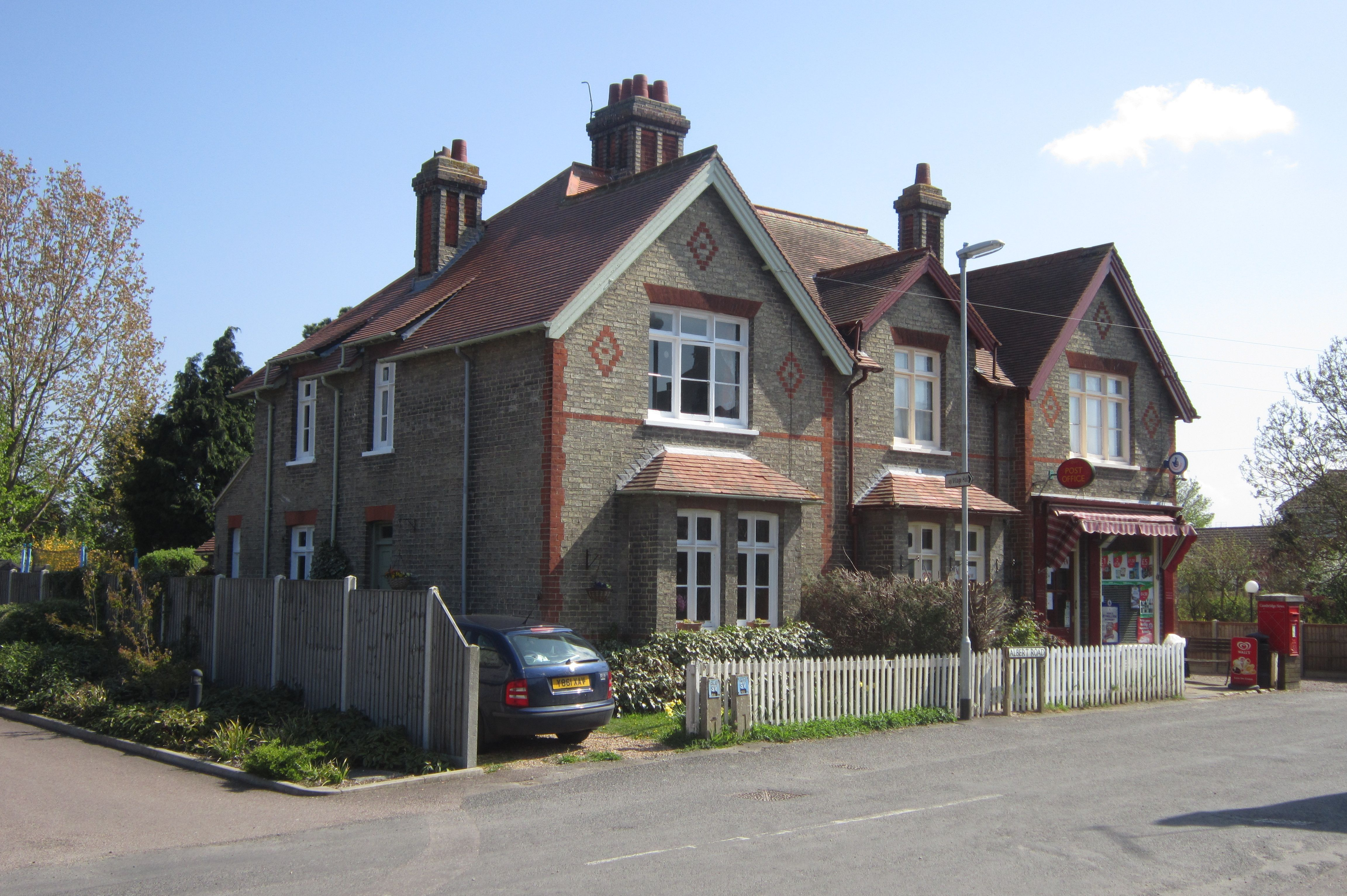
- Main street and Post Office in the village centre

- Location within Cambridgeshire
- Population: 426 (2001); 544 (2011)
- OS grid reference: TL520606
- District: South Cambridgeshire
- Shire county: Cambridgeshire
- Region: East
- Country: England
- Sovereign state: United Kingdom
- Post town: CAMBRIDGE
- Postcode district: CB25
- Dialling code: 01223
- Police: Cambridgeshire
- Fire: Cambridgeshire
- Ambulance: East of England

Stow cum Quy, (/ˌstoʊ kəm ˈkwaɪ/ STOH-kəm-KWEYE) commonly referred to as Quy, is a village and civil parish in Cambridgeshire, England. Situated around 4 miles (6.4 km) north east of Cambridge lying between the Burwell Road (B1102) and the medieval Cambridge to Newmarket road (B1303, formerly A14), it covers an area of 764 hectares (1,890 acres).

== Origin of the name ==
The village's name derives from the joining of two settlements, one called Stow, meaning "high or holy place", that was around the present location of Quy church and Quy coming from Cowey or "Cow Island", the area around the Swan pub. Cum is Latin for "with". It was referred to as "Stowe Quye" in medieval times.

== History ==
The area has been occupied for millennia and Bronze Age remains have been found in the parish. A Roman villa has been found just to the west of Quy Hall. The Saxon Fleam Dyke runs close by the village. The two Saxon settlements of Stow and Quy built up on a raised area at the southern edge of The Fens that ran north all the way to Lincolnshire. The settlements were already joined by 1066, though had separate manors, and became a single ecclesiastical parish by the early 13th century. Stow was the area around the present parish church, and Quy around The Swan public house.

Jeremy Collier (1650–1727), the bishop and theatre critic, was born in the village and has a street named after him. The oldest parts of the parish church of St Mary at Stow End date from the 12th century. The nave and chancel were built around 1340. A Wesleyan chapel was built in 1840 but closed just after the Second World War and was demolished when the Wheatsheaf pub was extended.

== Village life ==
Quy currently supports two public houses. The White Swan, or Swan, a timber-framed house, was open by 1750. The Prince Albert opened in the 1840s on the Newmarket Road and was renamed The Missing Sock after refurbishment in 2010. The Wheatsheaf at Stow End, which opened in the late 19th century, closed in 2019 and was demolished in 2024. Former pubs in the village were The Plough which opened in the late 18th century and was perhaps replaced by The Bush which was open from 1821 to 1904.

The village sign was erected to commemorate the Silver Jubilee of Elizabeth II.

Children initially attend Bottisham Primary School in the nearby village and usually then go on to Bottisham Village College.

Nearby are a number of places of interest including the National Trust property of Anglesey Abbey and Quy Fen, a Site of Special Scientific Interest (SSSI). Another nearby conservation area is Wilbraham Fen and there are several picturesque walks around the village.

The parish church of St Mary's is a Grade II listed building. The nave window dates from the 12th century and the transept chapels from the early 13th century; the chancel and nave arcades, with north and south aisles, were rebuilt in the early 14th century. The west tower dates from the late 14th century and the clerestory from about 1500. Two chancel windows were unblocked in 1665 and in 1739 the east wall of the chancel was rebuilt and the chancel was shortened. The church was restored in about 1885, by W. White (1825-1900) St Mary's, alongside churches in four other neighbouring villages, is a part of the Anglesey Benefice, created in 2003, the vicarage for which is at Bottisham. (Note: The other churches in the benefice are Holy Trinity in Bottisham, St James in Lode with Longmeadow, St Mary's in Swaffham Bulbeck and St Mary's in Swaffham Prior.) Stow has no other places of worship.

== Transport ==
The village is just off the A14 via the Quy interchange and is about two miles from the Newmarket Road Park and Ride. There is a bus service running between Cambridge and Newmarket passing through the neighbouring villages of Bottisham, Lode and Burwell. Cycle access is good, thanks to a number of cycle paths.

Quy railway station, on the Cambridge to Mildenhall Railway, opened in 1884. It closed to passenger traffic in 1962 and to goods in 1964.

== Nearby villages ==
- Teversham

== Gallery ==
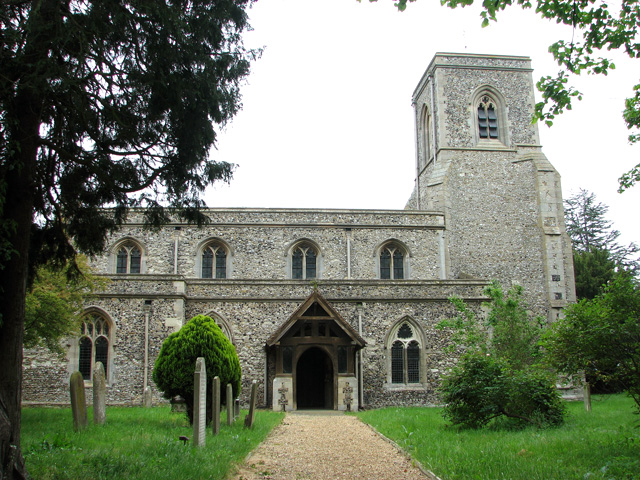
St Mary's church

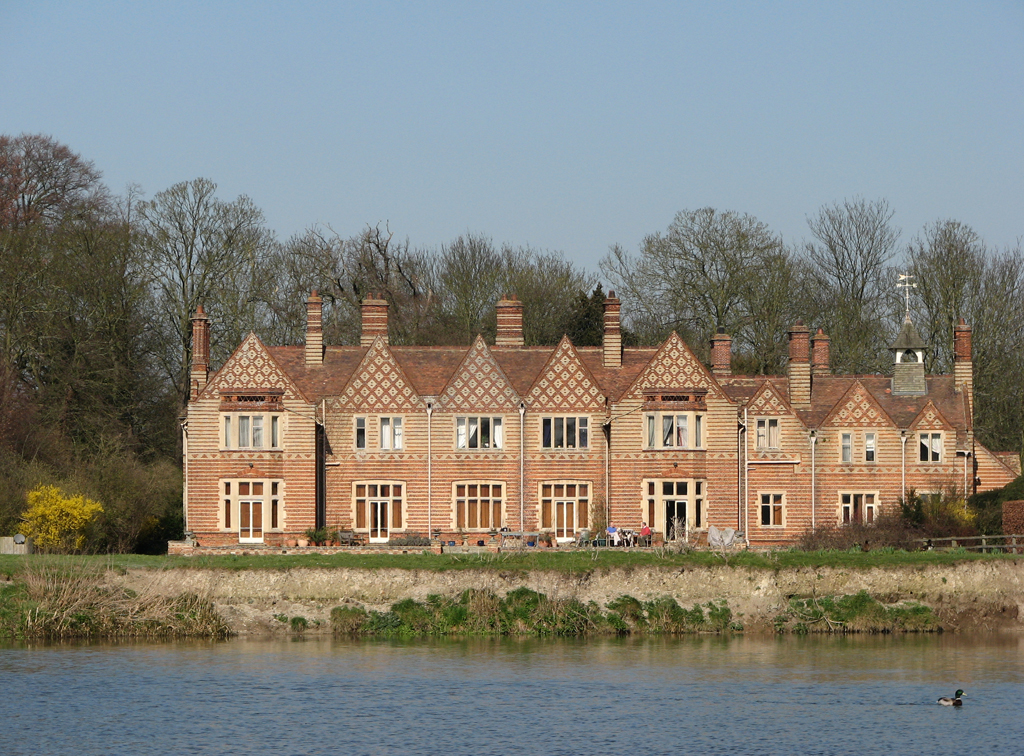
Quy Hall

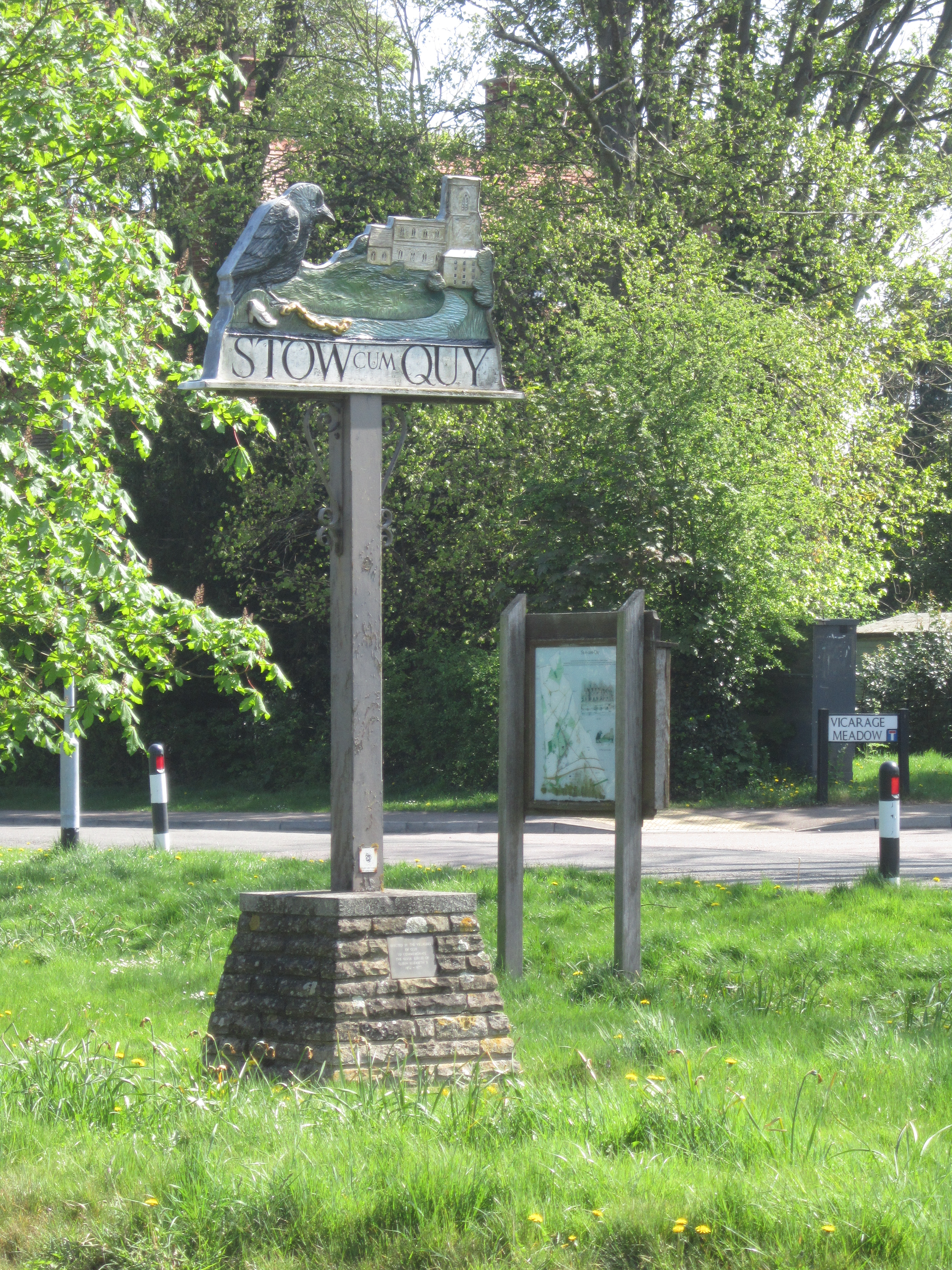
Village sign
