= Fordham, Cambridgeshire =

Village in Cambridgeshire, England

Coordinates: 52.32°N 0.38°E

Fordham
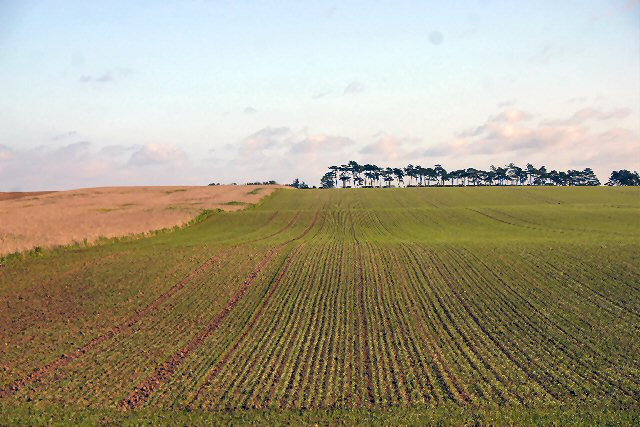
- Fordham Moor

- Location within Cambridgeshire
- Population: 2,712 (2011)
- OS grid reference: TL630708
- Shire county: Cambridgeshire
- Region: East
- Country: England
- Sovereign state: United Kingdom
- Post town: ELY
- Postcode district: CB7
- Dialling code: 01638

Fordham is a village in rural Cambridgeshire, England. Fordham is part of the East Cambridgeshire district. It is four miles north of Newmarket, as well as being close to the settlements of Soham, Burwell, Isleham, Mildenhall and Chippenham.

== History ==
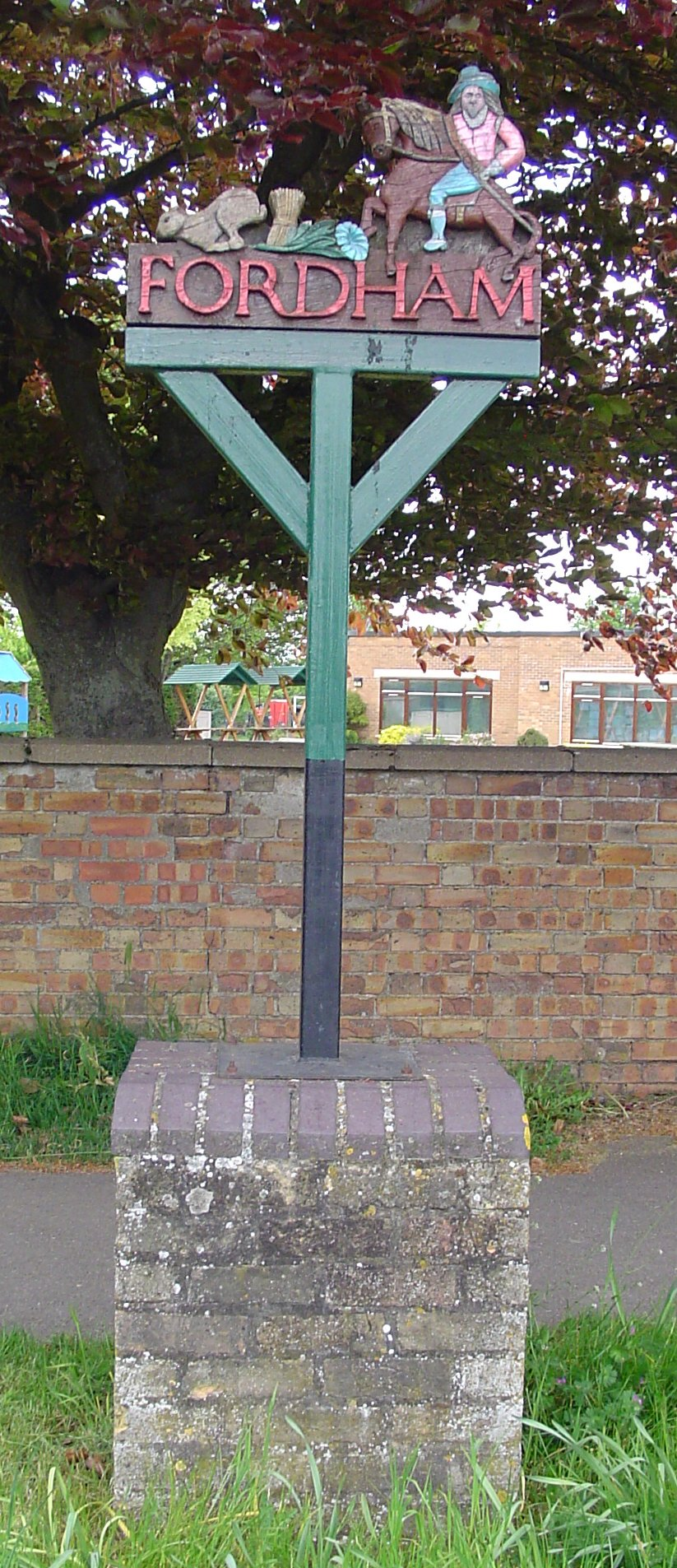
Signpost in Fordham

The parish of Fordham covers 4,331 acres (1,753 ha) in an irregular shape. Its southern border is the county border with Suffolk and most of its south-eastern border with Snailwell follows the path of the River Snail. It also borders Chippenham and Isleham to the east, Soham to the north, and Burwell to the west, as well as having a short boundary with Wicken at its western tip. In 1953 the civil parish was merged with that of Landwade, a tiny parish of only 147 acres (59 ha), although Landwade and its ecclesiastical parish are both in Suffolk.

The parish has been occupied for several thousand years; weapons and tools in both flint and metal have been found from the Early Bronze Age and Iron Age, as well as pottery and burials. Wall plaster and tiles have been found from the Roman era, indicating that villas may have been sited near to Biggin and Block Farms in the 2nd to 4th centuries A.D.

In the Middle Ages the village was home to Fordham Priory, a Gilbertine priory and cell to Sempringham Priory, that was founded in the reign of Henry III in the 13th century by Robert de Fordham. Fordham Abbey, a Grade II listed Georgian manor house was built on the site of the Priory in the eighteenth century.

Fordham had a railway station serving as a junction the Cambridge to Mildenhall railway and the Ipswich to Ely line that opened to the west of the village in 1879. The station finally closed in 1966.

Though spelled Fordeham in the Domesday Book of 1086, the village's spelling has remained unchanged since the 10th century. The name "Fordham" means "homestead or enclosure by a ford".

Fordham War Memorial commemorates the village's dead from the two world wars. It was designed by Sir Edwin Lutyens and originally featured a bronze statue of St George by Sir George Frampton. The memorial was destroyed and the bronze stolen in 1991 and the community raised funds to rebuild it and replace the bronze with a fibreglass replica. It is a Grade II listed building.

== Church ==
The parish church has been dedicated to St Peter since around 1850, prior to which it had been dedicated to St Mary since at least the 14th century. The present building consists of a chancel with side chapels and a two-storeyed north chapel, an aisled and clerestoried nave with south porch and west tower. It is a Grade I listed building.

The earliest parts of the building date from the 12th century, and stonework suggest that by 1200 it was already its present size. The majority of the current structure date from an extensive rebuild in the 13th century. The church is noted for its fine 14th-century north chapel, unusual in having an upper floor and undercroft.

== Village life ==
The village has a Church of England-controlled Primary School which feeds into Soham Village College.

Fordham has a pub, The Chequers which was open by 1760. The Greyhound, which opened in the 1990s, converted into a restaurant called The White Pheasant. Other former pubs include the Green Dragon (previously known as The Bull) on the Market Street green, which was also open by 1760 and closed by the 1960s. The Crown pub became an Indian Restaurant in 2021, which was destroyed by a fire on 14 August 2023.

Fordham Community Archive has been set up to record the history of Fordham in the form of photographs, documents and written and oral memories. The group was formed in August 2007 and holds community events.

== Environment ==
Fordham Woods nature reserve is located south of the village.

== Other details ==
A Ham class minesweeper HMS Fordham is named after the village.

Fordham is the birthplace of operatic bass-baritone Darren Jeffery. In 2007, villager Tracey Barnard was a contestant on Channel 4's Big Brother.
