= Cambridge to Mildenhall railway =

Railway line in United Kingdom

The Cambridge to Mildenhall railway is a closed railway between Cambridge and Mildenhall in England. It was built by the Great Eastern Railway (GER), and opened in two stages, in 1884 and 1885.

Traversing thinly populated agricultural terrain, it was not heavily used. The GER introduced cost-saving measures on passenger trains, including push and pull trains and a conductor-guard system, and in 1922 opened three very basic lineside halts.

The passenger service on the line was discontinued in 1962 and, except for a short stub at Barnwell Junction, the line was closed completely in 1965. There is no railway use of the former route now.

== Before the Mildenhall railway ==
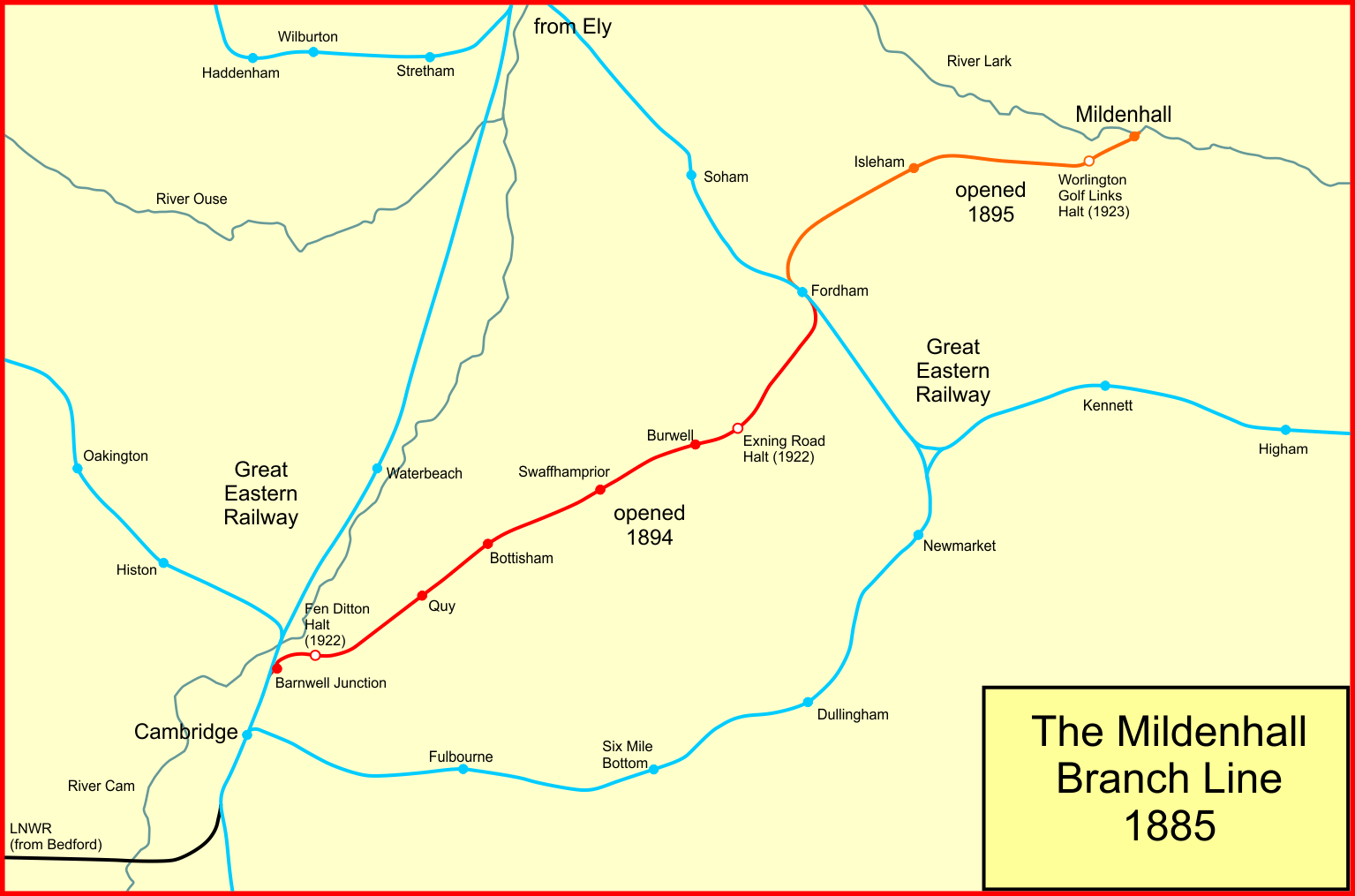
The Cambridge to Mildenhall line in 1895

In the eighteenth and early nineteenth centuries, the area later served by the Mildenhall branch was productive of agricultural produce. The villages to the west of Fordham relied on lodes to connect waterborne transport to the River Great Ouse. Mildenhall itself, lying to the east of Fordham, used the River Lark as its transport artery. There was no satisfactory road network at this time, and the water transport was used universally, although it was slow, and imperfect for the conveyance of food crops.

In the 1840s the easy money of the Railway Mania encouraged numerous railway schemes in the area, and Cambridge was connected to the railway network in 1845 as part of a scheme to link London and Norwich. From July 1862 the Great Eastern Railway was formed, taking over all of the former individual concerns in the area.

At that time there was the main line from Cambridge to Ely and King's Lynn, the old Eastern Counties Railway line from Ely to Norwich, and the former Newmarket Railway lines from Cambridge and Great Chesterford to Bury St Edmunds. The speed and efficiency of the railways enhanced the feeling that Mildenhall, not connected to the network, was at a disadvantage.

In September 1867 Charles Peter Allix of Swaffham Prior prepared a possible railway scheme and submitted it to the Great Eastern Railway, hoping that they would adopt the idea and build the railway, opening up the area in which he was interested, but the GER declined, no doubt believing that the money spent on serving a remote and thinly populated area would be wasted. Moreover, the GER had other priorities for available finance at the time. Following the rebuff, Allix tried to interest the London and North Western Railway, who were running to Cambridge via Bedford, but they too declined.

== A viable scheme at last ==
In 1878 the GER suffered from exceptional flooding near Lakenheath, which blocked its line between Ely and Norwich for a period. The Ely to Norwich line was of strategic importance to the GER at the time; moreover it was developing its network in the area, and had encouraged the nominally independent Ely and Newmarket Railway to build between those points, forming a triangular junction east of Newmarket station on the Bury St Edmunds line. (The Ely and Newmarket Railway opened in 1879.)

Allix had remained in contact with the GER concerning his scheme, and it now appeared that a line from Cambridge through Mildenhall might be advantageous; if extended east to Thetford it might provide a shortened route between Cambridge and Norwich, avoiding the northward sweep through Ely.

In 1880 the GER Board were told, "We have suffered and shall suffer again from floods stopping traffic on the main line at Lakenheath. The local parties have repaired the former damage with silt only and it will give way again... Altogether the flooding has cost the company £40,000." The line was built to Mildenhall, but proper repairs to the flood-prone section proved effective, and the new branch progressed no further.

The Great Eastern was persuaded, and the scheme was included (with other works) in the Parliamentary Bill which became the Great Eastern Railway Act, 1881, which received the Royal Assent on 18 July. The line was to run north-eastwards from a junction at Barnwell, two miles north of Cambridge station, and run to Fordham, and make a junction there with the now-completed Ely – Newmarket line; from the northern end of Fordham, the line was to run eastwards to Mildenhall. The station there was to be laid out to facilitate the intended eastward extension to Thetford later. (This was not in fact built.)

== Construction and opening ==
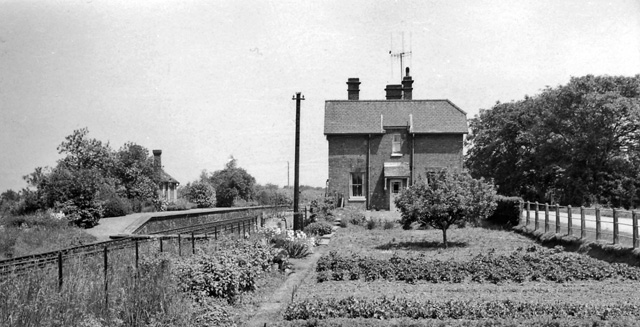
Bottisham & Lode station in 1963

Tenders for the construction were awarded, in the amount of £45,494 for the Barnwell to Fordham section, and £30,833 for the Fordham to Mildenhall section. The contractor was Henry Lovatt of Wolverhampton. The first sod was cut on 3 January 1883.

The line was nearly complete between Barnwell and Fordham in May 1884 and officers of the Great Eastern Railway were conducting a tour of their line; on 26 or 27 May 1884 they traversed the line by special inspection train. On 28 May 1884 Major General C S Hutchinson, an Inspecting Officer of the Board of Trade, carried out an inspection of the line; although certain signal interlocking changes were required, he approved the line for opening, and it did so on 2 June 1884 for all traffic. During the luncheon provided for Hutchinson's inspection, Henry Lovatt foresaw that the line would soon be extended to Mildenhall and on to Thetford.

The construction had cost £52,574.

Four trains were provided each weekday, calling at Barnwell Junction, Quy, Bottisham, Swaffham Prior and Burwell.

On 28 March 1885 Hutchinson again visited the line, to inspect the Mildenhall extension from Fordham. The line was satisfactory, and that opened to traffic on 1 April 1885.

== In operation ==
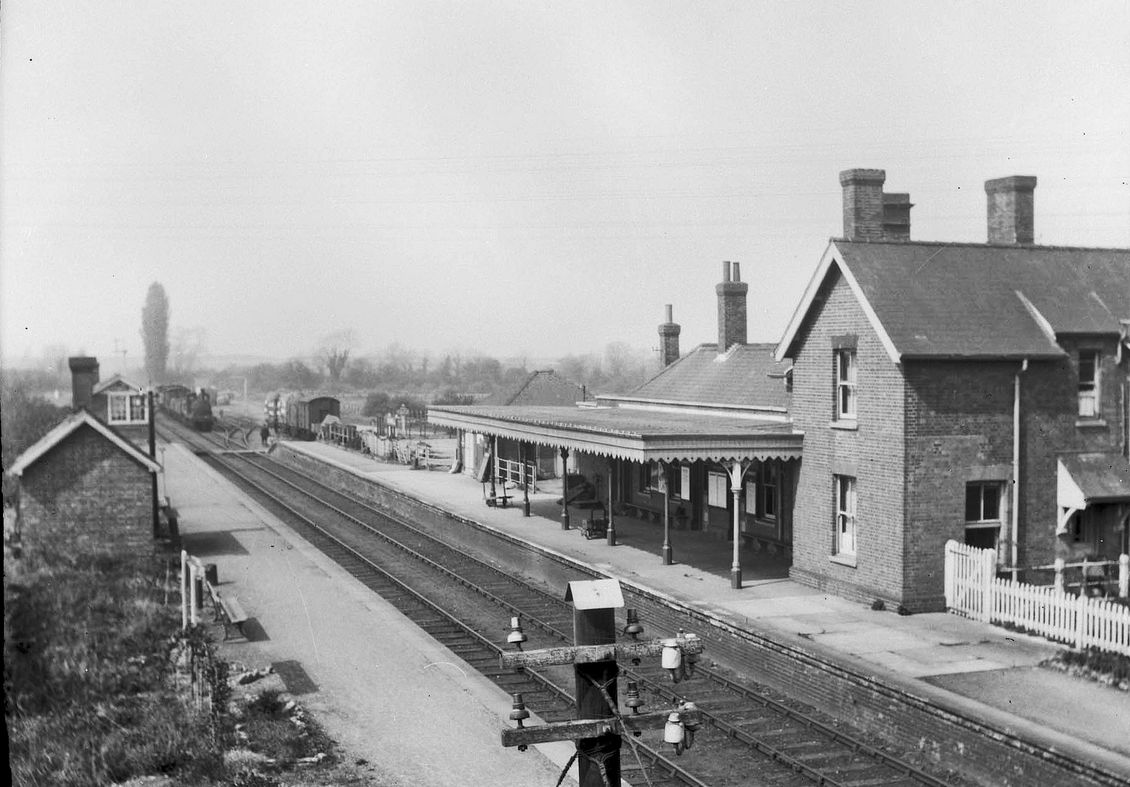
Burwell station, probably in 1905

Now there were five passenger trains daily throughout, but four on Thursdays, and two round trips in addition between Mildenhall and Fordham. There was an intermediate station on the extension at Isleham. The extension had cost £36,507, and the entire line was a little under 21 miles in length.

All passenger trains were required to stop at all stations; the line was worked on the train staff and ticket system.

Passenger traffic was slow to develop; 10,000 passenger journeys from Mildenhall were made in 1890; the line earned £6 per mile per week.

== Train service improvements ==
On 5 October 1914 a somewhat enhanced train service was introduced as part of wider improvements on the GER: an additional run each way was put on. The first and last trains out from Cambridge to Mildenhall had been 9:52 and 19:00, and were now 07:05 and 19:33, with inward arrivals there, formerly 08:20 and 17:35 now expanded to 08:02 and 20:30.

== Motor train operation ==
The new passenger service on the line adopted push and pull working, using a class Y65 2-4-2T locomotive no 1311. The Railway Magazine described the system:

A motor train has now been placed in service between Cambridge and Mildenhall...

The engine employed is one of the smaller 2-4-2 tank engines of the 1300 class, introduced for branch traffic two or three years ago, with a boiler pressure of 160 lb per sq in... Coupled to the engine is a corridor composite carriage seating nine first and 30 third class passengers... To this is attached a driving car which is a... third class carriage seating 46 passengers... The end compartment of this coach is set apart for the driver and guard. A gangway connection is provided between the two vehicles.

The train is operated by the driver either from the engine footplate or from the compartment at the other end of the train, according to the direction of travel. In the driver's compartment are placed the necessary fittings to give him complete control of the train, These fittings consist of a driver's brake valve and air pressure gauges for operating the Westinghouse brake, a cord connected to the whistle on the engine, an electric bell operated from the footplate, a bell push for communication by bell code with the fireman, and an air valve controlling the movements of the steam regulator on the engine.

When the engine was not leading, the regulator on the engine could be operated by a lever worked by compressed air; when the engine was leading, the control lever could be disconnected, allowing the regulator to be controlled by hand in the ordinary way.

The fireman has the care of all work required on the engine footplate but the driver can, by an electric bell and a series of code rings, convey certain instructions to him, such as "Apply the brake" or "Shut the regulator".

However the trial of push and pull working here, and later on the GER Ramsey Branch, was not successful, due to the inability of the unit to handle peak passenger loading, or to deal with mixed trains. During World War I the Lower Edmonton to Cheshunt line was reopened to passenger traffic, and the push and pull unit was transferred there; it may be that the less rural character of the service was more suited to the trains.

== Conductor-guards ==
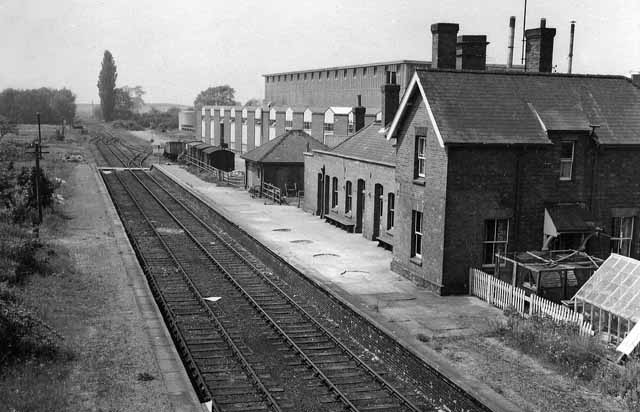
Burwell Station in 1963

Following World War I there were a series of strikes in the railway industry, the coal mines, and generally they impaired the line's effectiveness, encouraging adoption of alternatives. At the same time road transport was beginning to be practicable, and from 1921 a road motor service was introduced, becoming an omnibus operation in 1922.

In that year the GER introduced the conductor-guard system on the line. The train guard issued tickets; the coaching stock was modified with a crude drop plate to enable the guard to move from one coach to another.

This system encouraged the thought of providing low-cost stopping places without station facilities; retractable steps would be provided on the coaches to enable passengers to climb in and out. The "platform" was simply a short area of levelled clinker at rail level, on the up side of the line in each case. The idea was considered feasible, and was implemented from 20 November 1922, when Fen Ditton, Exning Road, and Mildenhall Golf Links halts were opened. (The last named was renamed shown Worlington Golf Links Halt from 1 January 1923.)

The Railway Magazine described the process; the provision of halts with short platforms had generated additional traffic as well as improving the railway's competitive position.

Developing this principle the Great Eastern then introduced a new type of "Halt", the cost of which is reduced to a minimum, in conjunction with special equipment of rolling stock of a very inexpensive character.

On November 20 1922, three of these new "halts" were brought into use on the Cambridge and Mildenhall branch, known as Fen Ditton, Exning Road, and Worlington Golf Links [actually "Mildenhall Golf Links" for a short initial period]. These are located at road crossings [that is, bridges], a short space alongside the line being cleared to form a "landing", but without raised platforms, and with a path to the public road. These are all on the same side of the line, and the branch set of vehicles, operated on the conductor-guard principle, has one vehicle with a set of steps of special design,, adapted to be moved forward for use or inwards clear of platforms &c. when not required. The vehicle so fitted is labelled to indicate that "halt" passengers must travel in it, and is adapted for intercommunication between the compartments. Central corridor vehicles with a connecting gangway for the use of the conductor-guard have been introduced.

The third vehicle is also for third class passengers, and is semi-open in three sections, the centre door being fitted, where used, for serving the new "halts", with steps on one side as already described above. The remainder of this vehicle provides guard's and brake accommodation. The vehicles of each set are connected by simple gangways, with protecting rails, intended for the use of the guard only, to enable him to proceed through the train and issue tickets. Further vehicles are of course, added when necessary, and when required luggage, milk or other vans can be attached. As newly adapted and upholstered, the accommodation is quite up to modern standards.

== Tender engines ==
Initially it was assumed that tank engines would operate the branch line, but it was found more practical to use small tender engines, partly due to the lack of water facilities intermediately between Cambridge and Fordham. There was a 50-feet turntable at Mildenhall. In later years the E4 2-4-0 locomotives were in general use of passenger trains, and J15 0-6-0s on goods trains. The line was said to be the "last haunt" of the E4 locomotives.

== Diesel trains ==
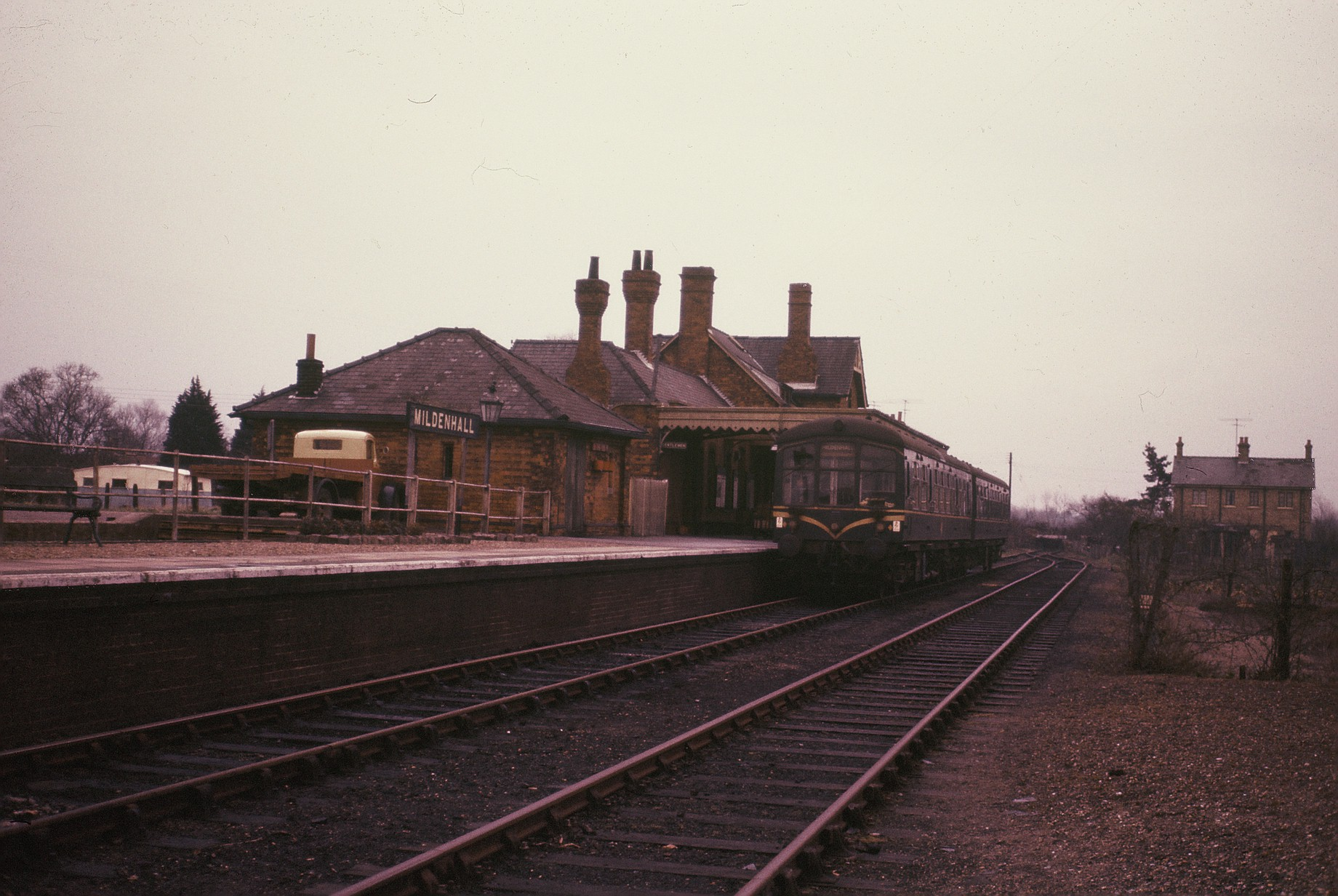
Mildenhall station with diesel train in 1962

In 1956 diesel multiple units were introduced and operated some services on the branch; however their reliability was not always good, and it was not until 1958 that their general adoption took place. From 7 July 1958 diesel railbuses seating 54 supplied by Waggon-und Maschinenbau GmbH Donauwörth were brought into use on the line. Some of the trains ran via Newmarket from the mid-1950s and indeed public timetables at the time of proposed closure show only one weekday train running through via Quy.

Nonetheless, by 1957 the financial situation of the line was serious: Mildenhall issued 77 tickets per week in 1957, with takings of £27.

== Closure ==
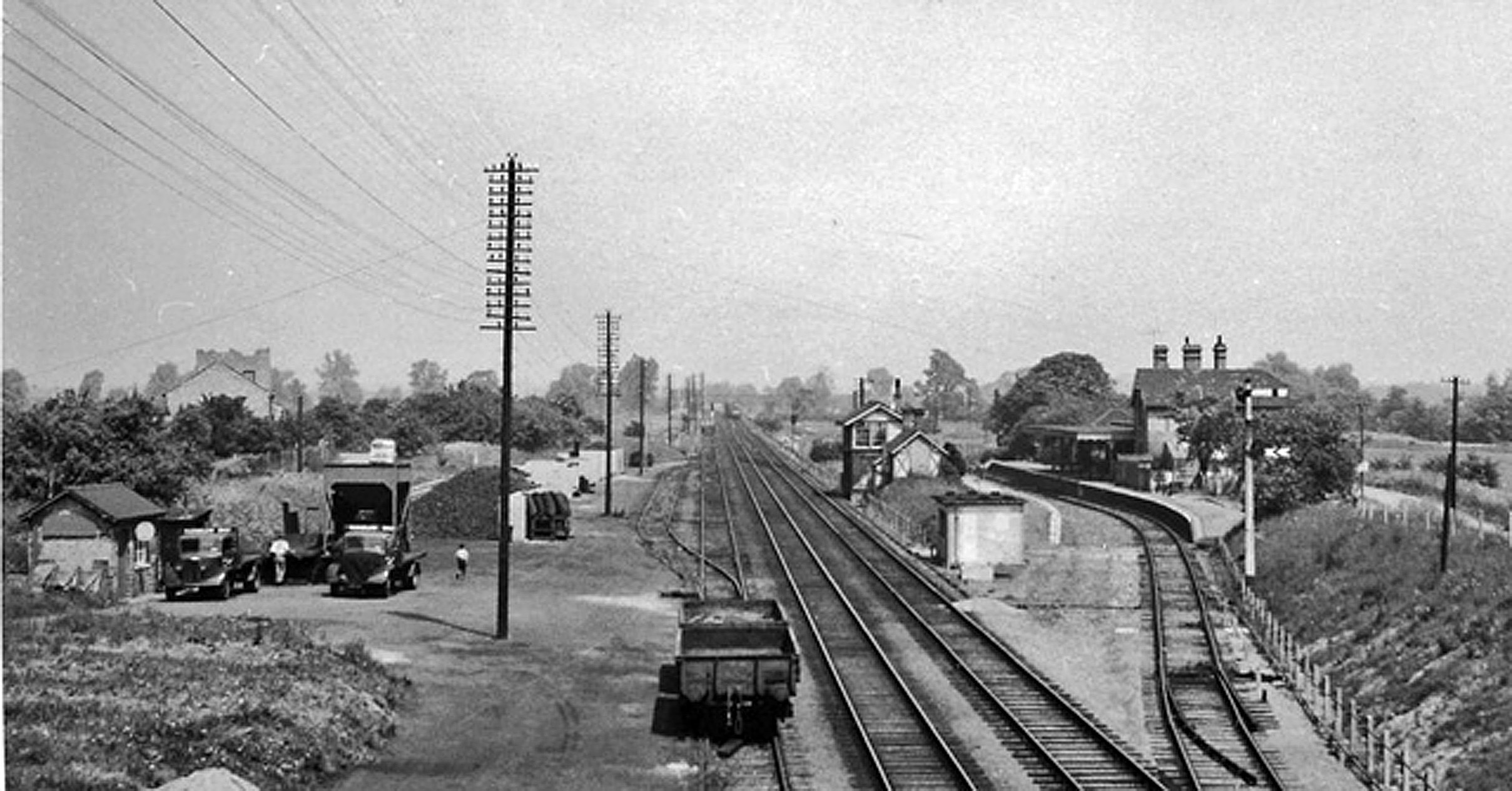
Barnwell Junction railway station in 1963

In 1961 formal closure proceedings were initiated; members of the Transport Users Consultative Committee travelled from Cambridge to Mildenhall by special train, but returned by road. A formal public hearing into hardship was conducted, but approval was given for closure to passenger trains, and the last train ran on 16 June 1962.

A goods train service continued, running from Cambridge to Mildenhall via Newmarket, and back via Quy; outside the sugar beet season this conveyed mainly domestic coal and coke. This too was hardly commercially viable in the face of modern road competition, and the final through goods service operated on 10 July 1964. A private siding for oil traffic remained at Barnwell Junction, and the branch from Fordham to Burwell was retained, but the remainder closed entirely. The Burwell terminal was expected mainly to handle traffic in connection with Corrugated Fittings Ltd, but that traffic was disappointing, and the Burwell stub too closed from 19 April 1965.

The Barnwell Junction oil terminal was later operated by BP, and it too ceased to be used after the first months of 1994, although the track access remained in situ for some considerable time.

Fordham station remained in use, served by trains on the Ely to Newmarket line, but that too was extremely thin, and on some days no passengers used the station. Fordham station was closed to passengers from 13 September 1965.

== Station list ==
The line opened from Barnwell Junction to Fordham on 2 June 1884 and from Fordham to Mildenhall on 1 April 1885. Passenger services ceased on 18 June 1962.

- Barnwell Junction; although the station was alongside the main line, there were platforms on the branch only;
- Fen Ditton Halt; opened 20 November 1922
- Quy;
- Bottisham; renamed Bottisham & Lode 1897;
- Swaffham Prior;
- Burwell;
- Exning Road Halt; opened 20 November 1922;
- Fordham; station on Ely to Newmarket line; it had opened as Fordham & Burwell on 1 September 1879 and was renamed Fordham on the opening of the branch; closed 13 September 1965;
- Isleham;
- Mildenhall Golf Links Halt; opened 20 November 1922; renamed Worlington Golf Links Halt 1923;
- Mildenhall (Note: Shippea Hill station was named Mildenhall before the opening of the Mildenhall branch line.)
