= Langhorne =

Langhorne may refer to:

== Places ==
- Langhorne Borough, Pennsylvania
  - Langhorne Speedway
  - Langhorne (SEPTA station)
- Langhorne Manor, Pennsylvania, borough in Bucks County, Pennsylvania
- Langhorne Creek, South Australia

== People ==
Given name

- Langhorne Bond (1937–2022), U.S. federal administrator
- Langhorne Slim (born 1980), American country singer
- Langhorne Wister (1834–1891), American military officer

Surname

- Bruce Langhorne (1938–2017), American folk musician
- Cary DeVall Langhorne (1873–1948), American Medal of Honor recipient
- Crystal Langhorne (born 1986), American basketball player
- Francis Harold Langhorne (1892–1918), Lieutenant in the 2nd Canadian Mounted Rifles killed in action at Cambrai
- Harold Stephen Langhorne (1866–1932), Brigadier-General in the British Army in the First World War
- James Archibald Dunboyne Langhorne (1878–1950), Brigadier in the British Army
- Jeremiah Langhorne (died 1742), prominent landowner and jurist in colonial Pennsylvania
- John Langhorne (poet) (1735–1779), English poet and clergyman
- John Langhorne (1805–1881), mathematics master of Giggleswick School
- John Langhorne (1862–1925), master of Loretto School and headmaster of the Dean Orphanage Charity School later known as the John Watson's Institution in Edinburgh
- Reverend John Langhorne (1836–1911), master of Tonbridge School and headmaster of The King's School, Rochester
- Michael Langhorne Astor (1916–1980), British politician
- Nancy Witcher Langhorne, bka Nancy Astor (1879–1964), American-born first woman British MP
- Reggie Langhorne (born 1963), American football player
- Samuel Langhorne Clemens (1835–1910), author, pen name Mark Twain
- Reverend Thomas Langhorne (born 1797), founder of Loretto School
- Sir William Langhorne, 1st Baronet (c. 1631–1715), merchant, landowner and Governor of Madras
