= Wale (surname) =

Wale is an English surname. Notable people with the surname include:

- Charles Wale (1765–1845), English general
- Gregory Wale (1668–1739), English gentleman
- Henry John Wale (1827–1892), English author, soldier, and church minister
- Matthew Wale (born 1968), Solomon Islander politician
- Samuel Wale (1721–1786), English painter and book illustrator
- Thomas Wale (1701–1796), English gentleman
- Thomas Wale (1303–1352), English soldier
