= King's School, Rochester =

Private school in Rochester, Kent, England

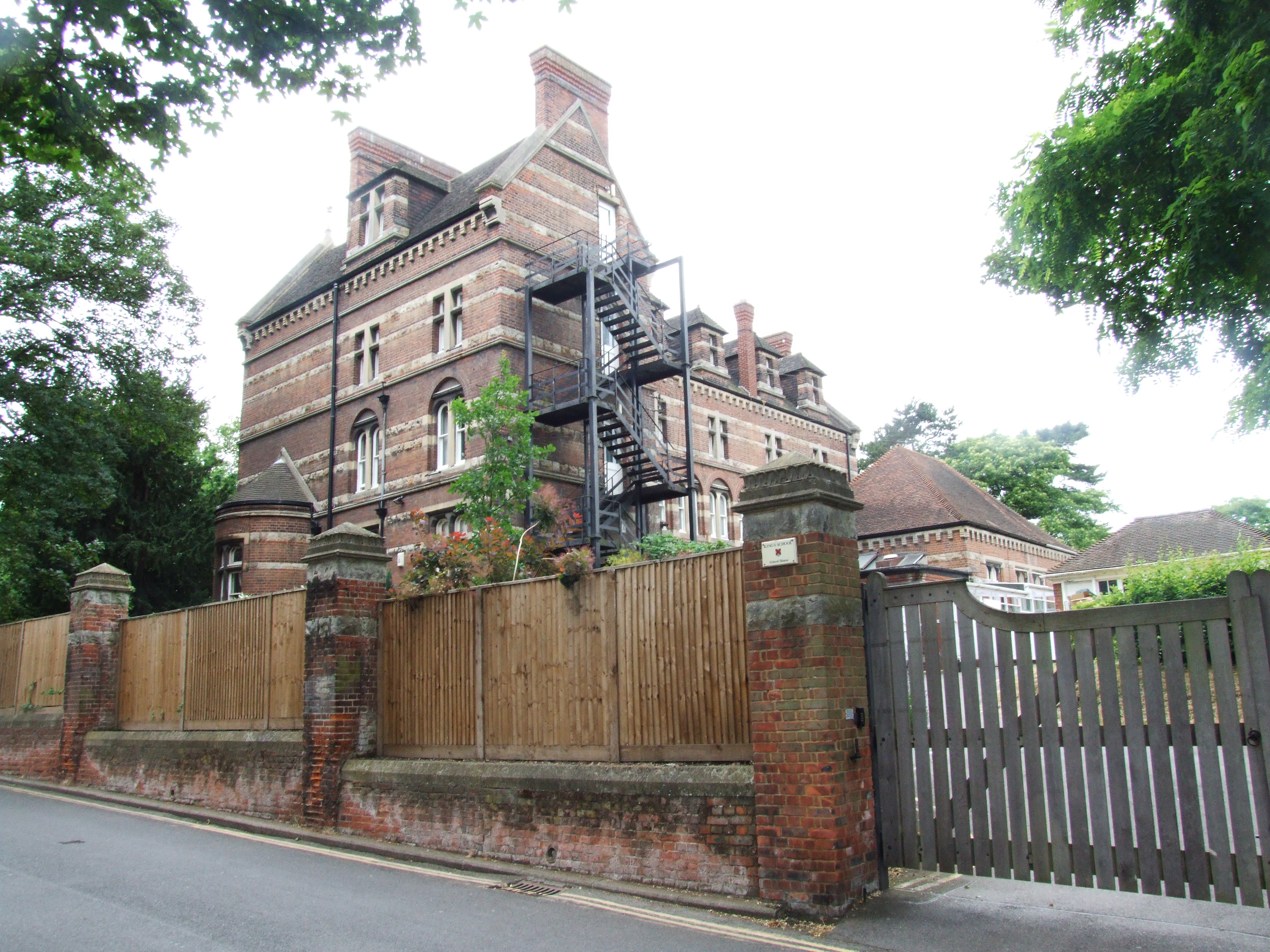
- A view of King's School, Rochester

Location
- Boley Hill; Rochester, Kent, ME1 1TE; England; 51°23′15″N 0°30′06″E

Information
- Type: Cathedral school Private day and boarding school
- Mottoes: Disce aut discede (Translation: Learn or Depart) "Work hard, Play hard, Look after each other"
- Religious affiliation: Church of England
- Established: 604 AD
- Founder: (refounded) Henry VIII
- Chairman of the Governors: Air Commodore (ret'd) John Maas CBE
- Principal: Simon Fisher
- Chaplain: Reverend Stephen Padfield
- Years taught: Nursery – U6th
- Gender: Coeducational
- Age: 3 to 18
- Enrolment: 700
- Houses: 4
- Colours: Blue, black and white
- Alumni: Old Roffensians
- School Song: "Carmen Roffense"
- Website: www.kings-rochester.co.uk

King's School, Rochester, is a private co-educational all through day and boarding school in Rochester, Kent. It is a cathedral school and is part of the foundation of Rochester Cathedral. The school claims to be the second oldest continuously operating school in the world, having been founded in 604 AD. (Note: Shishi Middle School in China claims a foundation c. 142 BC but this is disputed owing to a gap in its functioning. King's School, Canterbury was founded in 597 AD.)

== History ==
The cathedral school in Rochester was founded in 604 AD, at the same time as the cathedral. It was refounded by Henry VIII in 1541 during the English Reformation when the monastery in Rochester was dissolved. It is the second oldest school in the United Kingdom after King's School, Canterbury.

== Leadership ==
The current principal is Simon Fisher. Owen Smith is the Vice Principal (Senior School) and Kellie Crozer is the Vice Principal (Junior School) & Interim Head of EYFS. (Note: Note that Jeremy Walker took over as principal from Ian Walker in 2012, the same surname has caused some confusion.)

== Site ==
The school is housed in a variety of buildings around Rochester (the school also uses Rochester Cathedral for school services).

=== Senior school ===
==== Satis House ====
A 16th-century town house rebuilt as an 18th-century Georgian house, the school took it over in 1950 and purchased it outright in 1968. It had originally been built for Richard Watts who had entertained Queen Elizabeth I there in 1573: asked for her verdict on her stay, the Queen had answered, "satis" (from the Latin satis for "enough"), hence the name of the house. Above the entrance portico is a 1578 bust of Watts who represented Rochester in Parliament between 1563 and 1571. At Satis House are the office of the principal of King's Rochester, administrative offices and the Sixth Form Centre.

==== Main School ====
The oldest building in use which was specifically built for the school. It was completed in 1742, the tower and additional classrooms were added in 1880 and the building extended with porches either end in 1913. During WW2 the building was commandeered for ARP purposes. The wooden roof which had served as the school's assembly hall was removed in 1976. In 1985, it became the Design and Technology Centre.

==== Cheetham Memorial Building ====
This was opened in 1909 by Richard Glazebrook, director of the National Physical Laboratory. It originally consisted of a science laboratory and an art room and now contains two computing suites. The Venerable Samuel Cheetham was Archdeacon of Rochester from 1882 until his death in 1908.

==== Science Centre ====
It contains 6 laboratories and is currently being refurbished by Taskspace.

==== Mackean House ====
This was built in 1840 and later named after the last canon of the cathedral to live there, Canon William Herbert Mackean (1877–1960), Canon of Rochester 1925–58. The headmaster's study and the senior school were housed there until both were relocated Satis House in 1986. The property is marked on early maps as the house of the second prebend. During World War 2 the house was used for ARP purposes and is now used by the senior school English, geography, PE, economics and business studies departments.

==== Davies Court ====
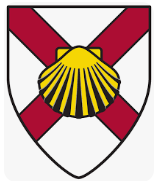
King's School Coat of Arms

Opened in 1982 by the Archbishop of York and named after Ernest William Davies (headmaster 1935–57), it houses the school's art, religious studies and language centres (French, Spanish and German). Memorial gates at the entrance from the Vines were dedicated in 2006.

==== Old St Margaret's ====
Originally a Richard Watts charitable school (as per the plaque on the façade explains), this is the oldest building in the towns of the Lower Medway in continuous educational use. As a Church of England primary school, St Margaret's, it was taken over by King's School in 1960 and purchased outright in 1968. It is used by the senior school mathematics, history and classics departments. Parts of the building and outbuildings house the offices of the school's Combined Cadet Force which celebrated its centenary in 2011.

==== School hall ====
This was opened and dedicated by the Archbishop of Canterbury in 1967. It is regularly used to host school productions, assemblies and other events.

==== King's Rochester Sports Centre ====
A joint venture with Medway Council, the King's Rochester Sports Centre was officially opened in June 2014 and provides among its modern facilities, netball and tennis courts and a gymnasium which are also available to the general public. The school also has a boathouse by Allington Lock near Aylesford on the River Medway which opened in 1984. The school has a long rowing tradition with King's School Rochester Boat Club being founded in 1961.

=== Preparatory School ===
Source: The main building was opened in 1958, extended in 1984 and with a new wing added in 1992. The part of King's Rochester was called the Junior School until 1989.

St Nicholas House The late Victorian former vicarage for St Nicholas Church, was purchased in 1946 and used as the Junior School until the new buildings were opened in 1958. From 1958 until 1974 it was a boarding house and now contains Preparatory School administrative offices. Adjacent to St Nicholas House was a wartime decontamination shelter which had been converted to Junior School changing rooms. An additional floor and gabled roof were added in 2000 and opened that year in memory of David Dann (King's Scholar 1942–52) and a Governor of the school, to provide additional music facilities.

Rookwood Previously used as a Junior School boarding house, as the first site of the Pre-Preparatory School (opened in 1988) and for the Nursery School and is now used for extra support lessons. From 1946 to 1961 it was the Headmaster's house.

St Ronan's Built in 1908, acquired in 1948 and now used as a supplementary boarding house until boarding capacity at School House was increased in 1972 and now houses the Music Department.

The Pavilion Situated above a bank on the west side of the paddock. The original building was created in 1905. An extension to the north, later called the Colours Room, was added in 1920 in memory of Major Maurice Miskin (1903–10), who was killed in action in 1918. The 25m Rifle Range immediately to the south and used by the Combined Cadet Force was built in 1926.

Conference Centre Opened in 2006, the Conference Centre consists of a small hall on the ground floor and a basement used as a dining hall for the Preparatory and Pre-Preparatory Schools.

=== Pre-Preparatory School ===
Chadlington House King's Rochester Pre-Preparatory School was opened in 2000 and named Chadlington House after Old Roffensian life peer Peter Gummer (Lord Chadlington). This modern building also now houses King's Nursery School. In 2017 'Armadilla Pods' were constructed in the grounds for music lessons.

== Headteachers ==
=== Senior school ===
Headmaster	Years as Headmaster	Duration
Rev. Robert William Whiston	1844–1877	33 years
John Langhorne	1877–1893	16 years
Rev. John Bennett Lancelot	1893–1901	8 years
Rev. Thomas Frederick Hobson	1901–1910	9 years
Rev. Richard Frederick Elwyn	1910–1913	3 years
Rev. William Parker	1913–1935	22 years
Rev. Ernest William Davies	1935–1957	22 years
Rev. Canon Douglas Vicary	1957–1975	18 years
Roy Ford	1975–1986	11 years
Ian Robert Walker	1986–2012	25 years
Jeremy Walker	2012–2018	6 years
Roger Overend (interim)	January – April 2019	4 months
Ben Charles	2019–2025	6 years
Simon Fisher	2025–Present	

=== Preparatory school ===
Head	Years as Head	Duration
John O'Kill	1977–1990	13 years
Chris Nickless	1990–2001	11 years
Roger Overend	2001–2018	17 years
Tom Morgan	2018–2024	6 years
Kellie Crozer	2024–Present	

=== Pre-preparatory school ===
Head	Years as Head	Duration
Anita Parkins	1990–2009	19 years
Sarah Skillern	2009–2016	7 years
Catherine Openshaw	2016–2020	4 Years
Kellie Crozer	2021–Present	

In 2025 the Pre-preparatory and Preparatory Schools were merged to form the Junior School.

== Notable alumni ==
- Charles Andrews, organist
- Sir Edwin Arnold, poet and author
- Sir Derek Barton, 1969 Nobel Prize laureate in Chemistry
- James Hadley Chase, thriller writer
- Michael Brown, Archdeacon of Nottingham
- Richard Dadd, artist
- Edward Mortlock Donaldson, World War II flying ace
- Christopher Gabbitas, singer with the King's Singers
- Michael S. K. Grant, IT professional and resident of the BCS
- John Griffiths, Warden of Wadham College, Oxford
- John Gummer, former Conservative cabinet minister
- Peter Gummer, Baron Chadlington, Lobbyist, PR executive, Conservative Life Peer (1996-2026)
- J. L. Joynes Sr., clergyman and schoolmaster
- Richard Keen, lawyer, Conservative Party politician, Shadow Advocate General for Scotland (2024 - )
- David Clive King, Stig of the Dump author
- Dinsdale Landen, actor
- Harold Stephen Langhorne, Brigadier-General in the Royal Army Ordnance Corps
- Geoffrey Lees, cricketer and educator
- G. R. S. Mead, author and member of the Theosophical Society
- Tris Osborne, Labour MP for Chatham and Aylesford
- Ian Parmenter, Australian television presenter and author (Consuming Passions)
- Peter Rogers, producer of the Carry On film series
- Simon Shackleton, musician from Lunatic Calm
- John Storrs, Dean of Rochester
- Pete Tong, BBC Radio 1 disc jockey
- Sir Cecil Wakeley, 1st Baronet, surgeon
- Matthew Walker, professional cricketer, Kent Cricket coach (2017–2024)
- Martin Warner, Bishop of Chichester
- Michael Wilkes, Adjutant-General to the Forces
- Mimi Webb, Singer
- Douglas Wilson, Bishop of Trinidad

== See also ==
- List of the oldest schools in the United Kingdom
- List of the oldest schools in the world
