= Rowley's Hill =

Hill in Cambridgeshire, England

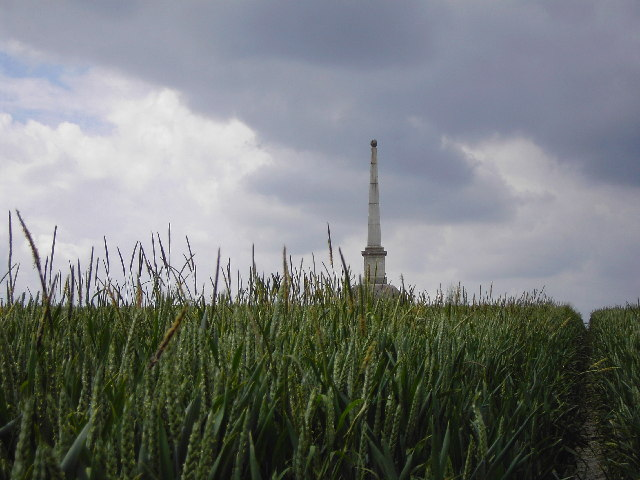
- The obelisk on the NE top of Rowley's Hill

Highest point
- Elevation: 51 m (167 ft)
- Prominence: 31 m (102 ft)
- Coordinates: 52.12722°N 0.08173°E

Geography
- Location: Cambridgeshire, England
- OS grid: TL426497
- Topo map: OS Landranger 154

Rowley's Hill is a hill in Cambridgeshire, near the villages of Harston and Newton. Although of only moderate height (51 m (167 ft)), it has a relatively large prominence of 31 m (102 ft) due to it being surrounded on all sides by a 'moat' of much lower land. It therefore stands separate from the other hills in the region and has a distinctive appearance.

The hill has a north east top, St Margaret's Mount, Maggot's Mount or Maggots Mound (52.1362°N 0.1056°E). On top of this is a grade II listed obelisk. It is a memorial to Gregory Wale, of Little Shelford, of the eighteenth century.
