= Algernon Langhorne =

British Army general

Major-General Algernon Philip Yorke Langhorne, CB, DSO, MC (18 July 1882 – 28 November 1945) was an officer in the British Army.

== Early life and family ==
Born in Wentworth, Langhorne was the son of Reverend John Langhorne, and Frances Annesley Yorke and was educated at Marlborough College, Wiltshire, England. His siblings were Charles Edward C. J. Langhorne (1873–?), Ursula Vansittart H. Langhorne (1874–?), Herbert Yorke Langhorne (1877–?), and James Archibald Dunboyne Langhorne (1879–1950). Brigadier-General Harold Stephen Langhorne was his half brother.

He played cricket for India in 1903/4 (when the players representing India were European).

He was married in 1920 to Joan Jenkinson, the only daughter of Colonel Joseph Hill C.B. of Wollaston Hall and Mrs Hill of 6 South Street, London, W1. She was the widow of Captain John Banks Jenkinson, Rifle Brigade, son and heir of Sir George Jenkinson, 12th Baronet, and mother of the 13th baronet.

== Early career ==
Before the First World War he spent many years as a gunner subaltern.

In 1900 he was commissioned into the Cork Royal Garrison Artillery (Militia), which was embodied during the Second Boer War. He was with them from 1900 to 1902, when he was gazetted into the regular army as a second lieutenant of the Royal Garrison Artillery on 24 May 1902. He was promoted to lieutenant in April 1905. In 1908 he was selected as ADC by Sir James Wilcocks, then commanding the 1st (Peshwar) Division. He accompanied Wilcocks who as GOC Bazar Valley Field Force directed operations against the Zakka Khel expedition in February and March 1908. For this Langhorne was mentioned in despatches. He also accompanied Wilcocks on the Mohmand expedition of 1908 in the next two months. Langhorne was present at the engagement of Matta and Kargha. He was again mentioned in dispatches and won the D.S.O. When Wilcocks was appointed to command the Northern Army he took Langhorne with him. Langhorne did not return to regimental duty until 1913.

== First World War ==
At the outbreak of war in 1914, Willcocks assumed command of the Indian Corps despatched to France. He took Lieutenant Langhorne with him as ADC. Langhorne served as such during the battle of La Bassee in October and November 1914.

In October 1914 Langhorne was promoted to captain and became Camp Commandant of the Indian Corps.

He served in World War I and was mentioned in dispatches.

He was promoted to Lieutenant-Colonel (1929), Colonel (1931), and Major-General (1935). He was Brigadier Royal Artillery, Aldershot Command from 1934 to 1936 and was made Inspector of Royal Artillery, War Office 1936–1939. He retired in 1939.

He received the following awards: C.B. (1937); Distinguished Service Order (1908); Military Cross
