= Henry Wale =

Henry Wale may refer to:

- Henry Oscar (1891–1969), born Henry Wale, English stage and film actor
- Henry John Wale (1827–1892), English author, soldier and church minister
