= Andrew Paton =

Andrew Paton may refer to:

- Andy Paton (1923–2014), Scottish football player and manager
- Andy Paton Jr., American tennis player
- Andrew Paton (manufacturer), Scottish-born Canadian manufacturer and politician
- Andrew Archibald Paton, British diplomat, orientalist, and author
