= Balfour Mission =

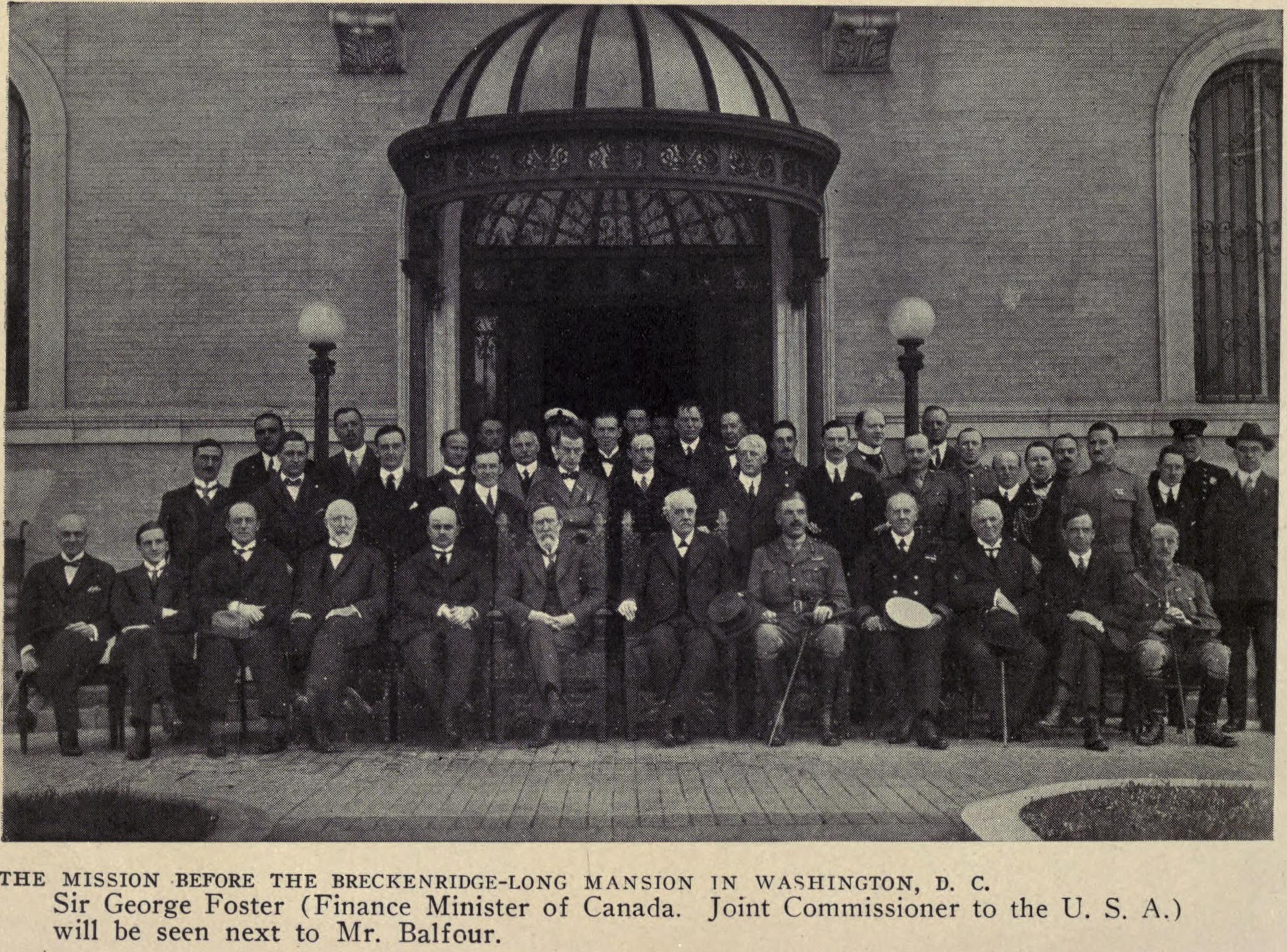
The Balfour Mission, outside the home of Breckinridge Long at 2829 16th Street NW, Washington DC, where the group stayed during the trip (today the Mexican Cultural Institute).

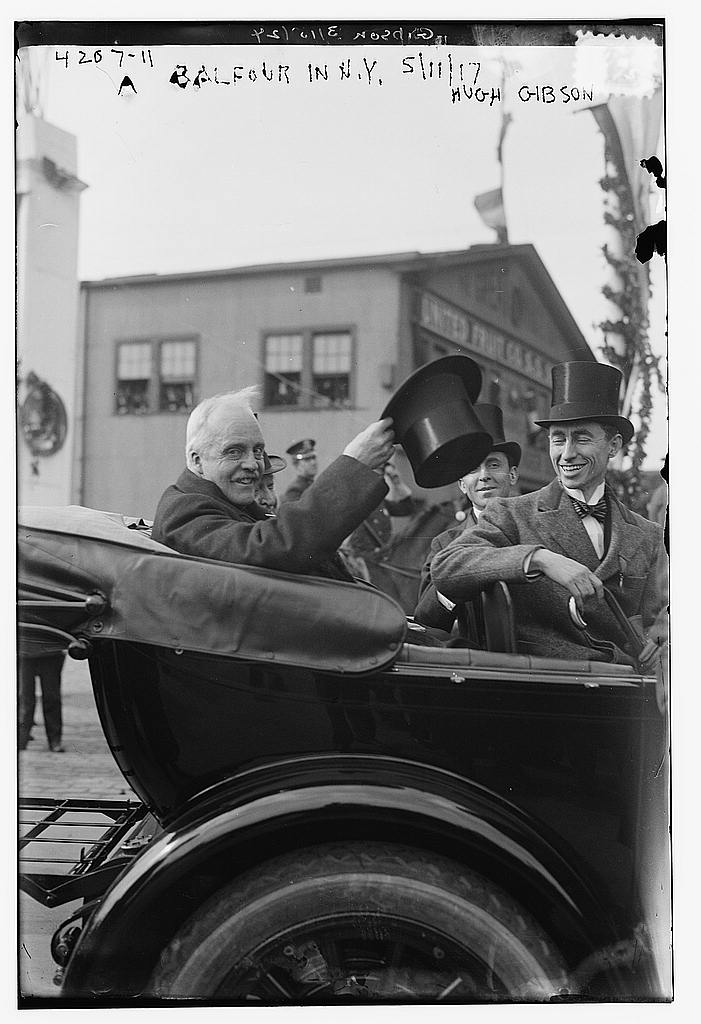
Balfour in New York, 11 May 1917

The Balfour Mission, also referred to as the Balfour Visit, was a formal diplomatic visit to the United States by the British government during World War I, shortly after the United States declaration of war on Germany (1917).

The mission's purpose was to promote wartime cooperation, and to assess the war-readiness of Britain's new partner. British Foreign Secretary Arthur Balfour, President Woodrow Wilson and Wilson's chief advisor, Colonel House, had a meeting that discussed the secret treaties which bound Britain and France to Italy and others. Members of the delegation met with many senior leaders in the national government, finance, industry and politics, to explain the British positions. Other meetings dealt with the supply of munitions and other exports, and the proposed Balfour Declaration.

France sent a separate mission at the same time, and these were followed later in 1917 by missions from Italy, Russia, Belgium and Japan, all of whom were invited to address the US Congress.

== History ==
The mission left England on 11 April and arrived in Washington, on 22 April, having landed in Halifax, Nova Scotia on 20 April.

Balfour addressed both houses of Congress – the House of Representatives on 5 May and the Senate on 8 May – becoming the first British person to do so.

Balfour, Colonel Edward M. House and Wilson dined at the White House on 30 April, after which Balfour recounted the details of the secret treaties regarding Italy and the Near East to Wilson. On 18 May, Balfour sent Wilson copies of the Sykes-Picot Agreement, the Allied Notes of March–April 1915, the Treaty of London (1915) and the Treaty of Bucharest (1913).

Cecil Spring Rice, the British ambassador to the United States, stated that the mission had created "an entirely new atmosphere in Anglo- American relations".

== Travelling group ==
The travelling party included:

- Arthur Balfour, British foreign secretary and former prime minister
- Walter Cunliffe, 1st Baron Cunliffe, governor of the Bank of England
- Sir Eric Drummond, who in 1920 became the first secretary-general of the League of Nations (1920–1933)
- Ian Malcolm
- Cecil Dormer
- Geoffrey G. Butler
- Tom Bridges, major general
- Herbert Henry Spender-Clay
- Dudley de Chair, admiral who was Naval Adviser to Foreign Office on Blockade Affairs
- Vincent Lawford
- Eustace Percy, 1st Baron Percy of Newcastle, who had previously spent four years as secretary at the British Embassy in Washington, and who remained in America for twelve months following the Balfour Mission.

Others in the party included:

- War Office — Colonel Goodwin, Colonel Langhorne, Major L. W. B. Rees, and Major C. E. Dansey
- Blockade Department Experts — Lord Eustace Percy; Andrew Archibald Paton; F. P. Robinson, of the Board of Trade; S. McKenna, of the War Trade Intelligence Department, and M. D. Peterson of the Foreign Trade Department, Foreign Office.
- Wheat Commission — Alan Anderson, Chairman, and H. D. Vigor.
- Munitions — Walter Layton (Later Baron Layton), Director of Requirements and Statistics Branch, Secretariat of the Ministry of Munitions; C. T. Phillips, American and Transport Department, Ministry of Munitions; Captain Leeming, Mr. Amos.
- Ordnance and Lines of Communication — Captain Heron.
- Supplies and Transports — Major F. K. Puckle.

== See also ==
- Diplomatic history of World War I

== Bibliography ==
- Burk, Kathleen (24 April 2014). "The Balfour Mission, April—May 1917: the American Giant Awakens". Britain, America and the Sinews of War 1914–1918 (RLE The First World War). Routledge. ISBN 978-1-317-70051-7.
- GPO (1917). Visiting War Missions to the United States: Proceedings in the Senate and House of Representatives, Congress of the United States, on the Occasion of the Receptions Tendered to the War Missions of France, Great Britain, Italy, Russia, Belgium, and Japan. Fb &C Limited. ISBN 978-1-332-83156-2.
- Loper, Richard Lee (1967). The Balfour Mission: Anglo-American Diplomacy, April–May, 1917.
- Tillman, Seth P. (8 December 2015). Anglo-American Relations at the Paris Peace Conference of 1919. Princeton University Press. ISBN 978-1-4008-7672-3.
- Towne, Charles Hanson (1 September 2015). The Balfour Visit: How America Received Her Distinguished Guest. BiblioBazaar. ISBN 978-1-341-06014-4. Archived from the original on 21 April 2017.
- Venzon, Anne Cipriano (2 December 2013). "Balfour Mission". The United States in the First World War: An Encyclopedia. Taylor & Francis. p. 63. ISBN 978-1-135-68453-2. Archived from the original on 3 February 2014.
