= Harston =

Village in Cambridgeshire, England

Coordinates: 52.138°N 0.081°E

- Harston village sign in the green

- Location within Cambridgeshire
- Population: 1,729 (2011)
- Civil parish: Harston
- District: South Cambridgeshire
- Shire county: Cambridgeshire
- Region: East
- Country: England
- Sovereign state: United Kingdom
- Post town: CAMBRIDGE
- Postcode district: CB22
- Dialling code: 01223
- Police: Cambridgeshire
- Fire: Cambridgeshire
- Ambulance: East of England
- UK Parliament: South East Cambridgeshire

Harston is a village and civil parish in South Cambridgeshire, England, located around 5 miles (8 km) south of Cambridge. In 2011, it had a population of 1,740.

== Village Sign ==
The village sign was erected in the Queen's Silver Jubilee year and depicts the eight artesian wells that used to exist in the village, a bee skep commemorating a history of honey making, and rooks.

== History ==
In the Domesday Book Harston is listed under the hundred of Thriplow, and has 29 households.

== Harston House ==
Harston House is a historic private house in Harston. It was formerly known as Harston Hall. It is grade II* listed.

Although the main building is seventeenth century parts of its structure date back to at least 1480 Roman tiles have been found in the grounds and in the foundations of Harston House, supporting a tradition that a property has stood on this land ever since Roman times. The house is noteworthy for its distinctive features of English architecture, including its original Tudor fireplace, original fine wooden panelling from the seventeenth century and its rare pilasters made of clunch.

This is not to be confused with Harston House student accommodation at Addenbrooke's hospital.

=== Notable residents of Harston House ===
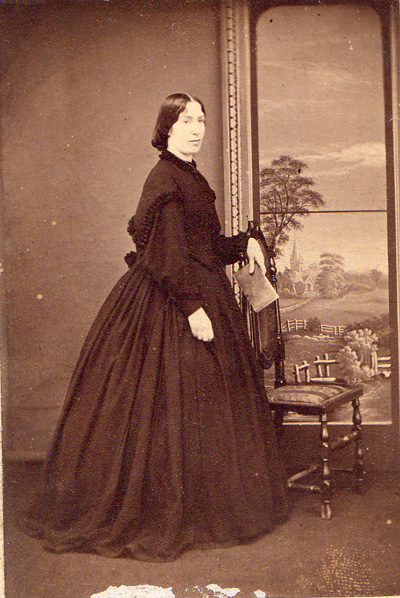
Henrietta Long of Harston Hall

The Wale family

Harston Hall was owned in the seventeenth century by the Wale family whose descendants included Thomas Wale, whose life and eighteenth-century personal papers constituted the book My Grandfather's Pocket Book. The Wale family were subsequently Lords of the Manor of the Tiptofts close by.

The Long family

During the second half of the nineteenth century the house was owned by William Long (died 1883), whose wife was Henrietta Bridge. Henrietta was the granddaughter of John Littel-Bridge and Margaret Hurrell. She was a direct descendant of Gregory Wale. One account of the Long family describes them thus:

"Sir. W. Graham Greene's mother came to the house in 1891 and soon afterwards (1893) she bought it from the Longs after the death of Mrs. Long. It had been in the hands of the Long family for some time and was known in those days as the Long House of the Longs. Mr. Long was a very tall man and had sons who were all over six feet in height. He was a great character and many stories are told about him. He used to add to his already great height by walking around his garden on stilts and this enabled him to see what was going on over the garden wall. Some legends belonging to the time of the Civil War have been told of Harston House but they carry no conviction Formerly a large brick dove cote stood at the end of the orchard but was unfortunately pulled down by Mr. Long. Its huge foundations still trouble the gardener in his digging operations and it was this Dove Cote which was large enough to seat fifty men when the Horkey feasts were held there. Tradition has it that the Dove Cote was built on the site of a Roman villa".

The Graham Greenes

In 1893 the house was bought by Sir William Graham Greene who helped to establish the Naval Intelligence Department prior to the Second World War The author Graham Greene used to come to Harston House to spend his summers with Sir William (his uncle). The garden at Harston House provided the setting for his 1963 short story Under the Garden. According to Graham Greene's description of his childhood:

"It was at Harston I found quite suddenly I could read — the book was Dixon Brett, Detective. I didn't want anyone to know of my discovery, so I read only in secret, in a remote attic, but my mother must have spotted what I was at all the same, for she gave me Ballantyne's The Coral Island for the train journey home — always an interminable journey with the long wait between trains at Bletchley..."

The Armstrongs

Terence Edward Armstrong and Iris Forbes (the daughter of James Grant Forbes) whom he married in 1943.

== Transport ==
The village is located on the A10 road, which provides links to Cambridge and the M11 motorway to the north, and Royston, Hertford and London to the south. The village was also once served by a railway station on the Hitchin-Cambridge Line. However, the station closed in 1963 under the Beeching Axe.

Foxton railway station, on the same line as the former Harston station, remains open and is located about 1.8 miles south of the village on the A10.

== Notable people ==
Thomas Wale of Little Shelford and Harston, aged 93

- Thomas Wale

== Sources ==
- Helen C. Greene (compiler) (1937). Harston — History and Local Records of a Cambridgeshire Village.
- Reverend Henry John Wale M.A. (1883). My Grandfather's Pocket Book. From A.D. 1701 to 1796. London: Chapman and Hall.
