= Ian Parmenter =

British chef (1945–2024)

Ian Parmenter OAM
- Born: Ian Richard Parmenter; 24 July 1945; London, England, United Kingdom
- Died: 13 April 2024 (aged 78)
- Occupations: Television chef, author
- Known for: Consuming Passions (TV series)

Ian Richard Parmenter, OAM (24 July 1945 – 13 April 2024) was an English-born Australian media professional and author with a half-century experience in newspapers, magazines, television and radio. He presented 450 five-minute programs of the cookery show Consuming Passions on the Australian ABC television network. The program was also broadcast in 19 other countries.

== Life and career ==
Parmenter was born in London, England on 24 July 1945, after the End of World War II in Europe. His father was a brewer and his mother was a housewife. He moved to Belgium aged nine with his family, where he learnt cooking from a Belgian housekeeper with his first dish being their style of chips. He attended a Montessori school in Belgium before boarding in England at King's School, Rochester, where he was expelled for partying. He became a journalist in Fleet Street, London, before moving to Australia in 1971. He joined the ABC in Perth and qualified as a TV producer in 1974. He developed a culinary flair in private life, having no professional experience in foodservice.

Parmenter also wrote several recipe collections and three books, listed below. In 1999 he moved to the Western Australian town of Margaret River, where he had purchased a cottage shortly after Consuming Passions first aired.

In the 2011 Australia Day Honours, Parmenter was awarded the Medal of the Order of Australia "for service to the food and tourism industries as an event director, author, journalist and broadcaster".

Parmenter died on 13 April 2024, at the age of 78.

== Publications ==
- Cooking with Passion (ABC Books)
- Bon Appétit With Ian Parmenter (Gore & Osment Publications)
- Sheer Bottled Bliss (HarperCollins)
- All-Consuming Passions: Recipes Gathered from a Lifetime of Loving Food (HarperCollins)
