= Royal Army Clothing Depot =

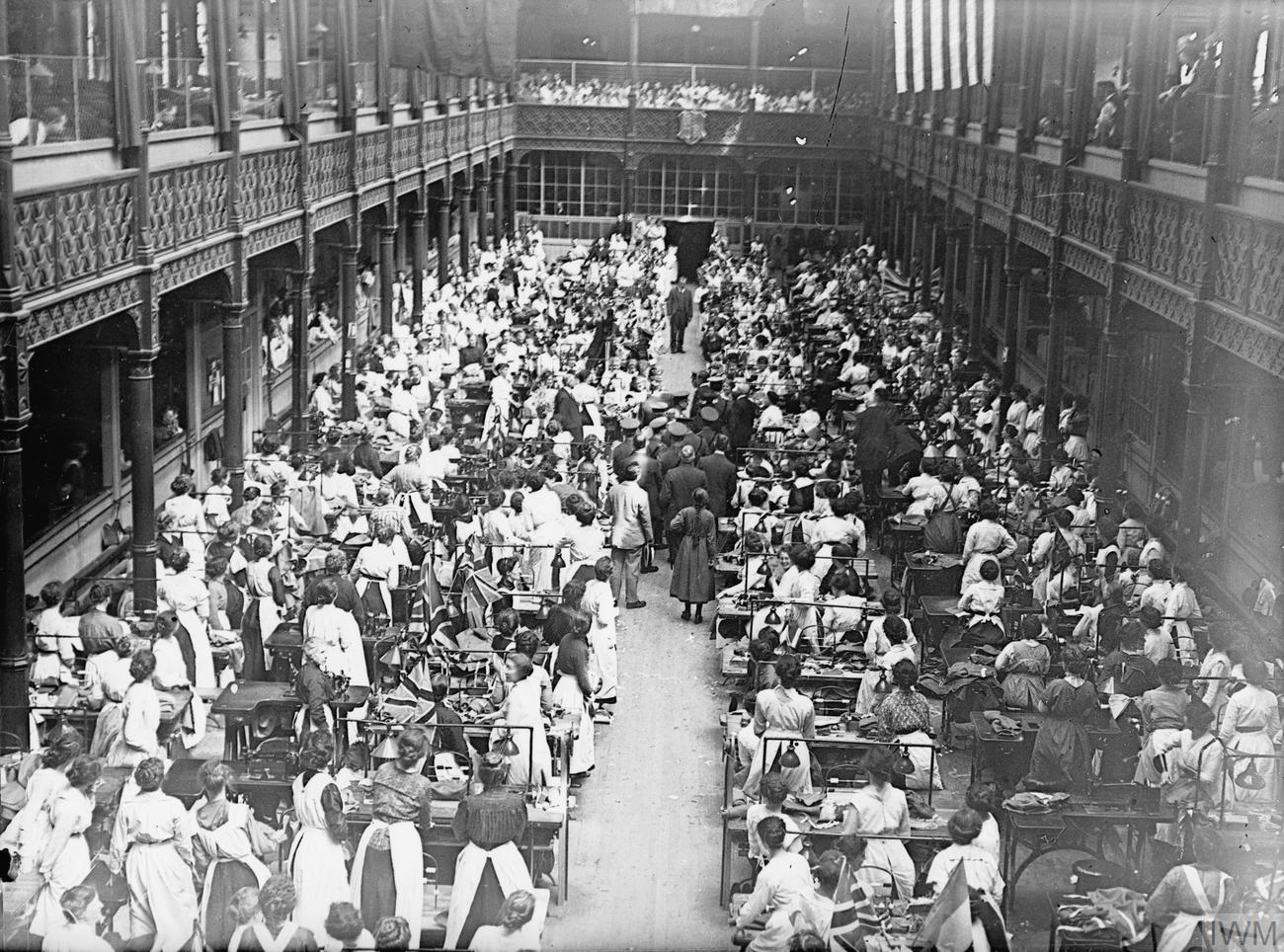
Central hall of the Royal Army Clothing Depot, Grosvenor Road, Pimlico

The Royal Army Clothing Depot was a factory and warehouse, providing uniforms and other items of clothing for the British Army. It was located in Grosvenor Road, Pimlico, London, England. Established in the 1850s, it remained in operation until 1932; for much of its history the depot was part of the Royal Army Ordnance Corps and its precursors. During the early part of the First World War, it was headed by Colonel Harold Stephen Langhorne.

== History ==
In 1855, the War Office took responsibility for provision of Army clothing; previously, each individual regiment had been responsible for procuring its uniforms. A storage depot was established, initially within the Ordnance Depot at Weedon in Northamptonshire, before being relocated to Pimlico in 1859. In 1856, a factory had been built at Woolwich to manufacture uniforms for the Artillery and Engineer corps. In 1863, a factory was established in Pimlico (a 70-year lease having been purchased on the site in Grosvenor Road); by the end of the decade the Woolwich factory had closed, with its operations having transferred to Pimlico. From 1870, the establishment at Pimlico (with its departments responsible for storage, manufacture and inspection of army clothing) combined with the Clothing Branch of the War Office to form a new Army Clothing Department (titled the Royal Army Clothing Department from 1887).

With its lease coming to an end, the factory at Pimlico closed in 1932, when new systems of clothing procurement for the Army were put into effect. Storage provision was moved from Pimlico to the Ordnance Depots at Didcot and Woolwich, and the following year, the Royal Army Clothing Department was abolished. Dolphin Square now stands on the site in Grosvenor Road.
