= Charles Wale =

British Army general

General Sir Charles Wale KCB
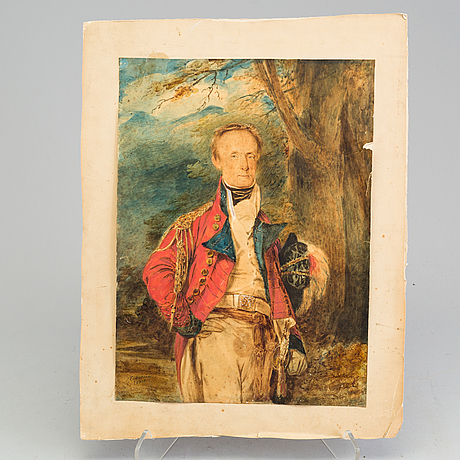
- Born: 16 August 1765
- Died: 20 March 1845 (aged 79)

Sir Charles Wale KCB (16 August 1765 – 20 March 1845) was an English General and the last British governor of Martinique between about 1812 and 1815. On 25 February 1831 he was appointed Colonel of the 33rd Regiment of Foot and was given the governorship in recognition of his role in the capture of Guadeloupe from the French in 1810. He was later knighted for his service.

== Early life and family ==
His father was Thomas Wale and his mother Louisa Rudolphina Prediger Raften (who came from Riga). Charles's older sister Mary married a Thomas Pemberton of Trinity College, Cambridge. Wale attended Wisbech Grammar School and later studied in London.

He began his military career in 1779 with the 88th Foot under Colonel Thomas Keating. He initially served in Jamaica and in 1780 became a lieutenant in the 97th. With his new regiment he sailed to Gibraltar with Vice-Admiral George Darby's fleet in 1782 and participated in the latter part of the defence during the Great Siege of Gibraltar. He obtained a company in the 12th Foot on 25 June 1783, but was placed on Half-pay soon afterwards. On 23 May 1786 he exchanged to the 46th Foot, and served with it in Ireland and the Channel Islands. He married in 1793; his prospective father-in-law had offered to make a financial settlement on him if he left the army, and his own father offered a settlement if he married. He therefore went on half-pay and became adjutant of the Cambridgeshire Militia on 4 December 1793. He served with the regiment for three years, improving its discipline and training. He then returned on 25 April 1798 with the rank of major to command the Cambridgeshire Supplementary Militia.

Following the death of his first wife he returned to full pay on 6 August 1799 as a captain in the 20th Foot, and served with that regiment in the expedition to the Helder (the Anglo-Russian invasion of Holland) in the autumn. He later served again in Jamaica and in Bengal.

== Marriage and children ==
Charles married Louisa Sherard in 1793. She died in 1896. They had six children. Charles married a total of three times. He had twelve children including author the Reverend Henry John Wale M.A. and Frederick Wale (1822–1858) who was present at the relief of Lucknow and command of the 1st Sikh irregular cavalry ('Wale's horse').

== Monuments ==
The following summary of the life of Charles Wale comes from the Charles Wale Memorial in All Saints parish church, Little Shelford, Cambridgeshire:

"Sacred to the memory of General Sir Charles Wale KCB Colonel of HM 33rd Regiment of Foot Born 16 August 1765 Died 20 March 1845

Aged 81 Years He was the youngest son of Thomas Wale of this parish. He entered the army in 1779 and served at the siege and bombardment of Gibraltar by the French and Spaniards in 1801-1802-1803 and subsequently in Holland, Ireland & India. In February 1810 at the head of his brigade the Royal York Rangers he decided the capture of the island of Guadeloupe from the French by carrying in person the almost inaccessible heights of Matauba for which service in which he was severely wounded he received a medal and was made governor of Martinique till the peace 1814 when for his services during the war he was made Knight Commander of the Bath. True to the device and motto of his ancestors he displayed in bold relief the courage and energy of a Christian whose only shield and hope is salvation by the cross. Sr Charles Wale was thrice married. Firstly – to Louisa daughter of Revd Castel Sherard by whom he had issue five children Thomas Sherard who died unmarried at Surinam 1821 Charles and Philip Newton and Louisa who died in infancy and Alexader Malcolm Vicar of Sunninghil Berks (who in 1835 married Caroline Ardrighetti and had issue four daughters), The said Louisa died at Shelford 1806. Secondly – in 1808 to Isabella daughter of Revd Geo. Johnson BD Prebendary of Lincoln and had issue Isabella Martha married in 1834 to Sherlock Willis Esq The above named Isabella Wale died at Barbados 1810, Thirdly – in 1815 to Henrietta daughter & coheiress of Revd Tho: Brent by whom he had issue six sons Cha. Brent born 1817 Rob. Gregory 1820 George Henry & Frederick twins born Geneva 1822 Arthur 1825 and Henry John 1827 and four daughters.

== A family record ==
The Wale Family may hold a record for the longevity over three generations, as described below in the journal Notes and Queries:

A LINK WITH THE PAST.—Mrs. Richard Dill of Hove celebrated her 100th birthday on 27 December 1923. She is the daughter of General Sir Charles Wale, K.C.B., who was born in 1762, and died in 1845, at the age of 83; her grandfather Mr. Thomas Wale was born in 1701 and died in 1796 at age of 95. These three lives therefore compass a period of-222 years. Has any family a record exceeding this ? That anyone living in 1923 should be able to say that her grandfather was born in the reign of William' III seems a sufficiently remarkable fact to appear in the records of "N & Q". Further particulars of Mrs. Dill's family were published in The Sussex Daily News for 24 December. GERALD LODER.

== Other sources ==
- "Wale, Sir Charles". Oxford Dictionary of National Biography (online ed.). Oxford University Press. doi:10.1093/ref:odnb/28451. (Subscription, Wikipedia Library access or UK public library membership required.). The first edition of this text is available at Wikisource: "Wale, Charles" . Dictionary of National Biography. London: Smith, Elder & Co. 1885–1900.
- Reverend Henry John Wale M.A. (1883). My Grandfather's Pocket Book. From A.D. 1701 to 1796. London: Chapman and Hall.
