= Cecil Dormer =

British minister

Sir Cecil Francis Joseph Dormer (14 February 1883 – 28 July 1979) was the British Minister to Norway between 1934 and 1941.

== Early life and background ==
Dormer was the son of Hon. Hubert Francis Dormer (1837-1913) and Mary Jane Elizabeth Digby (d. 1938). His father was a younger son of Thaddeus Dormer, 11th Baron Dormer.

== Military career ==
In April–May 1917 he was a member of the Balfour Mission, intended to promote cooperation between the US and UK during World War I.

After the German invasion of Norway in April 1940 he joined Norway's government and King on their move northwards, and followed the government into exile in London in June 1940. He was appointed Ambassador to Poland's exile government from 1941 until 1943.

== Personal life ==
On 25 February 1915, Dormer married Lady Mary Alice Clara Feilding (31 March 1888 – 7 March 1973), the daughter of Rudolph Feilding, 9th Earl of Denbigh.

== Awards and honours ==
He was knighted KCMG in the 1937 Coronation Honours.
