= Arneri family =

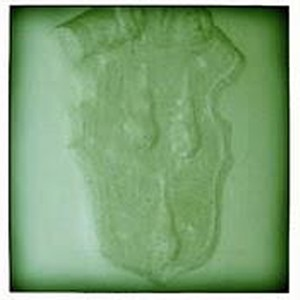
The Arneri coat of arms

The Arneri family were land proprietors & merchant ship owners on the Dalmatian island of Korčula, since the 15th century. Arneri Palace, placed in the Old town of Korčula is built in Venetian Gothic architecture and is one of landmarks of the island. It has a bronze knocker adorning the door representing Hercules swinging two lions by their tails. In the courtyard there is a marble draw-well. It has three pears cut into it. This symbol is the arms of the family.

Andrew A. Paton an English writer (19th century) spoke to Signor Arneri. Andrew Paton described him as a polite gentleman who had a white neck cloth and a broad-brimmed hat:

Signor Arneri: "These three pears you see on the wall," said he, "are the arms of my family. Piruzović was the name, when, in the earlier part of the 15th century, my ancestors built this palace; so that, you see, I am Dalmatian. All the family, fathers, sons, and brothers, used to serve in the fleets of the Republic (Republic of Venice); but the hero of our race was Arneri Piruzović, whose statue you see there, who fought, bled, and died at the Siege of Candia, whose memory was honoured by the Republic, and whose surviving family was liberally pensioned; so his name of our race. We became Arneri, and ceased to be Piruzović.

The original Patriarch of the clan was called Dobroslav (Boniface) Peruzzi. He had a status of a minor nobleman (local Patrician status of the City of Korčula). It is believed that the clan's ancestors (and partial benefactors) might have been the Peruzzi family of Florence. Pertaining to their trading links (in wood, wheat & iron ore) with Western Bosnia and South Central Croatia, and the subsequent abandonment of all trading posts towards the interiors (as a resulting factor of the Ottoman invasion), might have given rise to the hypothesis that the family's origin came from Bosnia. While it is very likely that these activities netted them further titles (particularly with the Kingdom of Hungry), the significance of these holdings remain unclear.

In 1420 the family was mentioned in the charter of the town of Korčula as the Duke/Lord of the Manor of Korčula. In 1558 the clan was awarded Venetian holdings on the Island of Hvar, thereby making them Counts there as well. Later, land acquisition in Brač, Split, Trogir, Zadar, Vis, etc. placed the family holdings among the largest in Venetian Dalmatia.

Other noble families of Korčula were Kanavelić, Izmaeli, De Polo, Gabrijelić and Nikoničić.

== Surname ==
Notable people with the surname Arneri include:

- Rafo Arneri (1837–1899), Croatian politicican
- Roko Arneri (1865–1948), Croatian politician
- Vlaho Arneri (1872–1956), Croatian doctor and medical inspector
- Slavko Arneri (1919–1978), Croatian football player and coach
- Gojko Arneri (1935–1983), Croatian swimmer
- Neda Arnerić (1953–2020), Serbian actress
