= Thomas Wale =

Thomas Wale of Little Shelford and Harston, aged 93

Thomas Wale was a Cambridgeshire gentleman born at Risby, Suffolk on 7 September 1701 and died in 1796. He is notable for having left a significant quantity of documents collated throughout his life which constituted the book My Grandfather's Pocket Book. His documents provide a unique insight into 18th-century English life. The Oxford Dictionary of National Biography refers to him as "an eighteenth-century squire".

== Background ==
He was the son of Margaret Sparke of Risby and Gregory Wale. His personal papers were sealed in a cupboard in his house and only discovered a century later when the property was destroyed. These papers form the basis of the book "My Grandfather's Pocket Book", published by his grandson.

== Early life ==
He grew up and was educated at Raslingworth, Walden, and London. He became an apprentice to Mr William Allen at Lynn for six years, starting in about 1718.

== Career ==
Thomas Wale was a merchant in Riga and Narva over a period of thirty years. He described his occupation as "trafic and merchantdise" (page 339). Part of his business involved the trade of ships' masts. This family business had been commenced in the 17th century. It passed under a number of different names during the 18th century, according to his current partners. Most notably it was known as Wale, Fraser & Company (c1747), Wale, Auchterlony and company and Wale, Peirson & Ouchterlony. He also pursued farming in Cambridgeshire.

== The family business ==
In 1653, Robert Wale's wife was joyntured for life out of Harston Hall and her son, Robert, started the merchants business at Riga with £500 obtained by mortgage on this property. The Hall had been purchased by an earlier Thomas Wale in 1613.

Thomas Wale first visited Riga in 1724 aboard the Larke and traded there until 1730. He described his early business there as "chiefly in the factorage and commission way: For his said patron Mr Allen and his own friends".

== Family life ==
He married Louisa Rudolphina Rahten at Mittau, Courland, Poland on 17 March 1749. They married again in Riga in 1760 "to convince the world of their connubil rights". She was the daughter of Hoff Prediger the Reverend Nicolaus Friedrich Rahten of Lunenburg, Brunswick.

Thomas Wale had eight children, but only four survived. His sons included General Sir Charles Wale (born 15 August 1752) who became Colonel of the 33rd (The Duke of Wellington's) Regiment of Foot on 25 February 1831. Charles Wale was the last British governor of Martinique between about 1812 and 1815. He was responsible for capturing Guadeloupe from the French and was given the governorship in recognition of this.

Wale's sister Margaret Wale (born 24 February 1699 died 1762) lived at Harston, probably in Harston Hall. She married Allen Hurrell (senior, died 1740) at Little Shelford on 12 January 1719 and their daughter Margaret (Peggy) Hurrell (junior) married John (Littel) Bridge (died 1776, buried at Harston) an "eminent counsellor at law" at Lackford, near Risby, Suffolk near Bury St Edmunds in 1752 (In "My Grandfather's pocket book" this marriage is given (on page 307) as follows: "married Mr. Budge [i.e. Bridge] at Lackford, Aug.12th, 1758 [the '58 here may also be an error]. John Littel Bridge's brother Thomas was also in business in Riga, associated with Thomas Wale. Margaret Bridge's son was Thomas Bridge (Little) of Shudy Camps (died c1830). Thomas Bridge's daughter Henrietta Bridge married William Long and their daughter was Henrietta Langhorne. All of the above were notable landowners in Harston John Littel Bridge was the son of Robert Bridge of Shudy Camps and Sarah (or Susanna) daughter of Thomas (or John) Littel of Halstead Co, Essex

Thomas Wale left an early description of how foreigners became naturalised in England.

== Other details ==
He left papers containing to all details of his life and times, including recipes, ledgers, descriptions of his journeys and family, and copies of contemporary documents.

As well as accounts of his travels within England, Thomas Wale also left details about his voyages to Russia, Switzerland and Scotland.
