= Terence Edward Armstrong =

British polar geographer (1920–1996)

- Born: 7 April 1920; Oxted, Surrey, England
- Died: 21 February 1996 (aged 75); Harston, Cambridge, England
- Occupations: Geographic researcher; scholar; writer
- Known for: Russian economic and social geography; sea ice research

Terence Edward Armstrong (7 April 1920 – 21 February 1996) was a British polar geographer, sea ice specialist, writer, and expert on the Russian Arctic.

== Career ==
Terence Edward Armstrong was educated at Twyford School, Winchester College, and from 1938 took a first class honours in French and Russian languages at Magdalene College, Cambridge, graduating in 1940. During the Second World War he served in the Army Intelligence Corps and the 1st Airborne Division in North Africa, Italy and Holland, being wounded as a parachutist at Arnhem, and Oslo where he led a contingent of soldiers.

Following the War he returned to Cambridge where he became the first fellow in Soviet Arctic Studies between 1947 and 1956 at the Scott Polar Research Institute (SPRI), a position especially created for him. He was the SPRI Assistant Director of Research 1956–77, its Acting Director 1982–83, and the Reader in Arctic Studies 1977–83. He was a founding fellow and tutor of Clare Hall between 1964 and 1996 and was Clare's Vice-President from 1985 to 1987.

From the early 1950s Armstrong, who was fluent in Russian and under Anglo-Soviet Cultural Agreement exchange visits, pursued fieldwork within the Arctic Circle to the north of Russia, studying indigenous population demographics and education, settlement and regional economics, while interpreting Soviet publications, later writing the historical study Russian Settlement in the North (1965). This work led to a study of sea ice in the Northeast Passage, and its impact on Soviet shipping. For the Royal Navy Scientific Survey he sailed with the Canadian icebreaker HMCS Labrador on its 1954 maiden voyage through the Northwest Passage. For the SPRI Polar Record journal he provided yearly summaries of Soviet shipping movement. Armstrong's work was appreciated and trusted within the Soviet Union, this demonstrated when he was invited to Moscow to give the funeral oration for his Russian friend and fellow geographer Boris Kremer. Armstrong's body of study for Arctic Russia at the SPRI library has become a resource for visiting Russian scholars. His work became important with scholars and researchers to a broader Arctic study, particularly geographers George Rogers, the Canadian-based Graham Rowley, and the Alaskans Vic Fischer and Frank Darnell. In 1976 he and Darnell became founder members of a cross-cultural international education committee. Armstrong in 1978 published Circumpolar North with Graham Rowley and George Rogers. Armstrong retired in 1983, after which he became a Trent University, Ontario visiting professor, and was the Natural Environment Research Council's chairman.

Armstrong Reef in Antarctica was named by the UK Antarctic Place-Names Committee after Terence Edward Armstrong.

== Personal life ==
Armstrong was born at Oxted, Surrey, on 7 April 1920, and died at Harston in Cambridgeshire on 21 February 1996, where he had lived for 40 years at Harston House. He married Iris Forbes in 1943; they had four children.

== Honorary awards ==
Armstrong in 1963 received an honorary LLD from Montreal's McGill University, in 1980 an honorary DSc from the University of Alaska—where in 1970–72 he held a sabbatical—and in 1978 the Victoria Medal, and the Cuthbert Peek Award (1963), from the Royal Geographical Society in which he was a fellow. He was also a fellow of the Arctic Institute of North America. He was from 1965 to 1990 the Honorary Secretary of The Hakluyt Society, for which he managed the publication of 50 volumes of documents and papers. Armstrong was the International Glaciological Society's Honorary Treasurer between 1963 and 1970.

== Publications ==
- Sea ice north of the USSR, atlas, British Admiralty (1958)
- Russian settlement in the North (1965) Cambridge University Press; Reissue edition (2010). ISBN 0521148103
- Illustrated glossary of snow and ice (1966), with Brian Roberts and Charles Swithinbank, Scott Polar Research Institute
- Yermak's Campaign in Siberia: A selection of documents translated from the Russian by Tatiana Minorsky and David Wileman Hakluyt Society (1974), ISBN 0904180034
- Circumpolar North: Political and Economic Geography of the Arctic and Sub-Arctic, Methuen (1978). ISBN 0416854303
- The Northern Sea Route: Soviet Exploitation of the North East Passage, Cambridge University Press (2011), "the seminal work in English on the history of the Northern Sea Route from the 16th century to 1949"
- The Russians in the Arctic: Aspects of Soviet exploration and exploitation of the Far North, 1937-57, Methuen (1958); reprint Nabu Press (2014), ISBN 1295725584
