= James Langhorne =

British Army Brigadier

James Archibald Dunboyne Langhorne CBE, DSO (24 February 1879 – 11 May 1950, St John's Wood, London, England) was a British military officer. He was a brigadier in the British Army.

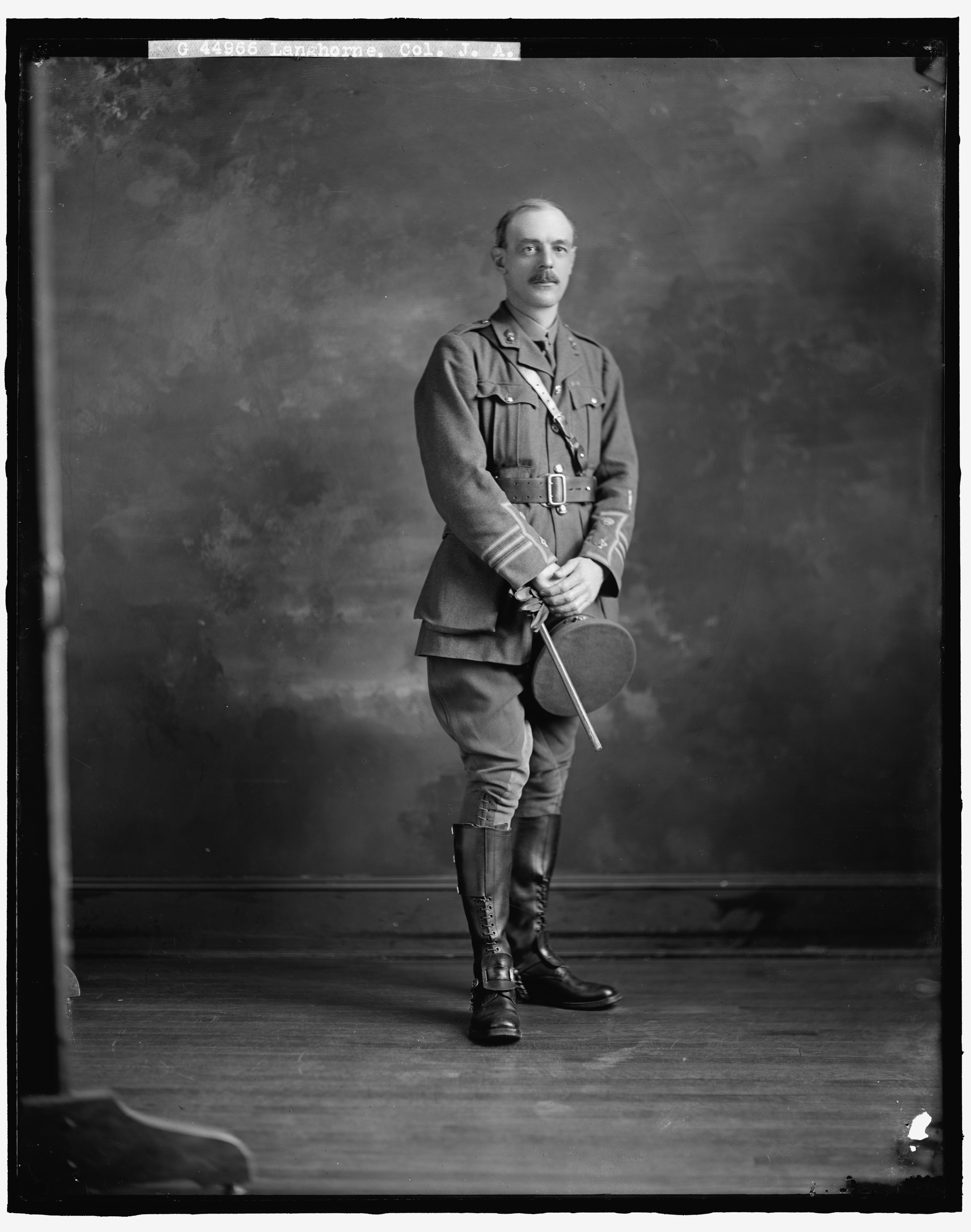

== Early life ==
Langhorne was the son of Reverend John Langhorne and Frances Yorke.

He was educated at Tonbridge School, Kent, and the Royal Military Academy at Woolwich.

He represented India at cricket in 1904/1905, when the Indian cricket team was made up of Europeans.

== Career ==
He entered the Royal Artillery in 1898 and was promoted to captain (1904) and major (1914). He served in the First World War, was wounded, mentioned in dispatches, and received the Distinguished Service Order. He was promoted to brevet lieutenant colonel and to lieutenant-colonel (1923) and colonel (1927). He was a member of Balfour Mission to the U.S. (1917), member of the Inter-Allied Control Commission, Germany 1920–1926 and served as a colonel in the Royal Artillery, Western Command 1927–1931. He was inspector-general of West Indian Local Forces and officer commanding the troops Jamaica (1932–1936).

== Personal life ==
In 1914, he married Constance Phyllis, the eldest daughter of Henry Grant Madan Conybeare, J.P. of Gunfield, Ingatestone, Essex. Constance died in 1937. His siblings included Major-General Algernon Philip Yorke Langhorne. Brigadier-General Harold Stephen Langhorne was his half-brother.

He retired in 1936 and was awarded a C.B.E. in that year.
