= Gregory Wale =

English gentleman

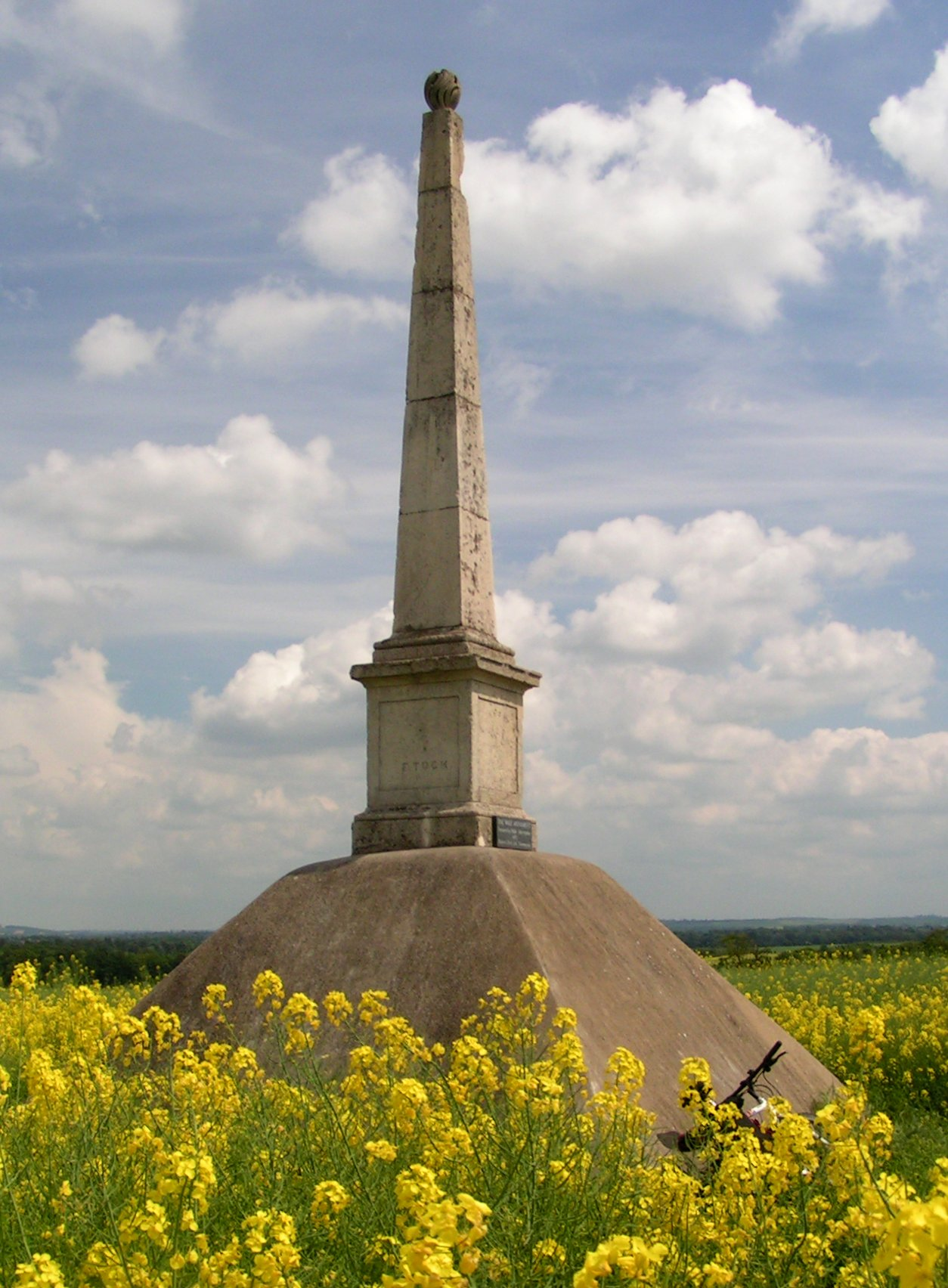
Obelisk to Gregory Wale

Gregory Wale (1668 – 5 June 1739) was a Cambridgeshire gentleman, a Justice of the Peace for Cambridgeshire and Conservator of the River Cam.

== Parents ==
Gregory Wale was the son of Thomas Wale of Lackford, Suffolk (born 8 January 1642) and Penelope Wood. He was one of four sons and two daughters.

Thomas Wale of Lackford was the son of Robert Wale of Bardfield Hall who in 1653 established the Wale family merchant business in Riga. Robert Wale was the grandson of Thomas Wale who purchased in 1613 Harston Hall, which may be considered the Wale ancestral home.

== The obelisk ==
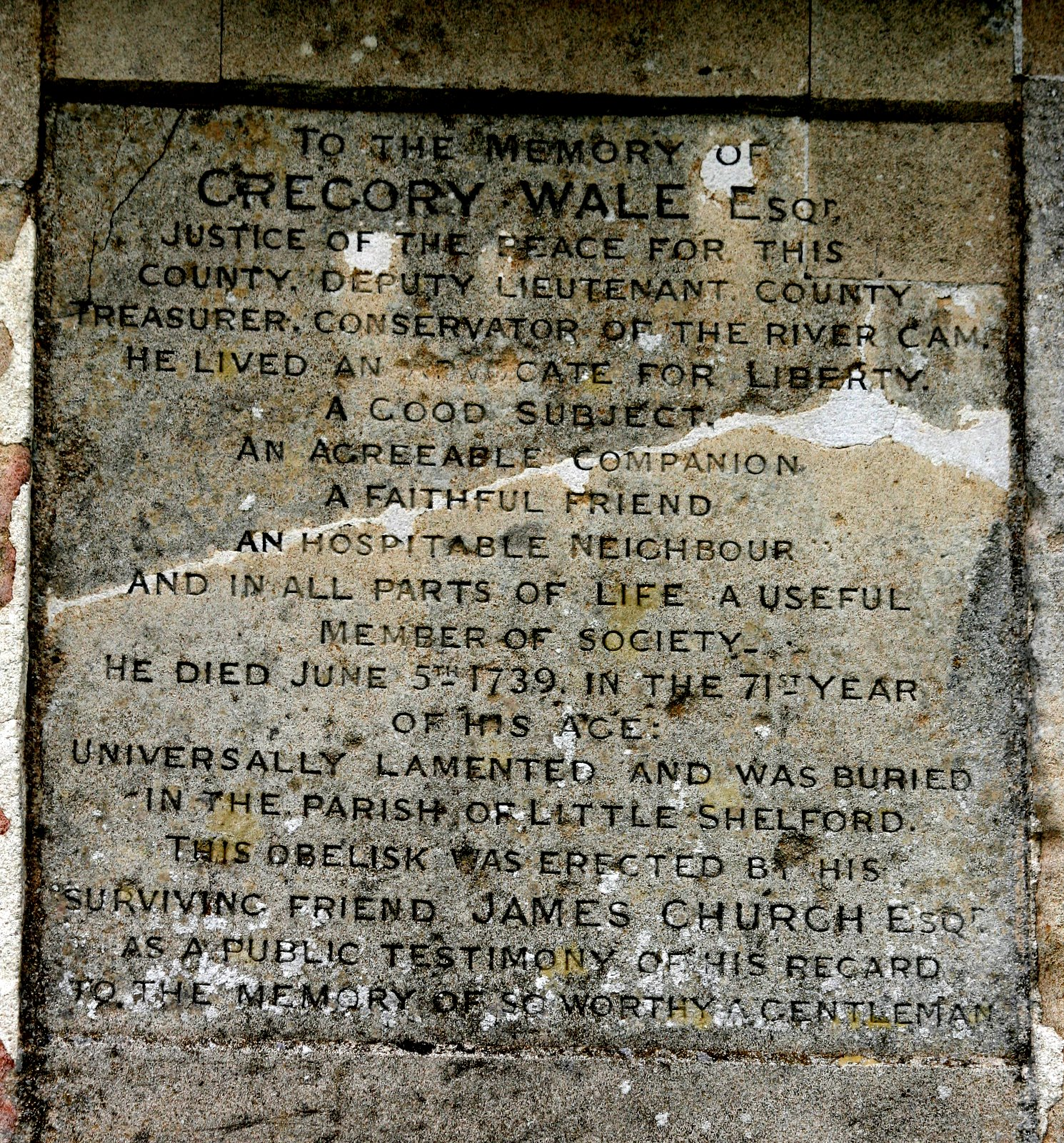
Inscription on the obelisk

He is notable for a large obelisk in his memory on Magots Mount (52.1362°N 0.1056°E) near Little Shelford, Cambridgeshire. This small hill is also known on some maps as St. Margaret's Mount. The obelisk was erected in 1739.

The monument is inscribed as follows:

To the Memory of Gregory Wale Esq, Justice of the Peace for this County. Deputy Lieutenant. County Treasurer. Conservator of the River Cam. He lived an advocate for liberty. A good subject. An agreeable companion, a faithful friend, an hospitable neighbour, and in all parts of life a useful member of society. He died June 5th 1739 in the 71st year of his age: universally lamented, and was buried in the parish church of Little Shelford. This obelisk was erected by his surviving friend James Church Esq as a public testimony of his regard to the memory of so worthy a gentleman.

Gregory Wale and James Church used to meet regularly at this place, and they agreed that when one of them died, the survivor should put up a monument to his friend's memory on the very spot where they so often met.

After the death of Gregory Wale, his granddaughter Margot Wale often used to walk up the mount and was very fond of it. At the latter end of her life she would lie at her window and watch her little hill and her friends and the country people got into the habit of calling it "Margot's Mount" and in later years this was corrupted to "Maggot's Mount".

Gregory Wale was Lord of the Manor of Tiptofts in Harston, Cambridgeshire from 1731–1735 His son and grandson were subsequently Lord of the Manor.

== Family life ==
He married Margaret Sparke in about 1700. Margaret Sparke came from Risby and was the daughter of Ezekiel Sparke. The children of Gregory Wale and Margaret Sparke were Margaret Wale (born 24 February 1699) of Harston and Thomas Wale of Little Shelford.

Margaret Wale (born 24 February 1699) lived at Harston, probably in Harston Hall. She married Allen Hurrell (senior, died 1740) at Little Shelford on 12 January 1719 and their daughter Margaret Hurrell (junior) married John (Littel) Bridge (died 1776, buried at Harston) an "eminent counsellor at law" at Lackford near Risby, Bury St Edmunds in 1752 John Littel Bridge's brother Thomas was also in business in Riga, associated with Thomas Wale. Margaret Bridge's son was Thomas Bridge (Little) of Shudy Camps (died c. 1830). Thomas Bridge's daughter Henrietta Bridge married William Long and their daughter was Henrietta Langhorne. All of the above were notable landowners in Harston John Littel Bridge was the son of Robert Bridge of Shudy Camps and Sarah (or Susanna) daughter of Thomas (or John) Littel of Halstead Co, Essex

Gregory Wale married his second wife Elizabeth Hitch and they had a son called Hitch Wale (born 1711). Elizabeth was the daughter of Captain Thomas Hitch.

== Other aspects of his life ==
Some of his personal papers form part of those which his great grandson used to write "My Grandfather's Pocket Book". This book (page 63) gives an interesting anecdote concerning the birth of his son Thomas Wale: "7ber 15th 1701 - Wagered with Von Poodall a bottle of wine yt [that] my next child will be a boy". The author then notes "And he won it also".

Gregory Wale is buried in the parish church of Little Shelford.

== See also ==
"Harston - History and Local Records of a Cambridgeshire Village" compiled by Helen C. Greene 1937

"In Memory of the Sounds of Shelford Parva in Cambridge" by Fanny Lucretia Wale. Cambridgeshire County Council Archives
