= Risby, Suffolk =

Village in Suffolk, England

Coordinates: 52.267°N 0.633°E

Risby
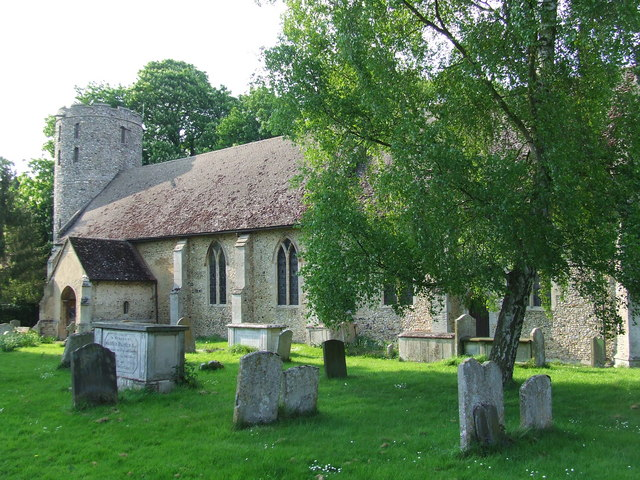
- St Giles church Risby

- Location within Suffolk
- Area: 11.35 km^{2} (4.38 sq mi)
- Population: 866 (2011)
  - Density: 76/km^{2} (200/sq mi)
- OS grid reference: TL7966
- District: West Suffolk
- Shire county: Suffolk
- Region: East
- Country: England
- Sovereign state: United Kingdom
- Post town: BURY ST EDMUNDS
- Postcode district: IP28
- Dialling code: 01284
- Police: Suffolk
- Fire: Suffolk
- Ambulance: East of England

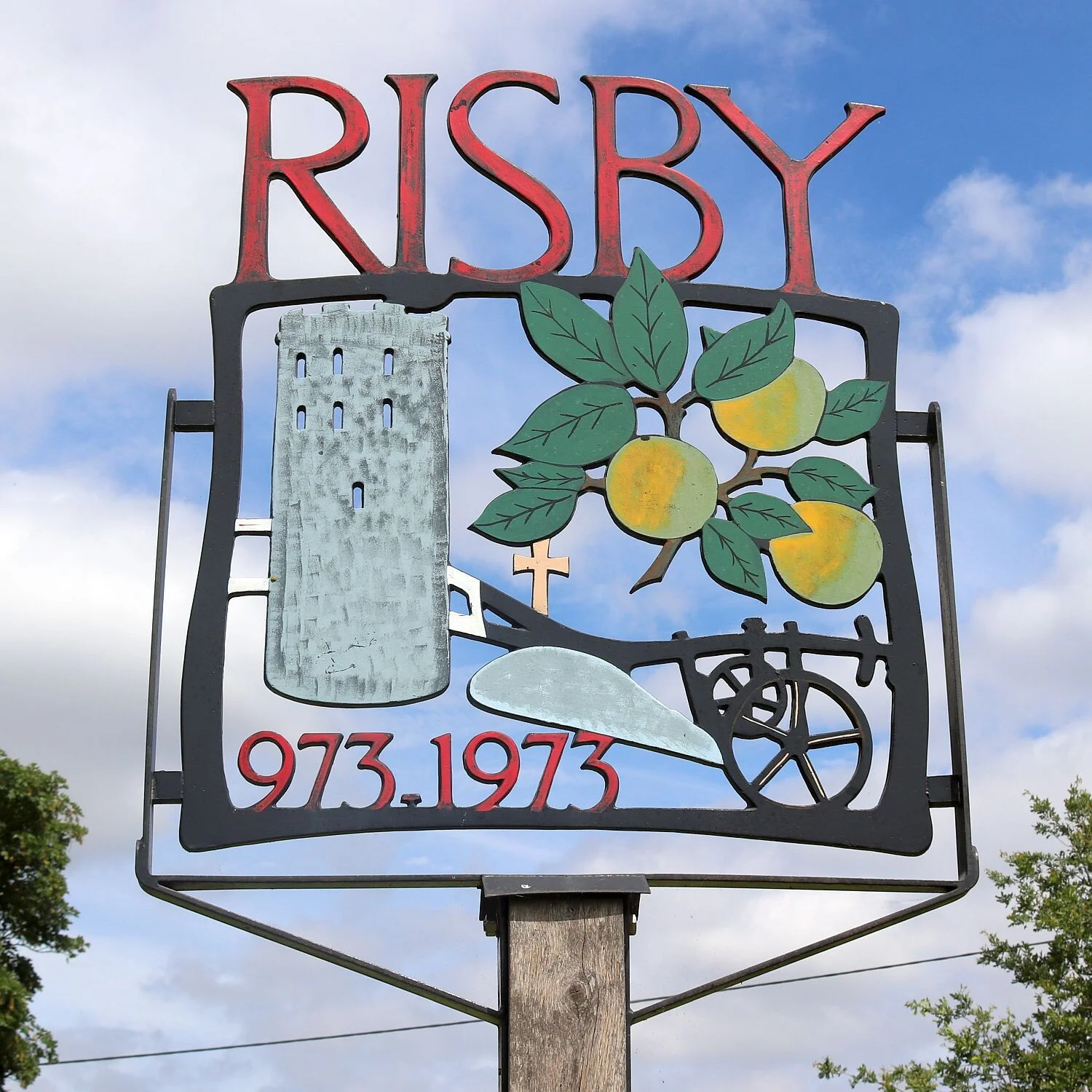
Risby Village Sign

Risby is a village and civil parish in the West Suffolk district of Suffolk in eastern England, located around 3 miles (4.8 km) west of Bury St. Edmunds, north of the A14 road. It is believed that the village was founded in about the tenth century, presumably on the strength of its having a Norse name, possibly Rȳðs - by "farm settlement at a clearing" and identical to Ryssby in Sweden. The traditional division or Hundred in which it stands is Thingoe, also a Norse name. The village now has a population of 840, increasing to 866 at the 2011 Census.

== History ==
Risby was recorded in Domesday as Rasbi and Risbi and Resebi. The Black Ditches are on the western edge of the parish and are believed to be the most easterly of a series of early Anglo-Saxon defensive earthworks built across the Icknield Way.

Saxham and Risby railway station 1 mile (1.6 km) south of the village, opened in 1854 and closed in 1967, though freight traffic ceased in 1964.

== Present day ==
Risby Church of England Primary School operates in the village which also has a village hall and pub.

St Giles Church lies opposite Quay's Farm behind a wall of flints and pink bricks and consists of nave, chancel and porch with traceried windows and one of the East Anglian round towers, in flint, containing three bells. The tower is plain up to above roof level, where a number of lancets appear below a shallow battlemented parapet. This tower has a texture of varicoloured flints, black, white, brown, glassy, dull, orange, not usually chipped or knapped, set in a buff-coloured mortar, and it rises with a slight taper from ground level and without obvious signs of coursing, as if built in one campaign. It is similar to the round tower at neighbouring Little Saxham. Inside the church, the tower arch seems rather tall for its width, and has roll mouldings about the arch and capitals marked with simple lozenge designs, as if Anglo-Saxon, but it may be from the Norman period in a style archaic for its time. The church guide suggests a date about 1000 to 1066. The space inside the round tower is surprisingly small, suggesting very thick walls. The interior of the church contains tablets to the Danby, Wastell, and Spark families; also a carved screen. On the nave floor, partly under a carpet, could be noted some arms of the Godfrey family in exactly the same style and material as those also noted for Godfrey at Lydd, Kent. The arms: A chevron between three pelicans' heads erased at the neck vulning themselves. The colour of the field is given as Sable, the chevron as Or

== Notable people associated with Risby ==
- Richard Spring, Baron Risby
- Thomas Wale
