= Consuming Passions (TV series) =

Australian cooking show

Consuming Passions is a five-minute cooking program, which ran for nine years and 450 episodes (1992 to 2001), before the Australian ABC's 7pm news bulletin. The program was hosted by chef and television producer Ian Parmenter.

The program aired in many countries including United Kingdom, Singapore and Ireland. Ian Parmenter won the Presenter's Award at the Festival de la TÈlÈ Gourmande in France. In 1996 Consuming Passions was awarded the Lucien Barriere Grand Prix, considered to be the major prize at the Festival de la TÈlÈ Gourmande.
