= Church of All Saints, Little Shelford =

Church of All Saints
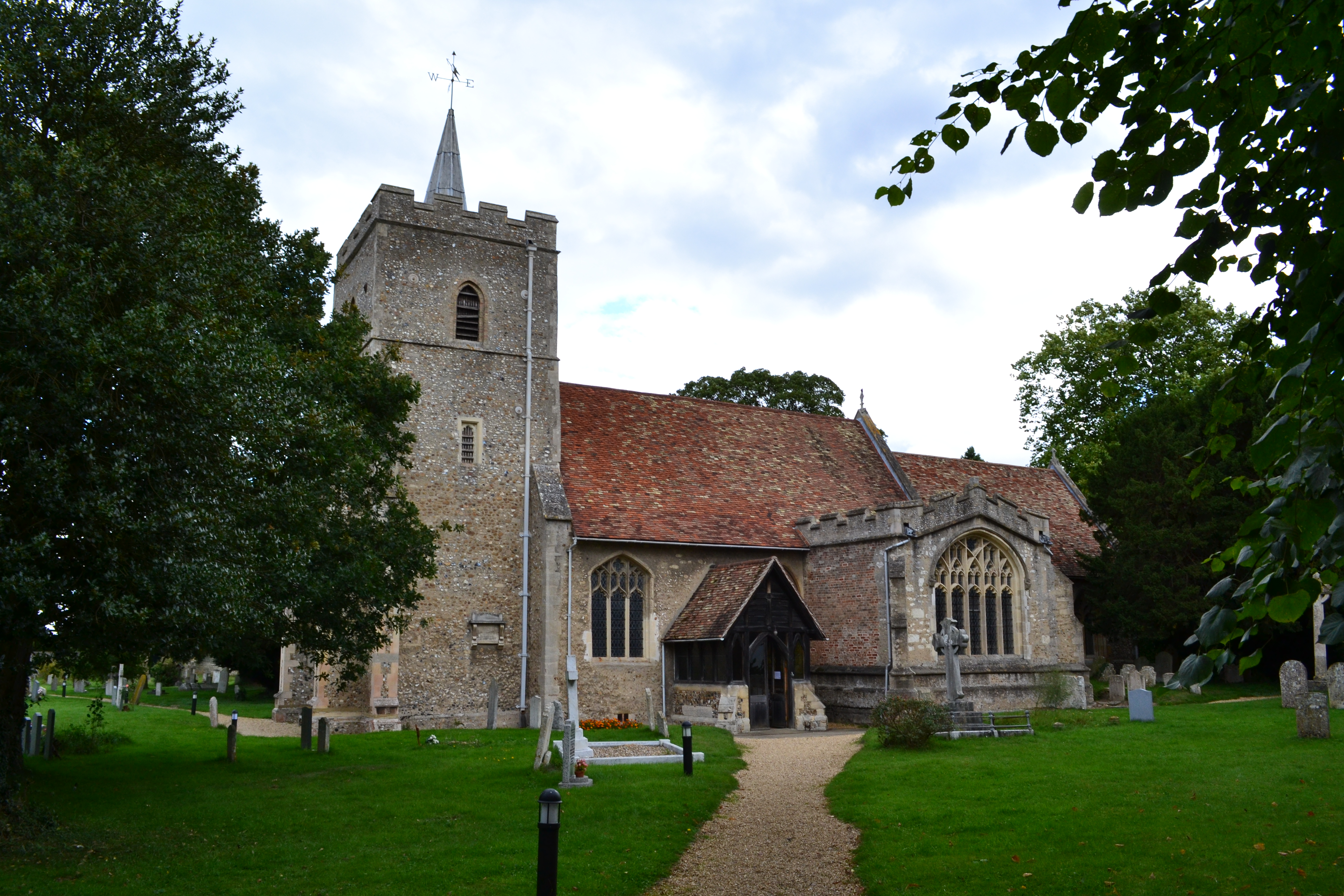
- Church of All Saints
- 52.1442°N 0.1227°E
- OS grid reference: TL 45345 51664
- Location: Church Street, Little Shelford, Cambridgeshire, CB22 5HG
- Country: England
- Denomination: Church of England
- Churchmanship: Evangelical
- Website: www.allsaintslittleshelford.org

History
- Status: Active
- Dedication: All Saints

Architecture
- Functional status: Parish Church
- Heritage designation: Grade II* listed
- Designated: 31 August 1962

Administration
- Diocese: Ely
- Archdeaconry: Cambridge
- Deanery: Granta
- Parish: Little Shelford

Clergy
- Rector: Simon Scott

The Church of All Saints is a Church of England parish church in Little Shelford, Cambridgeshire. The church is a Grade II* listed building, and dates from the 12th century.

== History ==
The village church stands by the crossroads with thirteen fine lime trees and an ancient market cross. It dates from pre-Norman times and is one of the oldest in the region. There are stones carved with Saxon plaitwork below a tiny Norman window, a carved coffin stone which may be Saxon in the porch, and in the chapel are four more stones which are probably Norman, like the queer animal with human arms propping up the 13th-century chancel arch. The chancel is 14th century. The small sacristy is entered by an ancient door in a rich arch is 15th century, and has holes of three piscinas in a windowsill. The arcaded oak pulpit is Jacobean. The font, like the tiny church spire, is 600 years old.

The stalls have on them the Arms of the de Freville family, Lords of the Manor here, whose 15th-century chapel (up three stairs) has some fine stone ornament on its piscina and on a canopy over the figure of a saint, with fragments of old glass in its windows. Some of the de Frevilles who died before their chapel was built appear in the chancel in stone and brass. Sir John de Freville, an alabaster tomb effigy with an inscription in Norman French, is here from the beginning of the 14th century, and from the end of it, in brass, are Robert de Freville and Claricia, with a greyhound and two dogs at their feet as they clasp hands, their son Thomas de Freville holding his wife's hand near them in a monumental brass of 1405.

A 15th-century rector, John Cate, has another fine brass portrait.

=== Present day ===
On 31 August 1962, the church was designated a Grade II* listed building.

In 1996, the church was planted from St Andrew the Great, Cambridge.

All Saints is within the Conservative Evangelical tradition of the Church of England, and it has passed resolutions to reject the ordination of women.

== Rectors ==
- 1324: John de Barenton
- 1380: Walter Knight
- 1393: Robert Cook
- 1408: Thomas Patele
- 1408: William Wynbyle
- 1445: John Catte
- 1473: Richard Roche
- 1473: Geoffrey Burrell
- 1494: Thomas Wardell
- 1530: Thomas Hinde
- 1540: Richard Swinbourne
- 1557: John Dale
- 1559: George Fuller
- 1580: John Scarfield
- 1591: Nicholas Richmond
- 1596: Roger Lunn
- 1623: George Wellbourne
- 1627: John Heath
- 1641: George Wigmore
- 1668: William Wells
- 1676: Richard Manninge
- 1709: Roger Gillingham
- 1756: Jeremy Pemberton
- 1758: Thomas Hirst
- 1791: Samuel Ingle
- 1795: John Swaine
- 1802: Martin Hogg
- 1806: Henry Finch
- 1849: William Law
- 1852: James Law
- 1893: Edwin Carr
- 1931: Edward Berwick
- 1950: Edward Sibson
- 1963: William Butler
- 1969: Eric Hague
- 1977: Stephen Taylor
- 1997: Christopher Ash
- 2005: Simon Scott

== Other clergy ==
- Tim Chapman (curate 2002-05; led a church plant to Sawston (Christ Church South Cambs) which left the Church of England in 2013)
- Tony Heywood (curate 2007-11; later Team Vicar in Thetford)
- Mark Smith (curate 2012-15 while chaplain at Peterhouse; later chaplain at Christ's, then Clare)
- Simon Tomkins (curate 2013-16; later Vicar in Audley, Staffordshire, before leaving the Church of England in 2023)
- Christopher Henderson (curate 2016-19; later Pastor of an AMiE church in Lymington, Hampshire)
- Edward Keene (curate 2020-23; later Vicar of St Nicholas in Stevenage)
