= Little Shelford =

Village in Cambridgeshire, England

Coordinates: 52.14267°N 0.1191°E

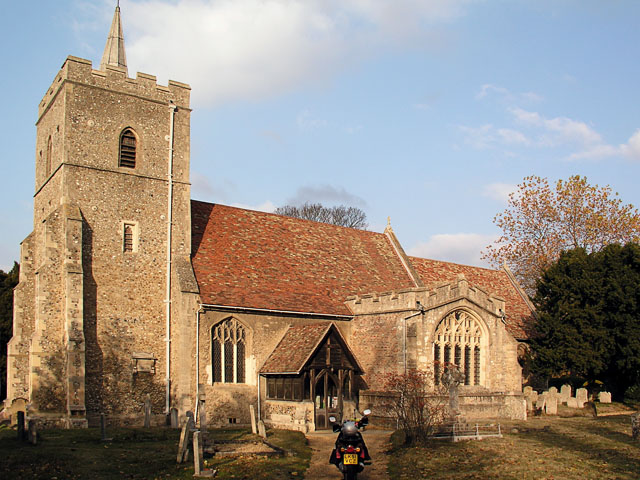
- All-Saints Church, Little Shelford

- Location within Cambridgeshire
- Population: 779 (2021)
- OS grid reference: TL451517
- District: South Cambridgeshire
- Shire county: Cambridgeshire
- Region: East
- Country: England
- Sovereign state: United Kingdom
- Post town: Cambridge
- Postcode district: CB22
- Dialling code: 01223
- Police: Cambridgeshire
- Fire: Cambridgeshire
- Ambulance: East of England
- UK Parliament: South Cambridgeshire

Little Shelford is a village located to the south of Cambridge, in the county of Cambridgeshire, in eastern England. The River Granta lies between it and the larger village of Great Shelford, and both are served by Shelford railway station in Great Shelford, which is on the West Anglia Main Line from Cambridge to London Liverpool Street. Little Shelford contains a Grade II Listed church, called All Saints Church, which dates back to the 12th Century. The village also has one pub, the Side Quest, on the High Street. It was opened in 2025 following the closure of the Navigator Thai restaurant. Little Shelford also contains a Fish & Chips shop called Winners, and Chinese takeaway.

The parish is mostly low-lying. It is bounded on the west by the M11 motorway and by field boundaries, and on the east by the River Cam. The highest point of the parish is Clunch Pit Hill, 31m (TL447499).

== Church and notable families ==
The Church of All Saints, Little Shelford is the village's Church of England parish church. The church is a Grade II* listed building, and dates from the 12th century.

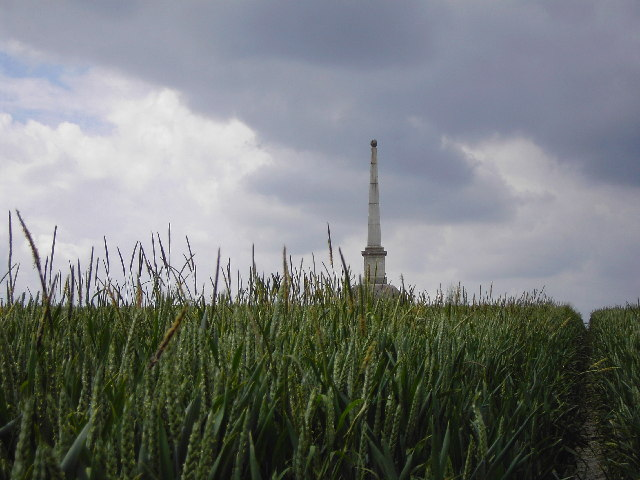
Gregory Wale's obelisk

Three tablets commemorate General Sir Charles Wale, who survived many battles to die at Little Shelford in 1848; his son, who fell at the Siege of Lucknow; and his eight grandsons and great-grandsons who died in World War I. Other notable members of the Wale family associated with Little Shelford include Thomas Wale, Gregory Wale and Henry Charles Wale. A monument to Gregory Wale can be seen on St Margaret's Mount to the west of the village.

=== Other notable people ===
- Michael Abercrombie (1912–1979)

== Locality ==
The de Freville manor house survives. One of many hidden ways leads past the manor and the farm where the river slips through a wood and kingfishers streak over an ancient mill pool.

The children's writer Philippa Pearce renamed the village "Little Barley", with Great Shelford becoming "Great Barley", the River Cam, which flows through the area, becoming the "River Say", and Cambridge being renamed "Castleford" and deprived of its university. These names are used in a number of her books, most famously Minnow on the Say (1955) and Tom's Midnight Garden (1958).
