= Sichuan Chengdu Shishi High School =

Public secondary school in Chengdu, Sichuan, China

- 四川省成都市石室中学
- 93 Wenmiao Front St, Qingyang District, Chengdu, Sichuan, China, 610093; 30° 39′ 13.27″ N, 104° 03′ 21.61″ E Chengdu, Sichuan; China

Information
- Other name: Sichuan Chengdu No. 4 High School (四川省成都市第四中学)
- Former name: Wenweng Shishi (文翁石室)
- Established: 143–141 BC, 194 AD, 1661, became a modern school in 1902, and a middle school in 1904
- President: Daosheng Mao 毛道生
- Campus: Urban
- Website: cdshishi.net

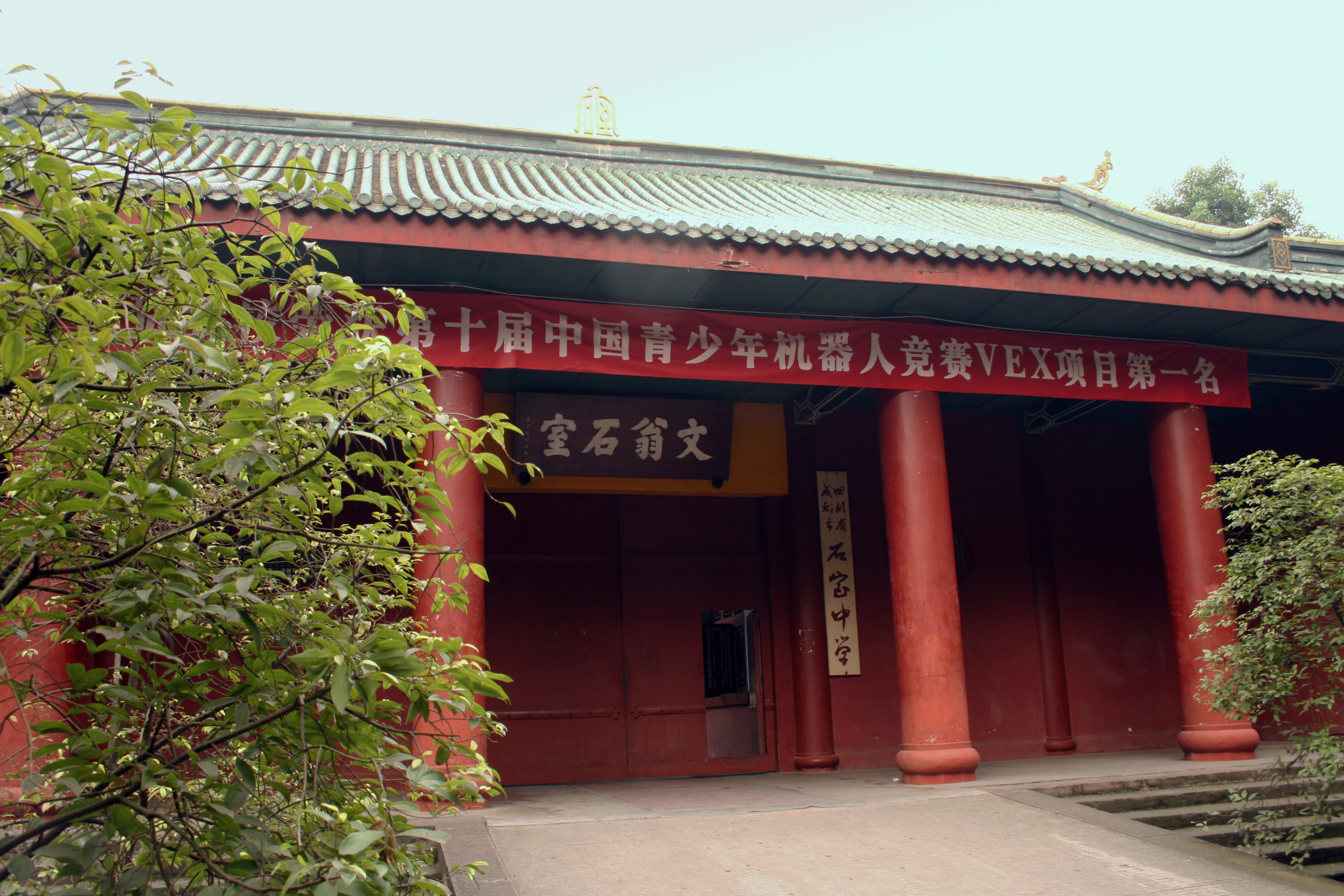
Main Gate

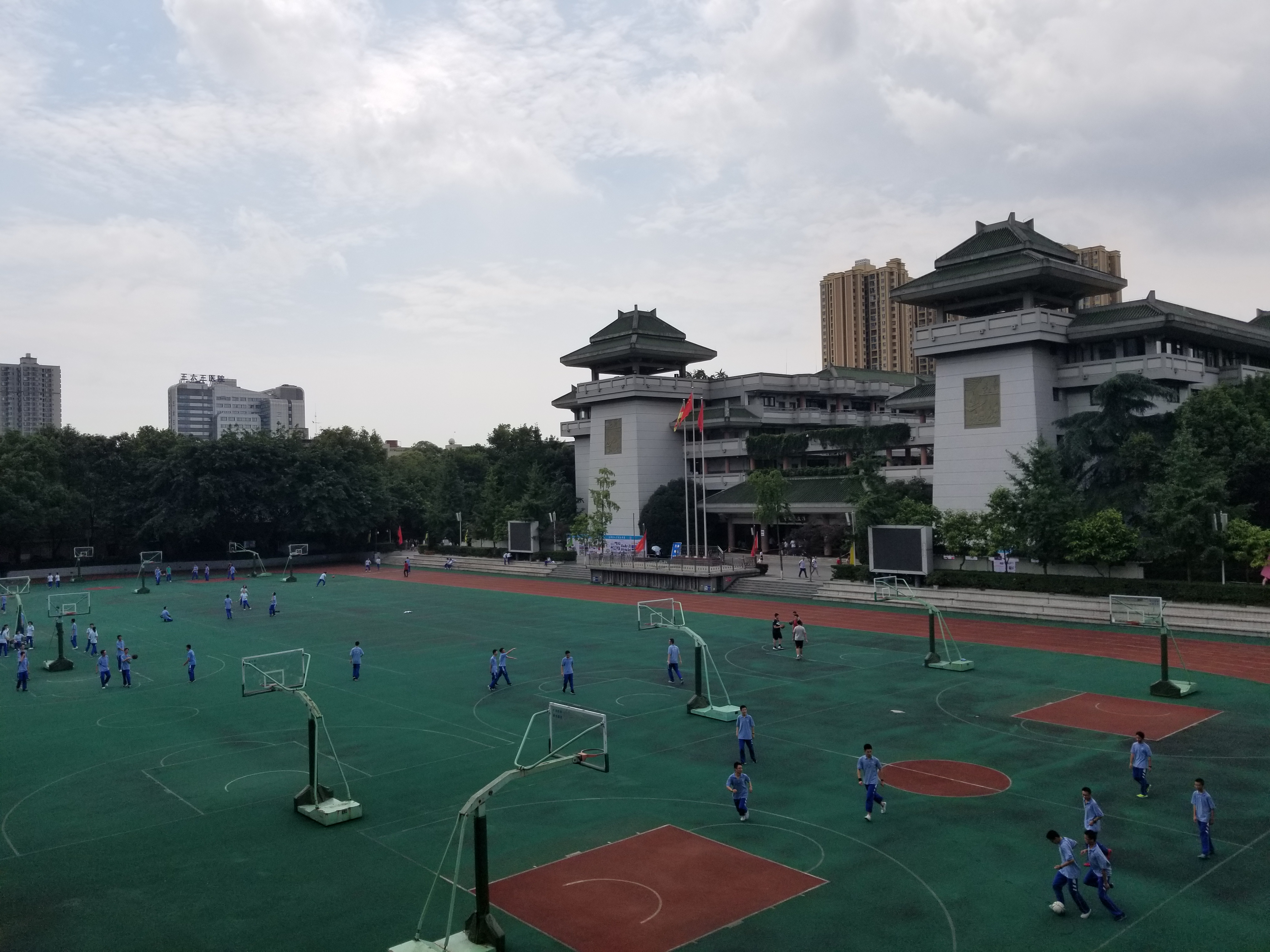
Playground and Main Teaching Building

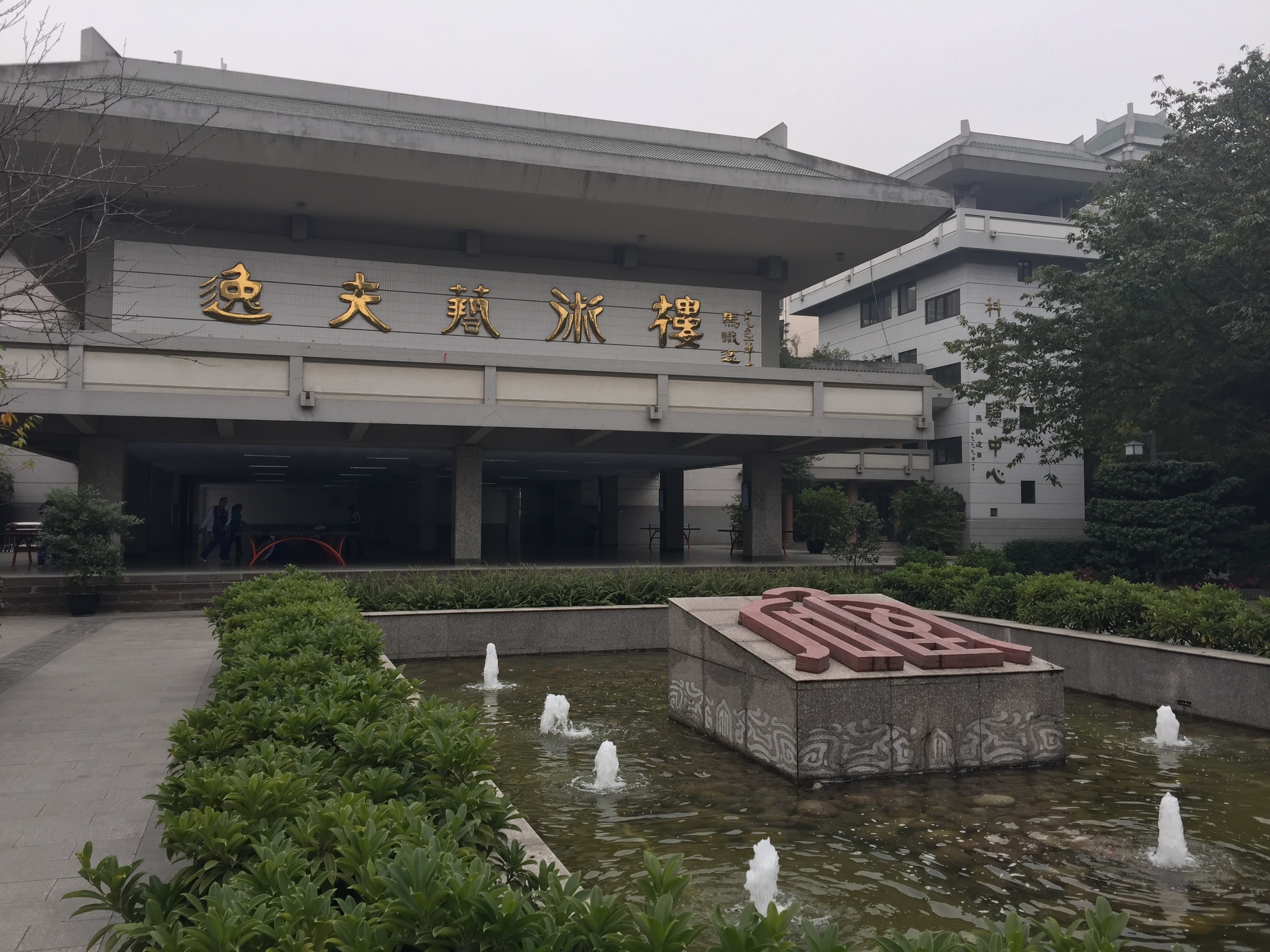
Sir Run Run Shaw Hall for Arts (逸夫藝術樓)

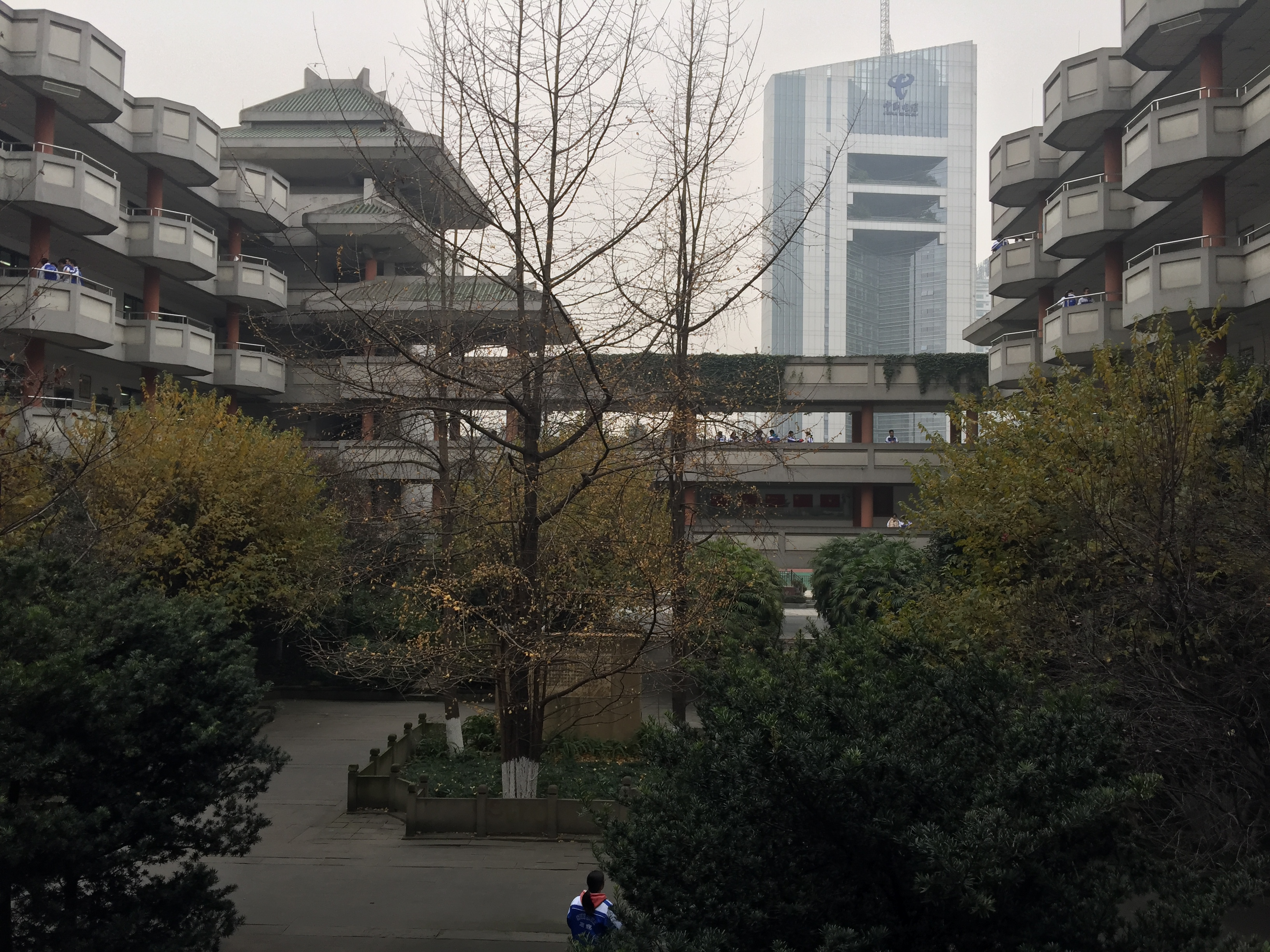
Main courtyard

Chengdu Shishi High School (simplified Chinese: 成都石室中学; : traditional Chinese: 成都石室中學, romanised: Chéngdū Shíshì Zhōngxué), also known as Wenweng Shishi (文翁石室), is a public secondary school in Chengdu, Sichuan, China.

Tracing its origins back to the "Shijun Junxue" (School of Shu Commandery) founded by Governor Wen Weng during the Han dynasty (c. 141 BC), it is widely recognized as the first local government-run school in China and the world. It is also one of the few schools globally to have remained on the same site for over 2,160 years.

== History ==
Between the years 143 and 141 BC, Wén Wēng (文翁), the Western Han dynasty governor of Shu Commandery (modern Sichuan), established the first Chinese public school, Shujun Junxue (Shu Commandery Academy, 蜀郡郡学). The great Han dynasty scholar Sima Xiangru studied at the school.

During the Eastern Han dynasty, the school was devastated by fire. It was rebuilt in 199 AD, and continued through China's imperial dynasties as Yizhou Zhouxue (益州州学, Yizhou Prefecture School), Chengdu Fuxue (Chengdu Prefecture Academy, 成都府学), and other names. Shu Shi Jing (a form of Thirteen Classics, literally Shu Carved Stone of Classics, 蜀石经) was completed in Chengdu Fuxue in Northern Song, after more than 230 years of intermittent carving. In the 17th century, as the Ming dynasty collapsed, the rebel force of Zhang Xianzhong (1606–1647) devastated Sichuan and the school was destroyed.

In 1661, early in the Qing dynasty, the Chengdu Fuxue (prefecture school of Chengdu) was reestablished on the site, and became a leading school in Sichuan. Jinjiang Academy, which later became Sichuan University, was established at the school in 1740. Chengdu Fuxue became Chengdu Normal School (成都师范学堂) under the new educational system introduced in 1902. It then became Chengdu Middle School (成都府中学堂) in 1904. It was renamed again to Chengdu Shishi Middle School (成都石室中学) in February 1940, and in mid-1948 was identified as a model for secondary schools nationwide.

In September 1952, after the establishment of the People's Republic of China, the school changed its name to Chengdu No. 4 Middle School (成都第四中学). During the Cultural Revolution, the school was devastated for the third time; none of the Qing dynasty buildings still exist. It returned to its former name in April 1983.

Shishi ranks among the top 100 high schools in China. Its admission is highly selective, and attracts applications each year from both local and neighboring middle schools. Most Shishi students scored among the top 10% of their peers on the junior middle school exit exam.

The school celebrates its anniversary on November 11.

== Buildings ==
The school has two campuses. The Wenmiao campus comprises the historic headquarters located on historic headquarters located on Wenmiao Front Street in the Qingyang District, situated on the original Han dynasty site. The Beihu campus is a modern residential campus located in the Chenghua District, established to expand the school's educational resources.

== Emblem ==
The school's emblem consists of a double-circle frame enclosing a central bell-shaped logo formed by the Seal script (篆书) characters for "Shishi" (石室). This design carries a triple symbolic significance. The bell, an ancient Chinese vessel for timekeeping and music, symbolizes the school's "uninterrupted music and song" (弦歌不辍) for over two millennia and the preservation of Wen Weng’s educational spirit.

The bell serves as a reminder for students to "cherish time" and pursue an upright, noble character with a strong sense of social responsibility.

The combination of ancient Seal script with modern geometric circles reflects the school's deep cultural roots and the innovative, excellence-seeking spirit of the contemporary Shishi community.

== Notable alumni ==
- Guo Moruo (郭沫若): scientist, sociologist, former dean of the Chinese Academy of Sciences, former vice-chairman of Standing Committee of the National People's Congress.
- Li Yimang (李一氓): revolutionist, former member of the Central Advisory Commission of the Chinese Communist Party
- Wu Guozhen: former Shanghai mayor
- Ma Zhiming (马志明): mathematician, academician of the Chinese Academy of Science, former vice-president of the China Mathematics Association, academician of Third World Academy of Science, former vice-president and executive of IMU
- He Lin (贺麟): cell biologist, academician of the Chinese Academy of Science
- Li Jieren (李劼人): litterateur, former Chengdu mayor
- Li Hao (李卓皓): Professor of Economics, University of British Columbia
- Jung Chang: Chinese-born British writer now living in London, best known for her family autobiography, Wild Swans
- Zhong Shan (钟山): Academician of the Chinese Academy of Engineering and the International Academy of Astronautics
