= John Langhorne (King's School Rochester) =

Langhorne whilst vicar of Lamberhust. Taken on doorstep of Lamberhurst Vicarage

John Langhorne (1836 – December 1911) was headmaster of The King's School, Rochester and an educational innovator there. He has been called "Lamberhurst's first local historian"

== Parentage ==
Born in Giggleswick, Yorkshire, United Kingdom, Langhorne's father was John Langhorne (1805–1881; referred to hereafter with the term "senior", to distinguish him from his son) of Haber House, Crosby Ravensworth, Cumbria. John Langhorne (senior) was born at Haber Farm and was schooled at Shap and Sedbergh School, subsequently becoming master at Beetham. He became mathematics and writing master of The Free Grammar School of King Edward VI for thirty years. He served most of his time under headmaster George Ash Butterton. He managed the School Accounts from 1839 to 1845, but they were found to be "so in accurate and confused" that Mr Robinson had to enter them in the book. This may have been because "in 1840 the … number of boys in the High School learning writing and arithmetic under Langhorne was greater than one man could efficiently attend to". Langhorne resigned "almost immediately" at the replacement of headmaster Butterton by John Blakiston in about 1859.

John Langhorne (senior) was the cousin of Thomas Langhorne of High Dalebanks, Crosby Ravensworth who was the founder of Loretto School. He subsequently retired to Haber House in Crosby Ravensworth to pursue farming.

His mother was Elizabeth Wildman (1806–1878). She was the daughter of Mary Clark and William Wildman, a farmer from Giggleswick. They may have been related to John Wildman (born 1811) bookseller and publisher in Settle. (John and William Wildman were rather distantly related. William's grandparents William Wildman and Elizabeth Frankland were John's great-grandparents.)

The Langhorne family claimed descent from Major General Rowland Laugharne

== Early life and Cambridge University ==
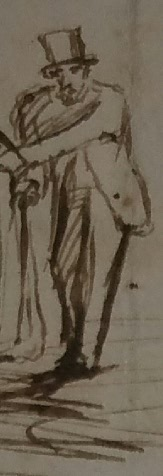
William Long, father of Henrietta Long (junior)

He attended Giggleswick School. In 1855 he won the Essay prize (see publications)

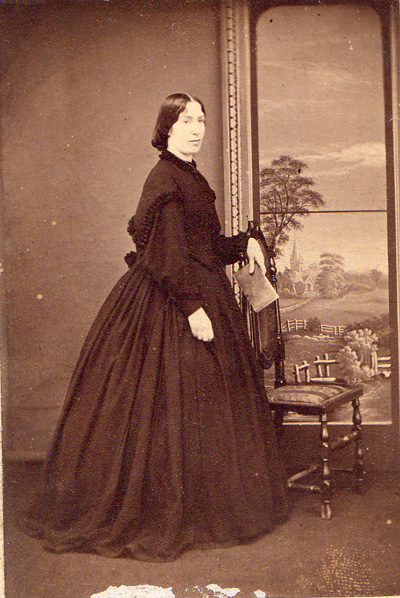
Henrietta Long of Harston Hall, Cambridgeshire (1836 - 1869), first wife of John Langhorne

He attended Christ's College, Cambridge where he was awarded a Bachelor of Arts degree on 31 March 1859. He gained a first class in the Classical tripos. He took his MA in 1862 (Christ's College). It was whilst resident at Cambridge that he met his first wife Henrietta Long of Harston Hall, Harston and Landemere Hall, Thorpe-le-Soken. Henrietta was the daughter of William Long and Henrietta Bridge. Her brother Harry Allan Long died in 1883 at Kimberley, South Africa aged 40.

In 1862 he was ordained a deacon in 1862 and a priest in 1864 - in between he was curate at Hildenborough and Tudeley

After leaving Cambridge, he worked for a year in Wakefield.

His sister Mary Langhorne died on 17 January 1863 aged 24. In 1873 his other sister Jane married Christopher Bateson Maudsley (sic), brother of the founder of the Maudesley hospital.

== Tonbridge School ==
From 1860 to 1877 he was a classics master and housemaster at Tonbridge School, Kent.

The following poem was written about John Langhorne by W.O.Hughes-Hughes (probably whilst a student at Tonbridge School):

Ego sum Johannes Ursus
Et te puniam si ursus
facis tumultum
Gravis puer! num silebis?
Immo vero non-sedebis
Si me provocabis multum.

Langhorne was often referred to as "the Bear" (Ursus in Latin). The piece is written from the teacher's perspective:

I am John the Bear
and I will punish you if you are you are a bear
that makest turmoil
Unpleasant boy! Will not be silent?
To the contrary you shall not sit down
if you provoke me greatly.

The following account of his time at Tonbridge School comes from the "Hill Side Letter", the journal of his House at Tonbridge School.

A year after leaving Cambridge, where he had been a scholar at Christ's college, [he] arrived at Tonbridge in 1860 to teach Classics to the fifth form. Originally from Giggleswick in Yorkshire, he had spent the year since university teaching in Wakefield and had married Henrietta Long. They moved into Hanover House, a decaying Elizabethan house immediately opposite the new school (Old Library) from where they witnessed the pulling down of the old school buildings and the raising of the present ones. Three sons were born in the next few years …. but then Henrietta died, leaving the children motherless and John needing to employ a housekeeper.

By 1866 he had moved to Bordyke. At this time "it was necessary for him to advertise for pupils and a contemporary leaflet shows him charging 40-50 guineas for 'house, board and washing'".

The "Hill Side Letter" states that he was known at Tonbridge as "Fling". It quotes the following poem composed by an erstwhile student:

"There in the fifth form room, well skilled to swear
The mighty Langhorne teaches from his chair
A man serene he is and stern to view
Satirically inclined and witty too
Well have the fellows earned the rows to trace
When in the morn they look upon his face
But of the will a hearty laugh provoke
By witty sayings or a harmless joke" (1870)

In October 1877 he left to take up his new position at Kings, Rochester. Around this time a contemporary student quoted in the "Hill Side Letter" described John Langhorne thus:

His loss will be very deeply felt. By his manly and vigorous training he has done much to form aright the character of the school: and many now doing well in the world must look back gratefully to the years spent under his care. A perfect disciplinarian, a thorough and painstaking teacher, he was one whom it was impossible not to respect and admire… the school will always have in him a true and steadfast friend.

== King's School, Rochester ==
In about 1877 John Langhorne became Headmaster at Kings School, Rochester.

The following announcement was made in The Guardian newspaper on 7 April 1893: "The Dean and Canons of Rochester Cathedral have now at their disposal the headmastership of Rochester Cathedral Grammar School, vacant by the resignation of John Langhorne".

== Lamberhurst and retirement ==
He left Rochester in 1893 to become vicar of Lamberhurst and remained there until his death in Ticehurst.

== Family, marriage and children ==
On 1 August 1861 he married Henrietta Long of Harston Hall in her parish church of Harston, Chesterton, Cambridgeshire. See image. Henrietta Long was the daughter of William Long "gentleman" of Harston and Henrietta Bridge. She was a direct descendant of John Littel Bridge of Shudy Camps and Gregory Wale. Henrietta Langhorne died in March 1869 at Tunbridge.

He had eight children in total, three from his first marriage and five from his second. Six of his children were educated at the King's School, Rochester.

The first child from his first marriage were:

- John Langhorne (1862–1925). This John Langhorne worked at Loretto School (which had been founded by Thomas Langhorne, a cousin of John Langhorne of Giggleswick School) and then became headmaster of the John Watson's Institution in Edinburgh. This organisation was based at the building that is now the modern art gallery in Edinburgh. A bronze plaque to him in that building was present until its conversion to a gallery.
- William Henry Langhorne (born 1865) who became Governors' Exhibitioner, St Bartholomew's Hospital, London. Following a head injury following a fall from a bus he changed career and in 1884 joined the Royal Irish Constabulary. He was District Inspector, Brandon 1904-1910 and County Inspector, South Tipperary from 1910 - 1920.
- Brigadier General Harold Stephen Langhorne (1866–1932).

John Langhorne's second wife was Frances ("Fanny") Yorke of the Yorke family of Forthampton Court of Tewkesbury. Her father James Charles Yorke of Gwernant House, Wales had been a Captain in the fifth Dragoon Guards.

The children from his second marriage were

- Charles Langhorne (who went to Madras to join his uncle Algy Yorke's import and export business, but became blind and returned to England)
- Ursula Vansittart Langhorne (who assisted in the Parish of Lamberhurst and the family home, worked as a governess, and won prizes for breeding Persian cats)
- Herbert Yorke Langhorne (King's scholar Rochester, 1888, Tancred Scholar Christ College Cambridge, BA 1898, Headmaster of the Central Modern School, Lahore in 1906), and headmaster of Aldenham Park School, Salop, 1933)
- Brigadier James Archibald Dunboyne Langhorne
- Major-General Algernon Philip Yorke Langhorne.

== Publications ==
- "Essay", 2 April 1855. Supplement to the Settle Chronicle, Settle
- "John Worthington", April 1896, Notes and Queries, Oxford University Press, page 315. Article concerning an earlier incumbent at Lamberhurst
- "John Worthington", November 1895, Notes and Queries, Oxford University Press, page 408
- Letter to editor, Westmorland Gazette, 18 October 1897

== Sources ==
- Bell, Edward Allen (1912). A history of Giggleswick School from its foundation, 1499 to 1912. Leeds: R. Jackson.
