= Andrew Archibald Paton =

Andrew Archibald Paton FRGS (19 March 1811, in Edinburgh – 5 April 1874) was a British diplomat, orientalist, and author of travel books and novels.

== Biography ==
At the age of twenty-five he landed at Naples, and walked thence, with staff and knapsack, to Vienna. Thereafter travelling up and down among the Eastern European states, and also in Syria and Egypt, he acquired an accurate and extensive insight into the manners, customs, and political life of the East, which, with descriptions of the countries themselves, he communicated to the public in an interesting series of books.

From 1839 to 1843 he was employed in Egypt and then Syria. In 1843 he was appointed acting consul-general in Serbia. In 1858 he became vice-consul at Missolonghi in Greece. In 1859 he was transferred to Lübeck and in May 1862 appointed consul at Ragusa and at Bocca di Cattaro.

His book Highlands and Islands of the Adriatic gives an interesting account of Signor Arnieri, the principal land owner of the island of Korčula. Paton's book Researches on the Danube and the Adriatic mentions the significance given by the people of Ragusa to the mathematician Marino Ghetaldi. Paton's literary work is of interest for his book on the life and work of Stendhal and published correspondence with Sir Austen Henry Layard.

Henry James wrote an unfavourable, unsigned review in The Nation for Paton's book on Stendhal.

On 27 April 1852 Paton married Eliza Calvert at Saint Anne Soho, Westminster, London; they had a daughter Eliza Rebecca Anne Paton.

== Selected publications ==
- 1843-72: letters (20) to Sir Austen Layard
- 1844 The modern Syrians; or, Native Society in Damascus, Aleppo, and the mountains of the Druses, from notes made in those parts during the years 1841.2-3
- 1845 : Servia, Youngest Member of the European Family or, a residence in Belgrade and travels in the Highlands and Woodlands of the Interior, during the years 1843 and 1844.
- 1849 : Highlands and islands of the Adriatic : including Dalmatia, Croatia, and the southern provinces of the Austrian Empire
- 1851 : The Goth and the Hun, or, Transylvania, Debreczin, Pesth, and Vienna, in 1850
- 1851 : The mamelukes: a romance of life in grand Cairo .. (Volume 1)
- 1851 : The mamelukes: a romance of life in grand Cairo .. (Volume 2)
- 1851 : The mamelukes: a romance of life in grand Cairo .. (Volume 3)
- 1855 : The Bulgarian, the Turk, and the German
- 1860 : Melusina, a new Arabian night's entertainment
- 1861 : Researches on the Danube and the Adriatic : or, Contributions to the modern history of Hungary and Transylvania, Dalmatia and Croatia, Servia and Bulgaria ISBN 1154943208
- 1863 : A history of the Egyptian revolution, from the period of the Mamelukes to the death of Mohammed Ali; from Arab and European memoirs, oral tradition, and local research
- 1867 : Sketches of the ugly side of human nature
- 1870 : A history of the Egyptian revolution, from the period of the Mamelukes to the death of Mohammed Ali; from Arab and European memoirs, oral tradition, and local research (Volume 1)
- 1870 : A history of the Egyptian revolution, from the period of the Mamelukes to the death of Mohammed Ali; from Arab and European memoirs, oral tradition, and local research (Volume 2)
- 1874 : Henry Beyle (otherwise de Stendahl); a critical and biographical study aided by original documents and unpublished letters from the private papers of the family of Beyle
