= Henry John Wale =

English writer

Henry John Wale (1827 – 14 March 1892 in London) was an English author, soldier and church minister. He came from Little Shelford near Cambridge and was the son of General Sir Charles Wale. He served in the Crimea.

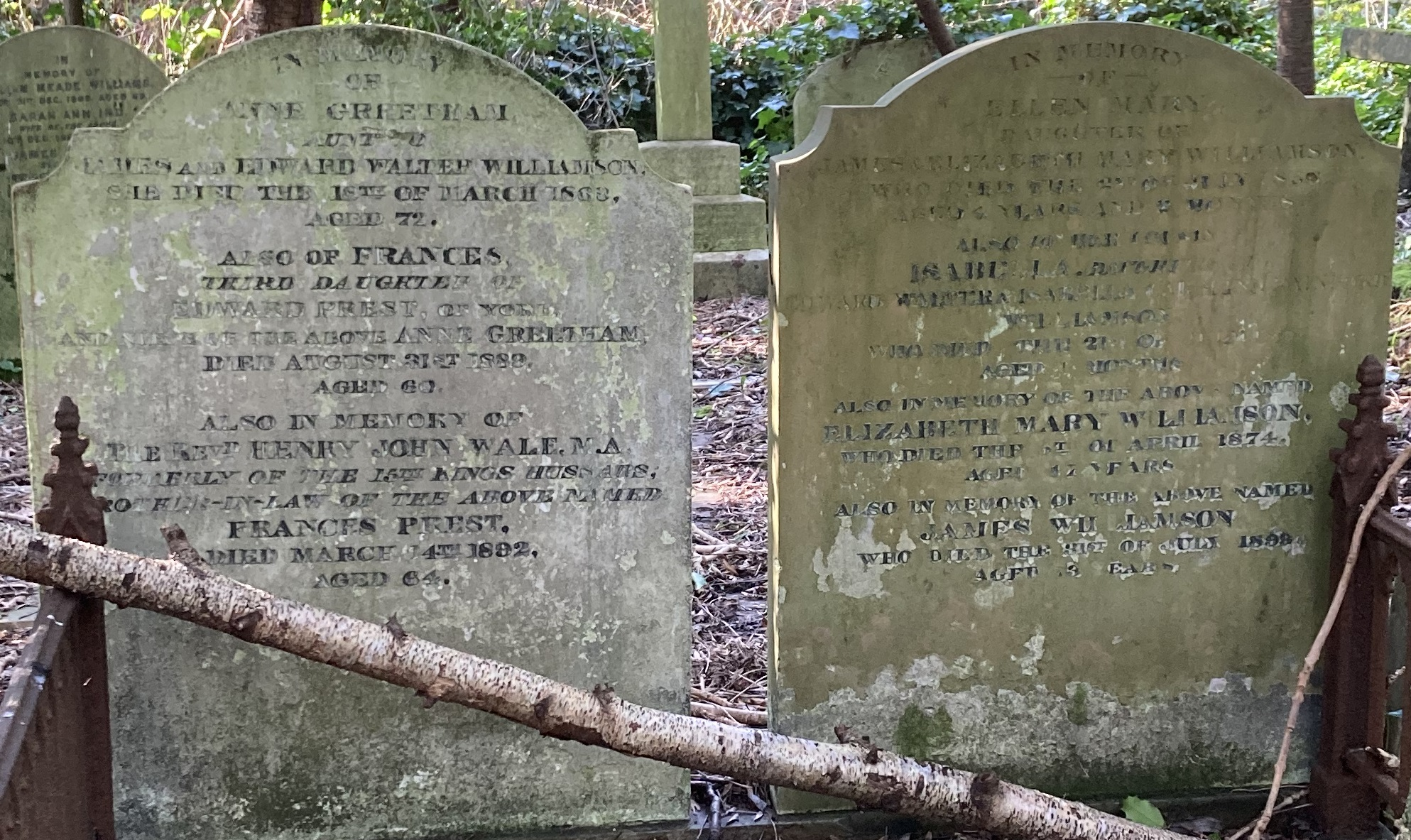
Grave of Henry John Wale in Highgate Cemetery (west side)

He was the tenth and youngest son of Major General Sir Charles Wale and his third wife Henrietta Brunt. He went to school in Bury St Edmunds, and was admitted to Magdalene College, Cambridge, Cambridgeshire, England, on 9 December 1857, where he gained a B.A. in 1861 and an M.A. in 1864.

He was a Lieutenant in the 15th Hussars 1845–51; Scots Grays, 1854–7; served in the Crimea. Ord. deacon (Salisbury) 1861; priest, 1862; C. of Holy Trinity, Weymouth, 1861–3. C. of Ringwood, Hants., 1863–5. R. of Folksworth, Hunts., 1865–78. Organising Secretary, S.P.G., dio. of Rochester, 1881–92. Married Caroline, dau. of Edward Prest, of York, and had issue.

== Publications ==
- My Grandfather's Pocket Book. From A.D. 1701 to 1796. London: Chapman and Hall. 1883.
- Sword and Surplice; or, Thirty Years' Reminiscences of the Army and the Church. An Autobiography Published by David Bogue, London 1880
