= Harold Stephen Langhorne =

British Army general

Brigadier-General Harold Stephen Langhorne CB CMG
- Born: 17 September 1866; Tonbridge, Kent
- Died: 26 June 1932 (aged 65); Barnwood, Gloucester
- Military career
- Allegiance: United Kingdom
- Branch: British Army
- Service years: 1885–
- Unit: Royal Artillery
- Conflicts: Second Boer War; First World War

Harold Stephen Langhorne CB CMG (17 September 1866 – 26 June 1932) was an officer in the Royal Army Ordnance Corps of the British Army who served in India, Burma, Hong Kong, South Africa and France.

== Early life ==
He was the son of Reverend John Langhorne, headmaster of King's School, Rochester and Henrietta Long of Harston Hall, Harston, Cambridgeshire and Landermere Hall, Thorpe-le-Soken.

He attended Tonbridge School and then went to the King's School, Rochester. He went to the Royal Military Academy, Woolwich, London, England, which was established in 1741 to educate the military branch of the Board of Ordnance to produce officers for the Artillery and Engineers. He entered the Royal Artillery in September 1885, and by 1890 served in India.

== Family ==
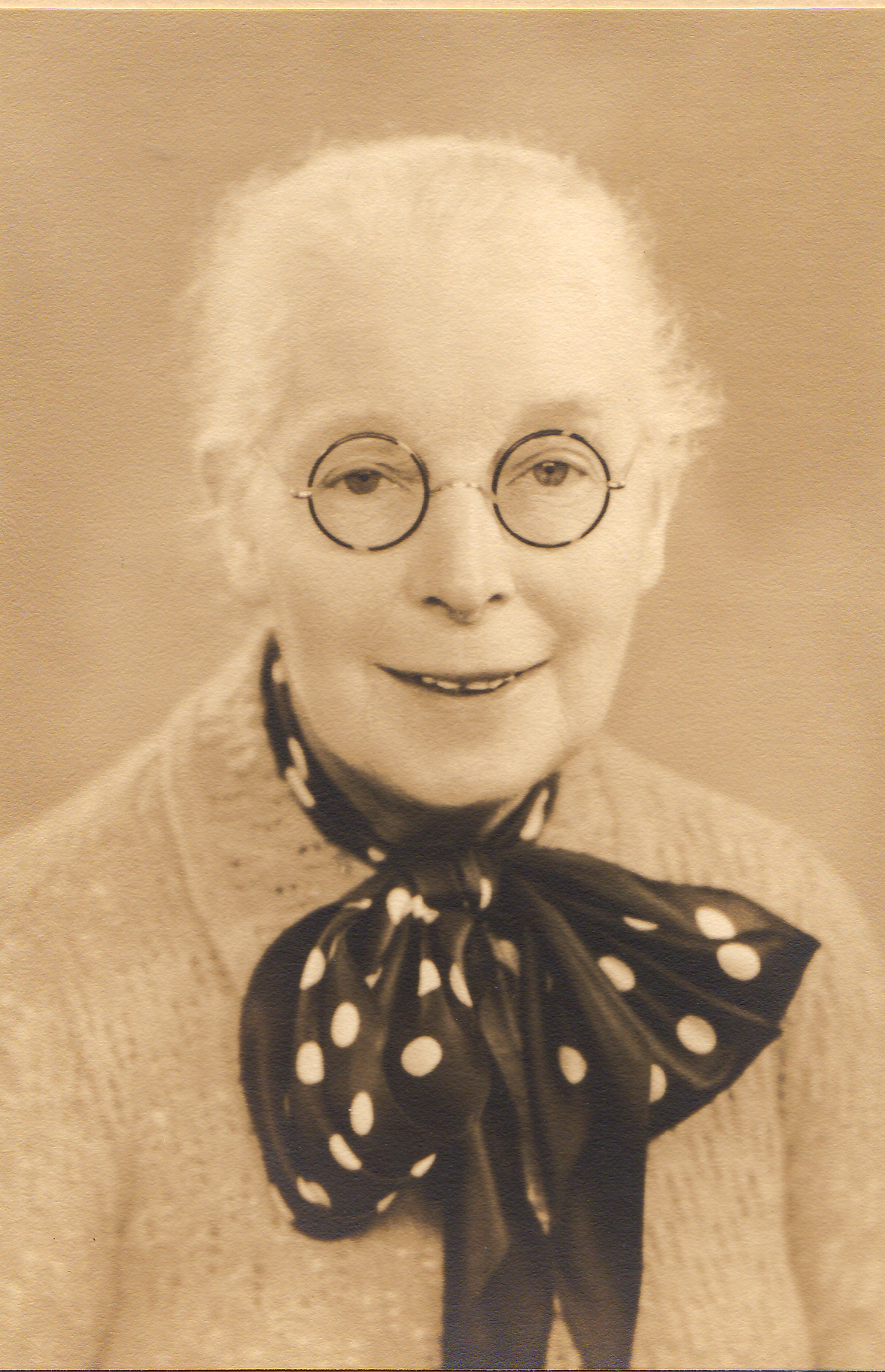
Amy Helen Francis Hadow (born Toghoo, Bengal 21 December 1867 died Cheltenham, Gloucester, England 17 July 1953). Wife of Langhorne.

Harold Stephen Langhorne met his future wife after he fell from a horse during a polo match in India. In order to recover from the fall he was seated beside her and her father Major General Frederick Edward Hadow, believed to have been a senior officer of the Hyderabad Contingent Force. He married Amy Helen Francis Hadow (born Toghoo, Bengal 21 December 1867 died Cheltenham, Gloucester, England 17 July 1953) at Allahabad, Uttar Pradesh, India on 28 December 1891.

They had five children:

- Francis Harold Langhorne (born 1892 Aurangabad, Deccan, India), emigrated to Slocan junction, British Columbia and signed up with the Canadian Expeditionary Force at Valcartier on 18 September 1914. He was killed in action at Cambrai on 29 September 1918 whilst a Lieutenant with the 2nd Canadian Mounted Rifles (British Columbia Regiment))
- Ursula Margaret (Peggy) Langhorne (born Ticehurst, Kent in September 1894)
- Edward Walter Langhorne (born 1900 Hong Kong joined the Royal Artillery, served in Mesopotamia and India.
- Hilda Mary Langhorne (born Harbledon, Canterbury 15 April 1901 died 1999) lived with her parents in Egypt, joined the ARP in 1939 and worked as an ambulance driver in London during the blitz.
- Elizabeth Langhorne (born 23 October 1911 at the Royal Army Clothing Depot, Pimlico, London died Gloucester 1999).

== Career and later life ==
Langhorne served in the Royal Artillery, where he was promoted to Captain (1895), Major (1904), Lieutenant-Colonel (1907), and Colonel (1914). His ordnance formation was as follows: Ordnance Officer 4th Class 1896–1902, 3rd Class 1902–7, 2nd Class 1907–14, 1st class 1914.

He served in the Hyderabad contingent and, by 1893, in Madras. (ref: The Register of Tonbridge School, from 1820 to 1893 page 206. On 1 April 1896 he was seconded for service with the Inspection Branch. He was responsible for supervising munitions in Hong Kong (c. 1900). At the close of the Boer war he was sent to South Africa. He also worked with munitions at Ormskirk, Lancashire.

Prior to the outbreak of and during the beginning of the first world war he was working and living at the Royal Army Clothing Depot, Grosvenor Road, Pimlico, London. His daughter, Elizabeth Vowles, who lived there during the first world war described the depot and his role there thus:

he was literally a factory manager, making clothing, from boots and socks up to ceremonial scarlet uniforms... After the Boer war till a scramble to enlist in 1914 it sufficed one clothing factory to keep it (the British Army) clad. ... By 1915 or so my father, in uniform would bring in his two officers to lunch with us, suggesting pressure in the office. The factory employed civilians in the sawing shed for packing-cases and women in the sewing rooms. By 1916 we were ejected from the Royal Army Clothing Department and the whole place given up to machines and packing; father must have been busy well before that in organising extended work in the hugh Olympia and the White City. He was still I suppose working there in 1917 as he was living at home but by 1918 he was constantly away, at first in France behind the lines I suppose laying lines for supply to the Big Push which finally drove the Germans back by November 1918.

He was made a Companion of the Order of the Bath (CB) in June 1915 and promoted to temporary brigadier general in January 1917 and later sent to Salonika in the East Mediterranean. According to his daughter the reason for his being there was "presumably the remaining war to control Palestine and Cairo" and its preparations. "Salonika was the main base, but he certainly went beyond that."

On 29 September 1918 his oldest son Lieutenant Francis Harold Langhorne was killed in action while serving with the 2nd Canadian Mounted Rifles in northern France. After the first world war he visited the grave at Borlon wood, arranging for an epitaph to be added.

He went to Cairo in 1919 as deputy director of Ordnance Supplies for General Edmund Allenby, 1st Viscount Allenby. Based at Halouan, outside Cairo, and Heliopolis. His postal address was the Eden Palace Hotel, Cairo. As part of his work he had to travel to Tanta. In the summer of 1923 his wife suffered a bad bout of typhoid in Cairo. He came home from Cairo and retired to Gloucestershire in 1924 to pursue gardening.

He played polo, cricket and tennis and was a keen pianist, enjoying in particular the works of Sibelius and Debussy. He was interested in the ideas of Ruskin.

He received the following awards: Commander of the Order of the Bath (1915), Commander of Michael and George (1918). According to an account of his life left by his daughter he declined a knighthood on the basis that "he didn't like the company he'd be in and above all, wouldn't shake hands with Maundy Gregory for the fear the mud would stick to his!".

Langhorne died in Barnwood, Gloucester, England, 26 June 1932.

== Plaque in Rochester Cathedral ==
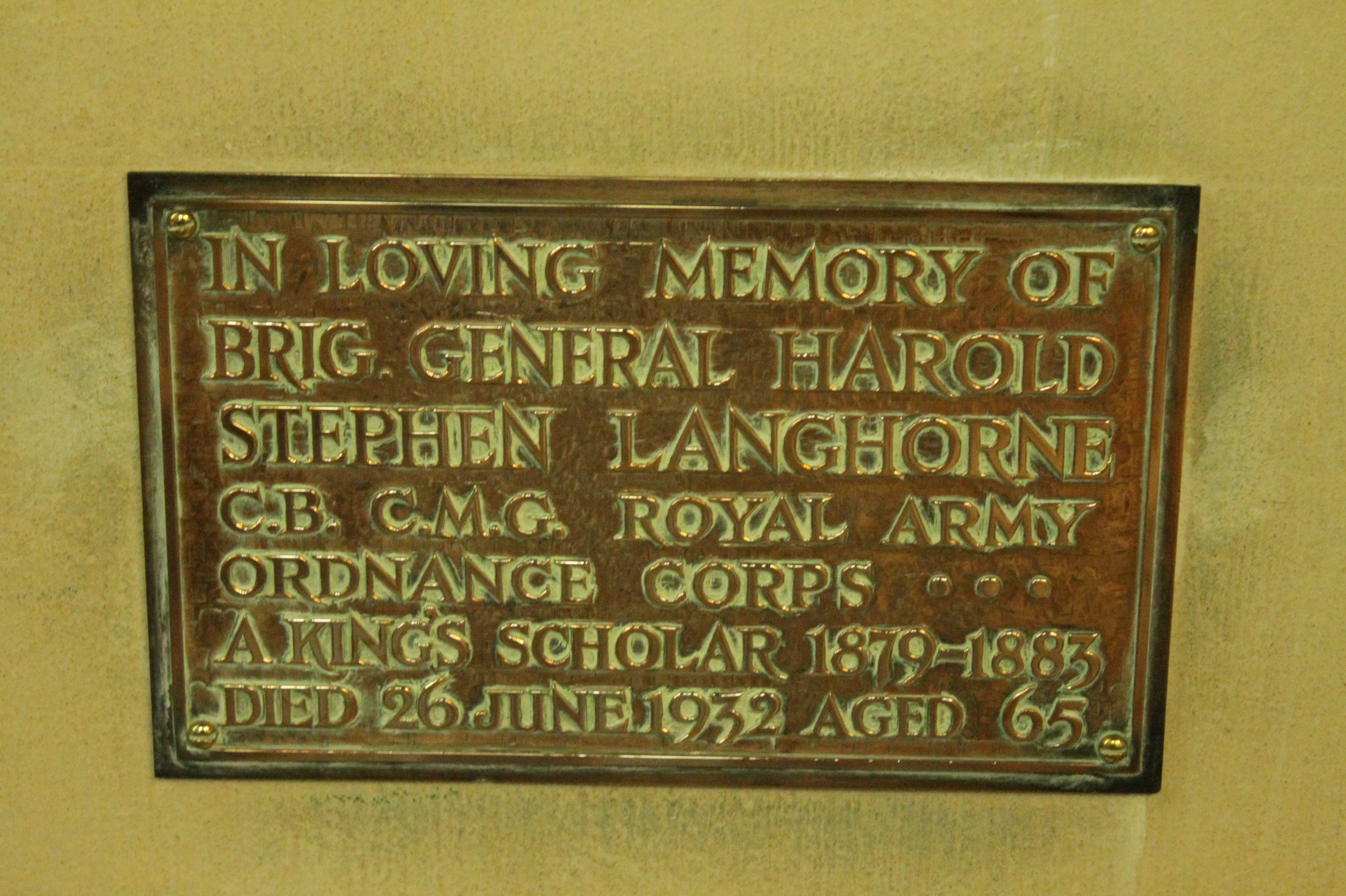
Plaque to Brigadier General Harold Stephen Langhorne, Rochester Cathedral

A brass plaque was put up in his memory at Rochester Cathedral. It reads: "In loving memory of Brig General Harold Stephen Langhorne CB CMG Royal army ordnance corps. A Kings scholar 1879-1883. Died 26 June 1932 aged 65".
