= Sawston =

Village in Cambridgeshire, England

Coordinates: 52.12471°N 0.17315°E

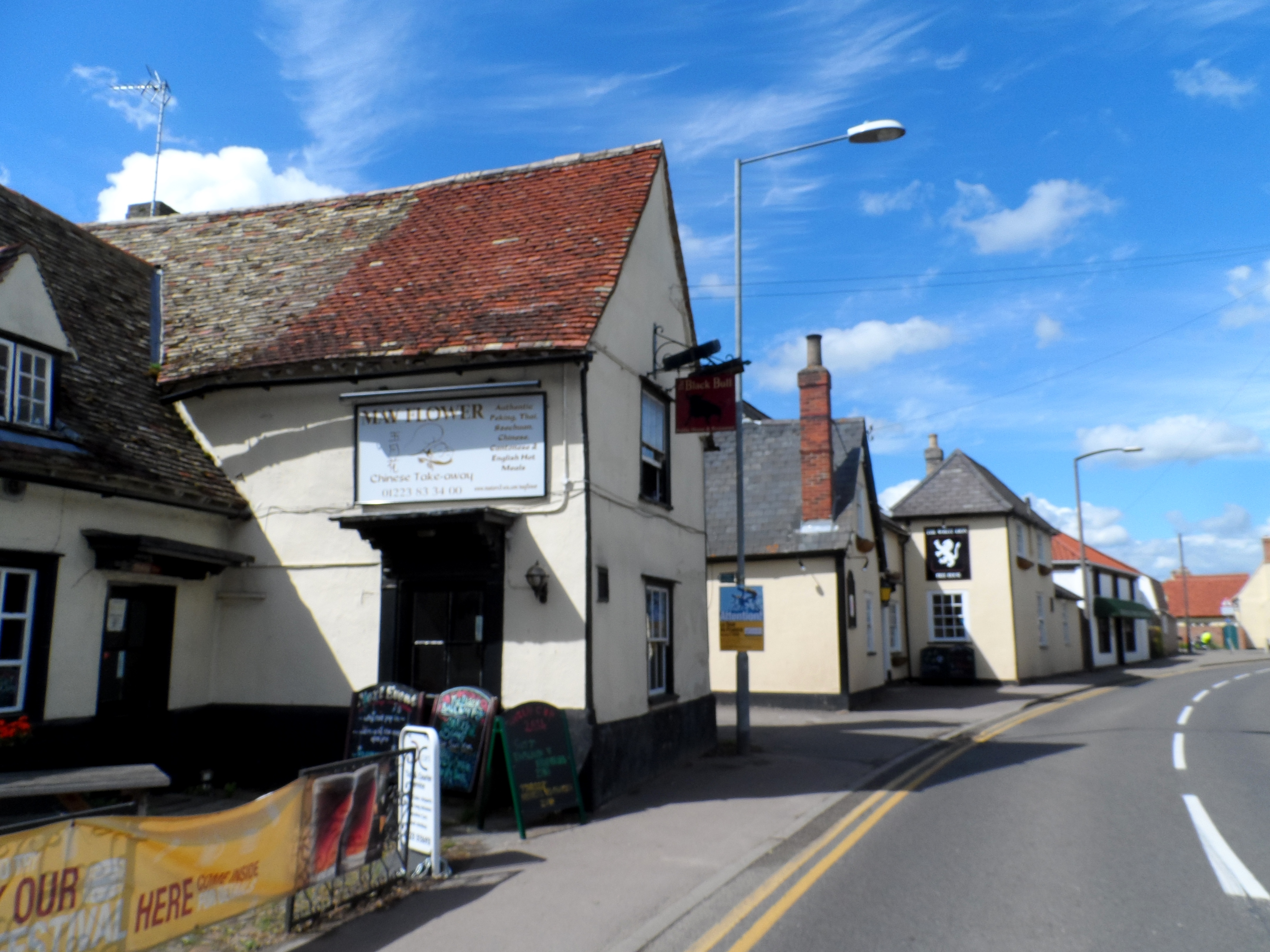
- High Street, Sawston

- Location within Cambridgeshire
- Population: 7,271
- OS grid reference: TL487496
- District: South Cambridgeshire
- Shire county: Cambridgeshire
- Region: East
- Country: England
- Sovereign state: United Kingdom
- Post town: Cambridge
- Postcode district: CB22
- Dialling code: 01223
- Police: Cambridgeshire
- Fire: Cambridgeshire
- Ambulance: East of England
- UK Parliament: South Cambridgeshire

Sawston is a large village in Cambridgeshire in England, situated on the River Cam about seven miles (11 km) south of Cambridge with a population of 7,271.

The village has historical roots dating back to medieval times and has landmarks such as Sawston Hall, a Grade I listed Tudor manor house, and St. Mary's Church, which dates back to the 13th century.

It is best known for its once notable paper and leather industry dating back to the 17th century and the opening of the first village college, Sawston Village College, in 1930.

== Toponymy ==
The historical forms of Sawston suggest a variety of spellings over time, such as Salsingetune, Salsintona, Salsiton(e), and many others. These variations reflect the evolution of the name over centuries. The suggested etymology derives "Sawston" from "Salse," potentially indicating ownership or association with a person named Salse, along with the Old English suffix "-ingatūn," meaning a settlement or farmstead. "Salse" is believed to be a shortened form of names beginning with "Sele-," and it corresponds to similar forms in Old Swedish and Old Norse . Thus, "Sawston" likely originated from a combination of these elements, ultimately meaning something like "Salse's farmstead" or "settlement of Salse's people."

== History ==
=== Prehistory ===
Although the current village of Sawston has only existed as anything more than a hamlet for 400 to 600 years, there is evidence for a settlement in the vicinity dating back to the early Bronze Age almost 5,000 years ago. The northern high-ground in Sawston would have been the only vantage point from which to view the ancient Hill figures discovered in the Wandlebury section of the Wheatsheaf Duxford.

=== Domesday Book ===
In the Domesday Book of 1086, Sawston is recorded as being in the hundred of Whittlesford and the county of Cambridgeshire. It is recorded to have 38 households, placing it in the top 20% of settlements in terms of population. Divided among three owners – Count Robert of Mortain, Geoffrey de Mandeville, and Eudo the steward – Sawston's social fabric comprised lords, villagers, smallholders, and slaves. The land was primarily used for agriculture, with ploughlands, meadows, and mills contributing to its annual valuation of £19 for all lands. Before the Norman Conquest of 1066, the previous overlords of Sawston wer notable figures in England including Earl Harold and King Edward.

=== Sawston Hall ===
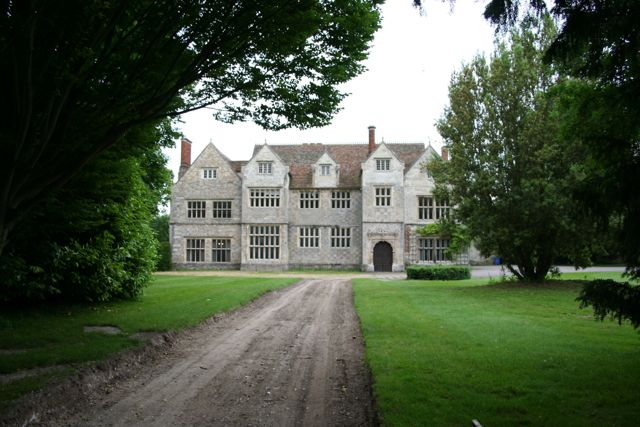
Sawston Hall

Sawston Hall is a Grade I listed Tudor manor house dating from the 16th century. It has many fine features, such as the magnificent Great Hall complete with Elizabethan panelling and a large Tudor fireplace with fireback dated 1571. The house also has its own panelled private chapel which has an 18th-century decorated plaster ceiling and wonderful stained glass windows. On the first floor there is a long gallery and a bedroom where Queen Mary I is rumoured to have slept.

The hall is surrounded by almost 60 acres (24 ha) of grounds which includes a Site of Special Scientific Interest protected by Natural England due to the presence of Cambridge Milk Parsley, a rare English native plant. The ground also include a number of naturally fed springs, woodland walks, a half moat and a number of smaller landscaped gardens.

=== Sawston Cross ===
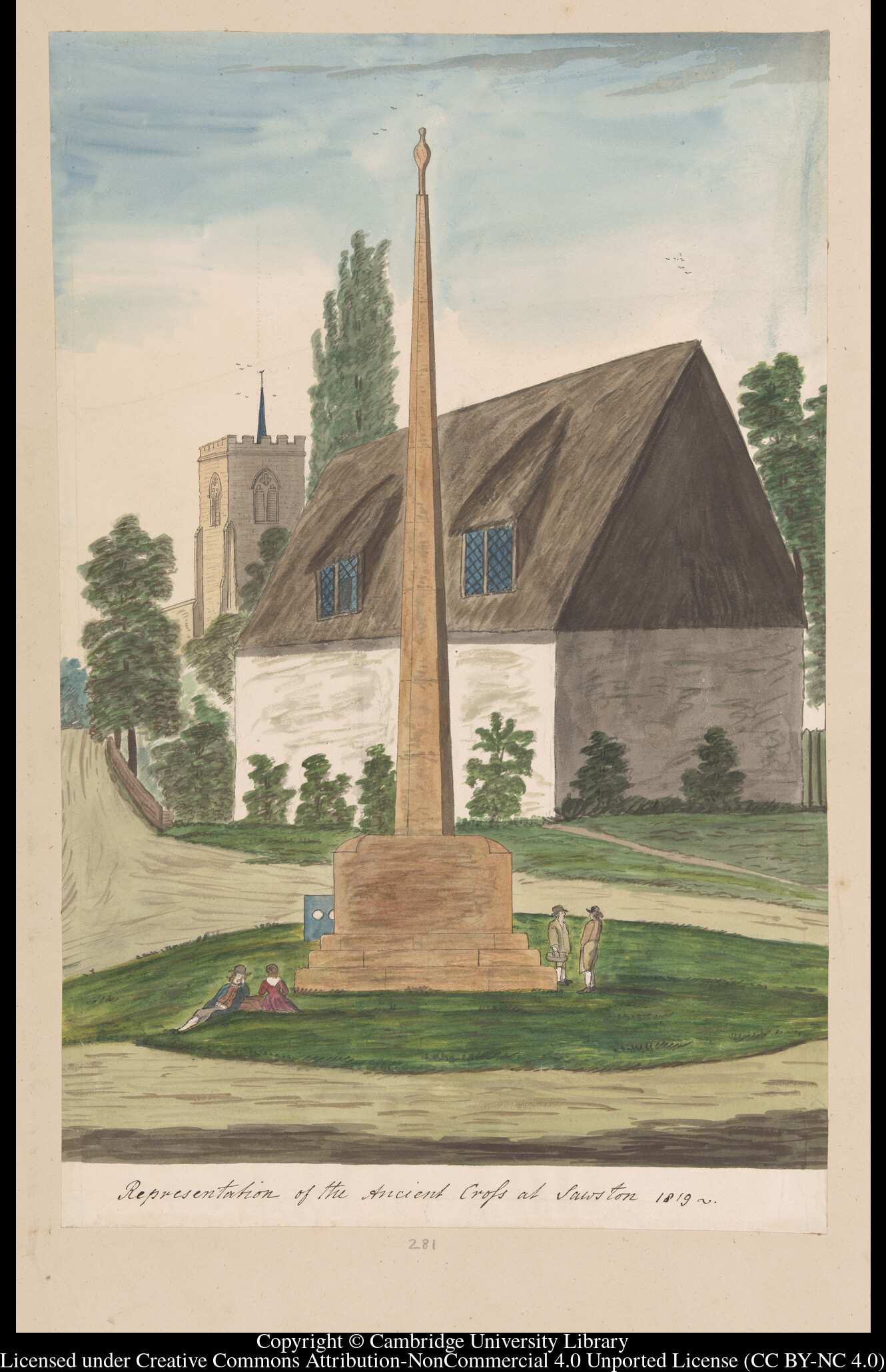
Representation of the Ancient Cross at Sawston (1819)

Until 1815 the village of Sawston had an ancient cross, possibly erected by the Knights Templar. The cross had many purposes, even as a location where public officers administered justice during the 13th century. It survived the rage of the Puritans in the civil wars, but was torn down between the summer of 1815 and autumn of 1816, along with the surrounding amphitheatre-like enclosure, the stocks and ancient sycamore tree, and sold by greedy village elders to make way for redevelopment. William Hone's Table-book includes a contributor's description when he stumbled across the villagers discussing whether or not to tear down the cross. A poem comparing Sawstonites to the Jews, which would today appear to be antisemitic, was subsequently published in the 1827 journal:

The Jews of old, as we've been told——
And Scriptures pure disclose——
With harden'd hearts drew lots for parts
Of our Salvator's clothes.

The modern Jews ——the Sawstonites——
As harden'd as the Israelites——
In ignorance still more gross——
Thinking they could no longer thrive
By Christian means, did means contrive——
Draw lots, and sold the cross!

=== Recent history ===
Sawston has seen substantial development since the end of the Second World War and, more recently, a number of large housing estates have been constructed, most notably to the north-west and south of the village. This development has led to the area of Sawston spreading into the small nearby village of Pampisford.

Sawston has been earmarked for development to meet Cambridgeshire's housing needs, including in the 2013 Local Plan from South Cambridgeshire District Council currently under review by the Planning Inspectorate. Work on a new Community Hub—a flexible meeting place and library (in temporary buildings following the 2012 fire at the Walnut Gallery, SVC)—was completed in 2022. It is located adjacent to the Marven Centre on New Road.

As well as housing developments on either side of the Babraham Road, approval has been given for the building of a 3,000 capacity football stadium to house Cambridge City F.C.

== Geology ==
The underground structure of Sawston is the same as that of the region – permeable chalk and impermeable clay. The low-lying nature of the village is indicative of a former flood plain which still tends towards the moist, although comparatively recent dredging of the local ditches and rivers has alleviated the general flooding problem. The chalky nature of the local geology provides for a clean, if hard, water supply as it is drawn from artesian wells in the area. The chalk and clay in the area contains a large quantity of flint that often finds its way into older local construction.

There is a hill, Huckeridge Hill, to the north west of the village. At 32 m it is a good viewpoint for Little Trees Hill (itself the highest point of Magog Down in the Gog Magog Hills) across the valley of the Granta.

== Industry ==
For the last couple of hundred years, the two principal industries in Sawston's environs have been Paper & Printing and Leather. The original paper mill in Sawston is on the current Spicers site, named after the family who owned the mill in the last century. This complex is located at the north-west corner of the parish. Packaging manufacturer Pulpex Ltd was established in the village in late 2020.

There are two sites in Sawston which support or have formerly supported Tanning facilities. The site south of the village centre and backing onto the grounds of the Sawston manor house – Sawston Hall – is the Hutchins and Harding site. The other site is on the southern border of the village, crossing over into neighbouring Pampisford, the Eastern Counties Leather site which has now been mostly converted into a general industrial estate. These industries were introduced into Sawston to take advantage of the clean water supply. Examination reveals that both sites are located on bore holes or streams.

A further large industrial estate exists in the north of the village adjacent to Babraham Road.

== Local government ==
Arms of Sawston Parish Council
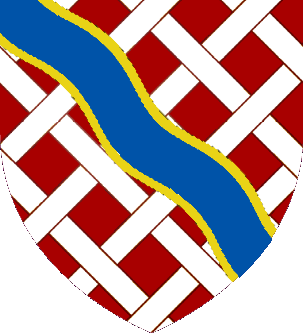
- Crest: On a Wreath of the Colours a Kingfisher wings elevated and addorsed grasping in the dexter claw a Roll of Parchment proper.
- Shield: Gules fretty Argent a Bend wavy Azure fimbriated Or.

Sawston Parish Council has a nominal 19 seats, so at the May 2016 elections 15 Councillors were elected unopposed, for a period of two years. The Council moved to a new office building on Link Road in 2011. This incorporates an office for the village History Society. Sawston Parish Council is active in many aspects of village life, including village facilities (recreation grounds, community buildings etc.) and organising events (such as annual bonfire nights).

Sawston is a two-seat Ward within the South Cambridgeshire District Council local government area. This is responsible for Planning, waste collection and the provision of local services such as street lighting. It is currently represented by Maria King and Brian Milnes, both of the Liberal Democrat Party, and both elected in the 2021 Cambridgeshire County Council election.

Sawston is a two-seat Cambridgeshire County Council District with its last elections in May 2017 (following Boundary Commission review.) It is currently represented by Brian Milnes and Maria King, both of the Liberal Democrat party.

Nationally, Sawston is in the South Cambridgeshire constituency for representation in the Westminster Parliament – a seat currently held by Pippa Heylings of the Liberal Democrats since the 2024 United Kingdom general election. It hosts hustings every election in the Free Church.

== Health ==
Sawston Medical Practice occupies a site on the London Road, which was completed in 2008. This practice merged with the Linton Practice (known collectively as the Granta Medical Practices) effective from April 2016.

== Education ==
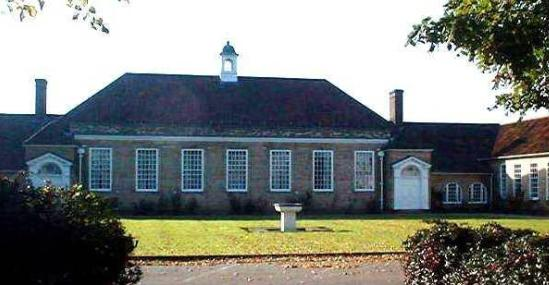
Sawston Village College

Sawston Village College was the first ever village college to be built, by Henry Morris in 1930. As of 2005 it had 1,085 pupils in 5-year groups and approximately 50 teaching staff. The Principal, as of 2024, is Jonathan Russell. Sawston Village College was named State 11–16 Secondary School of the Year in The Sunday Times Schools Guide 2025. The village also has the Bellbird Primary School (previously the John Falkner Infant and the John Paxton Junior Schools), Icknield Primary School, and a number of nursery and preschool groups.

Social events in the village take place in the village's three churches, community hall or three pubs, or on the Sawston Village College site, which incorporates a youth centre (including theatre/cinema), an Assembly Hall which is also fitted out as a show venue and a new Arts Centre. The Village College site also has a sports centre which was built in 2004 with two large halls, a swimming pool, and a gym.

== Churches ==
The village has four churches, Sawston Free Church, the parish church for the village of Sawston, Saint Mary's Church (There are some pictures and a description at the Cambridgeshire Churches website), Christ Church South Cambs also Church of England, and Our Lady of Lourdes Catholic Church, now under joint Parish leadership with Our Lady and the English Martyrs, Cambridge.

== Youth and charity ==
Due to its size the village hosts a large number of youth groups and clubs, as well as some organised by the village college. Notable organisations in the village include:

- Sawston & Babraham Cricket Club, who play at Spicers Sports Ground
- Sawston Rovers Football Club.
- Boys' Brigade Company
- Girls' Brigade Company
- Air Training Corps Squadron (2461 (Sawston) Squadron)
- Army Cadet Force
- 1st Sawston Scout Group (including Beaver, Cub and Scout divisions) of The Scout Association
- Girl Guides and Brownies
- Sawston Youth Drama
- Sawston United Youth Football Club
- Sawston Girls Football Club
- Sawston Youth Group (a large independent youth group)
- Sawston Cinema

Sawston is the base for the charity Opportunities Without Limits (OWL), which in 2010 merged with the Papworth Trust. OWL have their headquarters on the Village College site, where they maintain the school gardens and hedges. They incorporate a number of other training projects for adults with learning difficulties including a bike refurbishment and resell shop, and a café attached to Sawston Free Church in the high street.

== Culture ==
The village has a history society, a book group, and a twinning association (Sawston is twinned with Selsingen, Germany). Since 2005, the village has had an annual music festival, based around a weekend near Midsummer's Day. There are also regular musical events in St Mary's Church, often of Renaissance music sung by a consort of singers, The Company of Musicians. The community magazine Sawston Scene was started by a group of volunteers in 1970, with the first issue printed in April of that year. It has been published almost every two months ever since, missing one issue for 2020 in the midst of the COVID-19 pandemic and celebrating its fiftieth anniversary in June–July 2020. The magazine includes reports from county, district and parish councils as well as local groups and societies, a diary of local events, and a directory of local information.

== Sport ==
The village has a variety of sports clubs. Sawston Rovers Football Club, who play their home fixtures at Mill Lane, compete in Kershaw Senior B with their reserve team in Mead Plant and Grab Division 4A. Sawston United Football Club, the village's other football club, sit currently one league lower.

The 1st XI cricket team was promoted to the top tier of club cricket in 2019, The East Anglian Premier League. The 2nd XI compete in the Cambridgeshire and Huntingdonshire League, with 3rd & 4th XI in the Cambridgeshire Juniors Leagues respectively. In 2021, 2022, 2024 and 2025 the 1st XI team of Sawston and Babraham CC were league champions.

Sawston Rugby Union Football Club is based on the village college site. which currently competes in the Greene King Leagues

== Transport ==
The village is a major stop on the Citi 7 bus route operated by Stagecoach East. Northbound services, running three times per hour Monday to Saturday and once per hour on Sunday, terminate at Emmanuel Street Bus Station (Stop E1) in Cambridge City Centre. Southbound, one bus per hour terminates at London Road Turning Circle, at the junction of London Road and Brewery Road. Monday to Saturday, one service continues further to Saffron Walden, and the other to Pampisford.

Sawston has never had a railway station of its own, but Whittlesford Parkway on the West Anglia Main Line is approximately 2 miles away. A dedicated walking and cycling path connects the station to the Unity Campus business park in the southern part of the village. Sawston is also near Shelford railway station and the now-disused Pampisford station, formerly on the Stour Valley Railway.

A cycle path linking Sawston with Babraham, and Babraham with Abington was completed in October 2010, at a cost of £350,000. The route will eventually cross the A11 using the existing footbridge and join the National Cycle Network route 11.

== International links ==
The village has been twinned with the German town of Selsingen since Klaus Bruno Pape's visit to Sawston in 1984, as a result of a link being established between the two in the PhD thesis of Walther Piroth of Frankfurt University.

== See also ==
- List of places in Cambridgeshire
- Largest village in England
