= Portingbury Hills =

Hill in Hatfield Forest, Hatfield Broad Oak, Essex, United Kingdom

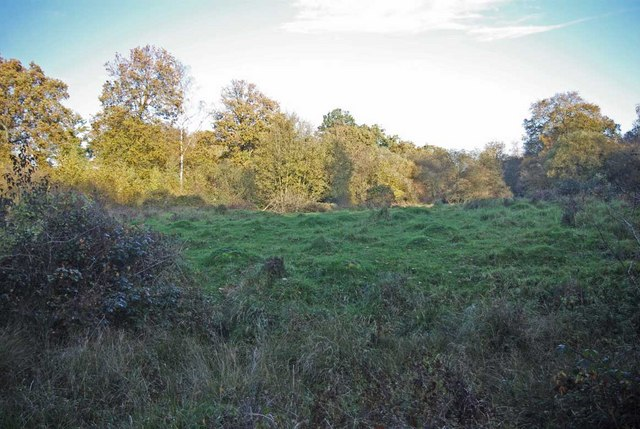
- Portingbury Hills (Photo by Glyn Baker)

Highest point
- Coordinates: 51.86136°N 0.2243°E

Geography
- Location: Hatfield Forest, Hatfield Broad Oak, England
- OS grid: TL5320
- Topo map: OS

Portingbury Hills (grid reference TL5320) or Portingbury Rings is a hill in Hatfield Forest, Hatfield Broad Oak, Essex, United Kingdom.

== Artefacts ==
Archaeological excavations were carried out in 1964–1965, with recovered evidence including a small flint blade 4 cm long, animal bones, flints, and charcoal, dated to the Iron Age.

== Environmental archaeology ==
Radiocarbon dating of organic sediments has showed that the cutting of the ditch must have occurred prior to 395 to 205 cal BC.

== Earthworks ==
The earthworks at Portingbury consist of 3 features; a hill and mound connected by a zig-zag causeway formed by 2 almost parallel ditches to another rectangular enclosure measuring 30 by 21 metres (98 ft × 69 ft) surrounded by a large ditch with a suggested bank up to 11 metres (36 feet) wide. They are located in the northwest of Hatfield Forest in Beggarshall coppice. Archaeologists suggested that the initial, V-shaped, ditch surrounding the mound would have been approximately 2 metres in depth suggesting it once had earth ramparts supported by timber. Smaller banks have been noted to cross Shermore Brook to Spittlemore coppice. However the earthworks are too small to be a hillfort and are not in a defensible position. Moreover, the ditches are of a size more commonly found in medieval moats. The current earthworks may be the result of overbuilding over time.

Traces of a larger, circular entrenchment, near Portingbury Hills, were still visible in the early 18th century.

== Archaeoastronomy theory ==
In 1975 retired geologist and researcher Christian O'Brien suggested that Portingbury Hills had a purpose in archaeoastronomy and was constructed in the Bronze Age which gave it some brief coverage in the Sunday Telegraph. O'Brien suggested that the mound was aligned astronomically with Wandlebury Hill via a series of equally spaced, hand-carved, stone monoliths forming a Loxodrome. Eleven of the original twenty-six markers are still in situ, such as the Leper Stone, with several of the other distinctive stones lying nearby. O'Brien's theory met with mixed reviews from astronomers and archaeologists. Glyn Daniel, Professor of Archaeology at Cambridge University dismissed the paper as "nonsense" and Alexander Thom could find nothing in it to revise the prevailing view of Wandlebury as an Iron Age fort. Archie Roy, Professor of Astronomy at Glasgow University commented that "in the absence of a more convincing explanation, this conclusion also has to be taken very seriously.”

== Papers ==
- O'Brien, C.A.E., 1975, The Wandlebury-Hatfield Heath Astronomical Complex, Thaxted.
