= Astronomical complex =

An astronomical complex or commemorative astronomical complex is a series of man-made structures with an astronomical purpose. It has been used when referring to a group of megalithic structures that it is claimed show high precision astronomical alignments. For the study of archaeoastronomy, such complexes of similar structures are required for adequate measurement and calculation to ensure that similar celestial sightlines were intended by the designers. These arrangements have also been known as observational, ceremonial or ritual complexes with importance for the study of prehistoric cultures.

The term has been used in the naming of various series of observatories used for observing the stars in modern times.

== Ancient astronomical complexes ==
Examples of suggested ancient astronomical complexes that may have been used as solar and lunar observatories include, in reverse-chronological order:

=== Mesoamerica ===
- The E-group ruins of a plaza with three temples and two viewing platforms at Uaxactún, near the Petén Basin, Guatemala, accredited to the Mayan civilization referred to as a Complejo Conmemorativo Astronomico.

=== Western Europe ===
- It has been suggested that the grouping of stone circles and ridge-top cairns on Bodmin Moor in Cornwall compose a ritual or astronomical complex.
- Stonehenge on Salisbury Plain in Wiltshire, United Kingdom.
- The Callanish Complex of megaliths in the Hebrides islands.
- The series of recumbent stone circles in Aberdeenshire in the North East of Scotland, including Balquhain stone circle and the cupmarked stone on its west flank.
- Wandlebury Hill, Portingbury Warren Mound in Portingbury Hills and a series of 11 marker stones including the Leper Stone in Cambridgeshire and Essex in England, also known as the Wandlebury Enigma or The Wandlebury-Hatfield Heath Astronomical Complex.

=== Central Europe ===
- Goseck circle and other Neolithic circular enclosures in Central Europe

=== Levant ===
- In 2006, then Atlit Yam was discovered in Israel in 2009, dated with certainty to at least 6300 BCE, at which point it was abandoned and submerged in the Mediterranean, but still being excavated and analyzed as of 2014. Atlit Yam has human skeletons ceremoniously buried, and is a small semi-circle of long, narrow uprighted stones etched with cup marks.
- Rogem Hiri, 40,000,000 kg of stone with a 'gate' or opening in the outer stone circle through which the sun rises on each Summer Solstice (with this 'gate' matching the Summer Solstice's sunrise even more accurately millennia ago), and a burial chamber in the center under two 5-tonne megaliths, a layer of c. 3000 BCE exposed, with a surveyed but unexcavated, c. 4000 BCE, layer beneath.
- Mnajdra and other Megalithic Temples of Malta, c. 3100 BCE and younger.

== Modern astronomical complexes ==
Examples of modern astronomical complexes of stellar observatories include:

- The Leoncito Astronomical Complex in the San Juan Province of Argentina.
- The University of Idaho Astronomical Complex in the United States.
- The research and observational centre at the Instituto de Astrofísica de Canarias (IAC) and its observatories, the Observatorio del Roque de los Muchachos, on La Palma and the Observatorio del Teide, on Tenerife.
- The observatories of the Caltech Astronomy Department, California Institute of Technology in Pasadena, California, United States of America.
