= Christian O'Brien =

British exploration geologist and author

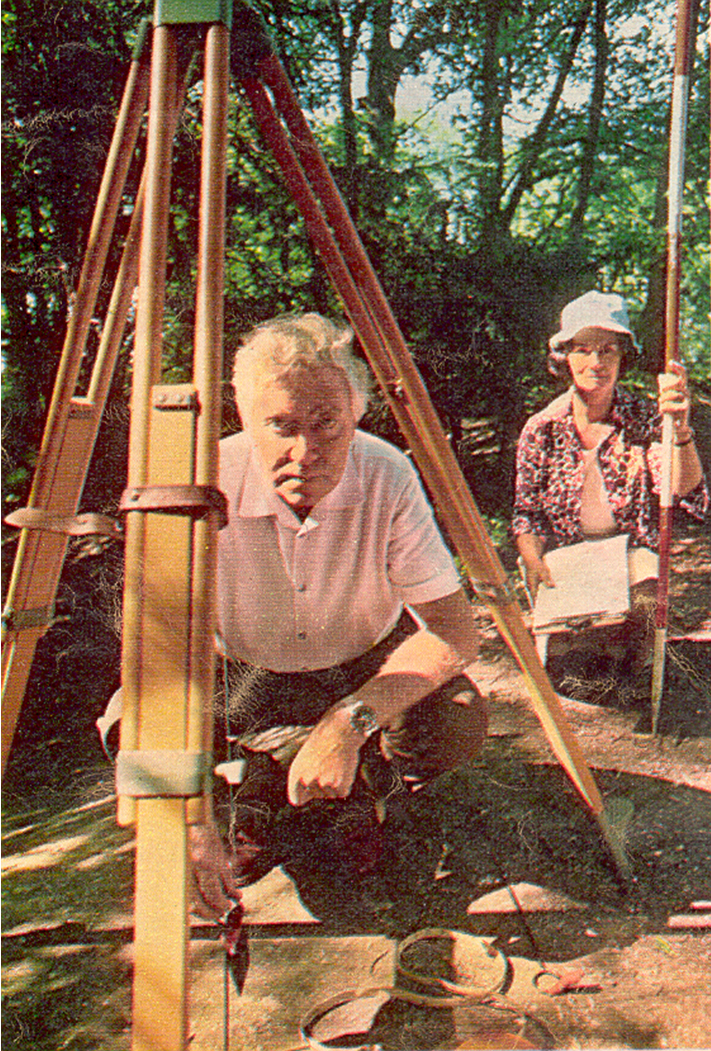
Christian O'Brien, British exploration geologist and author with his Wife Barbara Joy and a theodolite in 1976

Christian Arthur Edgar "Tim" O'Brien CBE (9 January 1914 – 17 February 2001) was a British exploration geologist and author. In 1936 he was also involved in the discovery of the Chogha Zanbil ziggurat in Southern Iran. Appointed by BP In 1967, he retired in 1971 as chairman of the boards and general managing director of the Iranian Oil Operating Companies, stationed in Tehran, and was appointed a CBE for services to the oil industry.

O'Brien devoted his retirement to researching prehistory, cuneiform, archaeology, astronomy, archaeoastronomy and the history of religion. His hypotheses have not gained acceptance by the scientific community.

== Early life, education and career ==
Born in Fulham, O'Brien was educated at Tiffin Boys School, Kingston-upon-Thames and then went to Cambridge University where he read natural sciences, graduating in 1935. In 1936, he joined the Anglo-Iranian Oil Company. His geological activities started in Southern Iran under senior geologist, Victor Boileau in the winter of 1936–37 where he assisted with Boileau's discovery of the Chogha Zanbil Ziggurat. O'Brien stayed for three years, and then was due for home leave. He happened to be in England when the Second World War started, and so joined up in the Royal Engineers, eventually becoming a major after service in Italy and Tunisia.

He returned to work in Iran after the war and was also involved in exploration geology in Canada & other countries. His later geological work included a survey of the Rocky Mountains' Boule and Bosche ranges. On 16 October 1958 he married Barbara Joy Kelly.

== Post-retirement work ==
After his retirement in 1970, O'Brien began researching and writing about ancient civilisations, taught himself how to read cuneiform, and published three books on the subject.

O'Brien published several other papers and books. "The Wandlebury-Hatfield Heath Astronomical Complex" described his surveying and discovering what he calls the Wandlebury Enigma or Line A Loxodrome, a claim which has not gained much acceptance.

"The Megalithic Odyssey" presents evidence for an astronomical complex on Bodmin Moor in Cornwall, England, dated no later than c. 2500 BC. In the book he presents his view that 13 stone circles and 86 ridge-top cairns were designed and built for complex observational astronomy by a group of itinerant sages with links to Sumer. A review in the journal Archaeostronomy describes the book as "a mishmash of erroneous statements and poorly conceived and unsubstantiated arguments." The reviewer suggests that O'Brien has misapplied statistical methods and that coupled with a dubious interpretation of the archaeology (e.g. assuming that all the cairns, all badly damaged and with only a few over two to three meters high, would have been over 10 meters high whereas similar sites have few cairns over 10 meters, with some of the 'cairns' possibly not prehistoric) "negates any value" it would have had as a claim for prehistoric archaeoastronomy. He further argues that the suggestion that the Sumerians introduced a calendar which made agriculture viable ignored the fact that agriculture had already existed in the area for over a thousand years, saying that "the book is full of statements which only confirm O'Brien's ignorance of our current knowledge of prehistory."

== Positions, awards and accolades ==
- O'Brien was appointed a CBE in 1971 for services to British interests in Iran.
- Chairman of the boards, managing director, Anglo-Iranian Oil Company, 1967–1971

== Books ==
- O'Brien, C.A.E., 1953, Salztektonik in Südpersien, Stuttgart.
- O'Brien, C.A.E., 1957, Salt Diapirism in South Persia, London and Amsterdam.
- O'Brien, C.A.E., 1960, The Structural Geology of the Boule and Bosche Ranges in the Canadian Rocky Mountains, London.
- O'Brien, C.A.E., 1975, Thaxted.
- O'Brien, C.A.E., 1983, The Megalithic Odyssey, A.C. Wellingborough. ISBN 0-85500-188-7
- O'Brien, C.A.E. & O'Brien B.J., 1985, The Genius of The Few, Wellingborough. ISBN 0-946604-17-7 (Revised edition by Dianthus Publishing 1999)
- O'Brien, C.A.E., 1985, The Path of Light, The Deram Beas, India. ISBN 0946604274 (Revised edition by Dianthus Publishing 1999)
- O'Brien, C.A.E. & O'Brien B.J., 1999, The Shining Ones, Dianthus Publishing ISBN 0-946604-20-7 (Revised edition by Dianthus Publishing, 2001)
- O'Brien, C.A.E. & O'Brien B.J., 2005, Eastern Odyssey – Experiences of a Young Geologist, E & E Plumridge, Cambridge. ISBN 0-9516563-9-2
