= Wei Wu Wei =

British writer

Terence Gray
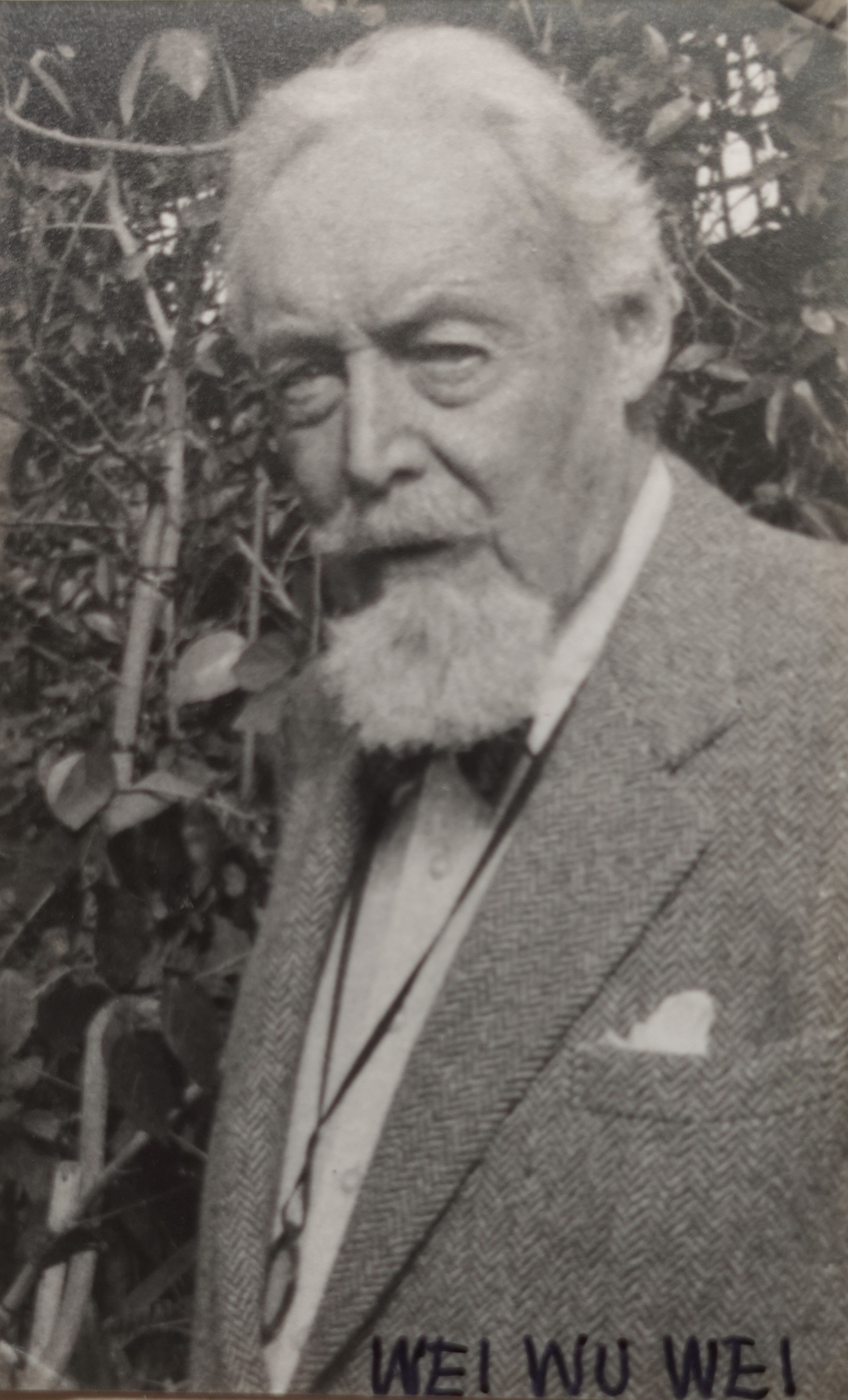
- Wei Wu Wei in his garden in Monaco in 1976
- Born: 14 September 1895; Felixstowe, Suffolk, England, UK
- Died: 5 January 1986 (aged 90); Monaco
- Occupation: Writer
- Writing career
- Pen name: Wei Wu Wei
- Genre: non-fiction
- Notable work: Open Secret

Terence James Stannus Gray (14 September 1895 – 5 January 1986) was a theatre producer who created the Cambridge Festival Theatre as an experimental theatre in Cambridge. He produced over 100 plays there between 1926 and 1933. Later in life, under the pen name Wei Wu Wei, he published several books on Taoist philosophy.

== Background ==
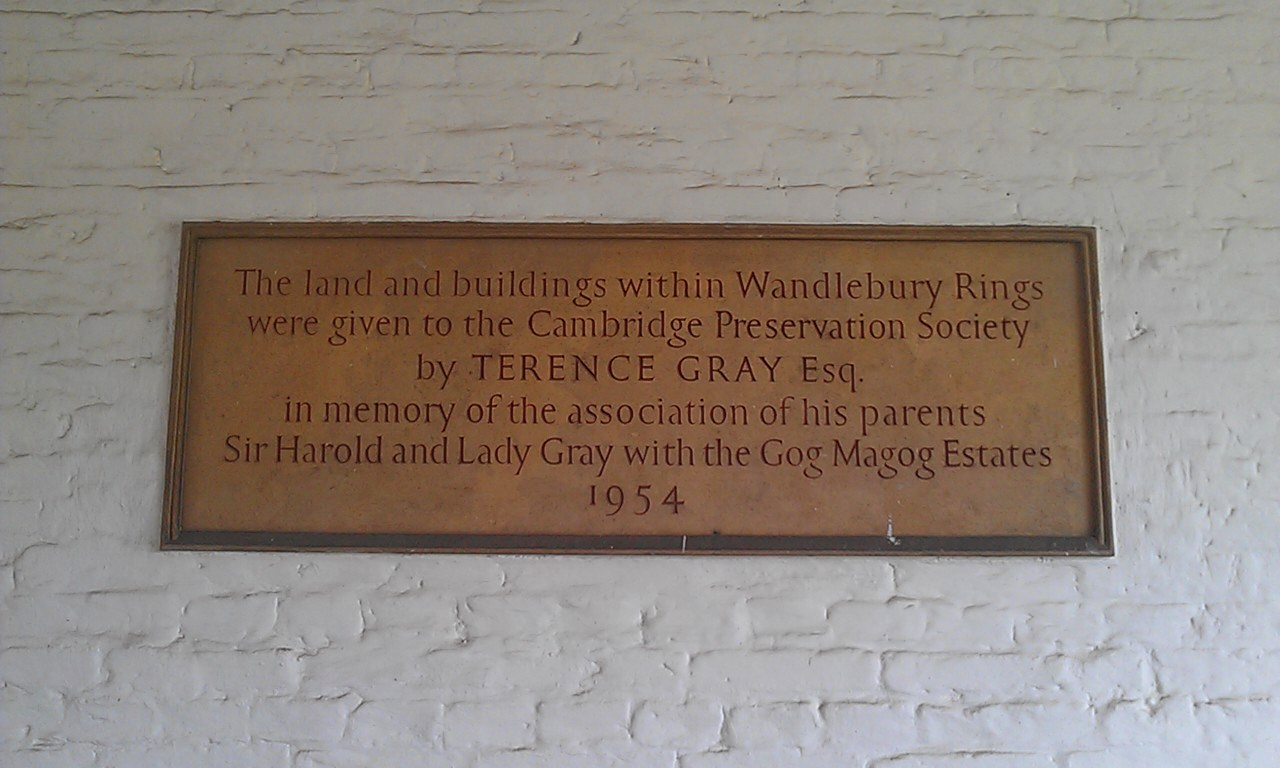
Plaque on Wandlebury stable recording his gift of land in memory of his parents, 1954

Terence James Stannus Gray was born in Felixstowe, Suffolk, England on 14 September 1895, the son of Harold Stannus Gray and a member of a well-established Anglo-Irish family. He was raised on an estate in the Gog Magog Hills outside Cambridge, England. He received an education at Ascham St Vincent's School, Eastbourne, Eton and Oxford University. Early in life he pursued an interest in Egyptology which culminated in the publication of two books on ancient Egyptian history and culture in 1923.

In the later part of his life he lived with his second wife, the Georgian princess Natalie Margaret Imeretinsky, in Monaco. He had previously been married to a Russian noblewoman, Rimsky-Korsakov.

Gray maintained his family's racehorses in England and Ireland and in 1957 his horse Zarathustra won the Ascot Gold Cup, ridden by jockey Lester Piggott in the first of his eleven wins of that race.

== Egyptology ==
Gray undertook some classes in Egyptology at University College, London in 1920-1922. He subsequently participated in four expeditions to Egypt:

1924: El Badari, Egypt under Guy Brunton of the British School of Archaeology in Egypt
1936-37: Accompanying Hans Winkler on research trips into the Western Desert to examine rock drawings and inscriptions.
Spring 1938: Expedition led by Oliver H. Myers and R. Bagnold to Gilf el Kebir and Uweinat in Western Desert.
January–February 1949: 4th Cataract expedition funded by the Archaeological and Museums Board to survey "ancient sites on the right bank of the Nile in the region of the 4th Cataract, between Karima and Abu Hamed”.

== Cambridge Festival Theatre ==
In the 1920s and 1930s, Gray worked as a theorist, theatrical producer, creator of radical "dance-dramas", publisher of several related magazines and author of two related books. His cousin was Ninette de Valois, founder of the Royal Ballet.

In 1926, Gray, with no previous practical theatrical experience, opened the Cambridge Festival Theatre as an experimental playhouse. He acquired the old Theatre Royal in the Cambridge suburb of Barnwell, and substantially rebuilt it. The opening production was Aeschylus' The Orestia, with de Valois as choreographer, and he continued to produce non-naturalistic productions, emphasising movement over speech. Doria Paston worked as an actress and set designer with Gray for seven years. Critics were divided, with some praising his achievements, and others saying he sacrificed text and acting to clever trickery. Gray delighted in upsetting audiences but, despite controversy, audiences filled the theatre.

Many of Gray's collaborators left the project over his inability to compromise. By 1933, he had abandoned theatre for good.

From an early age Gray had a serious speech impediment. According to Paul Cornwell, the stutter "...became a considerable burden to him, especially in his years at the Festival Theatre... It remained with him to varying degrees throughout his adult life, right up to the last years of his life...." The Irish writer Patrick Campbell, who was well-known for his stammer, describes how he and Gray were both invited to a lunch party. At a pause in the conversation, the two men simultaneously determined to speak, but all that came out was doubled-up strangulated noise. The other guests waited in embarrassment for what seemed to Campbell an eternity, until the hostess let out a scream, and the party chatter resumed.

== Taoism ==
After he left his theatrical career, his thoughts turned towards philosophy and metaphysics. This led to a period of travel throughout Asia, including time spent at Ramana Maharshi's ashram in Tiruvannamalai, India. Between the years 1958 and 1974, eight books and articles in various periodicals appeared under the pseudonym "Wei Wu Wei" (Wu wei, a Taoist term which translates as "action that is non-action"). His identity as the author was not revealed at the time of publication for reasons he outlined in the Preface to the first book, Fingers Pointing Towards the Moon (Routledge and Kegan Paul, 1958).

The next 16 years saw the appearance of seven subsequent books, including his final work under the further pseudonym "O.O.O." in 1974. Wei Wu Wei influenced among others, the British mathematician and author G. Spencer-Brown , Galen Sharp, and Ramesh Balsekar. Wei Wu Wei is discussed in some detail in the book Taoism for Dummies (John Wiley and Sons Canada, 2013). A biography was published in 2004.

== Works ==
- Fingers Pointing Towards The Moon; Reflections of a Pilgrim on the Way, 1958, London: Routledge and Kegan Paul (out of print); 2003, Boulder: Sentient Publications. Foreword by Ramesh Balsekar. ISBN 1-59181-010-8
- Why Lazarus Laughed; The Essential Doctrine Zen-Advaita-Tantra, 1960, London: Routledge and Kegan Paul. (out of print); 2003, Boulder: Sentient Publications. ISBN 1-59181-011-6
- Ask The Awakened; The Negative Way, 1963, London: Routledge and Kegan Paul Ltd. (2nd ed. 1974)(out of print); 1973, Boston: Little, Brown & Co. ISBN 0-316-92810-0 (out of print); 2002, Boulder: Sentient Publications. Foreword by Galen Sharp. ISBN 0-9710786-4-5
- All Else Is Bondage; Non-Volitional Living, 1964, Hong Kong University Press (reprinted 1970, 1982). ISBN 962-209-025-7 (out of print); 1999, Sunstar Publications. ISBN 1-886656-34-7 (out of print); 2004, Boulder: Sentient Publications. 1-59181-023-X
- Open Secret, 1965, Hong Kong University Press (reprinted 1970, 1982). ISBN 962-209-030-3 (out of print); 2004, Boulder: Sentient Publications. ISBN 1-59181-014-0
- The Tenth Man, 1966, Hong Kong University Press (reprinted 1967, 1971). ISBN 0-85656-013-8 (out of print); 2003, Boulder: Sentient Publications. Foreword by Dr. Gregory Tucker. ISBN 1-59181-007-8
- Posthumous Pieces, 1968, Hong Kong University Press. Foreword by Wayne Liquorman. ISBN 0-85656-027-8 (out of print); 2004, Boulder: Sentient Publications. ISBN 1-59181-015-9
- Unworldly Wise; As the Owl Remarked to the Rabbit, 1974, Hong Kong University Press. ISBN 0-85656-103-7 (out of print) (Note: this book published under the further pseudonym 'O.O.O.'); 2004, Boulder: Sentient Publications. ISBN 1-59181-019-1

== Sources ==
- Cornwell, Paul (2004) Only by Failure: The Many Faces of the Impossible Life of Terence Gray Salt Publishing, Cambridge.
