= T. C. Lethbridge =

British explorer and archaeologist

- Born: 23 March 1901; Timberscombe, Somerset
- Died: 30 September 1971 (aged 70); Exeter, Devon
- Other names: T. C. Lethbridge
- Citizenship: United Kingdom
- Education: Wellington College, Cambridge University
- Occupations: Explorer, archeologist, and parapsychologist
- Employer: University of Cambridge
- Known for: The Power of the Pendulum

Thomas Charles Lethbridge (23 March 1901 – 30 September 1971), better known as T. C. Lethbridge, was an English archaeologist, parapsychologist, and explorer. A specialist in Anglo-Saxon archaeology, he was honorary Keeper of Anglo-Saxon Antiquities at the Cambridge University Museum of Archaeology and Ethnology from 1923 to 1957, and wrote twenty-four books on various subjects, becoming known for his advocacy of dowsing.

Born in Somerset to a wealthy family, Lethbridge was educated at Trinity College, Cambridge, during the course of which he attended an expedition to Jan Mayen island, becoming part of the first group to successfully climb the Beerenberg. After a failed second expedition to the Arctic Circle, he became involved in archaeology. In his capacity as Keeper of Anglo-Saxon Antiquities at the Cambridge University Museum of Archaeology and Ethnology, Lethbridge carried out excavations at sites around Britain. His claims regarding the existence of Iron Age hill figures on Wandlebury Hill in Cambridgeshire caused controversy within the archaeological community, with most archaeologists concluding that he had misidentified a natural feature. Lethbridge's methodology and theories were widely deemed unorthodox, and in turn he became increasingly critical of the archaeological profession.

After resigning from the museum in 1957, Lethbridge devoted himself to researching paranormal phenomena, publishing a string of books on the subject for a popular rather than academic audience. Several books involved his research into the use of pendulums for dowsing, although in other publications he championed the witch-cult hypothesis of Margaret Murray, articulated the Stone Tape theory as an explanation for ghost sightings, and argued that extraterrestrial species were involved in shaping human evolution; in this he came to embrace and perpetuate the esoteric ideas of the Earth mysteries movement. Although his work in parapsychology was derided and ignored as pseudo-scientific by the academic establishment, he attracted a cult following, and his work was posthumously championed by esotericists including Colin Wilson and Julian Cope. In 2011 he was the subject of a biography by Terry Welbourn.

== Early life ==
=== Youth ===
Thomas Charles Lethbridge was born on 23 March 1901. His parents, Violet Lethbridge (née Murdoch) and her husband Ambrose Lethbridge, were wealthy and lived at Knowle House in Timberscombe, Somerset in south-west England, where they employed seven servants. The family's fortune stemmed from Ambrose's father Charles Lethbridge, who had married the wealthy coal heiress Susan Anne Yarburgh. Neither Charles nor Ambrose had to earn a living, and as gentlemen of "independent means" spent their time engaged in rural hobbies. By 1907 the Lethbridge family had moved to Lewell Lodge, Dorchester in Dorset, where Violet gave birth to daughter Jacintha in June. They then moved to a house named Trevissome in Flushing, Cornwall, where a second son, Ambrose "Bill" William Speke Lethbridge, was born. Thomas' father Ambrose contracted tuberculosis at the end of the decade, resulting in the family moving into Charles' house in Heytesbury, Wiltshire, where Ambrose died in September 1909, aged 34.

Around this time, Thomas developed an interest in archaeology, entomology, and ornithology, as well as drawing. In 1913 his family made plans for him to join the Royal Navy, although he failed the entrance exam due to alleged poor eyesight. At the outbreak of the First World War, Lethbridge was sent to Wellington College in Berkshire, while his mother and siblings moved to Buckhurst in Wokingham, Berkshire. In February 1919 Violet and her children moved to Manor House in Finchampstead, where Jacintha and Bill became seriously ill as a result of a flu pandemic; the former survived but Bill died in March.

=== University and Jan Mayen: 1921–1923 ===
In October 1921 Lethbridge enrolled at Trinity College, Cambridge, intent on studying geology and geography. Finding geology to be "crushingly dull", he rarely attended lectures and took little interest in his studies, instead spending much of his time shooting, fishing, and sailing. He graduated with a third class BA in June 1923.

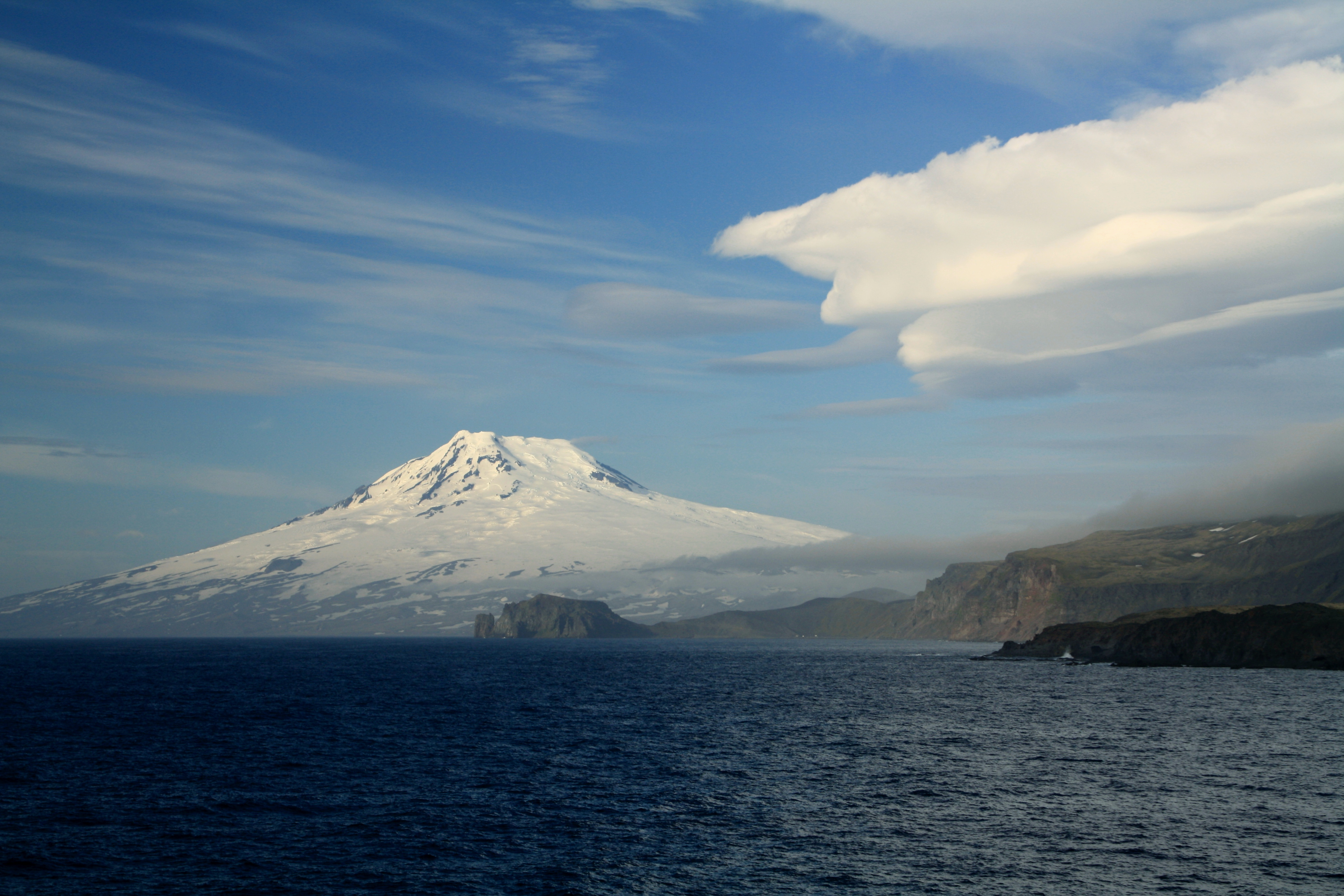
Lethbridge was part of the first expedition to climb the Beerenberg on Jan Mayen, pictured.

During his studies Lethbridge decided to join an expedition to visit Jan Mayen island in the Arctic Circle, alongside fellow Cambridge students James Chaworth-Musters and William Syer Bristowe and a don from St. John's College, Cambridge, the geologist James Wordie. Although initially planning to travel independently, they decided to join a Norwegian expedition led by Hagbord Ekerold and accompanied by Swiss mountaineer and glaciologist Paul Louis Mercanton. The expedition set sail from Bratvaag aboard two ships in August 1921, and upon arriving at Jan Mayen they became the first team to successfully climb the Beerenberg ('Bears Mountain'). During the expedition, Lethbridge was also able to explore his growing interest in archaeology by excavating at an abandoned Eskimo settlement. The Times recognised the expedition as the mountaineering event of the year.

At Cambridge, Lethbridge had entered into a romantic relationship with Sylvia Robertson, a clergyman's daughter, and they were engaged to be married in March 1922.

In mid-1922 he went on a sailing voyage around the Hebrides in Scotland with his fellow Trinity student Geoffrey Walford.

In summer 1923 Lethbridge was part of a second expedition led by Wordie, designed to explore the eastern coast of Greenland to conduct geological and archaeological investigations and repeat Edward Sabine's pendulum gravity experiments. Sailing from Newcastle, they stopped first at Bergen and then Jan Mayen before getting stuck in pack ice. With food reserves running low, the crew resorted to killing and eating grey seals and polar bears, before they eventually aborted the mission and returned home.

== Archaeological career ==
=== Keeper of Anglo-Saxon Antiquities, and marriages: 1923–1947 ===
During his student years, Lethbridge had frequented the Cambridge University Museum of Archaeology and Ethnology, where he had befriended its curator, Louis Clarke. Upon Lethbridge's graduation, Clarke offered him the honorary position of Keeper of Anglo-Saxon Antiquities at the museum. Lethbridge took up the voluntary and unpaid post, being able to subsist on his family's finances. There, Lethbridge befriended the archaeologist Cyril Fox, aiding in Fox's excavation of the Devil's Dyke in Cambridgeshire. Lethbridge's archaeological excavations were, however, deemed of poor quality by many of his peers. In turn, Lethbridge derided the archaeological establishment, being frustrated by how long it took them to accept what he deemed to be "facts", and trusting his instinct and common sense rather than the dogma of the profession. There were exceptions to his scorn; for instance, he developed a friendship with T. D. Kendrick, an Anglo-Saxon art historian who then worked as Keeper of the British Museum in London. Over the course of his career at the museum, Lethbridge produced 60 archaeological reports, written in an unusually informal manner that used humour and wit and included narrative descriptions of the excavation process.

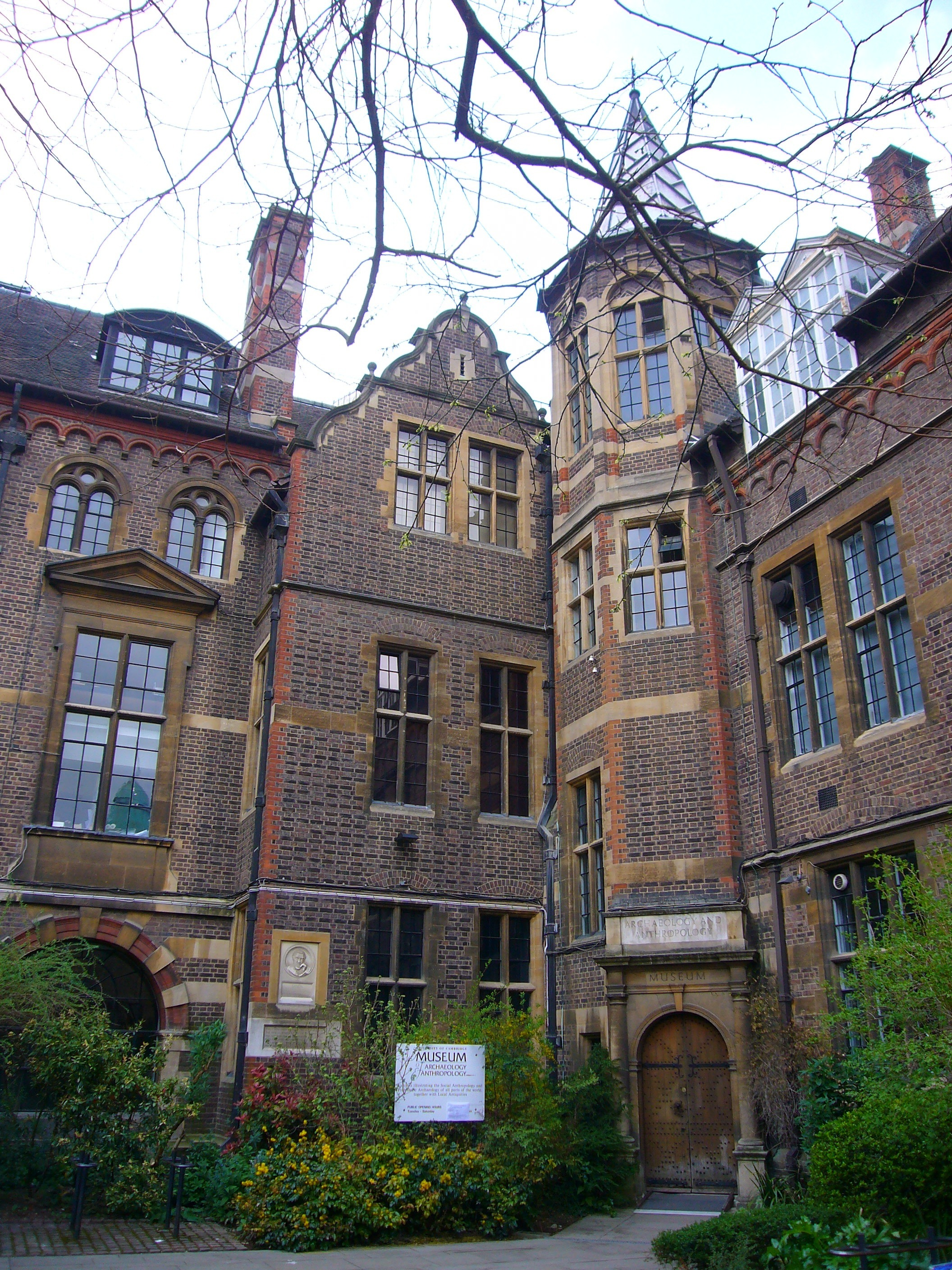
Museum of Archaeology and Ethnology, Cambridge

In February 1924, Lethbridge married Sylvia Robertson in a ceremony held at Salisbury Cathedral. Together they moved into a house known as The Lodge in Waterbeach. There, their first two sons were born: Christopher John in March 1925 and Hugh Periam in July 1926. In 1927, they moved to Mount Blow, a house in Shelford designed by architect Edwin Lutyens. It was there that Sylvia gave birth to a daughter, Belinda Mary, in April 1930. Sylvia suffered from mental illness however, resulting in repeated hospitalisation. Lethbridge meanwhile devoted much of his time to yachting around the British Isles, sometimes taking family members with him. Over the course of the 1930s he self-published a series of books featuring his own sketches and engravings of maritime scenes. He also deepened his interest in the paranormal during this period, coming to believe that an acquaintance of his was a genuine psychic and observing an unidentified flying object in Bracknell.

In 1937, Wordie organised an expedition to North West Greenland to investigate cosmic radiation at high latitudes and great altitudes. He assembled a team of ten men, nine of whom were from Cambridge University, among them Lethbridge and two other archaeologists. Setting sail in June 1937, Lethbridge undertook excavations of Eskimo sites at Rhyder Island, Cary Island, North West Island, and Isbjörn Island. On returning home in October 1937, it was decided that various geographical features encountered would be named after team members, and thus two lakes on Baffin Island were named the Lethbridge Lakes. During the trip, Lethbridge became particularly interested in the design of Eskimo boats, resulting in the self-publication of his 11-page booklet, Umiak – the European Ancestry of the 'Women's Boat', in 1937. He followed this with a second book, The Fishermen of Durness (1938), in which he argued that a study of contemporary traditional fishing communities could inform archaeologists more about ancient boat-making and fishing.

As the Second World War loomed, the British Admiralty commissioned Lethbridge to undertake a reconnaissance mission to Iceland to analyse German naval activity around the country, which he carried out in summer 1939. Lethbridge however treated the mission with contempt, spending much of the time visiting sites that interested him, such as locations mentioned in the Icelandic Sagas. Back in Britain, he self-published a short volume discussing his Icelandic journey, News from Tili. As war broke out, Lethbridge organised the transfer of much of the museum's collections to Balsham Caves for safe keeping, while also becoming a warden of the Air Raid Precautions. He also led the rescue excavation of ten prehistoric tumuli that were being destroyed to enable the construction of RAF Snailwell for the Royal Air Force.

Meanwhile, Lethbridge's wife Sylvia had been having affairs with various men, and he himself had begun an affair with Sylvia's younger cousin Mina, who was a secretary at the museum. The couple divorced in June 1943, and in November Lethbridge sold Mount Blow to pay a settlement to Sylvia. He married Mina in July 1944 at Oban, and together they moved from Cambridge to a farm on the Scottish island of Kerrera, where Lethbridge excavated some local caves. But the couple found life on Kerrera too isolated and soon returned to Cambridge, despite Lethbridge's dislike of the place and most of the university staff whom he worked alongside. He nevertheless continued his archaeological investigations, excavating an Anglo-Saxon cemetery at Lackford on Cavenham Heath, and involving himself in the investigation of the newly unearthed Mildenhall Treasure, being the individual responsible for locating its probable discovery spot. He was among the first to take an interest in the cemeteries of the Mid Anglo-Saxon period, believing that the lack of 'pagan' objects such as weapons reflected the fact that those buried in two seventh-century cemeteries were among the earliest Anglo-Saxon Christians. In January 1948, Lethbridge received word that his son Hugh had died by suicide after suffering post-traumatic stress disorder during his time in the armed forces.

=== Major publications and Gogmagog: 1948–1957 ===
1948 also saw the publication of Lethbridge's first major book, Merlin's Island: Essays on Britain in the Dark Ages, a collection of six essays on various elements of Early Medieval Britain. Representing Lethbridge's unorthodox and eclectic approach, it was aimed at a popular rather than academic audience, and although some academic reviewers were critical, it received much qualified praise. This was followed in 1950 by Herdsman and Hermits: Celtic Seafarers in the Northern Sea, in which he returned to his interest in seafaring and boats. Containing a foreword by Kendrick, it was published by Bowes and Bowes. In 1952, Lethbridge published Coast Wise Craft, which again looked at boat building but was aimed at a general rather than specialist readership. That same year, Thames and Hudson published Lethbridge's Boats and Boatmen as part of their "The Past in the Present" series edited by archaeologist Jacquetta Hawkes. In 1954, Andrew Melrose published Lethbridge's The Painted Men, a book about the Picts of Northern Britain. It was deemed to be his last conventional book within the archaeological and academic community. As part of his increasing public profile, the BBC invited him to give the third talk in their second series of Myth or Legend?, which he devoted to the question of whether Europeans had arrived in the Americas prior to Christopher Columbus; in particular he looked at the claims that St. Brendan and Thorfinn Karlsefni had made the journey across the Atlantic. Over several seasons he also carried out excavations of wheelhouses at South Uist, and on one occasion was visited at the site by Queen Elizabeth II and Prince Philip, Duke of Edinburgh.

Lethbridge's next project focused on searching for a chalk hill figure that was reported to have once existed on Wandlebury Hill in the Gog Magog Hills, Cambridgeshire. Towards the end of 1954 he began investigating the site, inserting metal rods into the ground to determine where he believed the turf had once been removed to expose the chalk below. He believed that he had revealed three large figures, a warrior, a hooded goddess, and a sun god, asserting them to be likely 3000 years old, and then began excavation to remove the turf and reveal the figures. Lethbridge sought much publicity for his discovery, reporting on it to The Times and being interviewed by the London Evening News. However, many archaeologists were sceptical of Lethbridge's methodology and the existence of the hill figures; they believed that the soft patches of chalk were the result of chalk solifluction and were only interpreted as human-made figures through Lethbridge's vivid imagination. The Council for British Archaeology brought together a committee to assess Lethbridge's findings, composed of I. W. Cornwall, W. F. Grimes, Christopher Hawkes, and Stuart Piggott. With the aid of geologist F. E. Zeuner, the committee concluded that the shapes Lethbridge had discovered were natural, having been formed during the last ice age. However, Hawkes disagreed with his colleagues, and believed that while not proven, Lethbridge's conclusions could not be disproved. Lethbridge stuck by his original ideas, and wrote a book aimed at a general audience, Gogmagog – The Buried Gods on the basis of them. It was published by Routledge and Kegan Paul in 1957, but received no supportive reviews.

In May 1957, the Egyptologist Margaret Murray involved herself in the Gogmagog debate, championing Lethbridge's ideas against the academic fraternity in a letter she sent to The Times. W. F. Grimes responded by claiming that she was out of touch with contemporary scholarship.

== Later life ==
=== Embracing parapsychology: 1957–1964 ===
"There is really only one study of man, and this should be known as Anthropology. Medical Science, History, Archaeology, Folk Lore and the rest are all branches of the one study. But this present age is one of specialization and all the branches are tending to become so elaborate and, at the same time, so constricted that we are in need of trained middle-men, who have a wide enough grasp of all of them to pull the whole thing together and present it in a readable form to those who wish to learn."

— T.C. Lethbridge, 1962.

As a result of the widespread rejection of his Gogmagog claims, Lethbridge became increasingly critical of the academic and professional archaeological community, believing that an attitude of what he called "trade unionism" had caused most archaeologists to reject independent thought. As a result, he decided to resign and move away from Cambridge in late 1957. Relocating to Branscombe in east Devon, he and Mina set up home in Hole House, a fortified building that dated to the Early Modern period, and angered some of the locals by banning fox hunters from crossing his land. Lethbridge came to believe that Hole House was haunted, describing unexplained noises and smells there; this increased his interest in the paranormal, and he decided to devote much of his time to investigating such phenomena in what he deemed to be a scientific manner. Lethbridge believed that ghosts were projections stored in rock and other material substances and which echoed particularly emotional or traumatic events that either happened in the past or will happen in the future. He focused many of his experiments on dowsing using a pendulum, coming to believe that the length of string used and the number of oscillations could be used to determine the type of object being detected.

His first book on the subject of what he often termed "the odd" was Ghost and Ghoul, published in 1961 by Routledge and Kegan Paul. In this work he argued that the mind was separate from the brain; he believed that the mind was connected to an ancestral collective mind which everyone inherited. Many of the ideas expressed in the work were akin to those of Carl Jung, Richard Semon, and Amy Warburg, although it is not clear if Lethbridge had been aware of this beforehand. An extract was subsequently published in the January 1963 edition of Fantastic Stories of Imagination. He followed this work with Witches – Investigating an Ancient Religion (1962), which articulated a form of Murray's witch-cult hypothesis but also contained many digressions and anecdotes unrelated to that topic. Returning to the themes present in Ghost and Ghoul, Lethbridge published Ghost and Divining Rod in 1963, in which he discussed his progress with his pendulum experiments. On the basis of this, the BBC filmed a short documentary titled Ghost Hunting with T.C. Lethbridge in May 1964, in which Lethbridge was filmed repeating his pendulum experiences in his garden.

=== Final years: 1965–1971 ===
Lethbridge's next book was ESP – Beyond Time and Distance, published in 1965. It dealt with the theme of extra-sensory perception and articulated Lethbridge's argument that rays of energy were transmitted from every object, and that they could be detected using pendulum dowsing. In 1966 he published A Step in the Dark, which repeated many of his theories regarding pendulum dowsing present in earlier works. Early that year, Lethbridge first began struggling against heart disease, an affliction that had resulted from his obesity. In both his books and private letters from this period he regularly ranted against modern life and society, while in other correspondences with individuals in the United States he championed the authenticity of the Kensington Runestone and Westford Knight.

In 1969, Lethbridge published The Monkey's Tail, in which he discussed Darwinian evolution. Although agreeing that the evolution of species was an objective fact, he nevertheless argued that there was a blueprint for existence and that genetic memory was a reality. In a sequel published in 1969, The Legend of the Sons of God – A Fantasy?, Lethbridge argued that extraterrestrials had been responsible for aiding Earth's evolutionary development. Echoing many of the claims made by Erich von Däniken in Chariots of the Gods (1968), Lethbridge argued that the late prehistoric stone circles of the British Isles had been beacons for extraterrestrial spacecraft. In this, his work has been cited as an anticipation of the Earth mysteries movement that expanded across Britain in the following decade.

Lethbridge's heart condition worsened, to the extent that he was unable to attend his mother's funeral in 1970. He eventually required 24-hour care, and was transferred to Nuffield Hospital in Exeter, where he died in his sleep on 30 September 1971. His body was interred at the family plot in Heytesbury, Wiltshire. As the Branscombe house was owned by the Lethbridge Family Trust, Mina was obliged to move out after her husband's death, and she sold his belongings out of financial necessity. Mina also collected together Lethbridge's unfinished book with the help of writer Colin Wilson; together they assembled it into publishable form and it was brought out by Routledge in 1976 as The Power of the Pendulum.

== Reception and legacy ==
"The death of T. C. Lethbridge in the early autumn of last year took away from us a man who had been a colourful, stimulating, provocative and often controversial figure in British archaeology; a man who could very properly be described, in Cyrus Gordon’s phrase, as one who throughout his life kept an open mind and avoided confusing majority opinion with truth."

— Glyn Daniel, 1972.

Archaeologist Niall Finneran asserted that Lethbridge had a "distinguished if fairly unspectacular reputation" within British archaeology prior to his adoption of fringe theories. Various colleagues expressed critical praise of his work in this field; for instance, Lethbridge's fellow Anglo-Saxon archaeologist Audrey Meaney noted that his "observations on features in the cemeteries he excavated around Cambridge were perspicacious but in advance of his time". Another Anglo-Saxon archaeologist, Sam Lucy, later noted that Lethbridge's observation that those buried with Anglo-Saxon material culture need not have been ethnically descended from continental migrants was – while largely ignored by his contemporaries – widely accepted in scholarship by the end of the 20th century. However, his embrace of unorthodox and pseudo-scientific views later led to professional archaeologists becoming increasingly critical of his work; as his biographer Terry Welbourn noted, Lethbridge's peers came to view him as being "too radical ... a loose cannon and maverick".

On his death, Glyn Daniel described Lethbridge as "a colourful, stimulating, provocative and often controversial figure in British archaeology", who represented "one of the last of that invaluable band of dilettante scholars and devoted amateurs of whom we have had so many in Britain". Although stating that Lethbridge only emerged as a "semi-professional" for a "short time", he praised much of Lethbridge's writing for its "freshness and an eager restless sense of enquiry". An anonymously authored obituary in The Antiquaries Journal referred to "the strength and honesty of Lethbridge's character as a man, and the singleness of purpose that united all his work, as experimental testing of what he found by observation", seeing these as the unifying characteristics behind his divergent research interests. According to the historian Ronald Hutton, as a result of both his unorthodox ideas and his "contempt for professionalism in all fields", Lethbridge's "status as a scholar never really rose above that of an unusually lively local antiquary". His books continue to be largely ignored by academics into the 21st century.

Describing Lethbridge as "one of the most compelling" figures in 20th-century British archaeology, Finneran believed that at the start of the 21st century, Lethbridge was best known for his advocacy of dowsing. As such, Finneran asserted that Lethbridge's "true legacy" lay outside of "conventional archaeology", and could instead be located within the Earth mysteries movement. Lethbridge's work continued to attract interest from parapsychologists after his death. The author M.B. Devot drew heavily on Ghost and Ghoul in his Spirits of Field and Hearth. In 1978, the author Colin Wilson devoted part one of his book Mysteries to a discussion of Lethbridge's ideas. In 2003, a group of admirers of his work calling themselves "The Sons of T.C. Lethbridge" (Doggen Foster, Kevlar Bales and Welbourn Tekh), with the aid of Wilson and Julian Cope, released A Giant: The Definitive T.C. Lethbridge, a set comprising a booklet and two CDs containing music accompanying discussions of Lethbridge's work. Welbourn subsequently published a biography of Lethbridge in 2011, titled T.C. Lethbridge: The Man who Saw the Future; in it, he expressed his view that the archaeologist was "one of the most remarkable, yet overlooked men of the twentieth century".

== Bibliography ==
A full bibliography of Lethbridge's published books and academic papers is provided in Welbourn's biography.

Year of publication	Title	Publisher
1931	Recent Excavations in Anglo-Saxon Cemeteries in Cambridgeshire and Suffolk: A Report	Cambridge Archaeological Society (Cambridge)
1933	Shanty	Self-published
1933	Some West Country Coasters	Self-published
1934	From Dublin to Elsinore in a Sailing Ship	Self-published
1935	North About: Notes on a Passage from the Clyde to the Åland Islands	Self-published
1936	Short Splices – Some Notes on Ships and Boats	Self-published
1937	Umiak: The European Ancestry of the 'Women's Boat'	Self-published
1938	Fishermen of Durness	Self-published
1939	Notes from Tili	Self-published
1948	Merlin's Island: Essays on Britain in the Dark Ages	Methuen & Co. (London)
1950	Herdsmen and Hermits: Celtic Seafarers in the Northern Sea	Bowes and Bowes (Cambridge)
1952	Coastwise Craft	Methuen & Co (London)
1952	Boats and Boatmen	Thames and Hudson (London)
1954	The Painted Men: A History of the Picts	Andrew Melrose (London)
1957	Gogmagog: The Buried Gods	Routledge and Kegan Paul (London)
1961	Ghost and Ghoul	Routledge and Kegan Paul (London)
1962	Witches: Investigating an Ancient Religion	Routledge and Kegan Paul (London)
1963	Ghost and Divining Rod	Routledge and Kegan Paul (London)
1965	ESP: Beyond Time and Distance	Routledge and Kegan Paul (London)
1967	A Step in the Dark	Routledge and Kegan Paul (London)
1969	The Monkey's Tail: A Study in Evolution and Parapsychology	Routledge and Kegan Paul (London)
1972	The Legend of the Sons of God: A Fantasy?	Routledge and Kegan Paul (London)
1976	The Power of the Pendulum	Routledge and Kegan Paul (London)
1980	The Essential T.C. Lethbridge	Routledge and Kegan Paul (London)

== Notes and references ==
=== References ===
- Anonymous (1972). "Obituary of T.C. Lethbridge". The Antiquaries Journal. 52. Society of Antiquaries of London: 448–449. doi:10.1017/S000358150002148X.
- Daniel, Glyn (1972). "Editorial". Antiquity. 46 (181). The Antiquity Trust: 1–7. doi:10.1017/s0003598x00053060.
- Geake, Helen (1992). "Burial Practice in Seventh- and Eighth-Century England". In Martin Carver (ed.). The Age of Sutton Hoo: The Seventh Century in North-Western Europe. Woodbridge: Boydell Press. pp. 83–94. ISBN 978-0851153308.
- Gibson, Marion (2013). Imagining the Pagan Past: Gods and Goddesses in Literature and History Since the Dark Ages. London and New York: Routledge. ISBN 978-0-415-67419-5.
- Finneran, Niall (2003). "The Legacy of T.C. Lethbridge". Folklore. 114 (1). The Folklore Society: 107–114. doi:10.1080/0015587032000059915. JSTOR 30035070. S2CID 216644161.
- Hutton, Ronald (1999). The Triumph of the Moon: A History of Modern Pagan Witchcraft. New York: Oxford University Press. ISBN 978-0-19-820744-3.
- Lethbridge, T.C. (1962). Witches: Investigating an Ancient Religion. London: Routledge and Kegan Paul.
- Lucy, Sam (2000). The Anglo-Saxon Way of Death: Burial Rites in Early England. Stroud: Sutton Publishing. ISBN 978-0750921039.
- Meaney, Audrey (1981). Anglo-Saxon Amulets and Curing Stones. Oxford: British Archaeological Reports. ISBN 978-0-86054-148-6.
- Welbourn, Terry (2010). "The Buried Gods of Gogmagog". British Archaeology. No. 112. York: Council for British Archaeology. pp. 38–41. ISSN 1357-4442.
- Welbourn, Terry (2011). T.C. Lethbridge: The Man Who Saw the Future. Winchester and Washington: O-Books. ISBN 978-1-84694-500-7.
