= Stone Tape theory =

Theory about ghosts

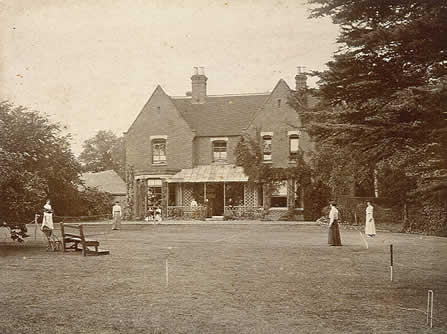
Borley Rectory in 1892, the "most haunted house in England"

The Stone Tape theory is a pseudoscientific claim that ghosts and hauntings occur when traumatic events are imprinted on certain stones or other materials and are subsequently replayed, similar to a magnetic tape recording. The idea of materials holding information from emotional events aligns with views of 19th-century intellectuals and psychic researchers, such as Charles Babbage, Eleanor Sidgwick and Edmund Gurney.

Contemporarily, the concept was popularised by Nigel Kneale's 1972 horror-drama television play The Stone Tape.

== History ==
The idea that environmental elements are capable of storing traces of human thoughts or emotions was introduced by multiple 19th-century scholars and philosophers as an attempt to provide natural explanations for supernatural phenomena. In 1837, the polymath Charles Babbage published a work on natural theology called the Ninth Bridgewater Treatise. Babbage speculated that spoken words leave permanent impressions in the air, even though they become inaudible after a time. He suggested that it is possible due to transfer of motion between particles.

The "Stone Tape theory" could also be derived from the concept of "place memory." In the early days of the Society for Psychical Research (SPR), place memory was considered an explanation for ghostly apparitions - seemingly connected with certain places. In the late 19th century, two SPR-involved investigators, Edmund Gurney and Eleanor Sidgwick, opined that certain buildings or materials were capable of storing records of past events, which could be played back later by gifted individuals.

Another 19th-century idea associated with the "Stone Tape theory" is psychometry: the belief that one can obtain knowledge of an object's history through mere physical contact with it.

Circa 1940, the idea that objects were able to store and "play back" past events was re-introduced by SPR president H. H. Price. Price postulated a sort of "psychic ether" as an intermediate medium between spiritual and physical reality, enabling objects to carry memory traces of emotions or experiences from the past. Price added that "it ought to be possible to verify [these traces'] existence by the ordinary methods of physical Science [...] But so far as we know, this cannot be done."

Following Price's ideas, an archaeologist turned paranormal researcher, T. C. Lethbridge, claimed that past events can be stored in objects thanks to fields of energy, which he believed to surround streams, forests or mountains. His 1961 book Ghost and Ghoul popularised these ideas, although Lethbridge never used the exact term "stone tape" in this book or any other.

== Reception ==
In their book How to Think About Weird Things: Critical Thinking for a New Age (2013), authors Theodore Schick and Lewis Vaughn dismissed the idea as an irrational claim, stating, "The problem is that we know of no mechanism that could record such information in a stone or play it back. Chunks of stone just do not have the same properties as reels of tape." Sharon Hill, science educator and geologist, claims that "stone tape theory" is a misleading term, as it suggests to encompass structure, credibility and explanatory power or scientific theory, while in reality it is speculation that lacks physical basis. According to her, it is an attempt to present a pseudoscientific claim in a seemingly scientific style. Hill also suspects that the "kernel of the idea of stone tape" is psychometry, which is criticised for being a form of cold reading rather than an unexplained supernatural phenomenon.
