= Wandlebury Hill Fort =

Iron Age hill fort in Cambridgeshire

Coordinates: 52°09′29″N 0°11′5″E

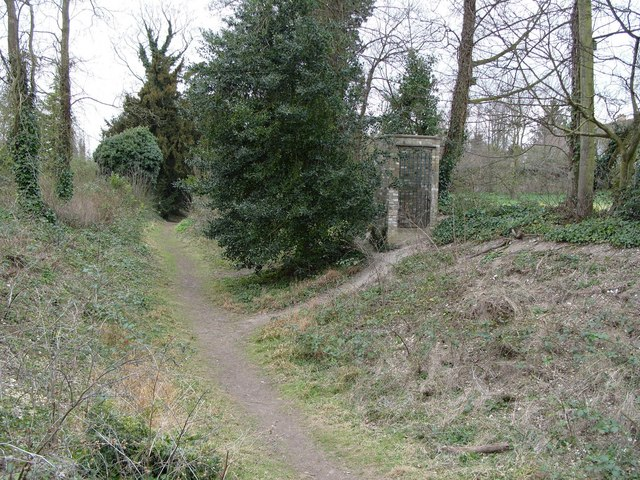
Footpath in the ditch of Wandlebury Ring

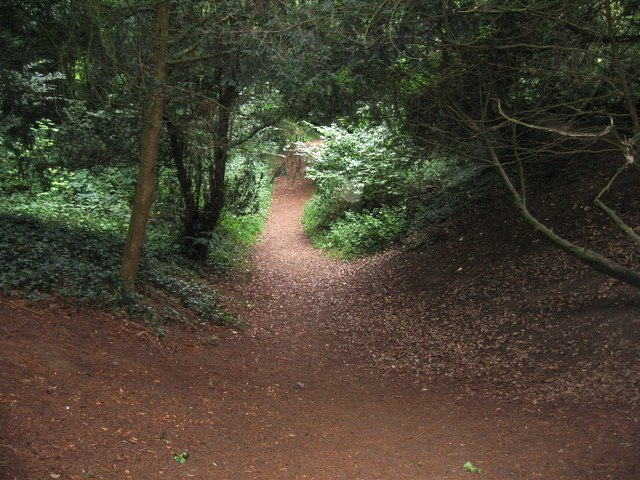
Hill fort ditch

Wandlebury Hill Fort, also known as the Wandlebury Ring, is an Iron Age hillfort located on Wandlebury Hill in the Gog Magog Hills, Cambridgeshire, England, to the southeast of Cambridge. Now a country park, it was the most important of three hillforts in the downs.

== Geography ==
Of the three hillforts, Cherry Hinton being one of them, Wandlebury was the most important. The site altitude is 62 metres (203 ft) above sea level. There are at least two theories regarding why the Wandlebury Hill Fort was built on this site: it may have been chosen because of its tactical grounds, or because it would be the last fortress in a line which controlled the Thames-Stort-Cam Valley route. Wandlebury overlooked the ancient Icknield Way. The meeting point of the hundreds of Thriplow, Chilford, and Flendish is adjacent to Wandlebury.

== History ==
The first hillfort was constructed in about 400 BC, consisting of "a substantial outer ditch and an inner rampart bank of chalk rubble and soil, enclosing a circular area of about 6 ha." A second ditch and bank circuit was added on the inner side of the first rampart in the 1st century BC, and a low counterscarp bank added around the perimeter. The inner ring had a wooden palisading to deter invaders.

Wandlebury was a border settlement. There is evidence that it was occupied by the Romans. The Romans built a road from Worts Causeway to Wandlebury. Two pottery sequences have been found establishing two separate construction phases. It may have been inhabited into the 1st century AD. It was later named Wendlesbiri (meaning, "Waendal's fort") by the Anglo Saxons and used as a Hundred council rendezvous point. Sir Thomas Malory mentions a Wandesborow Castle in Le Morte d'Arthur (1470), possibly referring to the Wandlebury Ring. The site has undergone considerable change since the 17th century. When a house, garden and racing stable was built for King James II within the boundaries of the old fort in 1685, the inner rampart and ditch were levelled. The mansion was later owned by Lord Godolphin and demolished in 1956, but the stable remains. The site is now a country park.

In 1976, a study called "An Integrated Astronomical Complex of Earthworks at Wandlebury and Hatfield Forest from the Third Millenium B.C." was published. The study by C. A. E. O'Brien was an attempt to prove that Wandlebury Ring was far older than previously thought and that the hill fort was built on an existing structure. O'Brien provided evidence that Wandlebury Ring was an astronomical structure (perhaps a huge calendar) similar to Stonehenge and Avebury stone circle, and was possibly engineered by the same team of mathematicians/astronomers. O'Brien also reported evidence of a loxodrome (a line following the angle of the Earth), marked with monoliths, running from Wandlebury Ring to the earthworks at Hatfield Forest. Aspects of O'Brien's study were challenged in an article in the Journal of Geomancy.

== Legend and literature ==
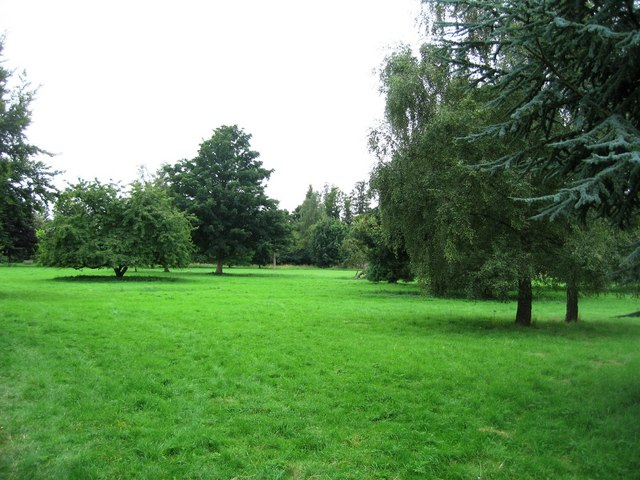
Wandlebury Ring garden

The fort and surrounding hills are shrouded in legends. Gervase of Tilbury said in his Otia Imperialia of 1214:

In England, on the borders of the diocese of Ely, there is a town called Cantabrica, just outside of which is a place known as Wandlebria, from the fact that the Wandeli, when ravaging Britain and savagely putting to death the Christians, placed their camp there, Now, on the hill-top where they pitched their tents, is a level space ringed by entrenchments with a single point of entry, like a gate. A very ancient legend exists, preserved in popular tradition, that if a warrior enters this level space at dead of night by moonlight and calls out 'Knight to knight, come forth', he will at once be faced by a warrior armed for fight, who charging horse against horse, will either dismount his adversary or himself be dismounted.

A knight named Osbert once tested the story and legend has it that he appeared in full armour and defeated the knight who appeared to him but was wounded in the thigh by his opponent's javelin on departing. This is mentioned in Sir Walter Scott's 1808 poem Marmion featuring King Alexander III jousting with a goblin knight.

== Gallery ==
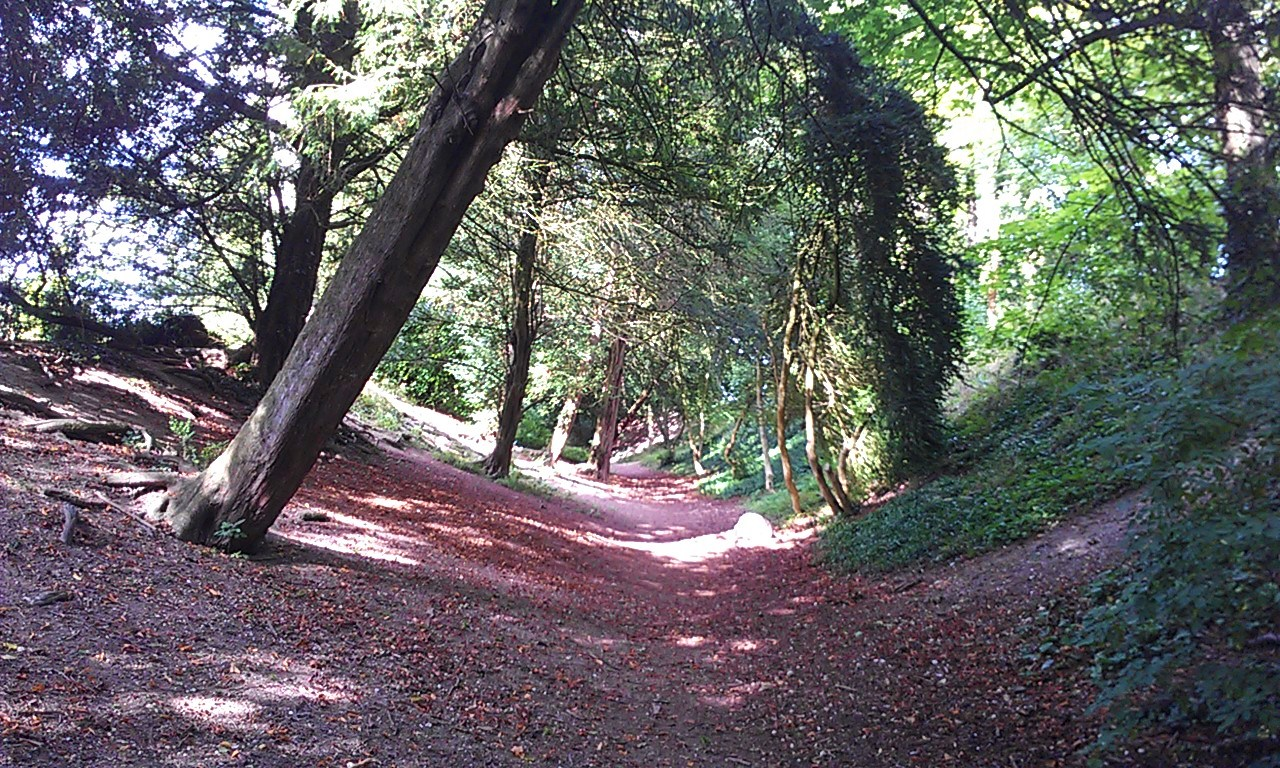
Fortification

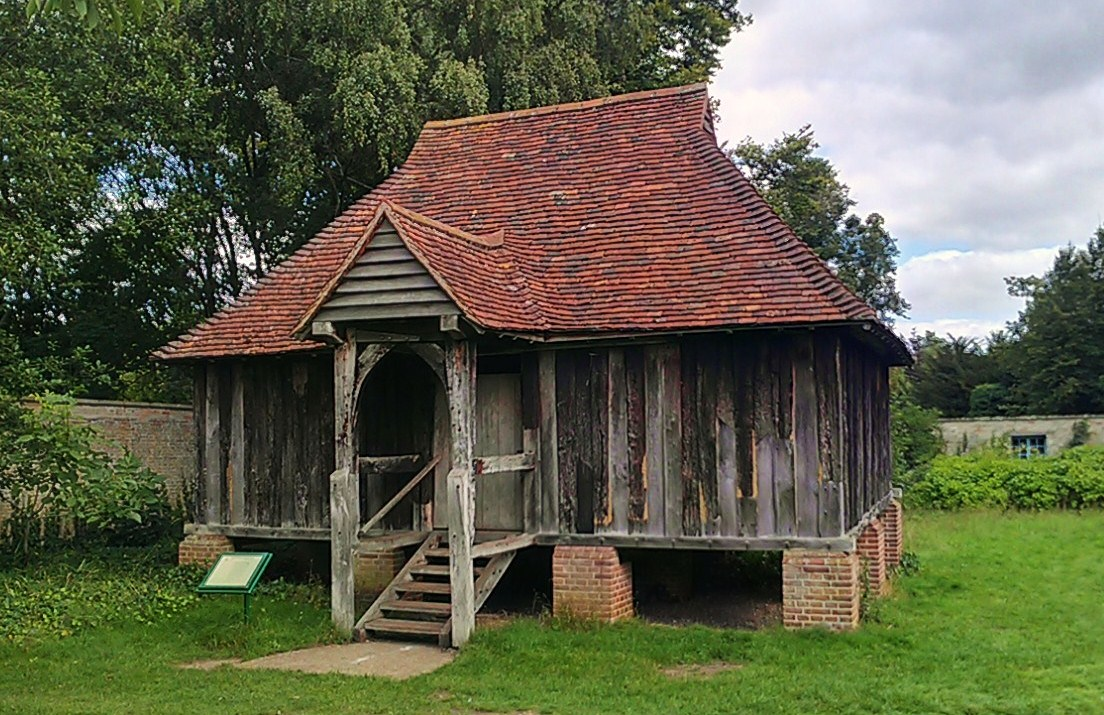
15th-century Tadlow Granary now housed in the hill fort

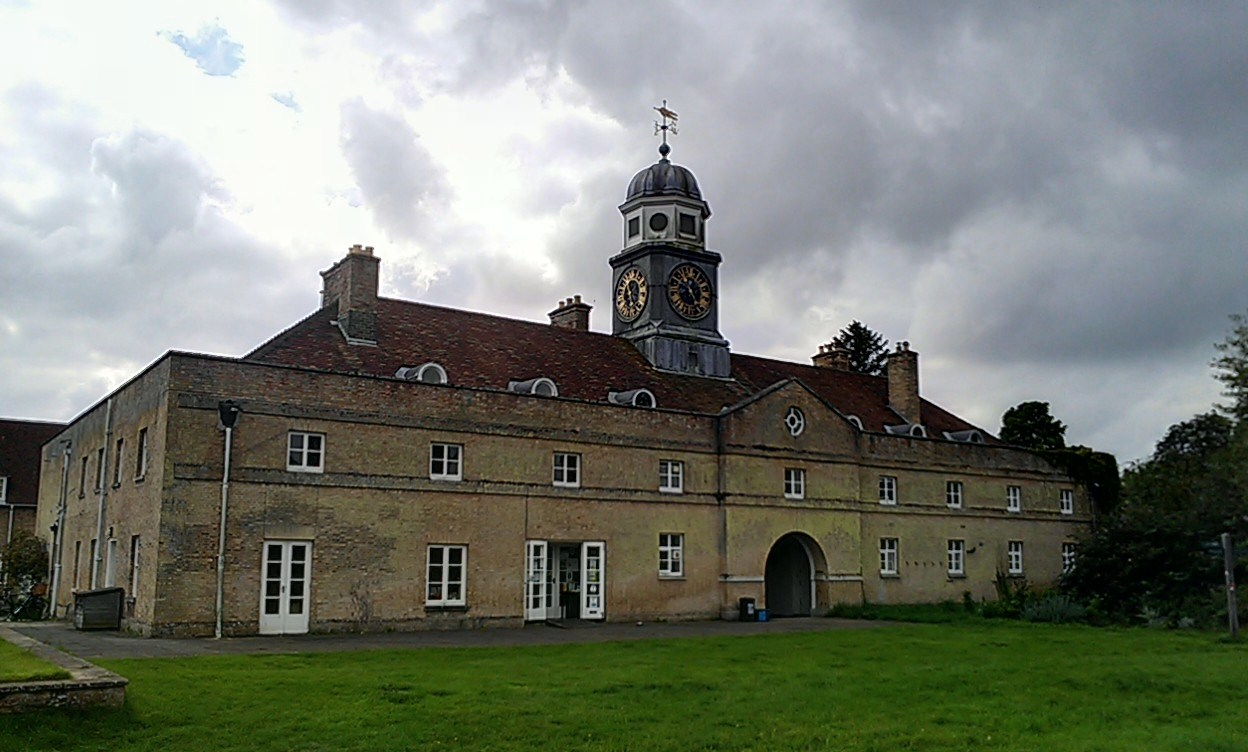
The stable

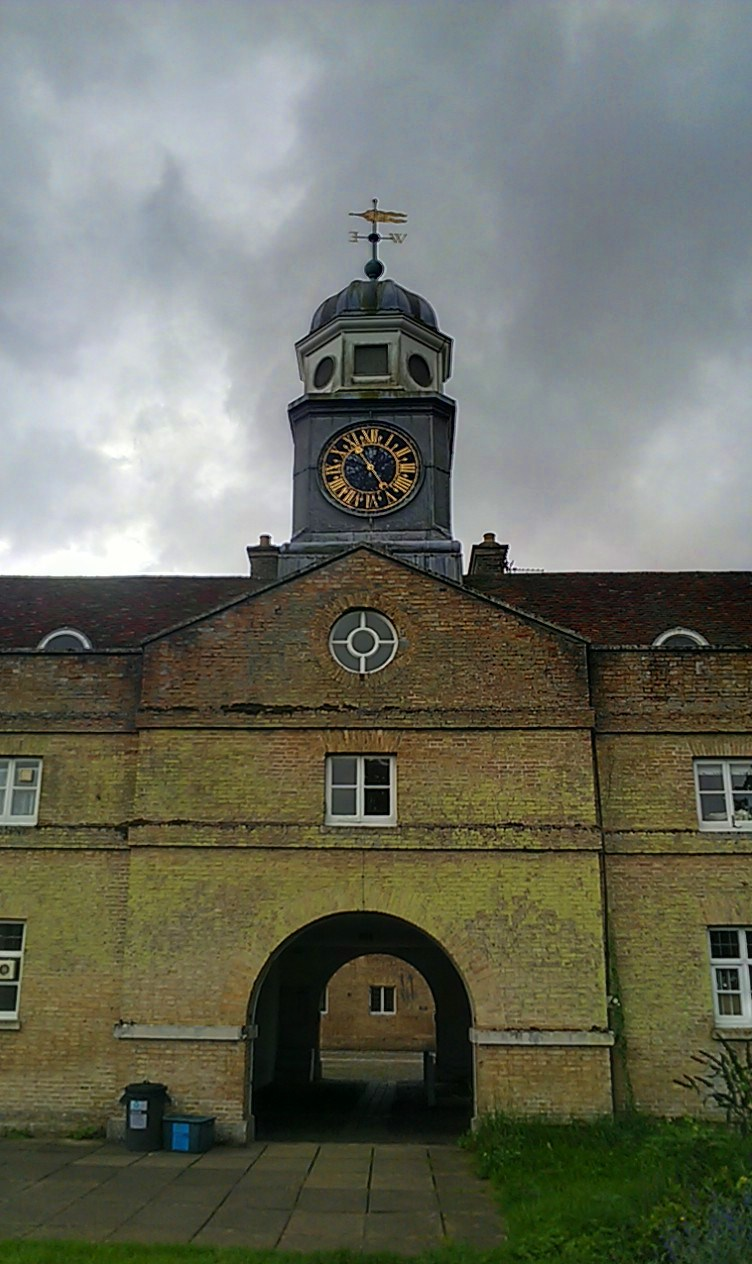
Entrance to the stable

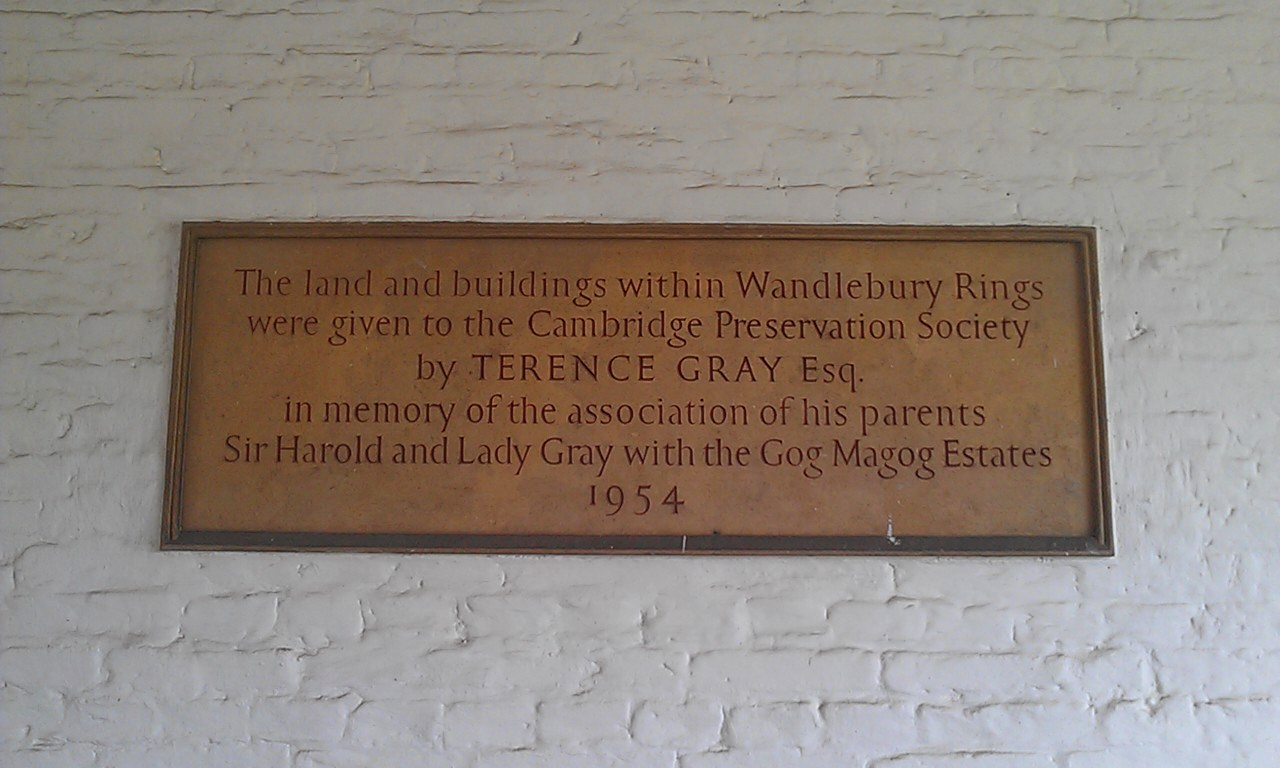
Plaque on Wandlebury Stable

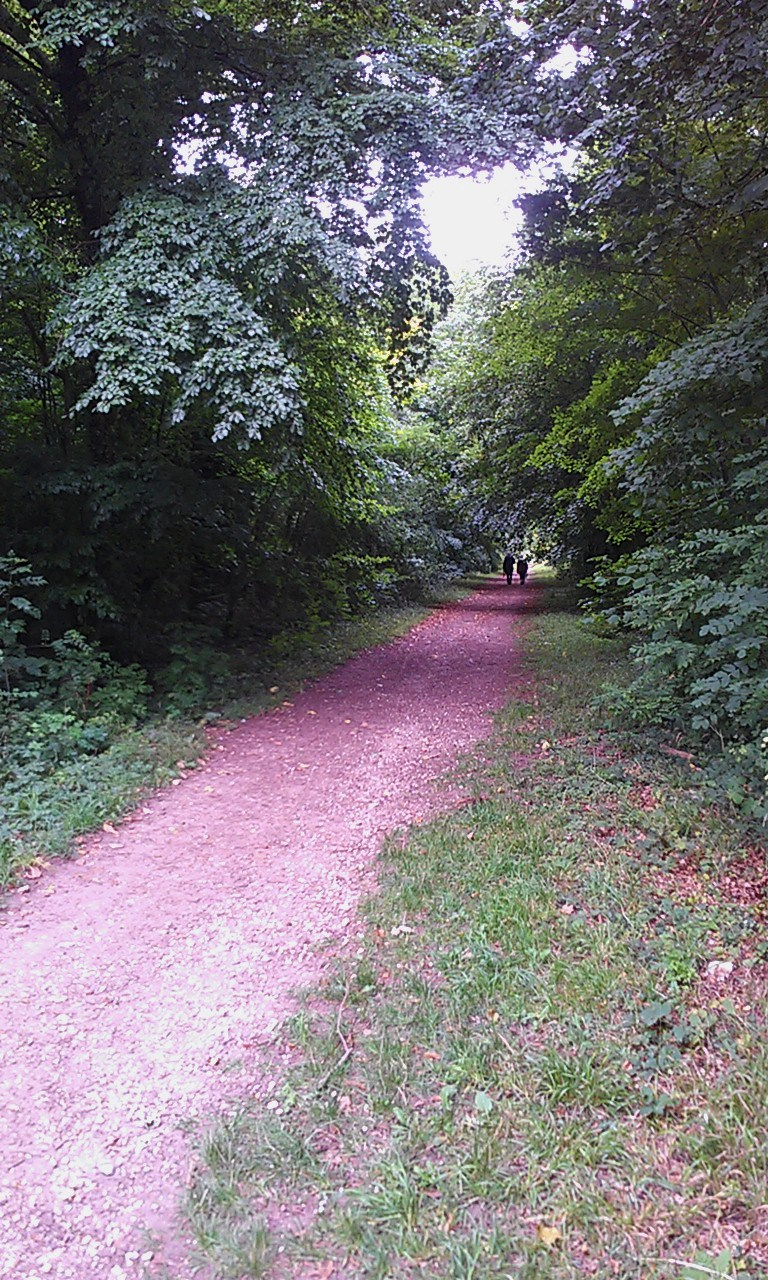
Roman road passing near to the hillfort
