= Westford Knight =

Pattern on a rock in the United States

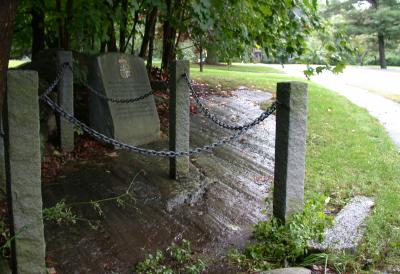
The Westford Knight, shown along Depot Street in Westford, Massachusetts

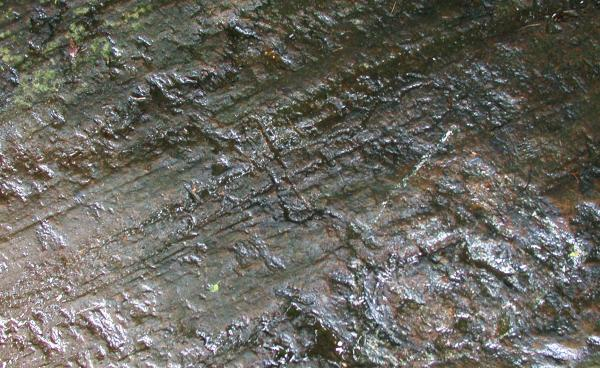
A detail of the rock, showing the "sword". The "shield" has been painted on, supposedly to indicate an underlying carving

"Westford Knight" is the name given to a pattern, variously interpreted as a carving, a natural feature, or a combination of both, located on a glacial boulder (also known as the Sinclair Rock) in Westford, Massachusetts in the United States.

It is the subject of popular or pseudohistorical speculation on Pre-Columbian trans-oceanic contact. The pattern was first described as a possible Native American carving in 1873. The identification as a "medieval knight" dates to 1954.

== Early references ==
The rock and carving are first mentioned in print in Elias Nason's 1874 Gazetteer of Massachusetts: "a rude figure, supposed to have been cut by some Indian artist." In an 1883 town history, the carving is described: "A broad ledge which crops out near the house of William Kitteredge has upon its surface grooves made by glaciers. Rude outlines of the human face have been traced upon it, and the figure is said to be the work of Indians."

The carving was subsequently interpreted not as a human figure but as a broken Viking sword by William Goodwin, owner of the nearby Mystery Hill attraction, in his 1946 book The Ruins of Great Ireland in New England. Frank Glynn, president of the Archaeological Society of Connecticut, located the carving and, following discussions with T. C. Lethbridge about Goodwin's theory, in 1954 chalked in a full figure resembling a medieval knight with sword and shield. Glynn is usually said to be the "discoverer of the Westford Knight." It was Lethbridge who suggested to Glynn that the sword was not of Viking origin, but was "a hand-and-a-half wheel pommel sword" of the type common in 14th-century North Britain.

== Modern interpretations ==
Archaeologist Kenneth Feder in 2019 compared weathering on the stone with weathering on New England gravestones whose inscriptions had become indecipherable since the year 2000, while "the Westford petroglyph, rather miraculously, appears to have improved through time, getting fresher every year with new elements appearing that previously had gone unnoticed. In truth, this simply isn’t possible. The new imagery on the Westford Knight stone either has been recently added or is entirely imaginary, and probably a bit of both." Feder argues that the Indian petroglyph described in the 19th century probably existed, as did the parallel glacial striations, and that later a metal rod or awl was used to punch the partial shape of a sword into the rock, but that "the knight in all his regalia resides only in the imagination of Frank Glynn. Other images—for example, a boat, which I could not discern on my visits—may have been added later." The site is also mentioned in Feder's Encyclopedia of Dubious Archaeology (2010).

One current interpretation by those who advocate that the feature on the rock is a human figure is that it commemorates a fallen member of the party of Henry I Sinclair, Earl of Orkney, who some believe made a voyage to the New World in 1398, traveling to Nova Scotia and New England. According to Raymond Ramsey in 1972, the shield carried by the knight in Glynn's image was found to support this belief, when "English heraldic experts consulted by Lethbridge definitely identified arms on the shield as belonging to the Sinclairs of Scotland." It has been suggested that the knight is Sir James Gunn, a member of Clan Gunn and a Knight Templar who reportedly traveled with Sinclair. As of 2025, a stone monument next to the "knight" commemorates this interpretation, stating as fact that Sinclair and his party traveled to present-day Massachusetts. There is no evidence for this claim.

== See also ==
- Kensington Runestone
- Priory of Sion
- The Skeleton in Armor
- Zeno map

== Books ==
- Frederick J. Pohl, Prince Henry Sinclair: His Expedition to the New World in 1398, 1974, Clarkson N. Potter, New York: ISBN 1-55109-122-4
- Robert Ellis Cahill, New England's Ancient Mysteries, 1993, Old Saltbox, Danvers, Mass: ISBN 0-9626162-4-9
- David Goudsward, Ancient Stone Sites of New England, 2006, McFarland Publishing: ISBN 0-7864-2462-1
- David Goudsward, Westford Knight and Henry Sinclair, 2010, McFarland Publishing: ISBN 0-7864-4649-8
- David S. Brody, Cabal of the Westford Knight : Templars at the Newport Tower : a novel, 2009, Martin and Lawrence Press, Groton, Mass: ISBN 0-9773898-7-1
- "Was Columbus the true discoverer of America?". The world's strangest mysteries. New York: Gallery Books. 1987. p. 120. ISBN 0-8317-9678-2.
- R. Celeste Ray (Editor) Transatlantic Scots, University of Alabama Press, 2005. ISBN 978-0-8173-1473-6
