= Gog Magog Hills =

Range of hills in the United Kingdom

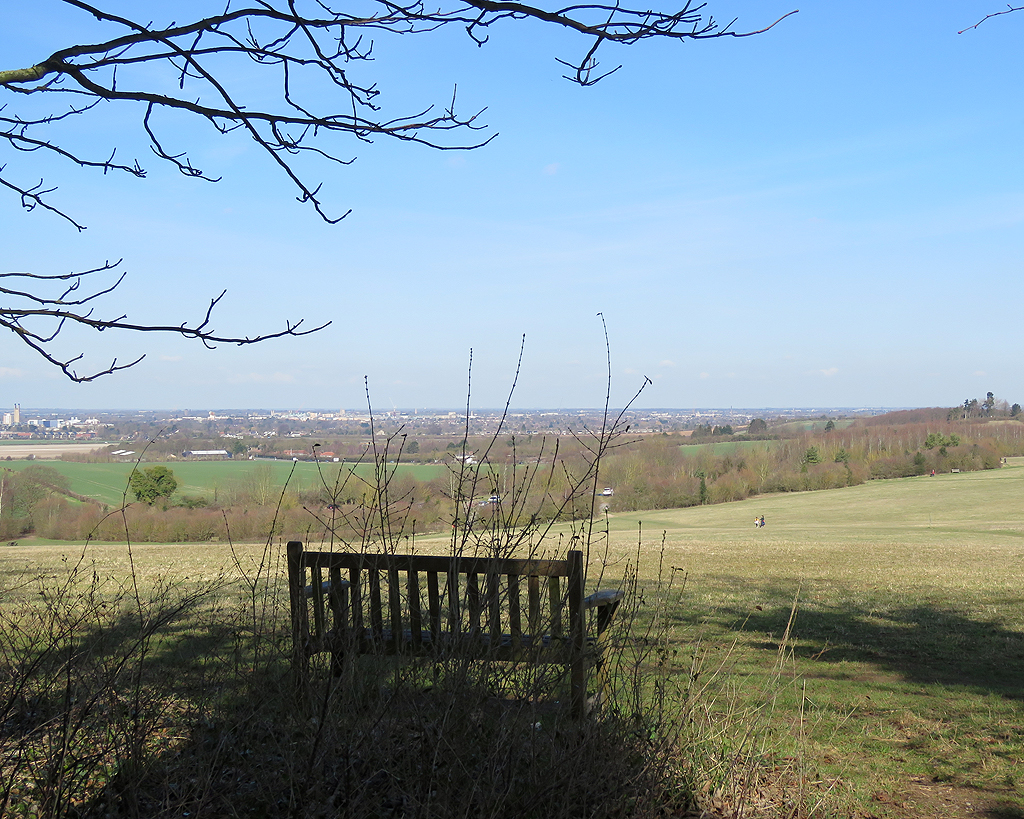
View of Cambridge from the hills

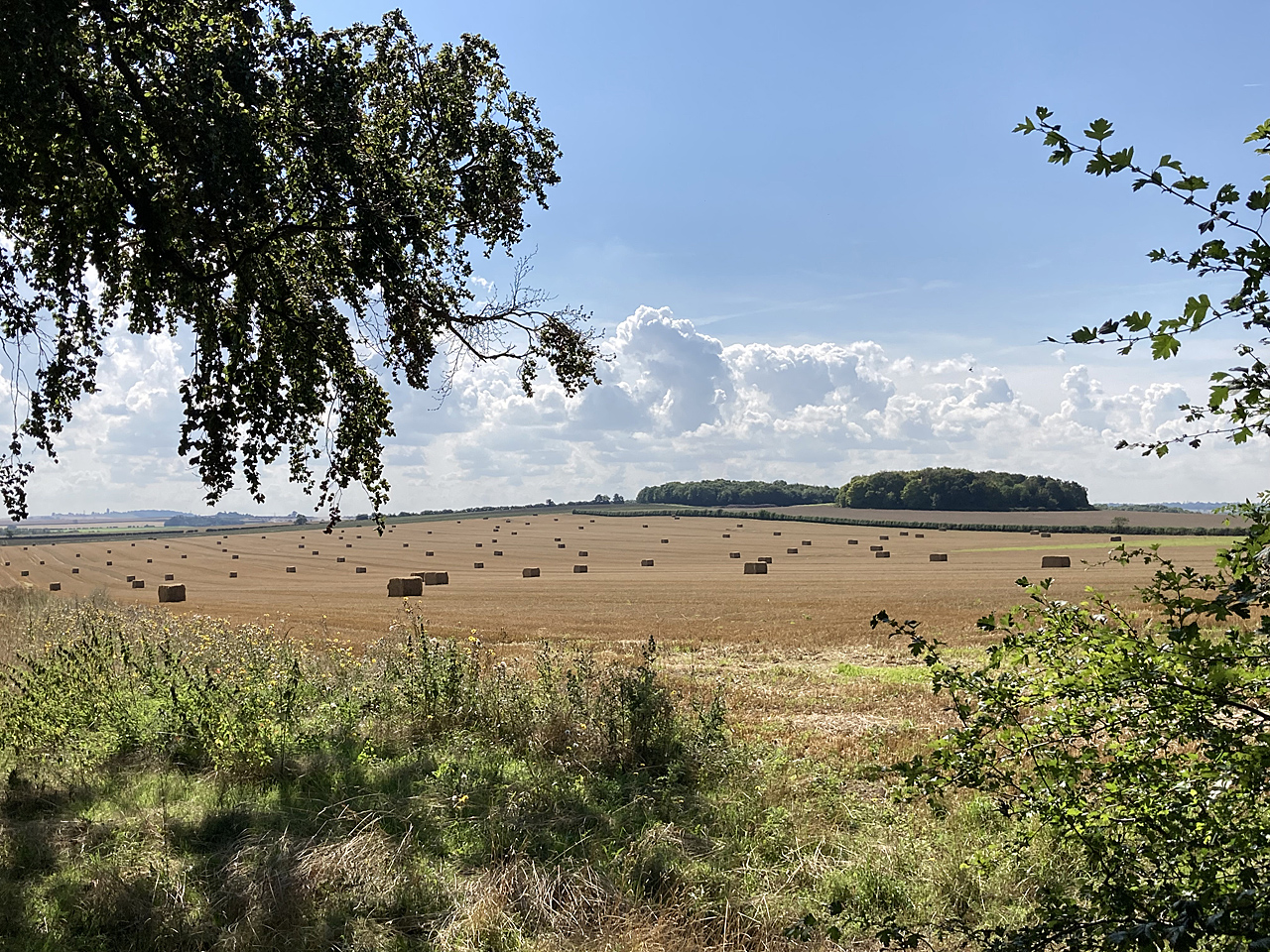
Meggs Hill

The Gog Magog Hills (known locally as the Gogs) are a range of low chalk hills extending for several miles to the southeast of Cambridge in England. The highest points are either side of the A1307 Babraham Road, and are marked on the Ordnance Survey map as Little Trees Hill (Note: Little Trees Hill, 52°09′15.59″N 000°10′25.07″E) and Wandlebury Hill, (Note: Wandlebury Hill, 52°09′28.04″N 000°11′00.72″E) at 74 m (243 ft), and Telegraph Clump, (Note: Telegraph Clump, 52°09′44.02″N 000°11′12.04″E) at 75 m (246 ft). The area as a whole is undefined, but is roughly the elevated area lying northwest of the 41 m (135 ft) col at Worsted Lodge. (Note: Worsted Lodge, 52°08′39.31″N 000°14′02.52″E)

Unlike the nearby hills of the Newmarket Ridge, which have steep sides but flat tops, these hills have large drops between summits and as such have quite a distinctive appearance; Little Trees Hill looks particularly good from Huckeridge Hill near Sawston, and White Hill dominates the view from the National Cycle Route 11 section towards Great Shelford. The hills therefore have relatively high topographic prominence.

== History ==
Gog, of the land of Magog, is mentioned in the Old Testament as an adversary of Israel. In British folklore, "Gogmagog" was reimagined as a savage giant who inhabited Britain at the time of Brutus's arrival. There was a hill figure of Gogmagog, of unknown date, at Wandlebury Ring, and it is this that gave their hills their name. Mention was made of it in the 17th and 18th centuries, but all trace of it was lost thereafter. The earliest mention of the name "Gog Magog" in connection with the hills occurs in a decree of 1574, forbidding Cambridge students from visiting the hills on pain of a fine.

The 1990 book Where Troy Once Stood argued that the ancient city of Troy was in fact located in the Gog Magog Downs; however, this is not taken seriously by scholars.

Random excavations around the hills revealed the remains of defences at Copley Hill and Cherry Hinton, not older than the Iron Age, but the sites themselves are now known already to have been occupied in the Bronze Age. The better-preserved hill fort known as the Wandlebury Ring, which is now situated in a public park, had several concentric ditches and earthen walls, which were kept in place by wooden palisades. It was already inhabited in the Bronze Age. Archaeological finds include bronze and iron objects and pottery, including "Knobbed Ware", dating from the Bronze Age.

Telegraph Clump functioned as one of the locations for the semaphore line, an optical telegraph system, between London and Great Yarmouth from around the 1820s to around 1850.

The dowser and archaeologist T. C. Lethbridge claimed to have identified some ancient hill figures buried in the chalk under the surface of the hills. These were purported to represent a sun-god, a moon-goddess and a warrior-god. Lethbridge's claims, however, were controversial and are not widely accepted.

Gog Magog Golf Club has used part of the chalk downs as a golf course since 1901. Much of the area is designated as a Site of Special Scientific Interest.

== Magog Down ==
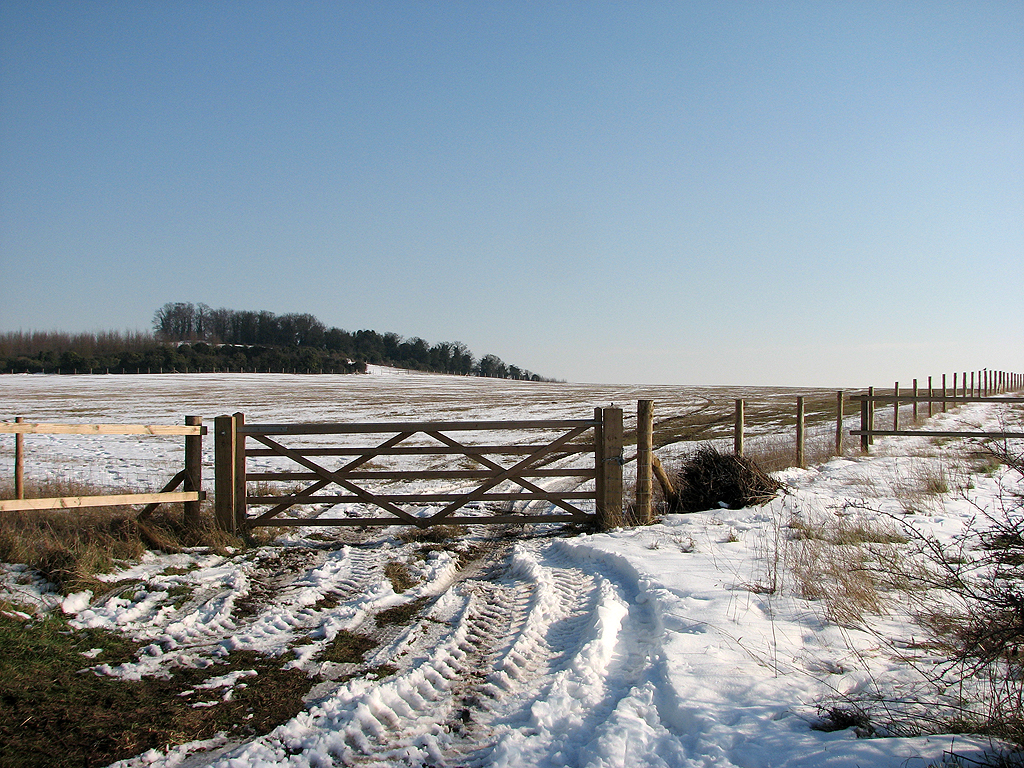
View of Little Trees Hill from Haverhill Road

In 1989 the Magog Trust, a charity and registered company created for the purpose, bought 163.5 acres (66.2 ha) of former farmland surrounding Little Trees Hill for £327,100 so that it could be returned to chalk grassland and opened to the public. The reserve was named Magog Down. Some of the money to buy the land came from the sale of "Gogs" to the general public: these were notional areas of land costing £5 each but without title or rights. As well as re-establishing chalkland plants and insects, Magog Down has become well used for recreation and by dog walkers. A 5-mile running race involving two laps of the reserve and a shorter fun-run have helped raise funds for the local primary school for several years. The Cambridge University Hare and Hounds running club have also used Magog Down as the venue for their tri-annual hosting of the RAF Match.

Magog Down is situated across the A1307 road from the Wandlebury country park (which itself has been managed since 1954 by Cambridge Past, Present & Future). Both Magog Down and Wandlebury Country Park are popular places to visit for fresh air and recreation on the edge of Cambridge.

== Busway proposals ==
In February 2016 the Greater Cambridge City Deal published early-stage "concepts" for improved transport links along the A1307, which included the idea of a new, off-road busway apparently straight across the Gog Magog Hills, possibly through or adjacent to the edge of Magog Down. This concept was met with dismay by both Cambridge Past, Present & Future and the Magog Trust. Later that month reassurances were made that any busway would not go through the hills; the formal consultation document in June 2016 still included an off-road busway option, albeit with the line on the map drawn slightly further south from Magog Down. The preferred options following the 2016 consultation were stated to include an in-bound (towards Cambridge) bus lane alongside the A1307, however by October 2017 the proposal for an off-road busway was back on the agenda again.

== See also ==
- Army Manoeuvres of 1912
- Beechwoods nature reserve
- Chalk Group
- East Cambridgeshire
