= Doria Paston =

English actress and set designer

Doria Paston (née Dorothy Paston Fisher, 1893, Kandy – 1989, East Lambrook) was an English actress and set designer who worked with Terence Gray at the Cambridge Festival Theatre in the 1920s and 1930s. With Gray she co-published the programmes for the plays they put on as the Cambridge Festival Theatre Review.

== Early life ==
Born Dorothy Fisher, she was the daughter of Lionel Paston Fisher and his wife Emma Wood Locket, who were married in Kandy, Ceylon in 1893.

== Work at Cambridge Festival Theatre ==
The architect Hugh Casson learnt set design from her, although he did not share her commitment to abstract and cubist set design.

== Godfishers ==
Doria settled in East Lambrook with her friend Molly Godlonton. The two women were known as the Godfishers and played a role in the community life the Kingsbury Episcopi, where East Lambrook is located. Doria provided paintings while Molly took photographs, many of which have been archived by a local resident. They organised a number of exhibitions of their pictures to raise money for guide dogs for the blind.
