= Cambridge University Hare and Hounds =

Cross-country running club of the University of Cambridge

- Founded: 1880
- Home ground: Wilberforce Road Athletics Track
- Colours: Cambridge Blue
- Head coach: Phil O'Dell

Cambridge University Hare and Hounds (CUH&H) is the cross country running club at the University of Cambridge. It has been providing training and competitions for its members since 7 February 1880. The club's activities take place in multiple locations, with the university's track facilities at Wilberforce Road off Madingley Road; road training around the West Cambridge site; and off-road routes in the nearby countryside and parks, including Jesus Green, the Cambridge towpath, and Grantchester Meadows in Cambridge. Past members include the 1956 Olympic Steeplechase gold medallist Chris Brasher, England international Bruce Tulloh, the Australian miler Herb Elliott, scientist Alan Turing, top 1,500m runner Andrew Baddeley, 2012 Summer Olympics & World Triathlon Champion Alistair Brownlee, and Irish 2020 Olympic 800m runner Louise Shanahan who placed 7th in her heat.

Mike Turner, an international distance runner in the 1960s was CUH&H president for thirty years until his retirement in 2006. The current president is Joan Lasenby.

The focus each winter is on the Varsity match against University of Oxford Cross Country Club, in which competitors may receive a University Sporting Blue on merit of performance. This is one of the oldest annual fixtures of its kind in the world, having been held since 1880, with only world wars and the coronavirus pandemic breaking up the series. The event is currently split over two weekends, with the second to fourth teams competing at Cambridge or Oxford, followed by the first team match at Wimbledon Common.

The second major fixture of the year is the BUCS cross-country championships.
