= Little Trees Hill =

Hill in Cambridgeshire, England

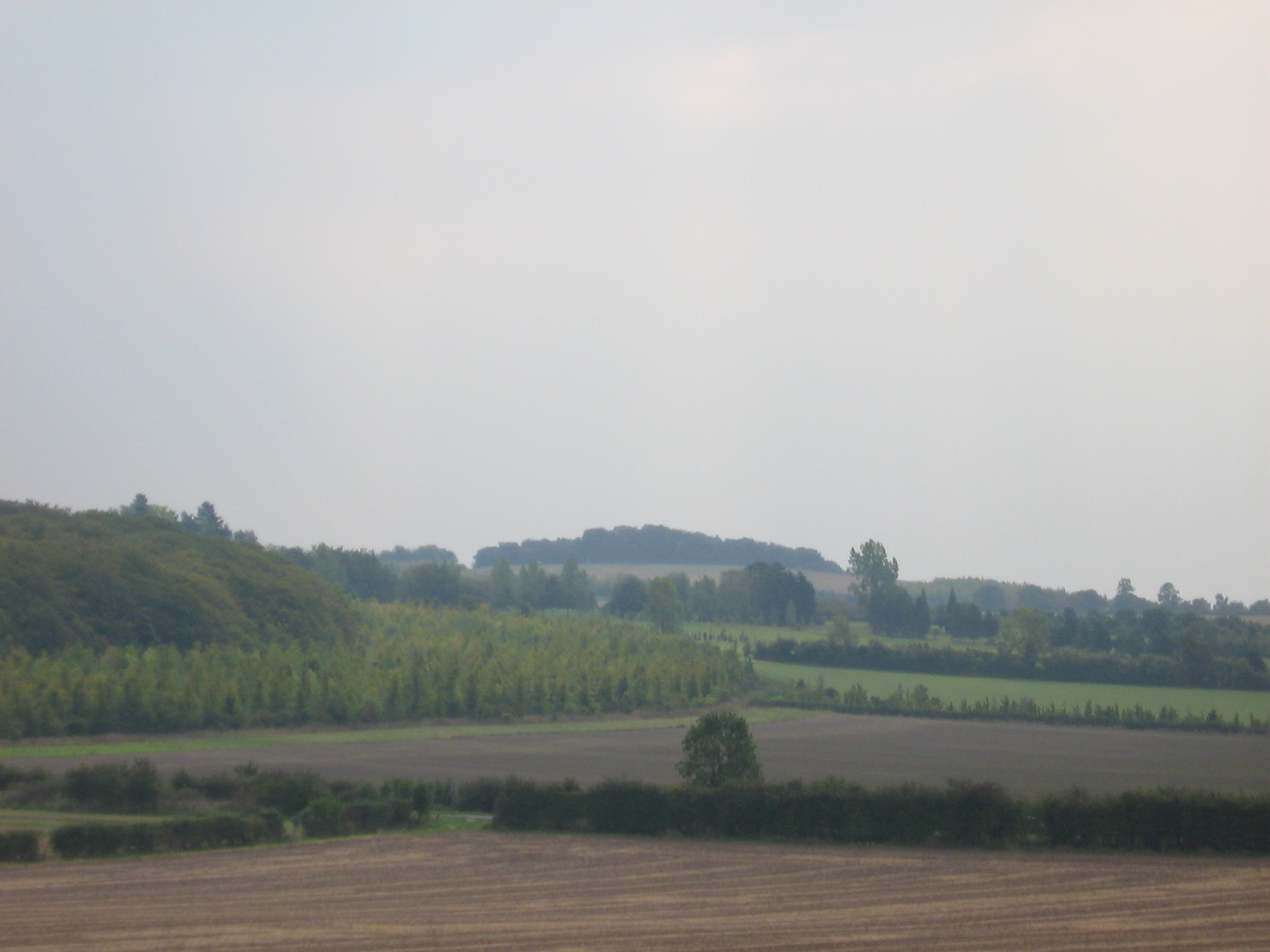
- Little Trees Hill

Highest point
- Elevation: 74 m (243 ft)
- Prominence: 12 m (39 ft)
- Parent peak: Wandlebury Hill
- Listing: (none)
- Coordinates: 52°09′16″N 0°10′25″E

Geography
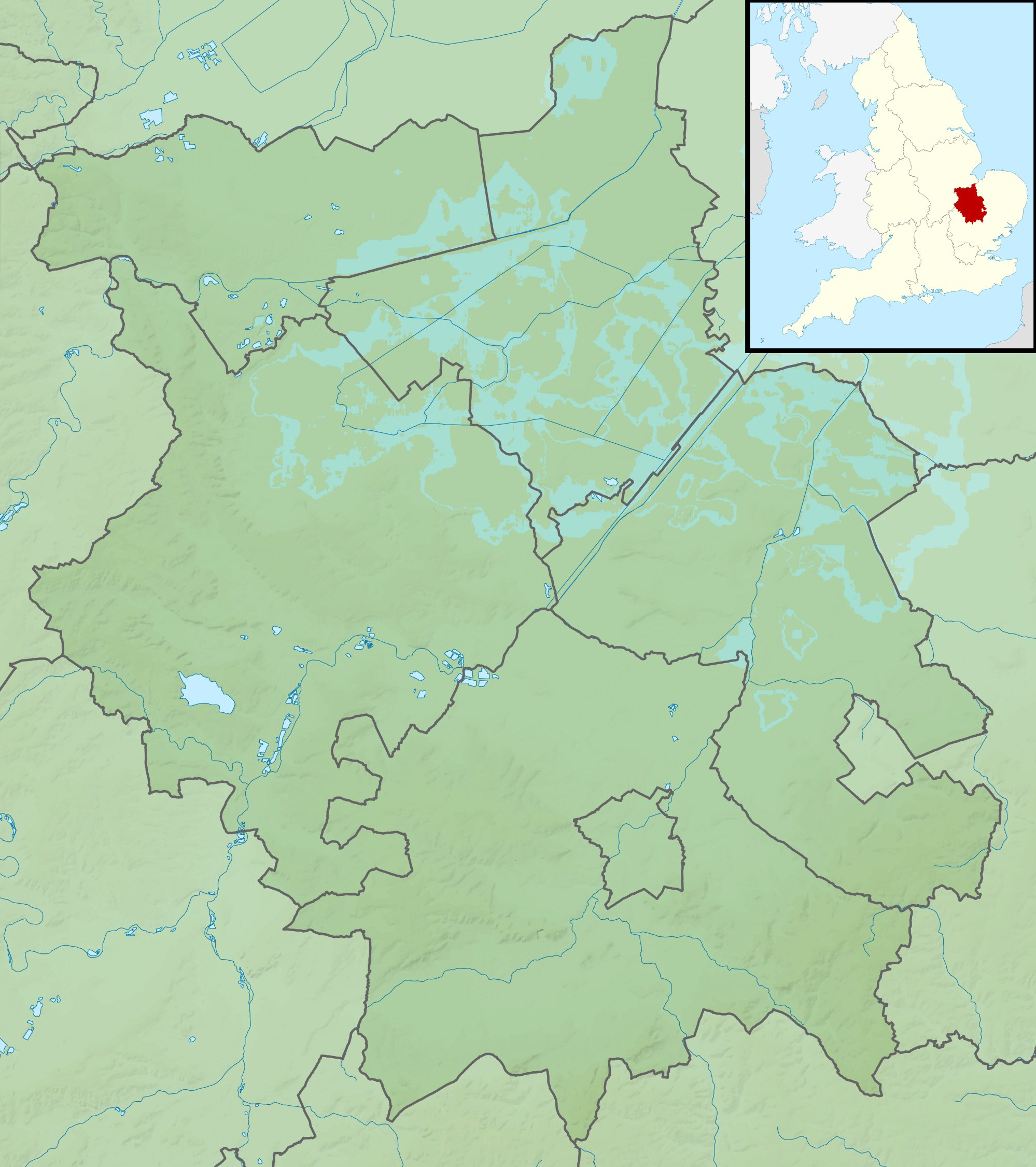
- Location within Cambridgeshire
- Location: Gog Magog Hills, England
- OS grid: TL488529
- Topo map: OS Landranger 154

Little Trees Hill is one of the highest points of the Gog Magog Hills, a ridge of low chalk hills extending for several miles to the south-east of Cambridge in England. Unusually for a Cambridgeshire hill, its summit is reachable on foot, thanks to permissive open access. A footpath runs from the Magog Down car park on Haverhill Road, Stapleford, across the managed meadow called North Down, to the top. The highest point are behind a fence in a wood, but most visitors survey the view from the seats by the fence.

The panorama westward is vast; looking northwest there is no higher ground for 50 miles until the Lincolnshire Wolds. The city of Cambridge is visible, with Addenbrooke's Hospital and the Catholic Church prominent. The Madingley Hills can be seen over the other side of the Cam valley and Castle Hill in Cambridge is prominent. To the southwest, Rowley's Hill and the obelisk on St Margaret's Mount can be seen through binoculars.

The hill is within the 163.5 acres (66.2 ha) privately owned site called Magog Down, which is owned and managed by The Magog Trust. Many circular paths can be used within the site, of varying lengths. The site as a whole is popular with dog walkers and with sledges on the rare occasions when the hill is covered with snow.

The other summit in the range is Wandlebury Hill about 500 metres to the north east and to which this hill is connected by a low ridge.
