= Leper Stone =

Sarsen stone in Essex, England

Coordinates: 51.9918°N 0.2124°E

Map showing the location of The Leper Stone in Essex.

The Leper Stone or Newport Stone (grid reference TL520349) is a large sarsen stone near the village of Newport, Essex, England. The name Leper Stone probably derives from the hospital of St. Mary and St. Leonard (fn. 1156?), a nearby hospital for lepers. Passers by could have left offerings of alms for the hospital residents in a small depression atop the stone; the hospital grounds were sold in the sixteenth century, and only a portion of the wall near the stone remains.

Julian Cope, Peter Herring, UK Geocaching along with D.G. Buckley and Ken Newton's paper for the Council of British Archaeology have suggested that the Leper Stone was set vertically in the ground as a megalithic menhir or standing stone. J.D. Hedges report of 1980 also classified it as a standing stone for English Heritage, who describe this type of monument as A stone or boulder which has been deliberately set upright in the ground. Similarly it has been described as a monolith by the Proceedings of the Cambridge Antiquarian society.
