= Wandlebury Hill =

Country park in Cambridgeshire

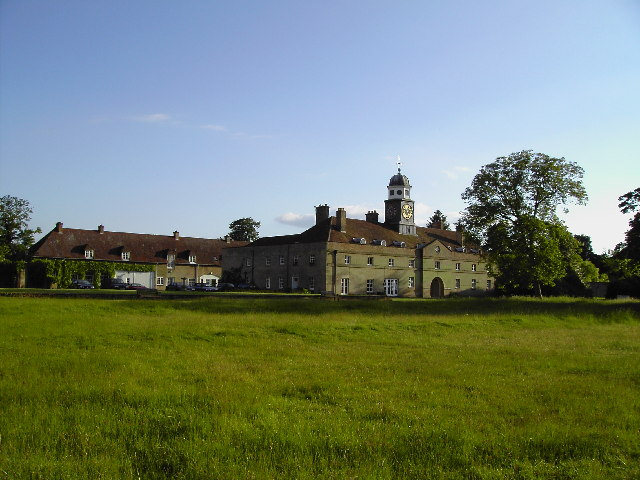
- The stable block at Wandlebury House

Highest point
- Elevation: 74 m (243 ft)
- Prominence: 10 m (33 ft)
- Parent peak: Great Wood Hill
- Coordinates: 52°09′31″N 0°10′57″E

Geography
- Location: Gog Magog Hills, England
- OS grid: TL493533
- Topo map: OS Landranger 154

Wandlebury Hill (grid reference TL493534) is a peak in the Gog Magog Hills, a ridge of low chalk hills extending for several miles to the southeast of Cambridge, England. The underlying rock is present in a number of places on the hill. At 74 metres (243 ft) it is the same height as the nearby Little Trees Hill, although the latter is a more notable landmark.

The top stands in Wandlebury Country Park, a nature reserve owned by Cambridge Past, Present & Future (registered charity number 204122), formerly known as the Cambridge Preservation Society. Wandlebury was already inhabited in the Bronze Age and 2500 years ago there was an Iron Age hill fort here known as Wandlebury Ring. This hill fort once had concentric ditches and earthen walls which were kept in place by wooden palisades. Although the fort has vanished, the ditch (the Ring) dug around the edge can clearly be seen and walked along, being 5 metres deep in places and offering an adventurous route along its edge. There is no evidence that it was ever used in defence.

The reserve, mainly beech woodlands and fields, is a place for birdwatching. Banyard bird hide, overlooking Varley's Field, was completed in February 2012. Like Little Trees Hill, the summit is on public land and is accessible when sheep or Highland cattle are not in the field. Dogs must be on a lead everywhere in Wandlebury Country Park. It can be reached by walking across the field from post 3 of the nature trail. Virtually no climb is involved in the ascent, just a stroll through woodland.

== Wandlebury House ==
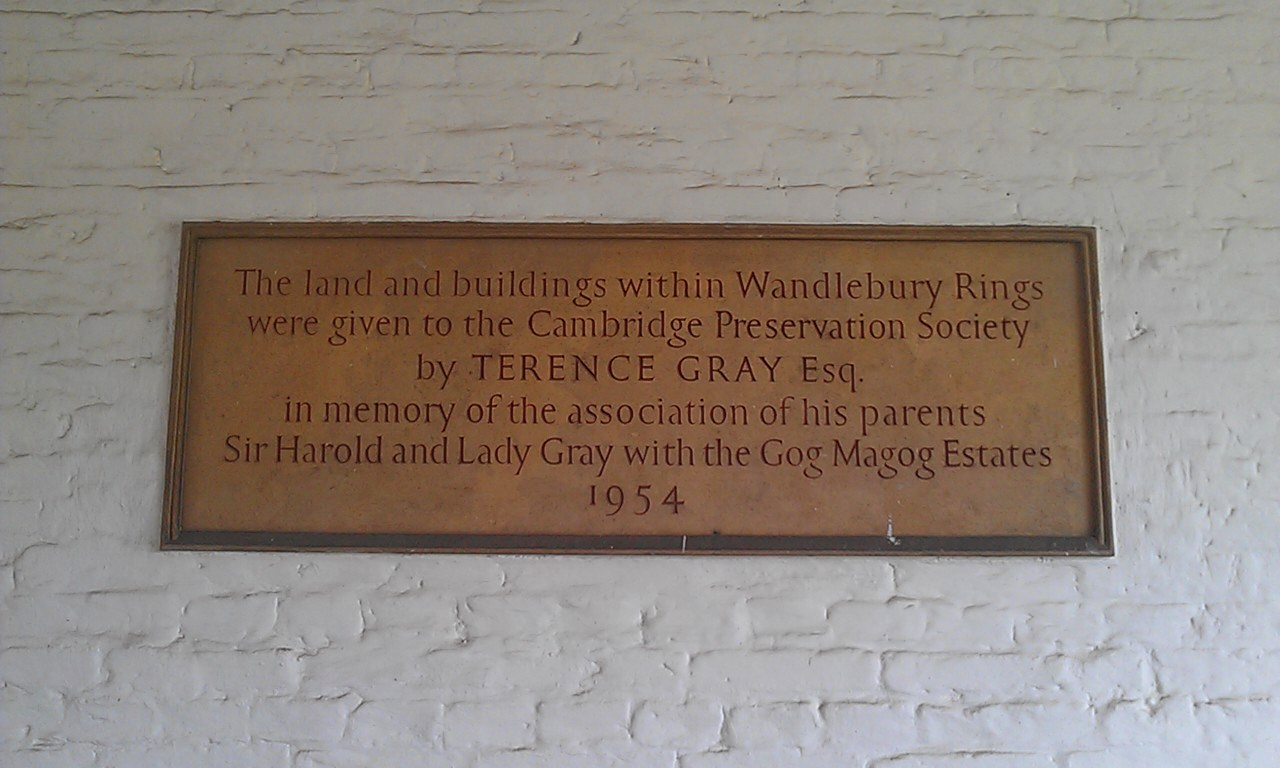
Plaque on Wandlebury stables recording the gift of land by Terence Gray in memory of his parents, 1954

Wandlebury House, home of among others Francis Godolphin, 2nd Earl of Godolphin, stood within the Ring. The house was demolished in the 1950s but the monumental stable block remains, now used for accommodation and as headquarters office of Cambridge Past, Present & Future. The grave of the Godolphin Barb horse, which died in 1753, can be seen under the archway. Maps and leaflets are available from the porch at all times and from a shed in the car park on summer Sundays. The tail of a crashed World War II Wellington Bomber was visible wedged high in a beech tree within the estate, until it was dislodged by strong winds in the early 1990s.

== Archaeoastronomical speculation ==
A number of hypotheses have been made about a supposed "Wandlebury enigma"; the purpose, function and decoration of Wandlebury Hill.

The first is the suggestion that an ancient hill figure had once been carved into the side of Wandlebury Hill, similar to the Cerne Abbas Giant. This was thought to have been overgrown or effaced in the 18th century. The figure was first recorded by Bishop Joseph Hall in 1605 and later by others including William Cole and John Layer. Investigation was carried out in 1954 by T. C. Lethbridge, an archaeologist and parapsychologist. He found small lumps of chalk to the south of the hill and proceeded to survey the area with a sounding bar, probing areas of soft ground and disturbed chalk. By placing markers he was able to draw out the pattern of what he claimed were 3 hill figures picturing ancient British deities - A horse goddess (Magog or Epona), a Sun god (Gog, Bel, Belinus or Lucifer) and a warrior figure with sword and shield. The Times reported on Lethbridge's discovery as a "previously lost, three thousand-year-old hill-figure". A later article about Lethbridge's efforts was written by W. A. Clark in 1997 which did not confirm his claims, nor did magnetometer and resistivity meter testing. The suggestion was dismissed by Glyn Daniel who commented that Lethbridge had not found any real antiquities but was "probably confusing geological features". A report by the Council for British Archaeology concluded that the 'hollows' were caused by common geological processes.

== See also ==
- List of hill forts in England
- List of hill forts in Scotland
- List of hill forts in Wales
