= Harcamlow Way =

Long-distance footpath in East of England

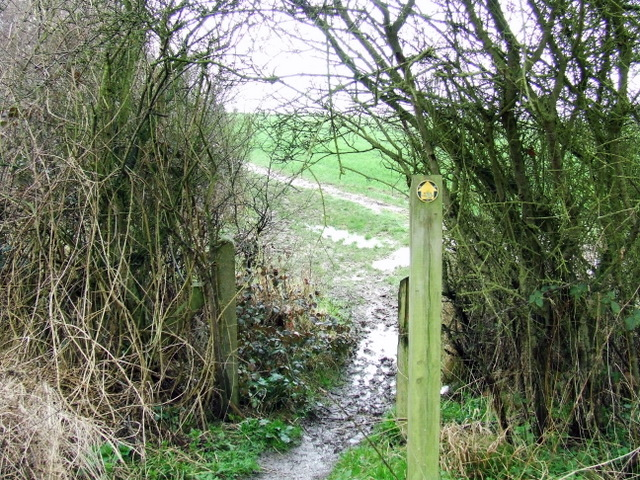
- On the Harcamlow Way near Takeley, Essex
- Length: 141 miles (227 km)
- Location: Essex, Hertfordshire and Cambridgeshire
- Use: Hiking
- Maintained by: Redbridge Ramblers

The Harcamlow Way is a waymarked walking route in England running in a figure-of-eight from Harlow to Cambridge and back again, hence its portmanteau name. On the way it runs through Essex, Hertfordshire and Cambridgeshire. The route is 141 miles (227 km) long.

The Harcamlow Way is one of the earliest of the waymarked walking trails in this part of the country. It was developed by Fred Matthews and Harry Bitten of the West Essex Ramblers' Association in the 1970s and began to appear on Ordnance Survey maps.

The walk is mainly on tracks and green lanes, taking in the wide tracts of countryside in eastern Hertfordshire, western Essex and southern Cambridgeshire, mostly within what is now known as The Hundred Parishes and dropping into many villages on the way, passing many places of historic interest.

== The route ==
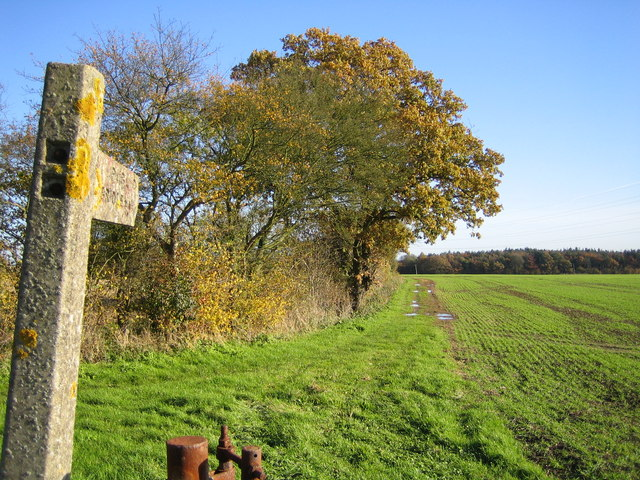
Northey Common, Essex

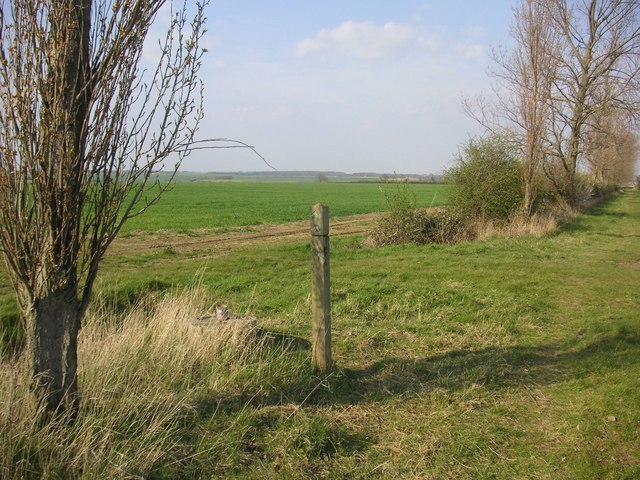
South-west of Kingston, Cambridgeshire

The walk, starting clockwise, heads north out of Harlow and straight over the county border into Hertfordshire, heading for Bishop's Stortford and thence to Manuden and on to Newport, Essex, which is the crossing-over point of the two loops. North of Newport, it goes north-east to Audley End and through Saffron Walden town centre, then north-east to Ashdon and across into Cambridgeshire at Bartlow and on to Horseheath. After following for a little way a Roman Road north-westwards, it heads north to Balsham and then north-west along the Fleam Dyke to Fulbourn and into the Little Wilbraham Fen, and drops into Cambridge from the north, along the River Cam. The route then heads west out of Cambridge to Coton and beyond before going south again, through Kingston and the Wimpole Estate, parallel to Ermine Street. It takes ancient Ashwell Street to Melbourn, then south across the Icknield Way back into Essex.

In Essex the southbound trail passes through Chrishall and Chrishall Common, past Essex's highest point, and Langley, to Arkesden and back to Newport, where the loops cross.

Deeper into Essex there is a tangle of footpaths and bridleways. The Harcamlow Way here runs to Debden and Thaxted, then south to Takeley and south-west to the county border with Hertfordshire on the River Stort opposite Sawbridgeworth, which river it follows down back to Harlow.

At least two published books describe the route in detail.
