= Fleam Dyke =

Linear earthwork and Site of Special Scientific Interest

Coordinates: 52.16°N 0.266°E

- Site of Special Scientific Interest
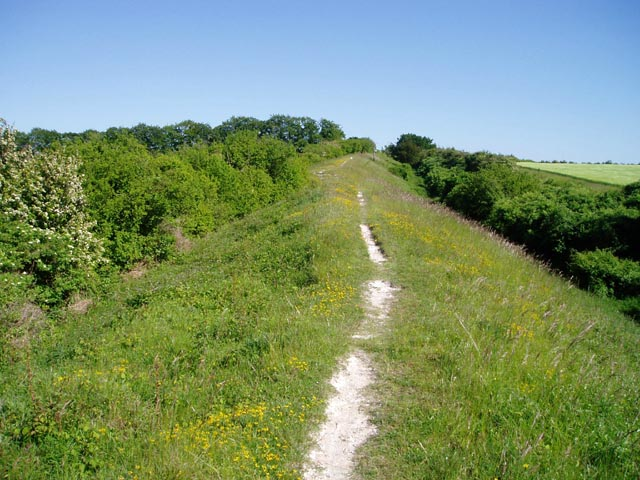
- Fleam Dyke with overgrown ditch to right (west)
- Location of Fleam Dyke.
- Area of search: Cambridgeshire
- Grid reference: TL 551 539
- Interest: Biological
- Area: 7.8 hectares
- Notification date: 1984
- Location map: Magic Map

Fleam Dyke is a linear earthwork between Fulbourn and Balsham in Cambridgeshire, initiated some time between AD 330 and AD 510. It is three miles long and seven metres high from ditch to bank, and its ditch faces westwards, implying invading Saxons as its architects. Later, it formed a boundary of the Anglo-Saxon administrative division of Flendish Hundred. At a prominent point, the earthwork runs beside Mutlow Hill, crowned by a 4000-year-old Bronze Age burial mound.

== Description ==
The dyke is located near Cambridge, between Fulbourn and Balsham. It forms a barrier across an open chalkland ridge, bounded near Fulbourn by marshy fenland and near Balsham by 90-metre-high formerly wooded hills ("The Ambush"). It is three miles long and seven metres high from ditch to bank, and its ditch faces southwest. Most of the earthwork survives and a footpath leads along the crest of the bank (now part of the modern Harcamlow Way long-distance footpath). Possible extensions to Fleam Dyke occur at both the south and north ends, and a further part of it might exist three miles to the northwest, from Quy Fen to the River Cam at Fen Ditton.

== History ==
At Mutlow Hill the dyke runs beside a Bronze Age barrow dated to 2000 BC, which contained eight urns with cremated human remains, and which was reused in the Roman period as a shrine. The finding of a fourth-century Roman coin under the dyke established the dyke's post-Roman construction date. In the nineteenth and early twentieth centuries Anglo-Saxon weapons and burials were found. An excavation in 1991, on occasion of widening the A11 road, established by radiocarbon dating that it had been built in several phases, the first between AD 330 and 510, and the last between AD 450 and 620. It is believed most likely to have been built by early Anglo-Saxon settlers in the fifth century AD as a defence against Romano-British attempts to recover their territory.

In later Anglo-Saxon times, the northern part of Fleam Dyke was also the boundary between Flendish and Staine Hundreds (county subdivisions). In this period, when villages grew and parish boundaries were established, parishes in this part of the county were long and narrow stretching from the fens to the presumed Icknield Way (now the A11) as this gave access to wood from the uplands, thatching from the fens and fertile local soil. Thus, what is now Stow-cum-Quy (with its potentially separate section of Fleam Dyke) was originally the northern part of the two Wilbraham villages (Great Wilbraham and Little Wilbraham) situated near the main Fleam Dyke. The main part of Fleam Dyke today still constitutes a parish boundary.

== Context ==
The profiles of the Cambridgeshire dykes, based on Charles Henry Hartshorne’s Salopia Antiqua (1841)

Chalk band (pale green) where the chalk ridge, the Icknield Way, and the dykes are located

Fleam Dyke is one of four substantial earthworks in south Cambridgeshire, each a high bank with a ditch on its southwest side, running across the chalk downland ridge that carries the presumed Icknield Way (and the Roman Road). The others are the Devil's Dyke, Brent Ditch and Bran Ditch. In Suffolk, to the north west of Bury St Edmunds, a fifth earthwork, Black Ditches, guards the Icknield Way. Malim (1997) notes that Fleam Dyke experienced at least three phases of construction and thus had the most complex history of the earthworks, and suggests this could be "because it was built, taken, then retaken and refortified a number of times during the fluctuating fortunes of war during the Dark Ages."

== Ecology ==
Fleam Dyke is one of 286 sites selected by Charles Rothschild in 1912 to 1915 as wildlife sites "worthy of preservation" in Britain and Ireland. The steep banks of the earthwork have species-rich chalk grassland, a rare habitat in the county. The dyke, which is maintained by grass cutting, is the only Cambridgeshire site for the common juniper. The entire length is now a Scheduled Monument and a 7.8-hectare (19-acre) biological Site of Special Scientific Interest.
