= Hertfordshire Way =

194-mile circular walk in Hertfordshire, England

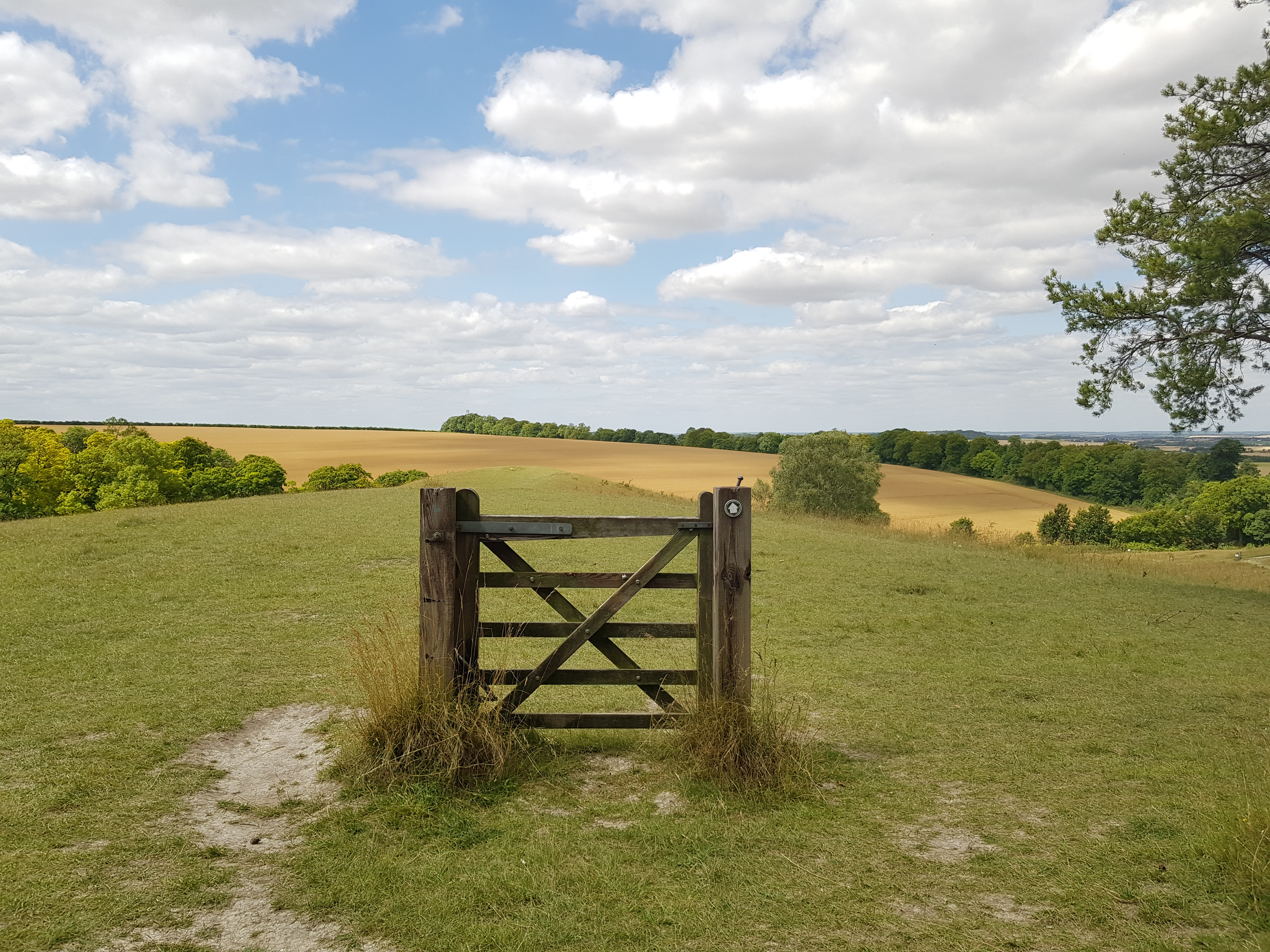
- Gate with Hertfordshire Way sign, Therfield Heath
- Length: 195 mi (314 km)
- Location: Hertfordshire, England
- Established: 1996
- Trailheads: Royston, Hertfordshire
- Use: Hiking
- Season: All year
- Maintainer: Friends of The Hertfordshire Way
- Website: http://www.fhw.org.uk/

Trail map
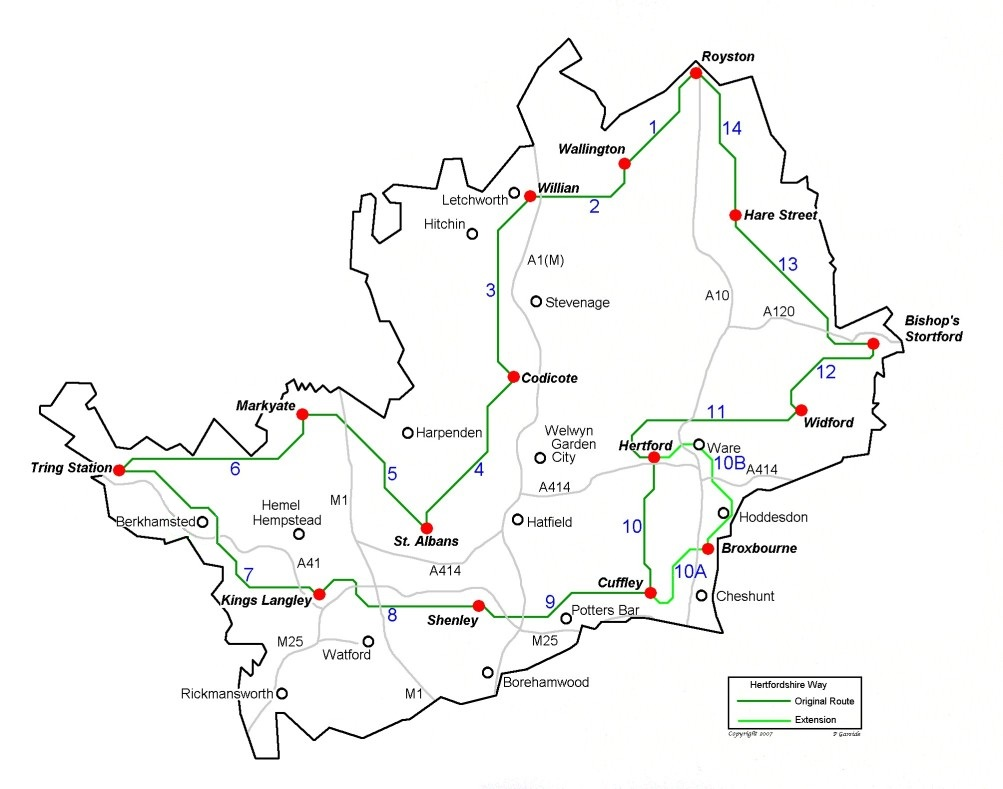

The Hertfordshire Way is a circular walk around the county of Hertfordshire, England. The total length is 312 km (194 mi) which was originally fully waymarked in the anticlockwise direction but is now waymarked in both directions. One section has two optional routes reducing the possible length to 271 km (168 mi).

The walk is mainly in open countryside, some less than 20 miles from central London, but also passes through the historic city of St Albans, the County town of Hertford, and the towns of Royston and Bishop’s Stortford. Several of the smaller, attractive villages of Hertfordshire are also encompassed in the route.

The route is formally divided into 16 sections most of which are accessible using public transport but as a circular walk it can be used to suit the wishes of the walker.

The walk was planned and is cared for by The Friends of the Hertfordshire Way. Funding for maintenance of way marks etc. is provided through subscriptions and donations to the group and sale of the guidebook.

== History ==
The route originally started development in 1995 as part of the celebrations to mark 60 years of the Ramblers Association but it was not until 1996 that the route was officially established with the first issue of the guidebook published in 1998. At that time, it was 267 km (166 mi) in length. Over subsequent years amendments and additions have been made. A second edition was published in 2009. A third edition was published in 2017 (ISBN 9781901037241) and is available from the Friends of The Hertfordshire Way. The third edition builds on the previous editions and adjusts to the route to avoid recent housing and highway developments and also to address a small number of access concerns. These changes particularly affect legs 7,8,12 and 13.

== Route ==
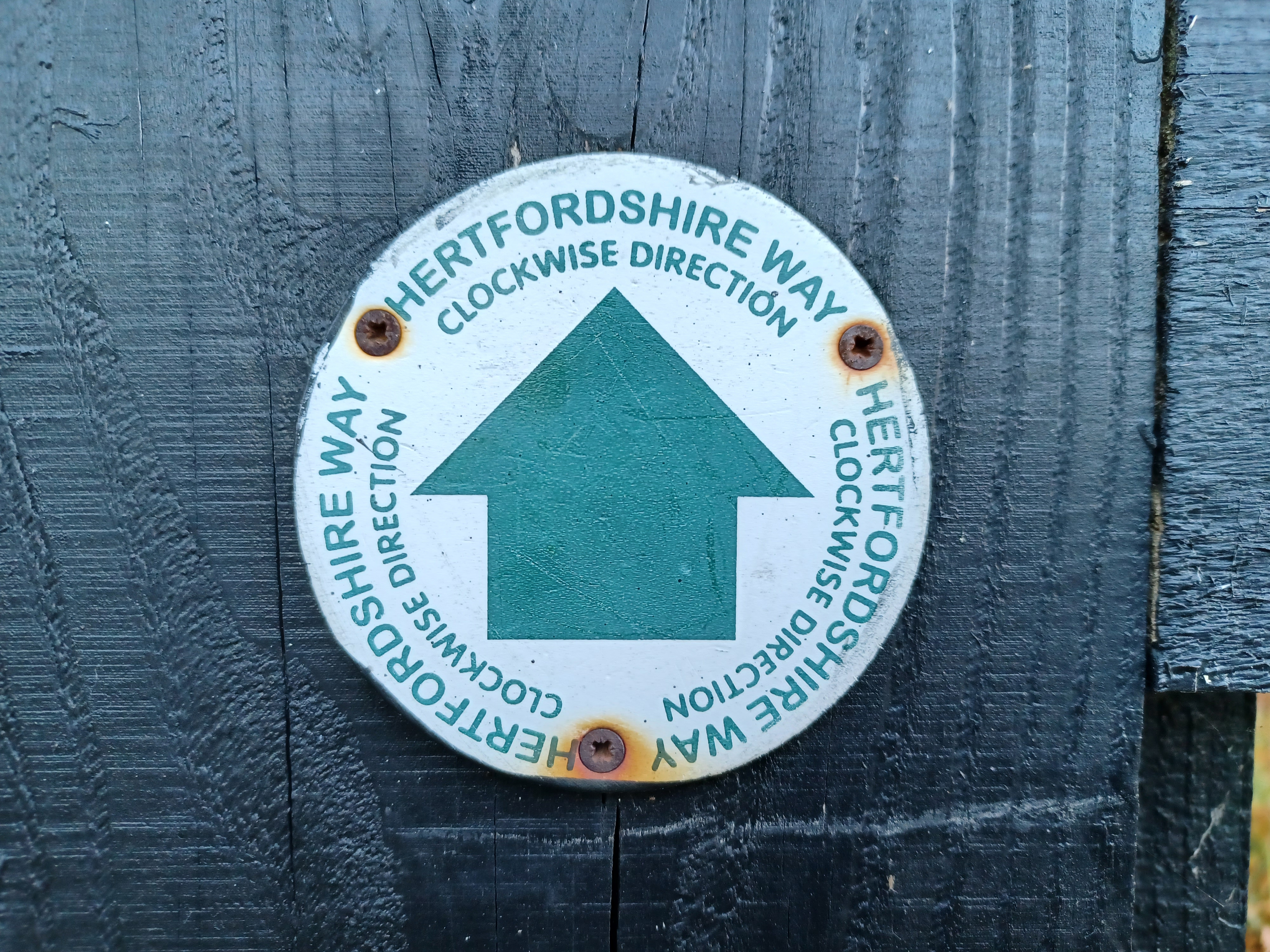
Hertfordshire Way waymarker

The route is divided into 16 legs the shortest being around 17 km (11 mi) and the longest 24 km (15 mi) in length. The route starts in North East Hertfordshire at Royston.

=== Leg 1 ===
Royston to Wallington. This leg is just over 17 km (11 mi) and passes across Therfield Heath and along parts of the ridge of North Hertfordshire with long views over Bedfordshire and Cambridgeshire. Pasque Flowers can be seen around Easter on Therfield Heath. The route passes through the villages of Therfield, Kelshall and Sandon before arriving at Wallington. Wallington is one of the few places with poor public transport.

=== Leg 2 ===
Wallington to Little Wymondley. This leg is about 20 km (12 mi) and passes through the villages of Clothall, Weston and Graveley. After passing under the A1M it continues west before turning south through Great Wymondley to finish at Little Wymondley.

=== Leg 3 ===
Little Wymondley to Codicote. This leg is about 15 km (9.3 mi). Soon after the start of this leg there is a difficult crossing of the A602 before heading to Titmore Green. The route continues south through Almshoebury, St Pauls Walden, with connections to Queen Elizabeth the Queen Mother (Bowes-Lyon), and Whitwell before arriving at Codicote.

=== Leg 4 ===
Codicote to St Albans. This leg is about 20 km (12 mi) passing through Ayot St. Lawrence and Shaw's Corner (George Bernard Shaw), Wheathampstead, Coleman Green and Sandridge and having skirted the north of St Albans finishes at Verulam Museum illustrating the Roman history of the town.

=== Leg 5 ===
St Albans to Markyate. This leg is approximately 18 km (11 mi) via the villages of Redbourn and Flamstead.

=== Leg 6 ===
Markyate to Tring Station. This leg is 18 km (11 mi). The route goes via Great and Little Gaddesden to the National Trust open space of the Ashridge Estate where you have a good chance of seeing fallow deer before descending to Aldbury and Tring Station.

=== Leg 7 ===
Tring Station to Kings Langley. This is the longest leg being 24 km (15 mi). The route follows the southern edge of the Ashridge Estate, crosses Berkhamsted common then turns south to Berkhamsted castle then joining the Grand Union Canal to Bourne End. Finally it leaves the Bulbourne valley via a steady climb to reach Bovingdon, Chipperfield and the descent to Kings Langley. This leg can be divided into two shorter sections, typically around Berkhamsted.

=== Leg 8 ===
Kings Langley to Shenley. This leg is 20 km (12 mi). The route remains mainly in open countryside despite its proximity to the M25 corridor and Hemel Hempstead, Watford and St. Albans passing through Abbotts Langley, Aldenham and Letchmore Heath.

=== Leg 9 ===
Shenley to Cuffley. This leg is 18.5 km (11.5 mi). The route passes South Mimms and the northern edge of Potters Bar and Northaw to reach Cuffley.

=== Leg 10 ===
Cuffley to Hertford. This is the original route of the walk but legs 10A and 10B provide an alternative to Hertford. This leg is just over 20 km (12 mi) almost all in rolling countryside via Newgate Street, Essendon, Little Berkhamsted, and Bayford to finish in the County town of Hertford.

=== Leg 10A ===
Cuffley to Broxbourne. This is the first stage of the alternative route to Hertford. The leg is just over 19 km (12 mi) via Goffs Oak and Hammond Street then skirting Hoddesdon in woodland before arriving in Broxbourne.

=== Leg 10B ===
Broxbourne to Hertford. This is the second stage of the alternative route to Hertford; it is 20 km (12 mi) long. The route starts following the river Lea to Rye House and Stansted Abbotts before briefly entering The Ash Valley and then resuming with the river Lea from Great Amwell into Hertford.

=== Leg 11 ===
Hertford to Widford. This leg is 22 km (14 mi). This route follows three tributaries of the river Lea: the Beane as far as Stapleford, the Rib from Wadesmill to Thundridge and the Ash from Wareside.

=== Leg 12 ===
Widford to Bishop’s Stortford. This leg is almost 16.5 km (10.3 mi). The route initially follows the river Ash to Much Hadham before heading to Perry Green former home of Henry Moore and then on to Green Tye, Dane Bridge and Bury Green toward the river Stort and Bishop’s Stortford. The walk ends on the outskirts of town.

=== Leg 13 ===
Bishop’s Stortford to Hare Street. This leg is a little over 17 km (11 mi) almost all in the open countryside of North East Hertfordshire.It passes Cradle End and Millfield Cottages prior to crossing the A120 at Stone House Farm. It rejoins the original route at Hadham Hall. Finally it passes through Upwick Green, Patmore Heath and Little Hornmead to finish in Hare Street

=== Leg 14 ===
Hare Street to Royston. The final leg is 20 km (12 mi) again in open countryside some with long views north as the escarpment is reached and passing the villages of Great Hornmead, Little Hornmead, and Ansty. Approaching Nuthampstead you pass the WW2 airfield and USAF Memorial to 398 squadron before completing the trail at Royston via Barkway and Reed.

== Connecting Trails ==
The following trails intersect with the Hertfordshire Way:

- Ridgeway National Trail
- Icknield Way
- Hertfordshire Border Walk
- Lea Valley Walk
- Chiltern Way
- Grand Union Canal Walk
- Hertfordshire Chain Walk
- Harcamlow Way

== Transport ==
The eastern side of the County (Broxbourne, Hertford, and Bishops Stortford) is served by rail from London Liverpool Street station. The North East (Royston, Letchworth, Cuffley, and Hertford) are served from London Kings Cross or Moorgate. The Centre (St Albans) is served by Thameslink from St Pancras whilst the west (Kings Langley, Berkhamsted and Tring) is served from London Euston. Full details of rail services and intermediate stations can be obtained from National Rail. Details of local bus services can be obtained using either the Intalink website or both rail and bus via Traveline South East.

== Maps ==
The route is identified on the following OS Explorer (1:25000) maps: 174; 181; 182; 193; 194;
