= Bran Ditch =

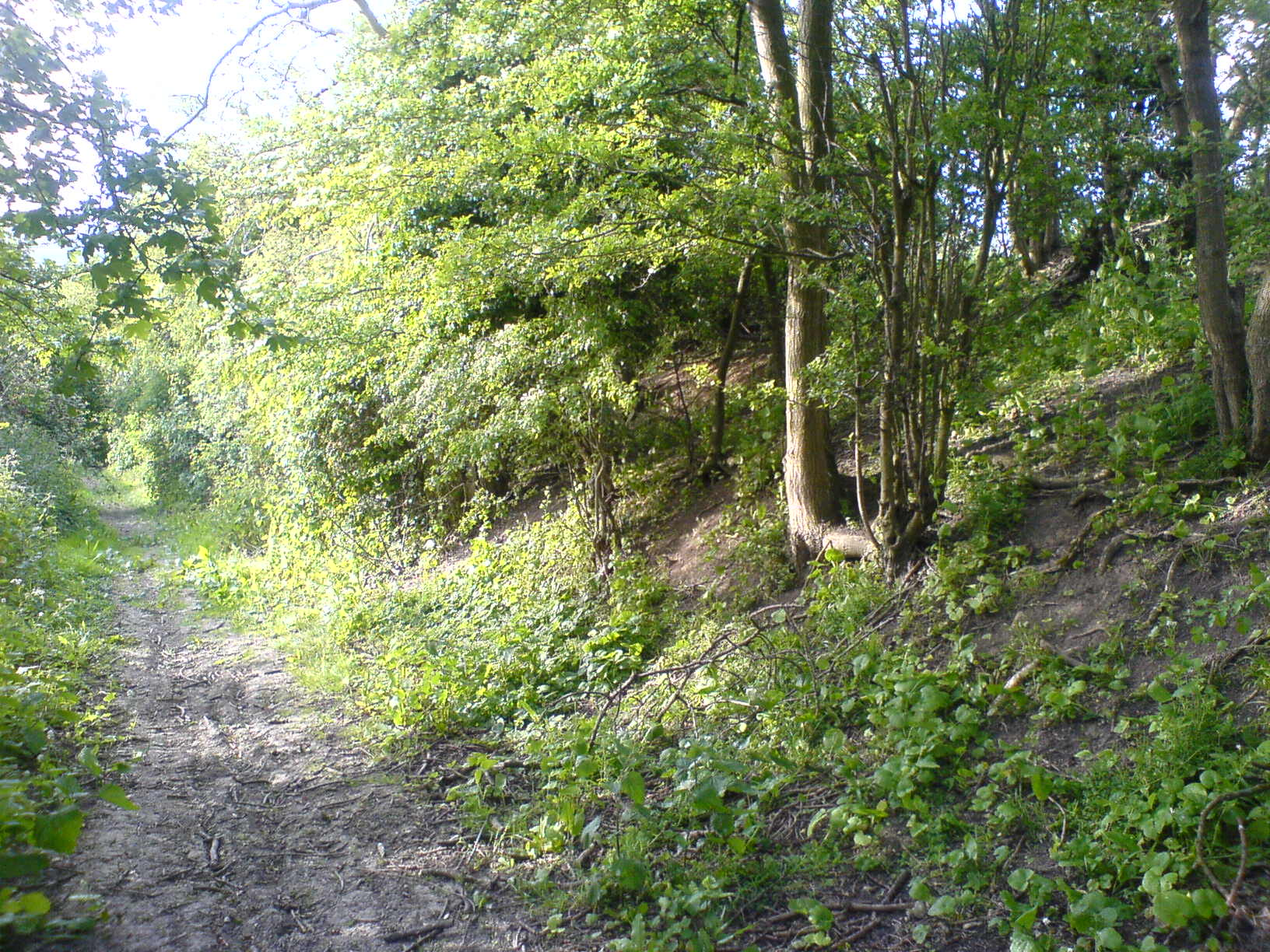
Bran Ditch

Bran Ditch or Heydon Ditch is generally assumed to be an Anglo-Saxon earthwork in southern Cambridgeshire, England.

Most of the ditch has been lost to agriculture over time, but its line its marked throughout by both hedgerow and the route of the Harcomlow Way and Icknield Way paths. It would have consisted of an earth bank and ditch running for approximately 5 km (~3 miles) north-west from higher land at Heydon through what is now the golf course at Heydon Grange, crossing the A505 road and to Black Peak at the southernmost tip of Fowlmere RSPB reserve. At this northern terminus of the ditch is an iron-age enclosure. This whole length of the ditch, and the enclosure, is classified as a scheduled ancient monument.

Beginning on the fringes of Heydon Village, the ditch's course quickly descends from the higher ground (120m) to the flatter agricultural landscape below (55m). On the hill the earthworks are lightly wooded and it is at this higher point at which the dyke's course and workings are best viewed. Its line to the north can be seen through gaps in the trees in the fields below and what remains of its banks are best preserved there. For a short distance the workings are several metres high as the footpath descends the hill through the ditch and onto the flatter ground below. Down here only a slightly raised straight path and a hedgerow line are clues to former glories.

== History ==
Using data from the other dykes, archaeological Carbon-14 dating suggests that work on the dyke(s) made during the 6th and 7th centuries. It would have been used as a defensive structure as well as a means controlling trade along Roman roads that cross the dyke, including the Icknield Way.

Like the other works to the East, it fell from use within a few hundred years of concept. At a much later date it is assumed that much of its length would have been flattened as part of agriculture reforms.

The dyke is one of the shorter of several earthworks in south Cambridgeshire designed to control movement along the ancient Roman roads. The others are Devil's Dyke, Fleam Dyke and Brent Ditch. Black Ditches, Cavenham is a fifth earthwork guarding the ancient Icknield Way and can be found in Suffolk just north west of Bury St Edmunds.

Much of the substance of Bran Ditch has been lost over time and it is the least preserved and least impressive of the five structures.

== Heritage ==
The ditch offers shelter to wildlife, in what otherwise would be an open and agricultural landscape. It is best accessed from the south at Heydon (OS map reference TL431405).
