= Black Ditches, Cavenham =

Archaeological site in Suffolk, England

- Site of Special Scientific Interest
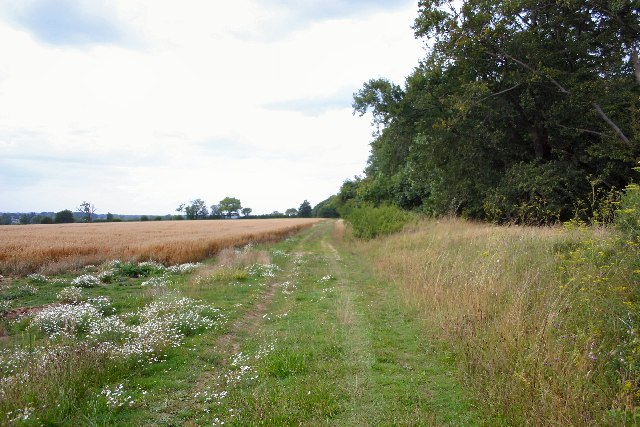
- Black Ditches, southern section

- Black Ditches within Suffolk
- Location of Black Ditches, Cavenham.
- Area of search: Suffolk
- Grid reference: TL774684
- Coordinates: 52.2908°N 0.5985°E
- Interest: Biological
- Area: 1.6 hectares
- Notification date: 1984
- Location map: Magic Map

Black Ditches is an earthwork close to the village of Cavenham of Suffolk, and part of it is a biological Site of Special Scientific Interest (SSSI). The earthwork is 4.5 miles long between the River Lark at Lackford and the Icknield Way. It is described by the Suffolk Historic Environment Record as having no direct dating evidence but "by analogy with other linear earthworks in the region it is usually assumed to be post Roman".

Two sections of ditch remain visible, one to the north-east of the village and one to the south-east, covering a total of 4.5 miles (7.2 km). An 730 yards (670 m) stretch south of Cavenham is designated as an SSSI. Access to the Black Ditches is limited, with no public right of way.

== History ==
Cyril Fox thought Black Ditches was the most easterly of a series of five earthworks that defended the East Anglian kingdom of the Wuffings along the Icknield Way, the others being collectively known as the Cambridgeshire Dykes – Devil's Dyke, Fleam Dyke, Bran Ditch and Brent Ditch. It is not as well preserved as the western defences.

A small excavation in 1992 found that the Black Ditches had a ditch on either side of the bank. Only Iron Age pottery was recovered in this excavation.

The total length of the ditches is around 4.5 miles (7.2 km) stretching from south of Cavenham towards Icklingham, although there is no evidence of the ditch crossing the River Lark at Icklingham. The Icknield Way crosses the line of the ditch towards the central area. In this area the ditch is generally no longer visible.

The northern section of ditch remaining is around 0.65 miles (1.05 km) in length running across the eastern edge of Cavenham Heath towards the River Lark. The section is less well preserved, although up to 1.75 metres (5.7 ft) high and 8 metres (26 ft) wide in places. This section is not designated as an SSSI although it lies on the boundary of the Breckland Farmland SSSI. This section lies entirely within the parish of Cavenham.

The southern section of the ditch is 1.25 miles (2.01 km) long, extending southwards in some form across Risby's Poor Heath. This section forms the boundary of Cavenham and Lackford parishes before it enters Risby parish to the south.

== Plant and wildlife ==
The Site of Special Scientific Interest covers the southern section of ditch and is 1.7 hectares (4.2 acres) in area. It is bordered on the west by the Breckland Farmland SSSI.

Black Ditches provides an example of chalk grassland on its banks. A wide variety of species are present and the site is especially well preserved as it is believed that it has never been ploughed. The dominant grass species are Crested Hair-grass Koeleria cristata, Timothy Grass Phleum pratense and Common Quaking-grass Briza media. Herb species include the locally rare Heath Sedge Carex ericetorum and Bastard Toadflax Comandra umbellata. Scrub has developed along the edge of the ditch where it is sheltered by woodland.
