= Heydon, Cambridgeshire =

Village in Cambridgeshire, England

Coordinates: 52.0399°N 0.08695°E

Heydon
- Location within Cambridgeshire
- Population: 243 (2011 Census)
- OS grid reference: TL429393
- Shire county: Cambridgeshire
- Region: East
- Country: England
- Sovereign state: United Kingdom
- Post town: Royston
- Postcode district: SG8

Heydon is a village and civil parish in Cambridgeshire, England.

The parish of Heydon was transferred from Essex to Cambridgeshire in 1894. The area of the parish is 862 hectares (2,130 acres). It is situated on one of the highest places in Cambridgeshire, with the nearby village of Great Chishill being the very highest.

Heydon has the King William IV as its only pub. The village also has the Wood Green Animal Shelter Small Animals Rescue Home. And on the edge of Heydon it has its own golf course, Heydon Grange Golf Club, consisting of an 18-hole and 9-hole golf course with driving range.

Holy Trinity church, in the centre of the village, was seriously damaged in a bombing raid in 1940. The south arcade was undamaged as was the chancel (which is from 1866) but the north aisle and the nave were entirely rebuilt. Holy Trinity is part of the parish of the Icknield Way together with the Chishills, Chrishall, Elmdon with Wenden Lofts and Strethall churches.

The Anglo-Saxon earthwork Bran Ditch rises in Heydon and runs to Fowlmere.

The Icknield Way Path passes through the village on its 110-mile journey from Ivinghoe Beacon in Buckinghamshire to Knettishall Heath in Suffolk. The Icknield Way Trail, a multi-user route for walkers, horse riders and off-road cyclists, also passes close to the village.

== See also ==
- The Hundred Parishes
