= Pampisford Hall =

Country house in Pampisford, Cambridgeshire, England

Coordinates: 52.1134°N 0.2029°E

- Interactive map of the Pampisford Hall area

General information
- Location: Pampisford, Cambridgeshire, England

Design and construction
- Architect: George Goldie

Pampisford Hall is a country house designed by George Goldie in the civil parish of Pampisford in the English county of Cambridgeshire. It became a Grade II listed building on 29 October 1974. The hall's gates and gate piers are also Grade II listed.

The gardens are Grade II* listed on the Register of Historic Parks and Gardens. They are not open to the public.
