= Roman Road =

Roman Road could refer to:

- Roman Road, London
- Roman Road, Cambridgeshire
- Roman Road railway station (Kent)
- Roman Road railway station (Yorkshire)
- Roman Road of Agrippa (Saintes–Lyon)
- Roman Road from Saintes to Périgueux
- Roman Road (film)

== See also ==
- Roman roads
  - Roman roads in Africa
  - Roman roads in Britannia
- All roads lead to Rome
