= Lackford =

Village in Suffolk, England

Coordinates: 52.301°N 0.626°E

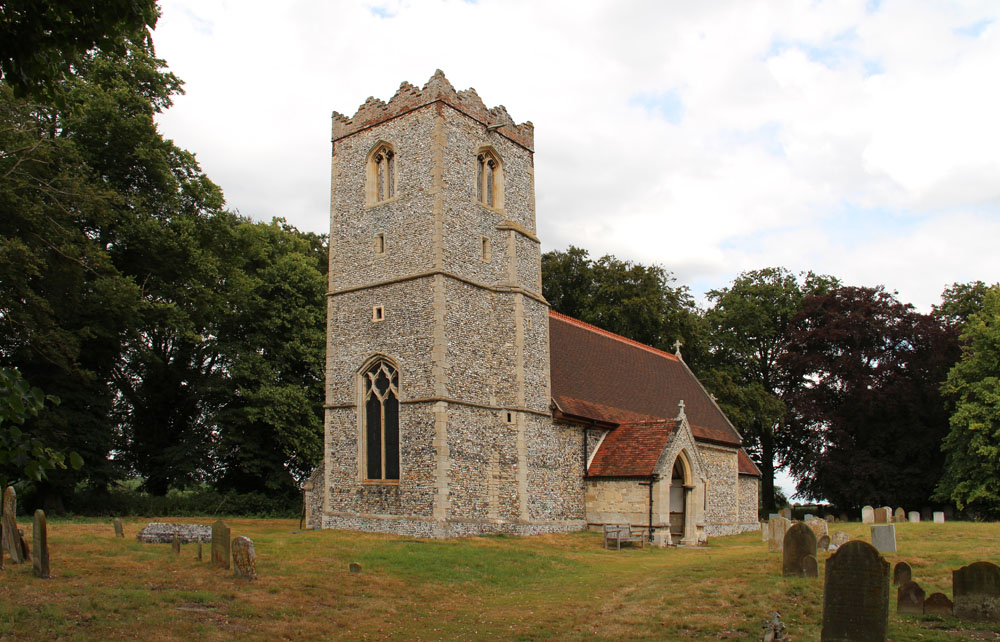
- St Lawrence's church

- Location within Suffolk
- Population: 270 (2005); 255 (2011)
- District: West Suffolk
- Shire county: Suffolk
- Region: East
- Country: England
- Sovereign state: United Kingdom
- Post town: Bury St Edmunds
- Postcode district: IP28
- Police: Suffolk
- Fire: Suffolk
- Ambulance: East of England
- UK Parliament: West Suffolk

Lackford is a village and civil parish in the West Suffolk district of Suffolk in eastern England. Located around four miles north-west of Bury St Edmunds on the A1101, in 2005 it had a population of 270.

The parish contains the Lackford Lakes nature reserve and SSSI, created from reclaimed gravel pits. The Black Ditches run to the west of the parish and mark the parish boundary with Cavenham in places. These are believed to be the most easterly of a series of early Anglo-Saxon defensive earthworks built across the Icknield Way.

Lackford Hall is believed to have been built around 1570 by the fourth son of the squire of West Stow Hall. The hall is a three-chimneyed timber-framed medieval hall house, containing church and abbey stone reclaimed following the Dissolution of the Monasteries by Henry VIII. The Hall is believed by local historians to have been a hunting and fishing lodge. Lackford Lakes Barns are an adjacent quadrangle of barns built from local timber and flint around 1839, based upon engravings in the windows.

The medieval St Lawrence's church is a grade II* listed building.
