= Devil's Dyke, Cambridgeshire =

Cross dyke in England

Coordinates: 52.232°N 0.359°E

Devil's Dyke
- Site of Special Scientific Interest
- Location of Devil's Dyke.
- Area of search: Cambridgeshire
- Grid reference: TL 612 619
- Interest: Biological
- Area: 98 acres (39.8 hectares)
- Notification date: 1984
- Location map: Magic Map

Devil's Dyke or Devil's Ditch is a linear earthen barrier, thought to be of Anglo-Saxon origin, in eastern Cambridgeshire and Suffolk. It runs for 11 kilometres (6.8 mi) in an almost straight line from Reach to Woodditton, with a 10-metre-high (33 ft) ditch and bank system facing southwestwards, blocking the open chalkland between the marshy fens to the north and the formerly wooded hills to the south. It is a Scheduled Monument, a biological Site of Special Scientific Interest and a Special Area of Conservation.

== Description ==
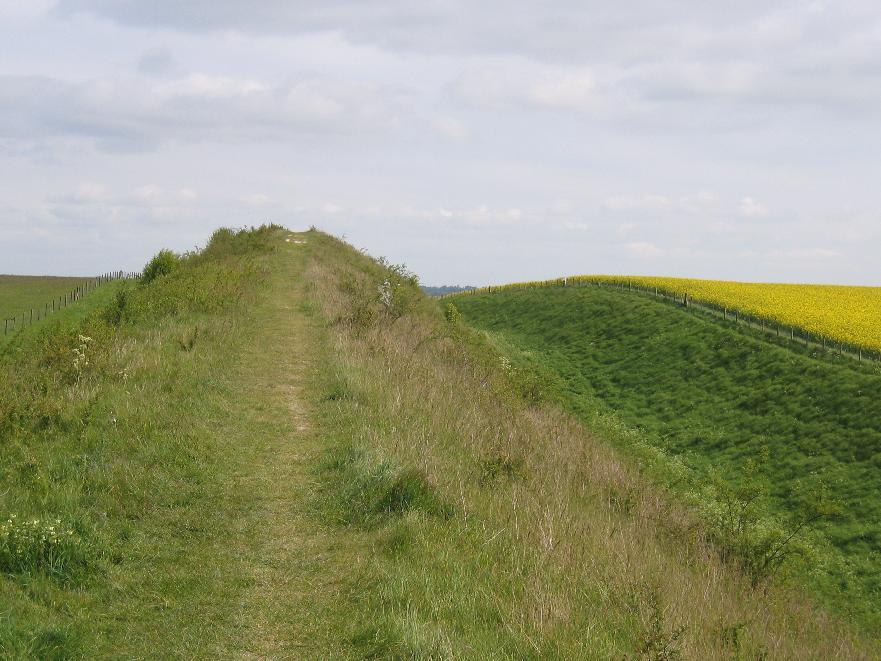
Devil's Dyke near Gallow's Hill, near Burwell

The name Devil's Ditch or Dyke is a post-medieval one. In medieval times it was simply called the dic ("the ditch"), or le Micheldyche or magnum fossatum ("great ditch").

Devil's Dyke is over 7 miles (11 km) long and is the largest of a series of ancient dykes in Cambridgeshire. In some places the bank measures 9 metres (30 ft) high and 36.5 metres (120 ft) across. The highest point along the Devil's Dyke is at Gallows Hill, where it measures 10.5 metres (34 ft) from the bottom of the ditch to the top of the earth wall.

Since the 19th century, a railway line and roads have been cut through the dyke, including the combined A14 and A11 roads, and a branch line of the Ipswich to Ely rail line.

From Reach, the dyke crosses farmland, before running along the edge of the July Course at Newmarket Racecourse and then through the woods of a private estate near the village of Woodditton. The Rowley Mile course is unusual in that it can have races which start in one county, Cambridgeshire, and finish in another, Suffolk. It crosses the Devil's Dyke where it has been previously levelled.

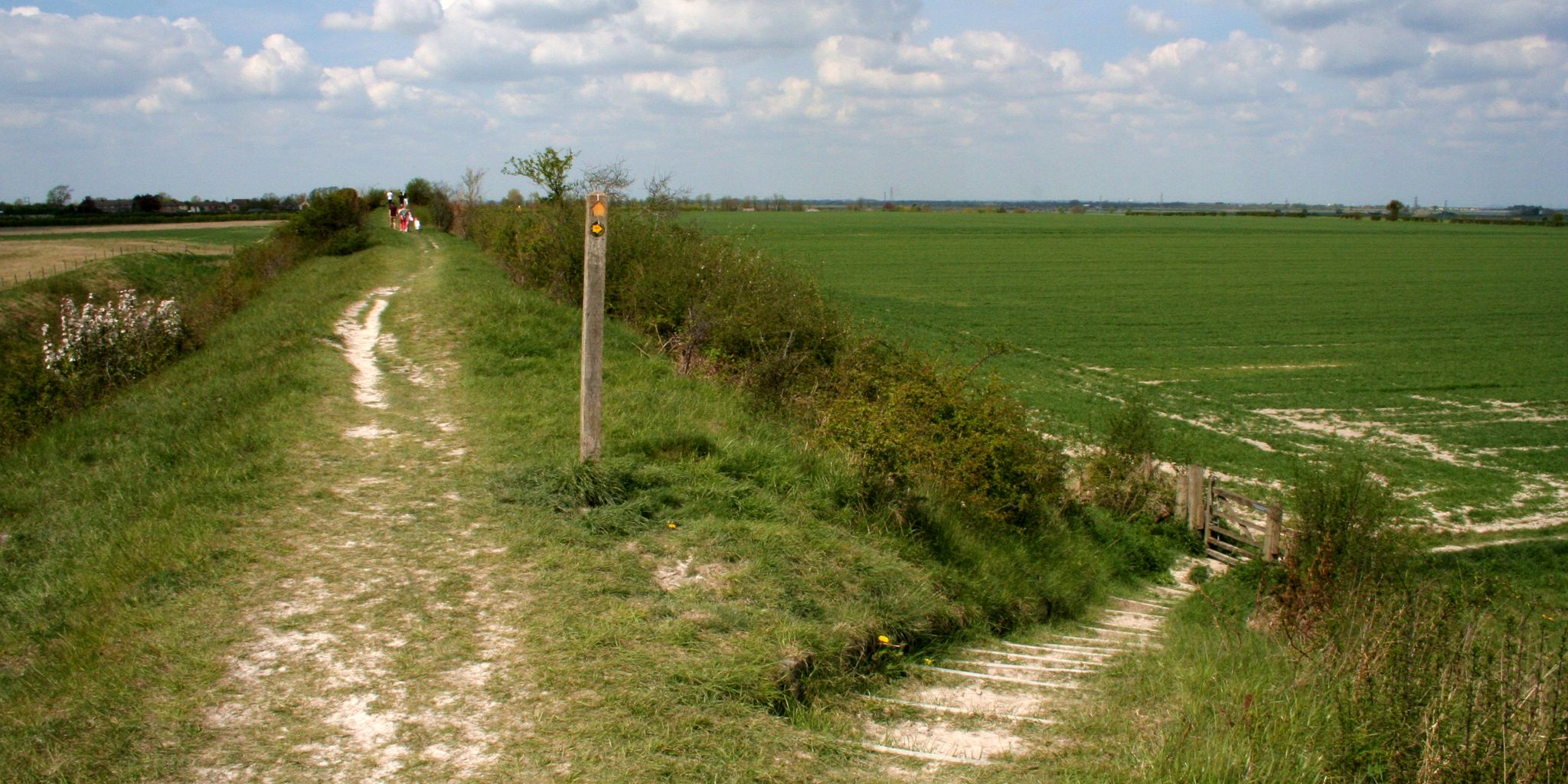
The dyke just south east of Reach

== History ==
There have been a number of excavations and investigations of the dyke in modern times, notably in 1923, 1988 and 1991. Excavations in 1923/24 of a stretch of dyke close to a Roman house yielded Roman artefacts under the dyke, indicating a post-Roman construction date. The results of a 1988 electrical resistance survey of the point where the ancient Street Way cuts through the dyke were inconclusive. In 1991, little was found when a small part of the dyke (measuring 8 × 3 metres (26.2 × 9.8 ft)) was excavated prior to the construction of a new aqueduct. The Dyke is thought most likely to be Anglo-Saxon, by analogy to the similar Fleam Dyke for which radiocarbon dating was performed in the 1990s, with Fleam Dyke's earliest construction phase dated within the uncertainty range of AD 330 – 510. The site is a Scheduled Monument.

=== Early commentators ===
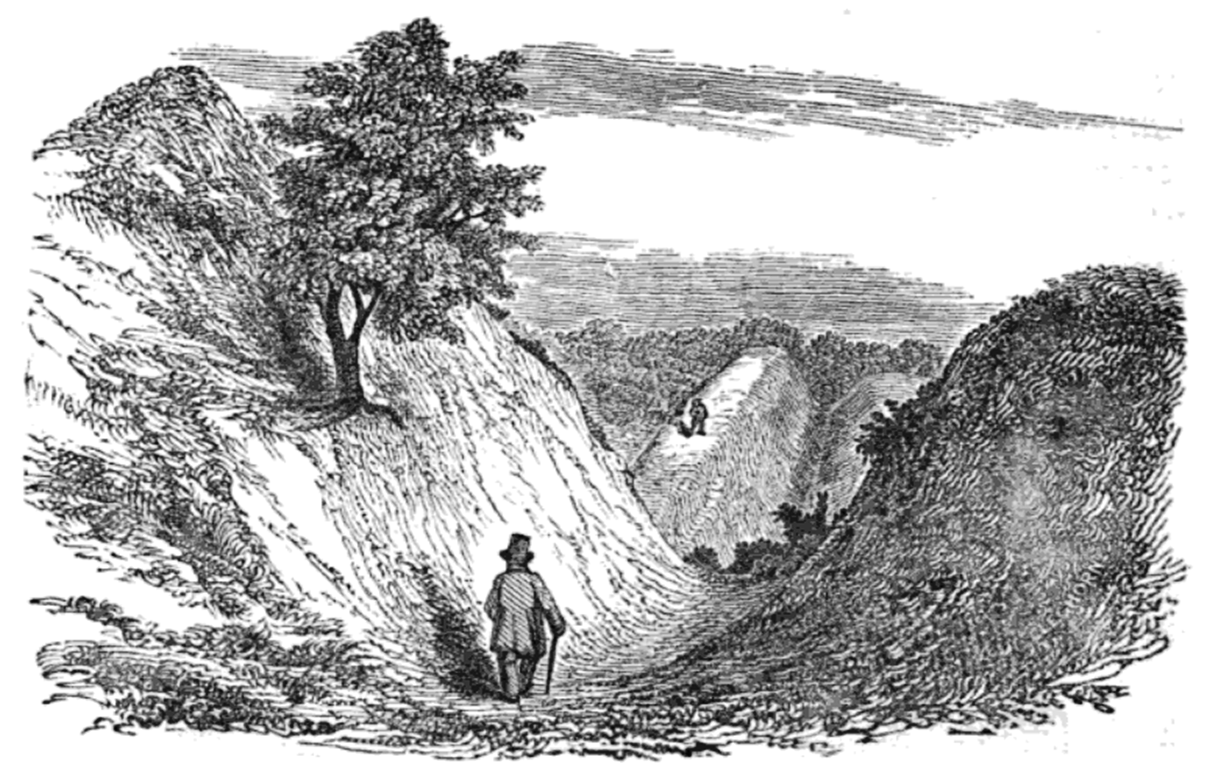
View Looking Towards Woodditton (1853)

The earthwork has been described by various different commentators since Anglo-Saxon times. The Anglo-Saxon Chronicle may refer to the Devil's Dyke in its annal for 905, when Edward the Elder is recorded as fighting and defeating the Danes of East Anglia, after first laying waste to the countryside: 'and he laid waste their land between the Dyke and the Ouse as far northward as the Fens'—' and oferhergade call hera land betwuh dicun and Wusan. call oþ da fennas norð' . Abbo of Fleury, writing in the late 10th century, described East Anglia as "fortified in the front with a bank or rampier like unto a huge wall, and with a trench or ditch below in the ground". The mediaeval Flores Historiarum, referred to "...duo fossata sancti Eadmundi..." – the two fortifications of St Edmund – when describing the battle between Edward and his adversaries.

== Context ==
The profiles of the Cambridgeshire dykes, (based on Hartshorne's Salopia Antinqua (1841)

Devil's Dyke is the largest of several earthworks in south Cambridgeshire that were either boundary markers or designed to control movement along the ancient trackways of Street Way (Ashwell Street) and Icknield Way. When it was created, it completely blocked a narrow land corridor between the southern edge of a region of water-logged marsh (now known as The Fens) in the north-west and dense woodlands in the south, so making circumvention difficult and forming an effective defensive barrier for the lands to the east. The dyke may have served as a way of controlling trade and movement in and out of the area. Findings such as the small quantity of silt in the ditch fills suggest that the dyke fell into disuse soon after it was built.

The other Cambridgeshire dykes include Fleam Dyke, Brent Ditch and Bran Ditch. In Suffolk, to the north west of Bury St Edmunds, a fifth earthwork, Black Ditches, Cavenham, guards the Icknield Way.

== Ecology ==
The site has extensive chalk grassland with diverse species, and areas of woodland and chalk scrub. Rare plants, such as purple milk-vetch, bastard toadflax and pasque flowers, have been recorded. The site is a 98-acre (39.8 hectare) biological Site of Special Scientific Interest and a Special Area of Conservation.

== In popular culture ==
The American–British author Bill Bryson describes a walk along Devil's Dyke in Notes From a Small Island (1995), describing the dyke to be only 1300 years old, which was the scholarly consensus prior to radiocarbon dating of the similar Fleam Dyke, published in 1997.

== Sources ==
- Babington, Cardale (1883). Ancient Cambridgeshire: or an Attempt to Trace Roman and Other Ancient Roads That Passed Through the County of Cambridge. Cambridge: Cambridge University Press.
- "Cambridgeshire Historic Environment Record 07801 (Devil's Ditch/Dyke, Reach to Woodditton)". Heritage Gateway. 2006.
- Earle, John (1865). Two of the Saxon Chronicles Parallel (in Old English and English). Oxford: Clarendon Press. "Earle, John (1865). Two of the Saxon Chronicles Parallel"
- Fox, C. (1923). The Archaeology of the Cambridge Region: a topographical study of the Bronze, Early Iron, Roman and Anglo-Saxon Ages, with an introductory note on the Neolithic Age. Cambridge: Cambridge University Press. OCLC 889947651.
- Tymms, Samuel (1853). "The Devil's Dyke, Newmarket". Proceedings of the Bury and West Suffolk Archaeological Institute. 1. Bury St. Edmunds.
