= Hertfordshire Border Walk =

171-mile footpath in Hertfordshire, England

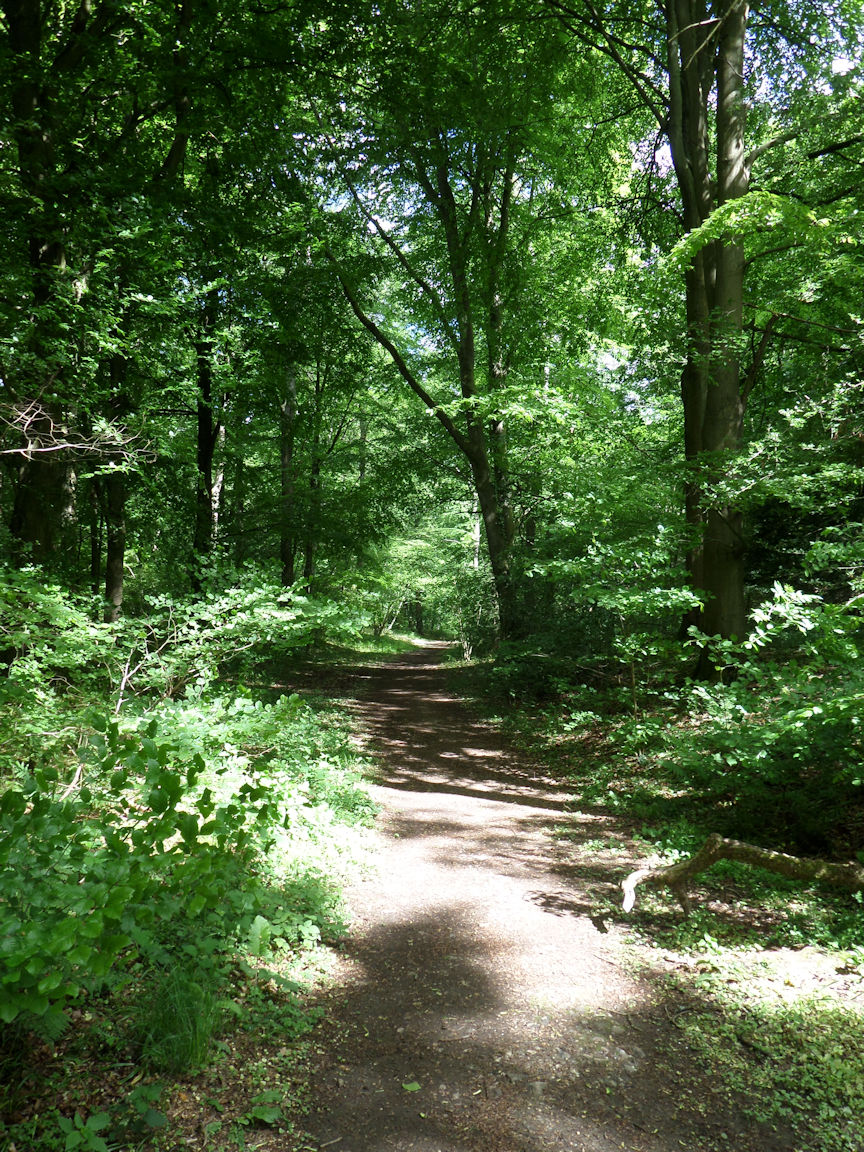
- The Hertfordshire Border Walk in Hockeridge Bottom, by Berkhamsted
- Length: 171 mi (275 km)
- Location: Hertfordshire, England
- Trailheads: Chorleywood
- Use: Hiking
- Highest point: 800 feet (Pavis Wood)
- Difficulty: Moderate

The Hertfordshire Border Walk is long-distance walking route around the border of Hertfordshire, following the traditional county border. It keeps close to the border as far as practical, often running along it. It was developed as a walking route in celebration of the county for the Association of British Counties.

The route is a circular route with a starting and finishing point at Chorleywood Station. It is 171 miles long (currently longer due to a diversion for the HS2 works). It was first walked in 2018 over the course of nine days.

The walk is not currently waymarked. It incorporates sections of a number of waymarked routes, including the Chiltern Way, Hertfordshire Way, Icknield Way Trail and Hertfordshire Chain Walk, along with many local paths.

== Gallery ==
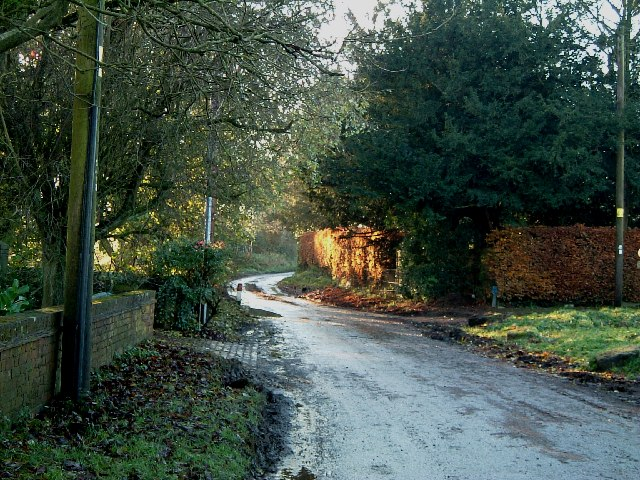
Hastoe

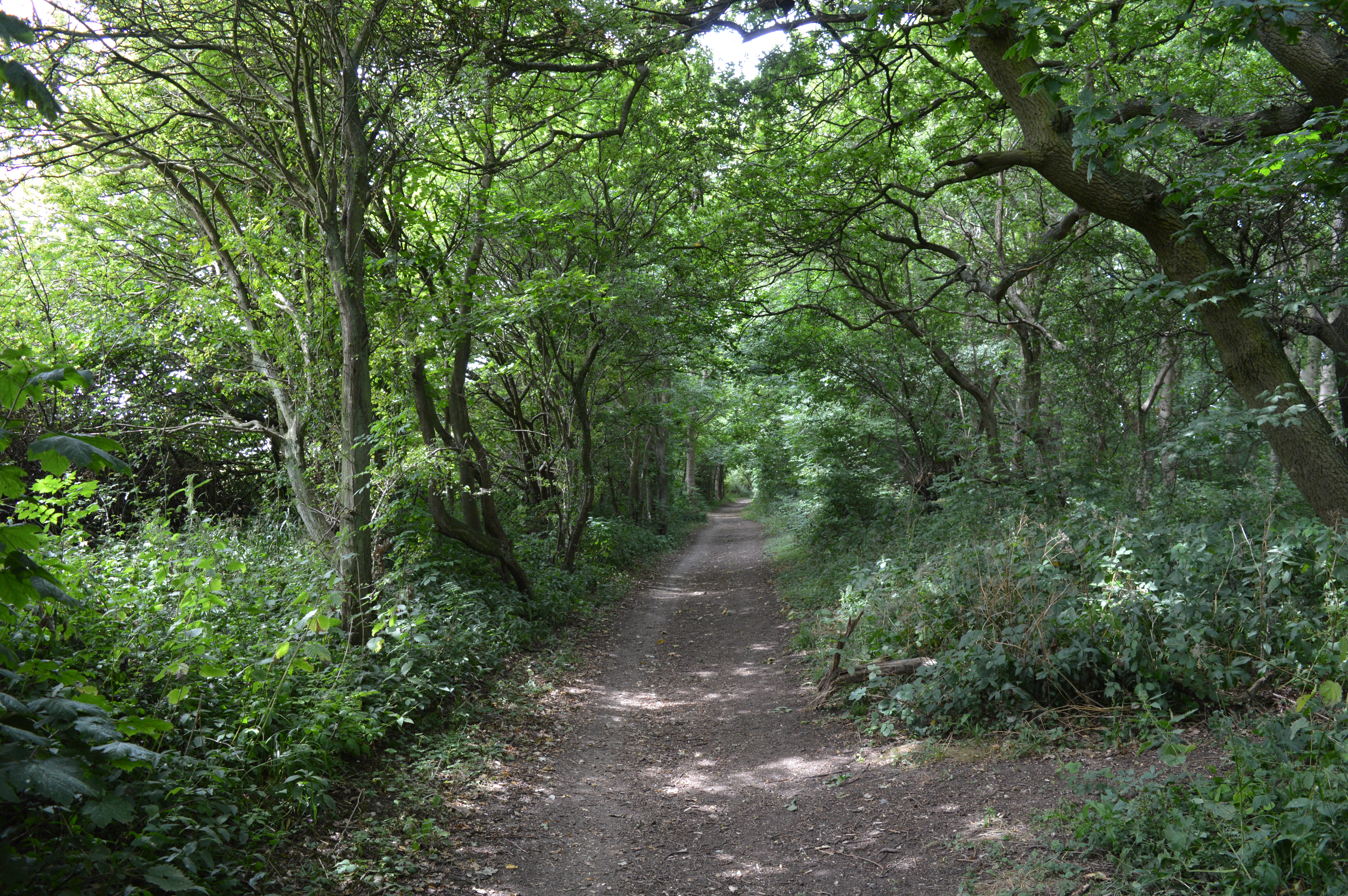
On Telegraph Hill, near Lilley

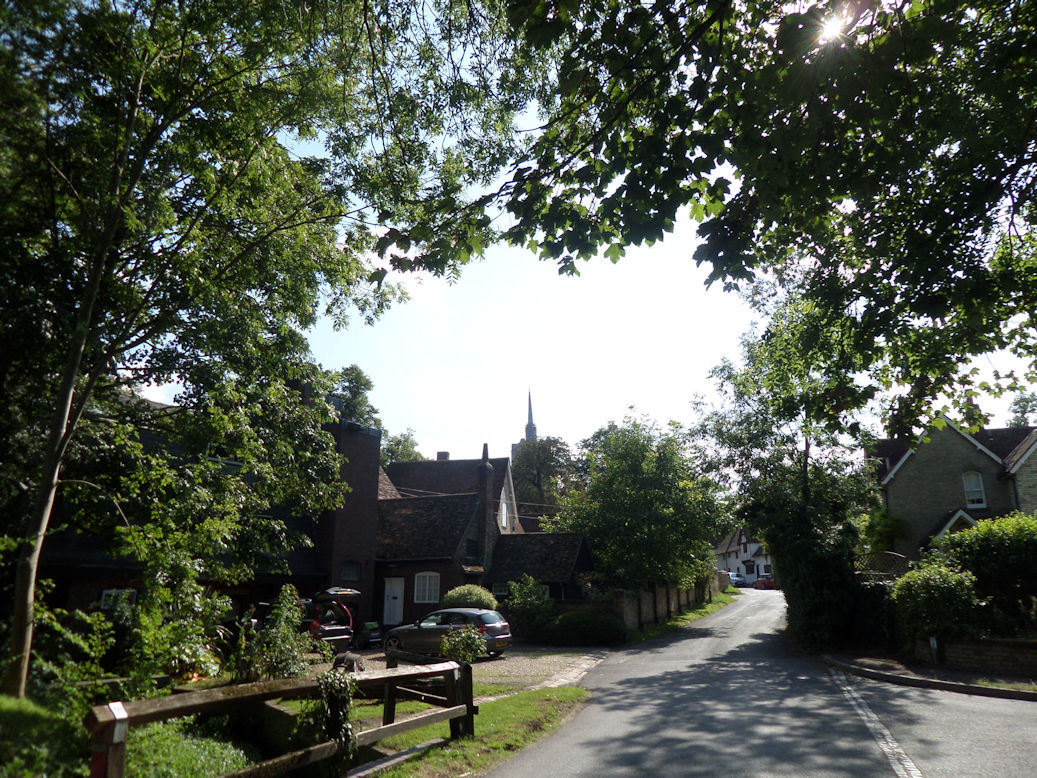
Entering Ashwell

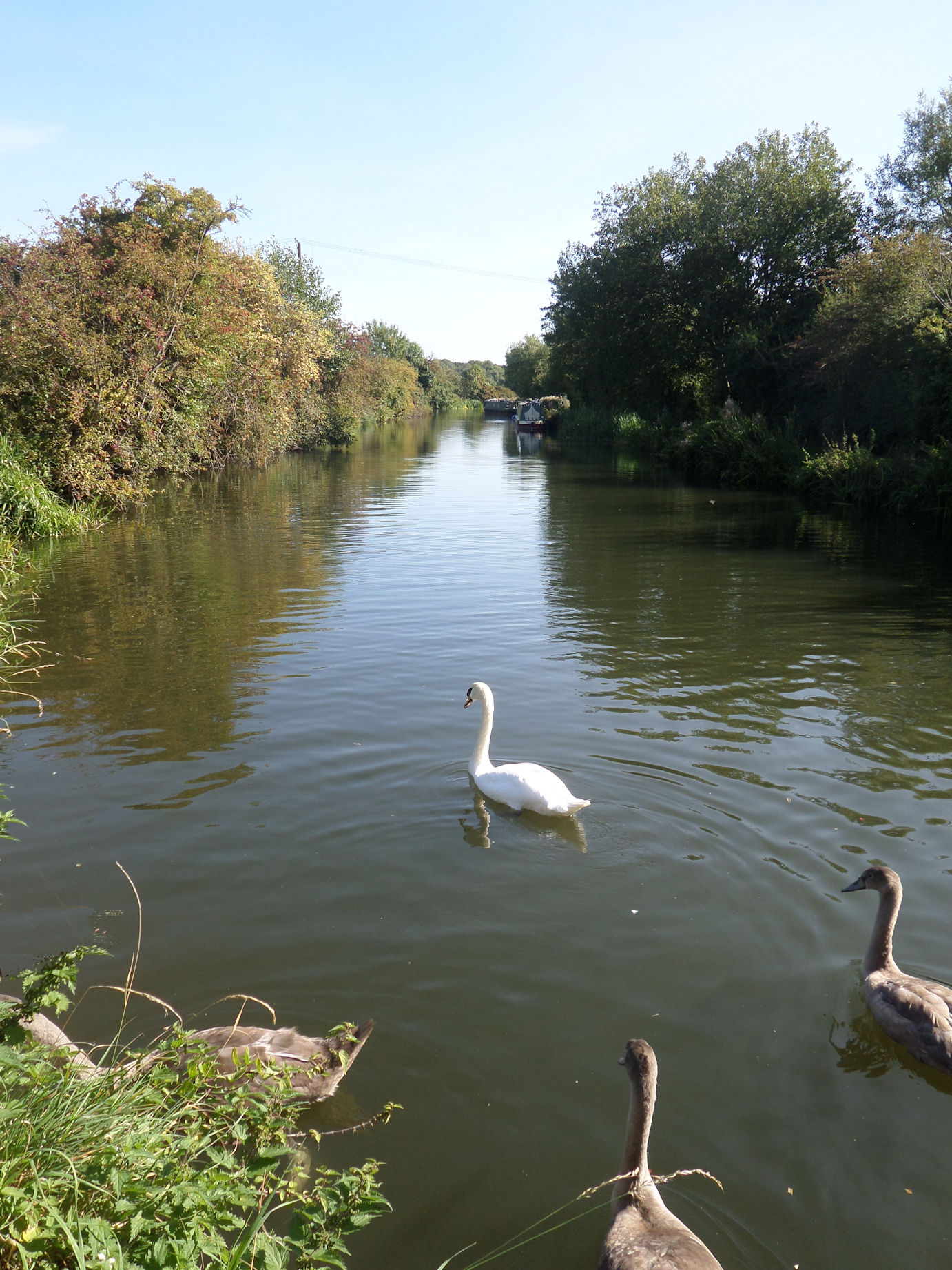
By the River Stort
