= Fowlmere =

Village in Cambridgeshire, England

Coordinates: 52.08°N 0.08°E

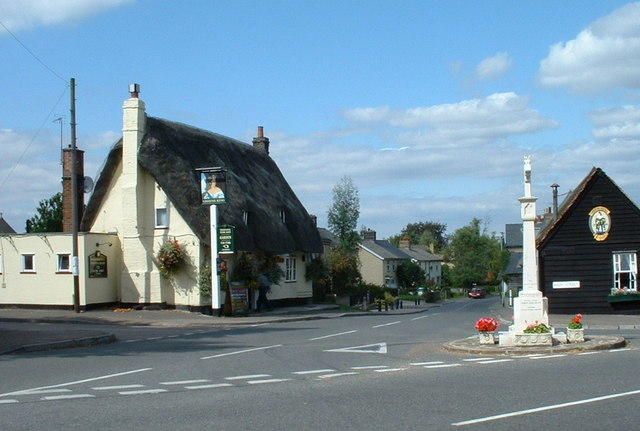
- Pubs and war memorial in the centre of Fowlmere

- Location within Cambridgeshire
- Population: 1,206 (2011)
- OS grid reference: TL427448
- Shire county: Cambridgeshire
- Region: East
- Country: England
- Sovereign state: United Kingdom
- Post town: Royston
- Postcode district: SG8

Fowlmere is one of the southernmost villages in Cambridgeshire, England. The population of the civil parish at the 2011 Census was 1,206. It is very close to the Imperial War Museum Duxford, and 9 miles (14 km) southwest of the city of Cambridge.

== History ==
The village has an ancient landmark called the ‘Round Moat’, which is the remains of an early Saxon settlement dating from around the ninth century.

Fowlmere is a parish, 6 miles (9.7 km) north-east from Royston, 2 1/2 miles (4.0 km) south-east from the Shepreth station on the Hitchin, Royston and Cambridge line of the London and North Eastern railway, and 9 miles (14 km) south from Cambridge, in the hundred of Thriplow, petty sessional division of Arrington and Melbourn, union and county court district of Royston, rural deanery of Barton, archdeaconry and diocese of Ely. The cemetery, on the Shepreth road, comprises 1-acre (4,000 m^{2}) of ground, given by the late F. M. Beldam-Johns esq. and has a chapel, erected in 1912; it is under the control of the Parish Council.

— Kelly's Directory - Cambridgeshire - 1929

The Census Records from 1841 to 1891 can be found in the Cambridge Record Office.

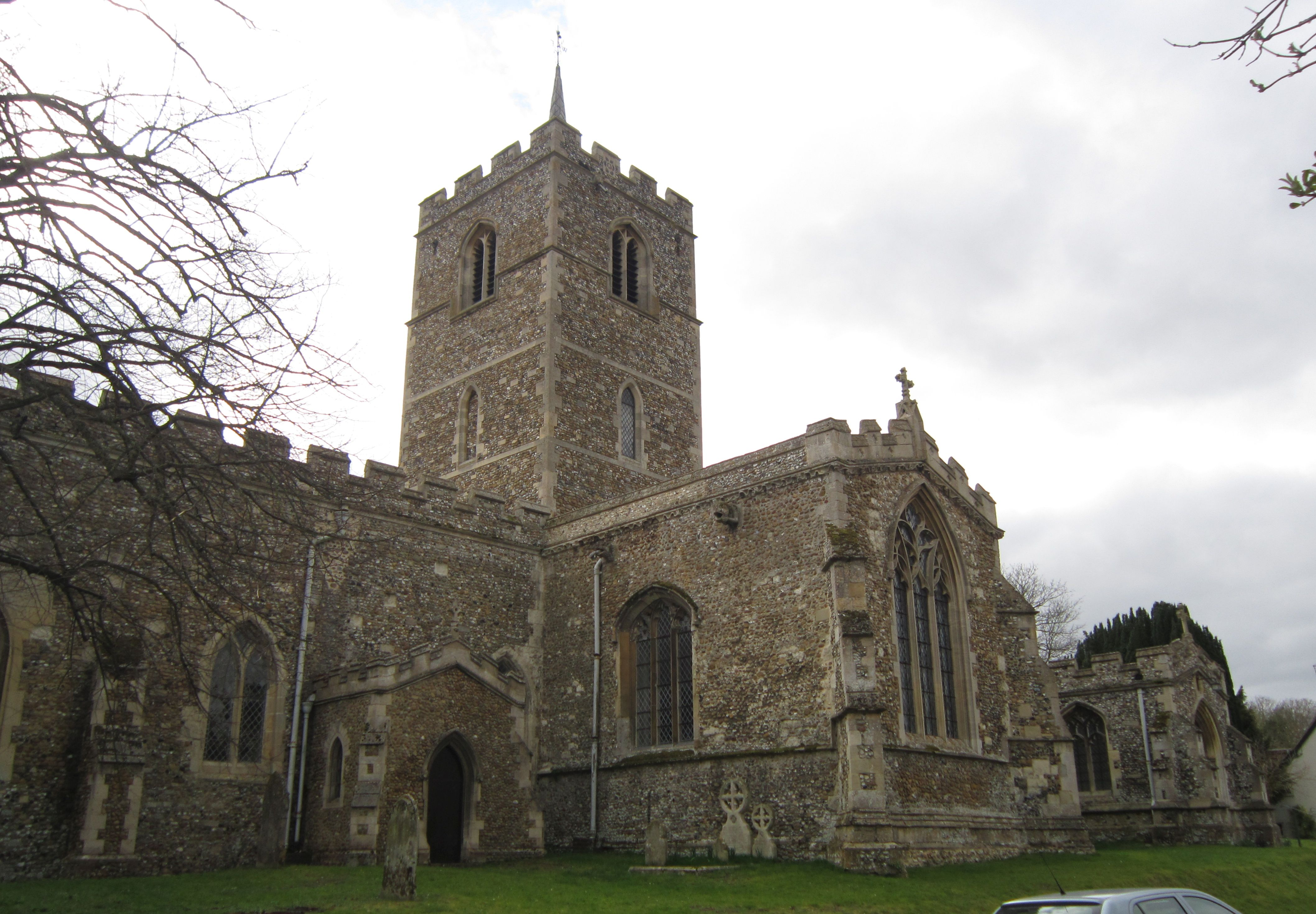
Church of St. Mary

The church of St. Mary is a fine structure of flint in the Early English, Decorated and Perpendicular styles, consisting of chancel, nave, aisle, transepts, north porch and a lofty embattled central tower containing 5 bells; there are two memorial windows, and there is also a monument to the Mitchell family, dated 1745 and 1748: the church was restored during the period 1870-90, at a cost of about £3,000, and has 250 sittings. The register dates from the year 1561. The Congregational chapel was erected in 1780: in 1870 an apse was added and an organ purchased: the chapel underwent a thorough restoration in 1878, at a cost of about £1,100, this sum including the erection of a turret containing a clock and bell: there are 409 sittings. In the village is a cross of Portland stone, erected in 1919 as a memorial to the men of the parish who fell in the Great War, 1914-18.

— Kelly's Directory - Cambridgeshire - 1929

The village was struck by an F1/T2 tornado on 23 November 1981, as part of the record-breaking nationwide tornado outbreak on that day.

== Village life ==
Fowlmere has one pub, The Chequers, which has operated since the 16th Century. It served as a coaching inn for travellers going into and from Cambridge and was even used as coffin storage for those travelling with bodies. It was notably mentioned in the writings of Samuel Pepys, which is regarded as an important historical English diary. Nowadays, the pub serves as a local bar and restaurant that takes in patrons from many nearby villages.

== School ==
Fowlmere has one school, Fowlmere Primary School, which educates around 100 students a year. It is an extension of an old school building that has been used since its founding in 1861. It teaches pupils aged 4–11 (years reception to 6) and attracts pupils from Fowlmere, Thriplow and nearby Great Chishill, which does not have a Primary school of its own. The site lies opposite 'The Butts' which is a field and neighbourhood at the edge of the village. The school forms a large part of the community, as most of the children in the small village grow up around it.

== Airfield ==
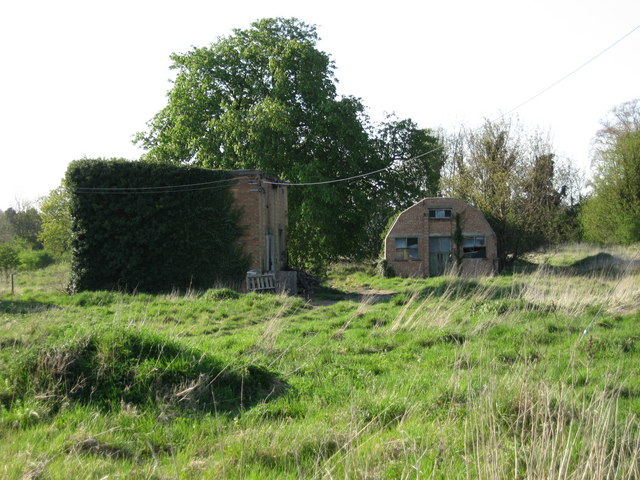
Derelict buildings on the site of the former RAF airfield

Fowlmere Airfield opened in late-1916 as an emergency landing ground for 75 (Home Defence) Squadron of the Royal Flying Corps, who had their HQ in Bedford and dispersed their three flights to Yelling (St Neots), Old Weston (Thrapston) and Therfield (Baldock) on anti-Zeppelin duties. Its purpose was to receive aircraft lost, out of fuel or with engine troubles and was staffed with a minimum number of personnel whose prime task was to light flares to aid pilots in finding the site. It closed down after WW1.

As RAF Fowlmere, near the edge of the village, it was the location for the RAF Station and transferred to the United States Army Air Force (USAAF) for use by their 339th Fighter Group during World War II. The Group flew its first combat mission on 30 April 1944, and its last on 21 April 1945.

The airfield now provides pilots with self-fly Piper aircraft and servicing, as well as PPL training.

== Natural history ==
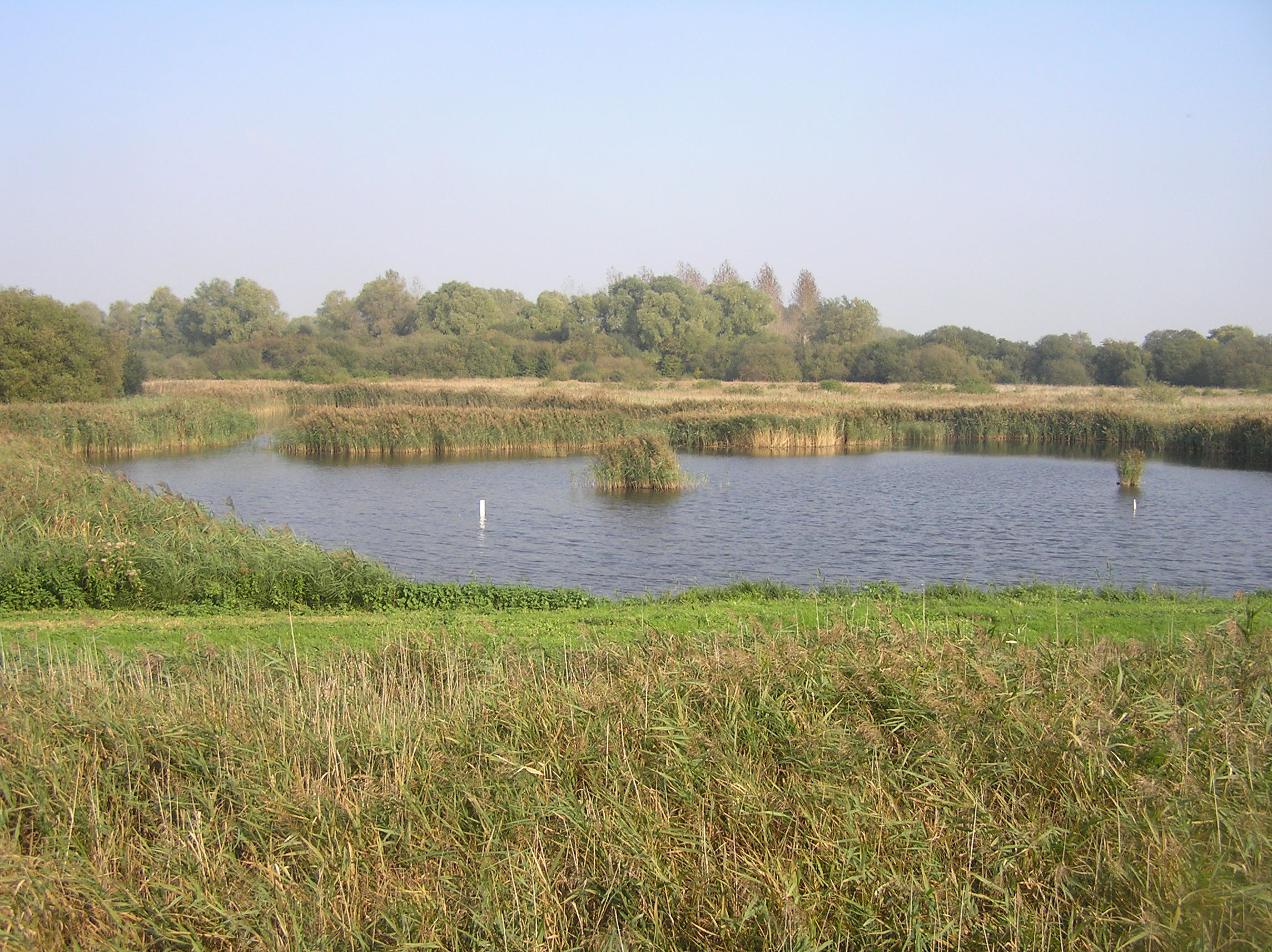
Fowlmere nature reserve

The Fowlmere nature reserve (maintained by the RSPB) is situated west of the village, between it and the village of Melbourn. With 2.4 kilometres (1 mi) of nature trails, it attracts many visitors. Several special birds are seen there, including: kingfishers, water rails, and grasshopper warblers.

Fowlmere, along with several other Cambridgeshire villages, lays claim to a sighting of the infamous Fen Tiger, a supposed wild big cat.
