= Melbourn Science Park =

Science park in Melbourn, Cambridgeshire, England

Coordinates: 52.0873°N 0.0247°E

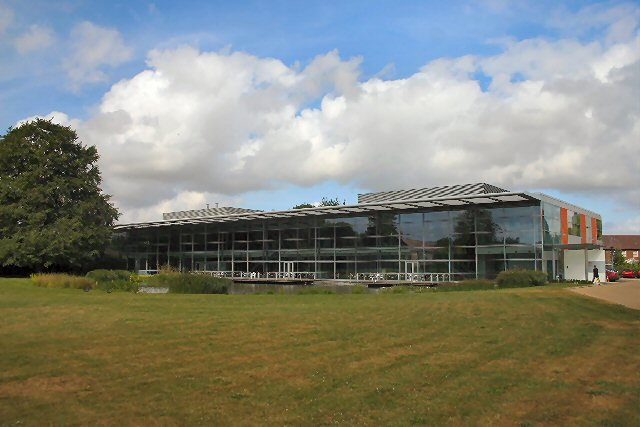
Melbourn Science Park

Melbourn Science Park is a science park located in the village of Melbourn, England, 9 miles (14 km) south of Cambridge. It is owned by Bruntwood SciTech.

Melbourn Science Park covers 17 acres (69,000 m^{2}) with nine buildings covering over 200,000 sq ft (19,000 m^{2}).
