= Brent Ditch =

Ancient monument in South Cambridgeshire, England

Coordinates: 52.1058°N 0.2089°E

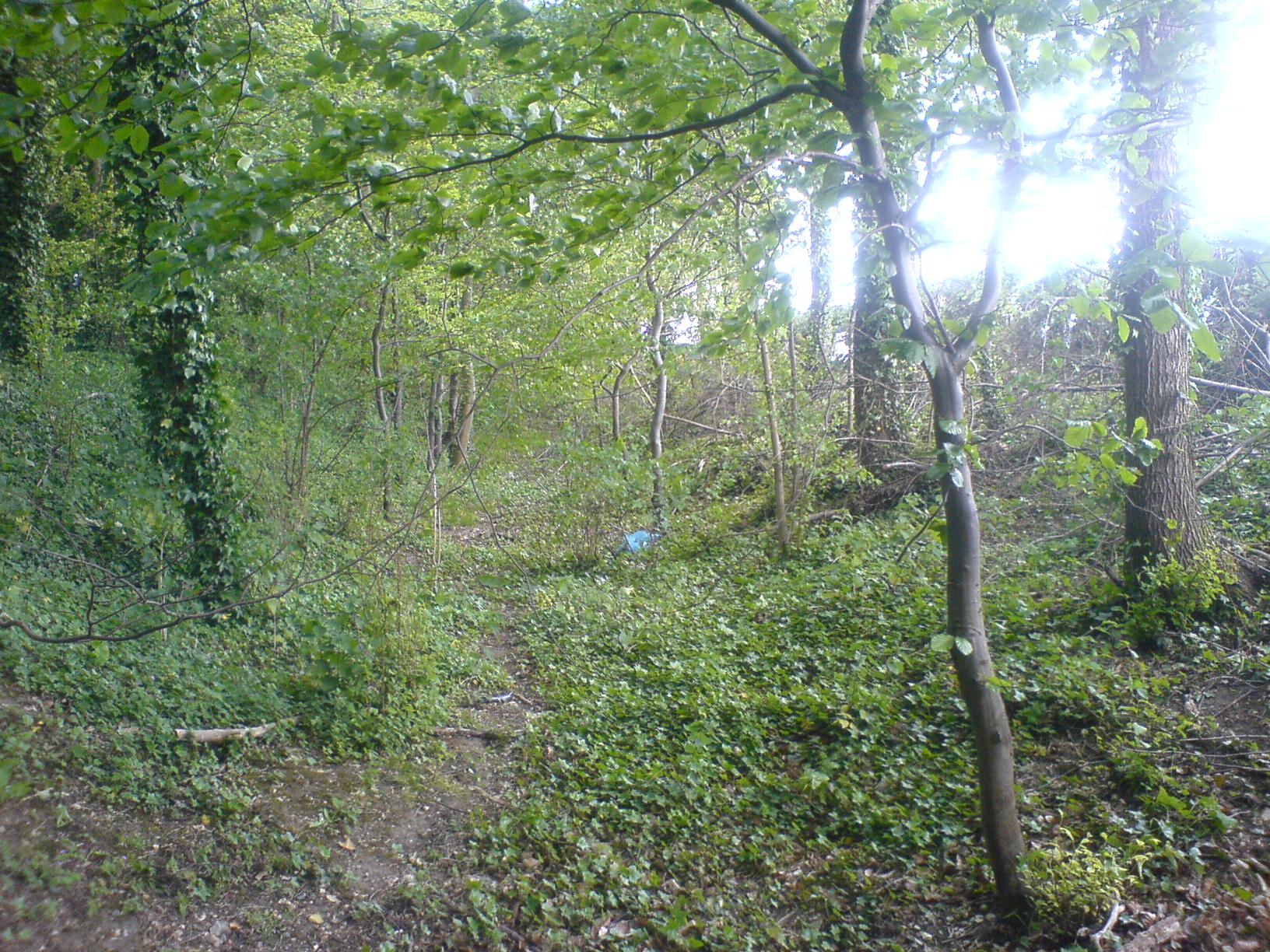
Brent Ditch as seen from A11 slip road on southern side.

Brent Ditch is generally assumed to be an Anglo-Saxon earthwork in Southern Cambridgeshire, England, built around the 6th and 7th centuries AD. However most of its structure has been lost over time. The site is scheduled as an ancient monument by Historic England.

2 km (~1mile) in length it runs from Pampisford Hall in the North-West to Abington in the South-East. For most of its length it is wooded and it is on private land and so difficult to access. It was built as a defensive structure to control the flow of trade along ancient routes.

In modern times it is bisected by the routes of the old and new A11. It is from the old single carriageway road (grid reference TL514474) that the structure is best viewed as a low ditch in a wooded area beside the road. The earth works at this point are 2 to 3 m high.

The dyke is one of the smaller earthworks of several in south Cambridgeshire designed to control movement along the ancient Roman roads. The others are Devil's Dyke, Fleam Dyke and Bran Ditch.

Black Ditches, Cavenham is a fifth earthwork guarding the ancient Icknield Way and can be found in Suffolk north west of Bury St Edmunds
