= Lackford Lakes =

Nature reserve in Suffolk, England

Coordinates: 52.3°N 0.64°E

- Site of Special Scientific Interest
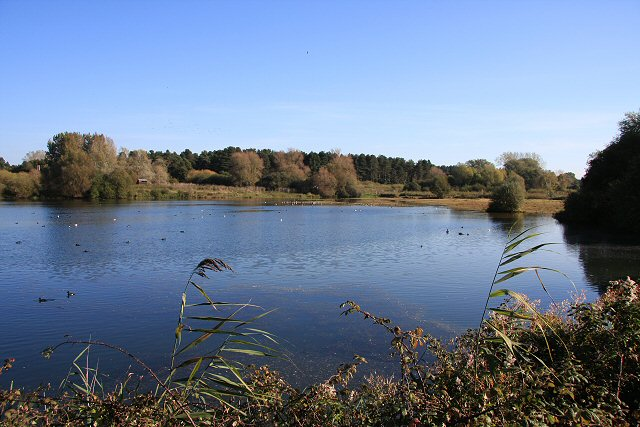
- Location of Lackford Lakes.
- Area of search: Suffolk
- Grid reference: TL 803 707
- Interest: Biological
- Area: 105.8 hectares
- Notification date: 1987
- Location map: Magic Map

Lackford Lakes is a 105.8-hectare (261-acre) biological Site of Special Scientific Interest (SSSI) north and east of Lackford in Suffolk. The SSSI is part of the 131-hectare (320-acre) Lackford Lakes nature reserve, which is managed by the Suffolk Wildlife Trust.

The lakes are disused sand and gravel pits in the valley of the River Lark. There are diverse dragonfly species, and many breeding and overwintering birds, including nationally important numbers of gadwalls and shovelers. Skylarks breed on dry grassland, and lapwings in marshy meadows.

There is access from the A1101 road.
