= Fowlmere RSPB reserve =

RSPB nature reserve in Cambridgeshire, England

Coordinates: 52.08910°N 0.05076°E

Fowlmere Watercress Beds
- Site of Special Scientific Interest
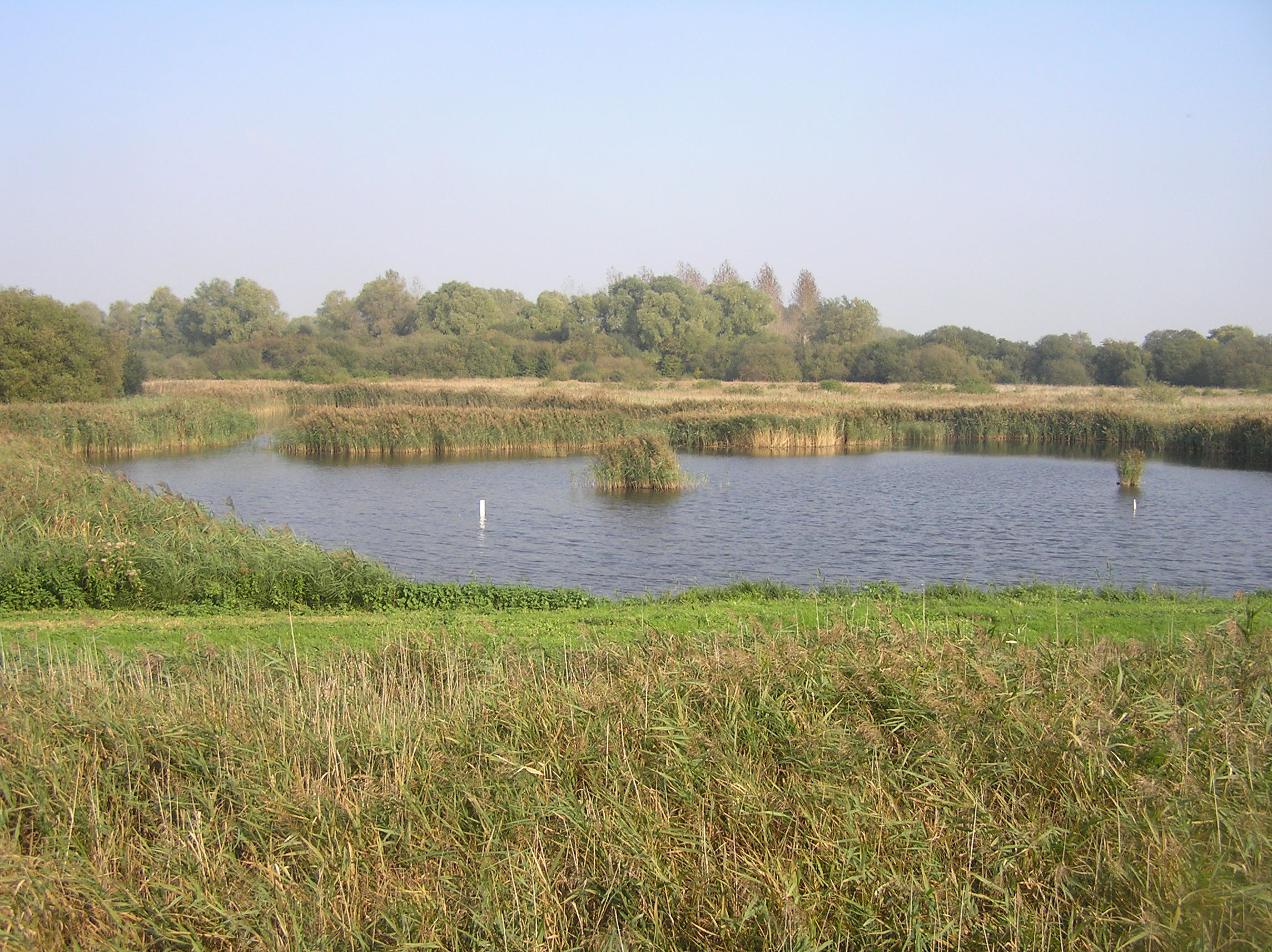
- Fowlmere from the Reedbed Hide
- Location of Fowlmere Watercress Beds.
- Area of search: Cambridgeshire
- Grid reference: TL 406 454
- Interest: Biological
- Area: 39.9 hectares
- Notification date: 1982
- Location map: Magic Map

Fowlmere is a Royal Society for the Protection of Birds nature reserve between Fowlmere and Melbourn in Cambridgeshire. It is designated a 39.9-hectare (99-acre) biological Site of Special Scientific Interest called Fowlmere Watercress Beds.

Fowlmere's reedbeds and pools are fed by natural chalk springs and a chalk stream runs through the reserve. It has three hides, two of which are wheelchair-accessible. Special birds include kingfishers, water rails, sedge warblers, reed warblers and grasshopper warblers plus a roost of corn buntings in winter.

== History of Fowlmere Nature Reserve ==
The reserve was bought by the RSPB in 1977 using money raised in a sponsored birdwatch by the RSPB's junior branch. The name Fowlmere comes from the nature of the site before 1800 when it was an area of open water which was a habitat for large numbers of wildfowl. In 1850 attempts were made to drain the area but failed. In the 1890s watercress began to be grown and ponds were dug and lined with clay. The watercress growers gained more control over the water levels by driving pipes into the ground from which the water bubbled to the surface and still flow when the water table is high enough. However, due to extraction of water for people in surrounding areas, the water flowing out of the spring is decreased over its 19th-century levels, and during dry periods the Environment Agency provides extra water. The watercress was washed and packed on site before being taken by horse and cart to Shepreth station and thence to Covent Garden Market in London. Watercress growing continued until the 1960s. The abandoned cress beds became overgrown with reeds and the site is now managed to preserve a wide variety of habitats.

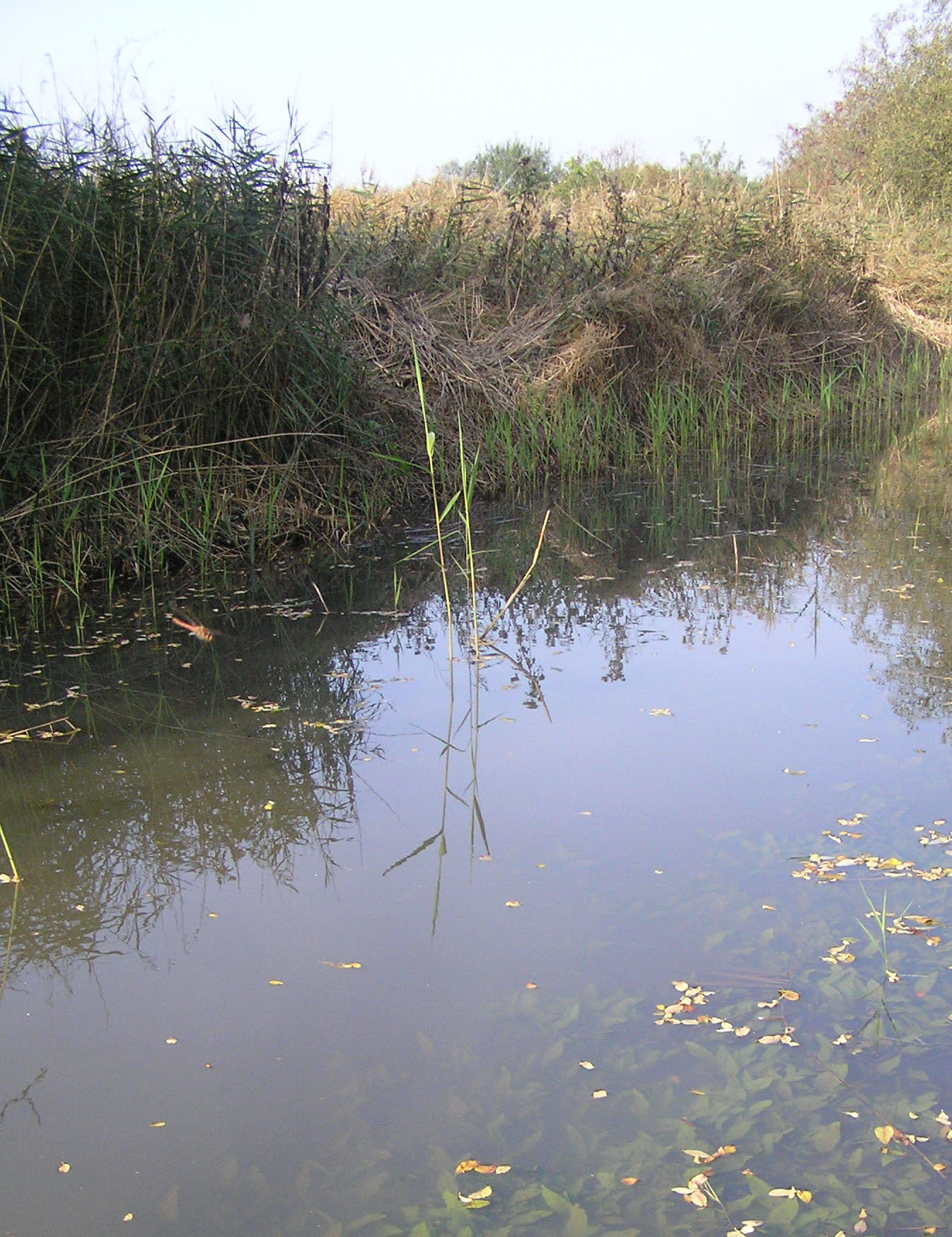
Picture of Fowlmere from nature trail

== More details of the site ==
The site covers 40 hectares. There is a 3 km nature trail and certain sections are wheelchair accessible. Pond dipping can be organised by arrangement with the warden. On sunny days from spring until late autumn adult dragonflies and damselflies can often be seen.

If the reedbeds were not managed, they would eventually dry out. To prevent this, every autumn a small section of reed is cut and the reeds burnt or removed.

Other areas are being managed to restore chalk grassland. One area is grazed by cattle and sheep, which is helping to bring back wildflowers such as cowslips, southern marsh orchids and goatsbeard. Another area is mown in late autumn and the cuttings raked off to prevent the soil from becoming richer and thus allowing stronger plants to take over.

== Access ==
There is access from the road which goes from the cemetery on Shepreth Road to Cambridge Road.

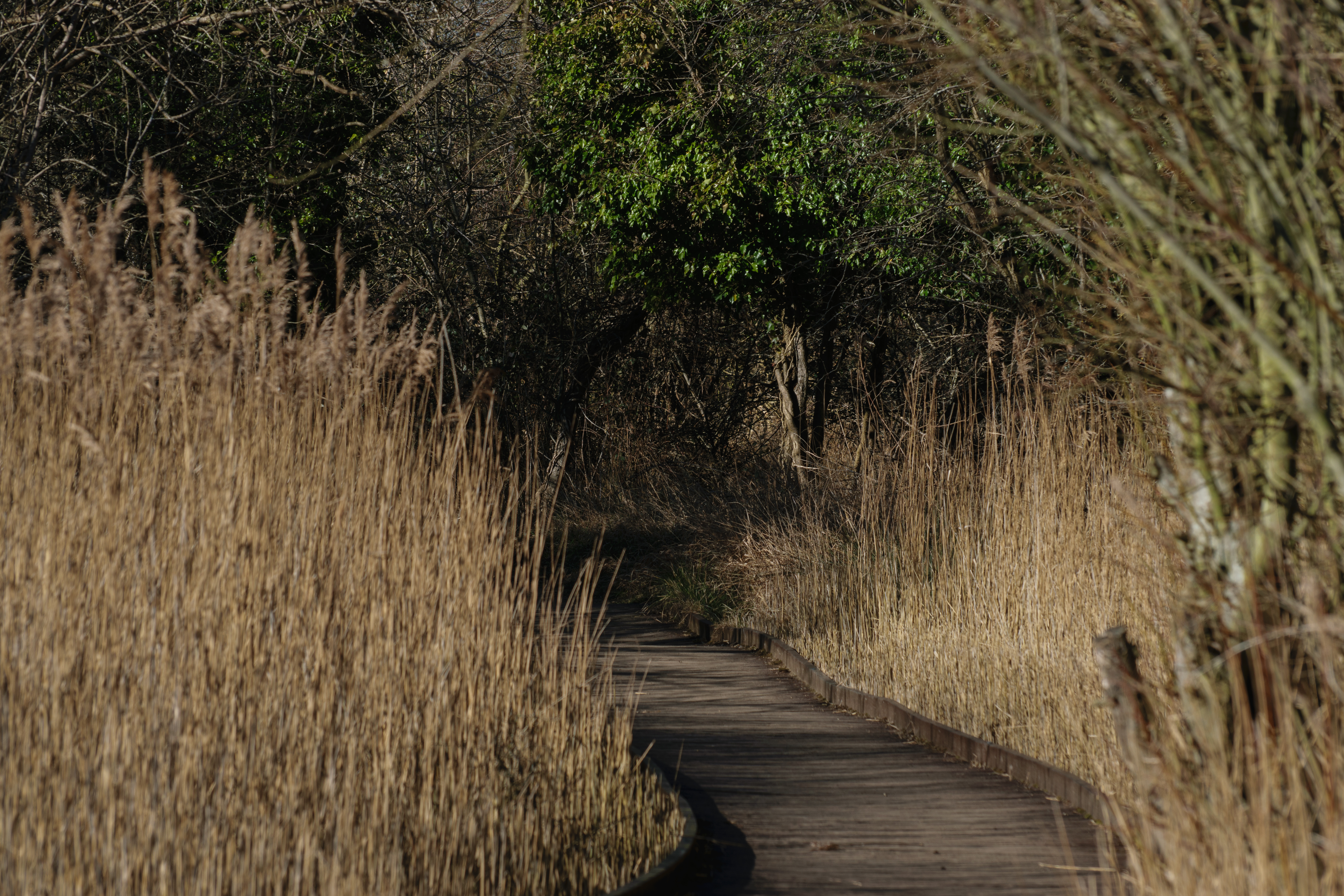
Image of the reeds at RSPB Fowlmere.
