= Flendish Hundred =

Former administrative division of Cambridgeshire, England

Flendish Hundred (more commonly Flendish) was a pre-Norman administrative division of the county of Cambridgeshire, England. It probably got its name from Fleam Dyke. Hundreds were intermediate administrative divisions, larger than villages and smaller than shires, that survived until the 19th century. It was probably created in the early 10th century. Flendish was first recorded in the Domesday Book of 1086. In the 11th century Flendish hundred contained four vills, later divided into five parishes: Fulbourn, Teversham, Hinton, and Horningsea (today, Fen Ditton and Horningsea).

== Alternative Spellings ==
Before English spelling was formalised, the spelling varied considerably showing the Germanic, Norse and Flemish cultural influences of East Anglia before the time when English was declared England's language by Edward III.

[Citation P. H. Reaney, The Place-Names of Cambridgeshire and the Isle of Ely (EPNS 19), Cambridge 1943.]

Flendish Hundred

Flamingdice, Flammindic, Flammidinc, Flammiding 1086 DB

Flammincdic, Flammigedic, Flammicgedic, Flammingedich, Flammedigedig 1086 InqEl

Flamencdic 1086 ICC

Flammedich 1155-7 P

Flamedich(e) 1175-9 P , 1251 ElyCouch , 1277 Ely , 14th Cai

Flaundishe 1553 Pat

Flem(e)dich(e), Flem(e)dych(e) 1188 P et freq to, 1523 SR

Flemesdich 1218 SR , 1284 FA , 1298 Ass

Flemedic 1218 SR

Flemdik(e), Flemdyk(e) 1268, 1285 Ass

Flem(i)sdich 1279 RH

Flemdisch 1372 SR

Flem(e)dys(s)h 1457 IpmR , 1523 SR

Flendiche 1428 FA , 1570 SR

Flendishe, Flendyshe t. Hy 6 Cole xxxvii, 1560 Depositions

Flendick 1570 SR

Flyndiche 1553 Pat

Flyndysshe 1557 Pat
