= Hertfordshire Chain Walk =

Footpaths in Hertfordshire, England

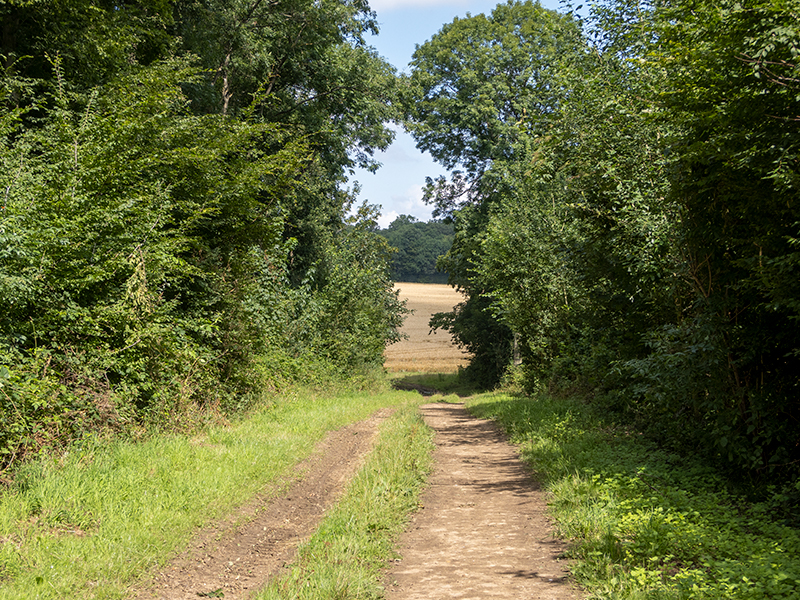
- At Bramfield
- Length: 87 mi (140 km)
- Location: Hertfordshire, England
- Use: Hiking
- Season: All year

The Hertfordshire Chain Walk is located in Hertfordshire, England, and consists of 15 linked circular walks. These walks, each of which is between 4.25 and 9 miles, make up a total distance of 87 miles. The tracks pass through villages in East Hertfordshire close to London, the Icknield Way and the Cambridgeshire border. It also passes close to the Lea Valley Walk and the London Loop.

The Hertfordshire Chain Walk starts in the south of Hertfordshire; the first walk passes through the London Borough of Enfield. Some of its path is shared with the Hertfordshire Way; the chain walk then heads north to Little Berkhamsted and passes west of Hertford. The chain walk then continues northwards between Stevenage (to the west) and Buntingford; it again meets the Hertfordshire Way near Sandon and Therfield, south of Royston. The Chain Walk finishes at Ashwell and Morden railway station across the county boundary in Cambridgeshire.

The walk was devised by the East Herts Footpath Society.
