= Pampisford =

Village in Cambridgeshire, England

Coordinates: 52.12°N 0.18°E

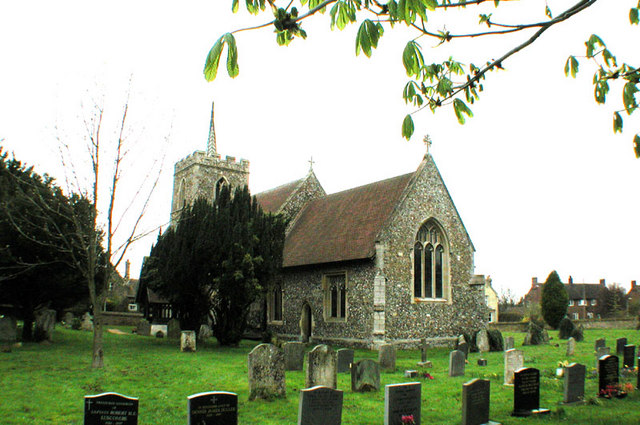
- St John the Baptist

- Location within Cambridgeshire
- Population: 344 (2011)
- OS grid reference: TL494487
- Civil parish: Pampisford
- District: South Cambridgeshire
- Shire county: Cambridgeshire
- Region: East
- Country: England
- Sovereign state: United Kingdom
- Post town: Cambridge
- Postcode district: CB22

Pampisford is a village, south of Cambridge, on the A505 road near Sawston, Cambridgeshire, England.

The remaining section of a defensive ditch, dug to close the gap between forest and marsh, is known as Brent Ditch, which runs between Abington Park and Dickman's Grove, and is most clearly seen in the park of Pampisford Hall.

== Famous local families ==
The Herald's Visitations (1575 and 1619) record an armiger holding an estate here, John Killingworth, who is designated "of Pampisford", although he appears to have resided at another Killingworth estate, West Hall Manor at Mundford, in Norfolk. John had been educated at Queens' College, Cambridge. The Killingworths also held Balsham Place Manor in Cambridgeshire and John purchased Clare Priory in Suffolk from John Frende in 1589, who had it at the dissolution. It appears that the Killingworths were feudal tenants of the manor at Pampisford, held from the Cloville family as superiors who held the manors at Pampisford as far back as 1428 from the Abbot of Ely, the original superior. The Victoria County History states "the lords [superiors] of the manor were non-resident from the mid 15th to the mid 19th century". In his Will, John Killingworth describes Pampisford as his "chief mansion". The old parish registers for Pampisford record the burial there of "John Killingworth, Esquire", on 24 May 1617. "In a house in Pampisford there are, in the parlour window, Arms for Richard Killingworth [d.1586] and his wife Margaret Beriff, and in one of the main bedrooms are Arms for his son (inscription:) 'John Killingworth Esquire [who] married Beatrice daughter of Robert Alington'. In the same window are another set of Arms for John Killingworth and his second wife Elizabeth Cheyney. It is presumed this was the manor house at that time.

Pampisford Hall, the principal manor of the village, was acquired by marriage with the Marsh heiress in the early 18th century by the Parker family. On the death of William Parker in 1776 the estate was divided for a time between his sisters, Grace and Elizabeth. Grace died in 1781 and her portion passed to Elizabeth, who married William Hamond. On her death in 1789 the whole estate passed to her son William Parker Hamond I who, in 1812, was succeeded by his son William Parker Hamond II. It was he who was responsible for erecting the hall (1820-1831) on farmland belonging to the Manor Farm, and laying out the grounds. During the 1860s the architectural partnership of Messrs Goldie and Child (see George Goldie) was commissioned to extend the Hall and in 1873, following his father's death, William Parker Hamond III continued to develop and extend the pleasure grounds and arboretum for a further twenty years until his death in 1893. In the park is a pinetum, planted with fir trees from Japan, Mexico, China, California, Austria, and the Pyrenees. His successor, Col R T Hamond (a cousin) sold most of the estate, including the park and Hall, to James Binney. He further extended the Hall, adding a new wing and a loggia along the south-west front. The Binney family remain today as the proprietors.

The sculptor Antony Gormley lived in a cottage at Pampisford whilst an undergraduate of Trinity College, Cambridge.

== Parish church ==
Inside the church porch is a simple Norman doorway with a tympanum. The porch contains ten small arches, which are filled with crude carvings that perhaps tell the story of John the Baptist, as evidenced by the block and the head of the figure lying on the floor. There is a modern carving of St John the Baptist with Christ as a finial for the domed cover of the Norman baptismal font.

The 650-year-old tower has a tiny spire, and the 15th-century chancel arch opens into a massive arcade in the Transitional style from Norman to Early English. The arch is screened with delicate oak tracery of the same age.

There is a chest tomb, possibly that of the founder of the chancel, against the north wall, just at the foot of the steps. It is covered with old English marble. Formerly there were labels around its rims, but they have been lost. There are large shields on the front and on each end of the monument, but no carvings can be seen on them now.

In 1742 the monuments inside the church were recorded and included: "on the south wall within the rails is a Mural Monument of white marble, with this inscription on a square of black marble in gold letters, which are now scarce[ly] visible: Here lyeth the Bodye of John Killingworth Esquier whoe was twyse married: his former [1st] wife was Beatrix, daughter of Robert Alington of Horseheath, by whome he had two sons and four daughters. The latter [2nd wife] was Elizabeth, daughter of William Cheyney, Esquier, by whom he had three sons and four daughters. He dyed the 23rd of Maye Anno 1617. Aetatis suae 70."

In the first south window of the nave are shields for four coats of arms, but the markings on only two of them can be understood, the other two being defaced. One is for the Parker family, who in the mid-18th century are said to be the then Lords of the Manor at Pampisford. Another is the Arms of the earlier Clovill family, superiors at Pampisford after the dissolution of Ely monastery.

In the churchyard are two more chest tombs, one of which is made of free-stone with a black marble top for Dr Robert Gell who died in 1665 aged 70.
