= Breckland Farmland =

Protected areas in east England

Coordinates: 52.4°N 0.6°E

- Site of Special Scientific Interest
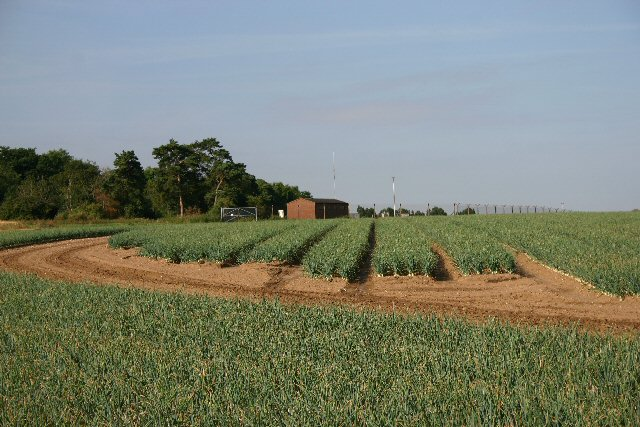
- Field of onions near Tuddenham
- Location of Breckland Farmland.
- Area of search: Norfolk, England; Suffolk, England
- Grid reference: TL 796 852
- Interest: Biological
- Area: 13,392.4 hectares
- Notification date: 2000
- Location map: Magic Map

Breckland Farmland is a 13,392.4 hectare biological Site of Special Scientific Interest (SSSI) in many separate areas between Swaffham in Norfolk and Bury St Edmunds in Suffolk, England. It is part of the Breckland Special Protection Area under the European Union Directive on the Conservation of Wild Birds.

The site is designated an SSSI for its internationally important population of stone curlews. These birds nest in March on bare ground in cultivated land with very short vegetation. Fields with sugar beet and vegetables and no recreational disturbance are preferred.

The site is almost all farmland with no public access.

Major landowners that own land within Breckland Farmland SSSI include the Ministry of Defence (parts of this protected area are located within Stanford Training area) and the Forestry Commission (parts of this protected area are located in Coldharbour plantation).
