= Melbourn =

Village in Cambridgeshire, England

Coordinates: 52°04′55″N 0°01′14″E

- Village
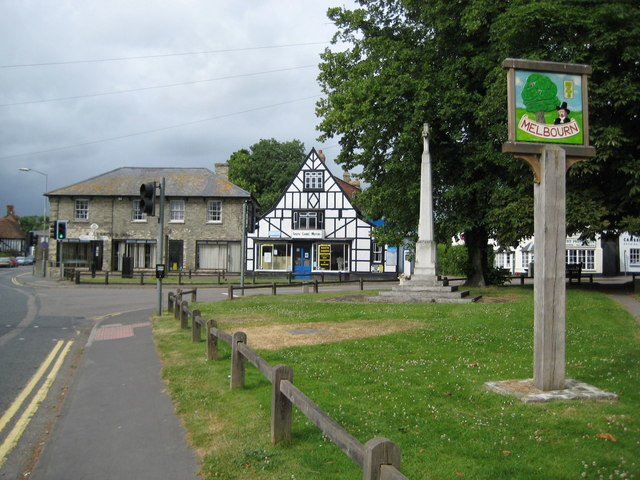

- Location within Cambridgeshire
- Population: 4,689 (2011)
- OS grid reference: TL385445
- District: South Cambridgeshire
- Shire county: Cambridgeshire
- Region: East
- Country: England
- Sovereign state: United Kingdom
- Post town: ROYSTON
- Postcode district: SG8
- Dialling code: 01763
- Police: Cambridgeshire
- Fire: Cambridgeshire
- Ambulance: East of England
- UK Parliament: South Cambridgeshire

Melbourn (/ˈmɛlbɔːrn/) is a large, clustered village in the far south-west of Cambridgeshire, England. Its traditional high street is bypassed by the A10, intersecting the settlement's other main axis exactly 3 miles (4.8 km) northwest of the traditional focal point of Royston, Hertfordshire, the nearest larger settlement. It has over 4,600 inhabitants and is in the South Cambridgeshire district.

The Prime Meridian passes through the south west corner of the parish of Melbourn.

== History ==
The parish has a long history of occupation, stemming from the presence of springs at Melbourn Bury and the several ancient trackways that cross the parish; the Icknield Way runs to the south of the parish and Ashwell Street and the Roman Cambridge-Royston road are also believed to follow prehistoric trackways. Pottery and burial finds show evidence of Bronze Age residents, and a Roman settlement has been found at the north-east edge of the village. Excavations in the 1950s discovered 28 graves from a 7th-century Christian burial site close to Ashwell Street.

Melbourn appears in five entries in Domesday Book.

The name "Melbourn" comes from Meldeburn, the "stream of a man named Melde".

== Church ==
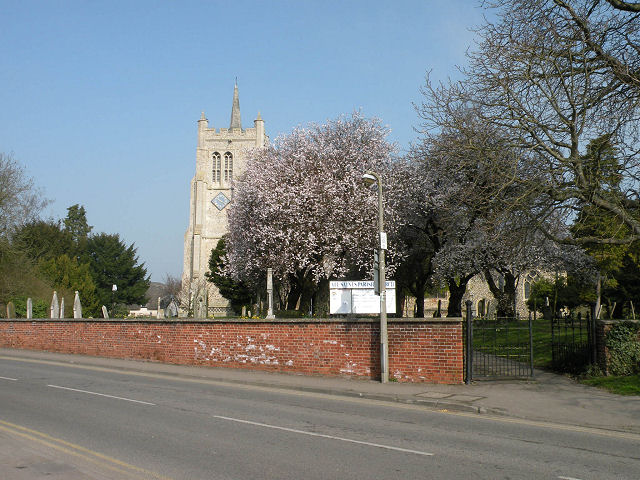
Spring blossom and tower of the oldest church in Melbourn, its Anglican church

The finding of a Saxon cemetery shows that Christianity has been present in Melbourn since the 7th century. The village also probably had an 11th-century chapel but the first record of a church is from 1152. The present church, dedicated to All Saints, is Grade II* listed. R.R. Rowe conducted a major restoration in 1882 but the church includes sections of the 13th-century building, including the chancel arch and sections of the tower. The font is 11th century.

== Village life ==
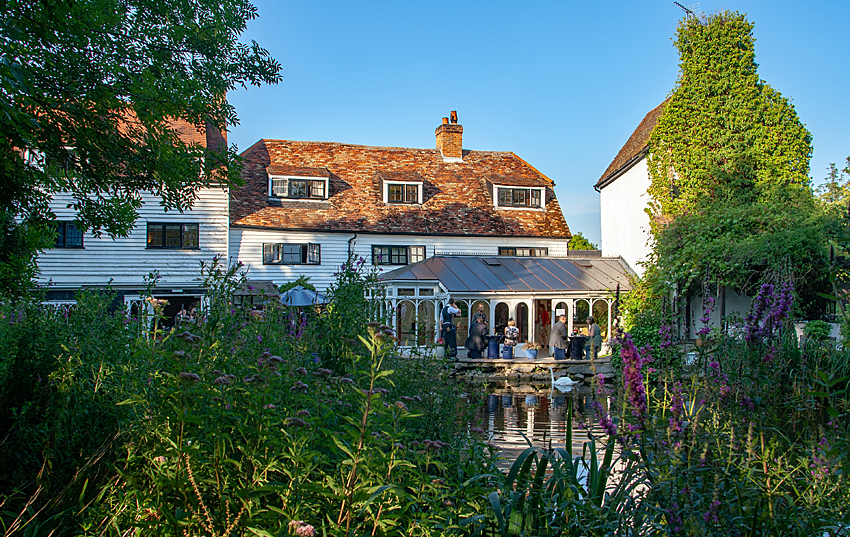
Sheene Mill on the River Mel

It has a primary school and a secondary school, Melbourn Village College. There is also a well-known science park. There is a butcher's, a co-op food shop, five hairdressers, a barber shop, two estate agents, two pubs, a newsagent, a sub-post office, two garages and three churches (Anglican, Baptist and URC). Sheene Mill, on the River Mel northwest of the village, is now a hotel and restaurant, formerly owned by the television chef Steven Saunders. It is a Grade II listed building.

The nearest railway station is Meldreth, in the neighbouring village, which opened in 1851 on the Cambridge line.

=== Pubs ===
Melbourn was much visited by travellers by the 17th century and is listed as having an inn in 1622. By the late 18th century the village supported three: the Dog', of unknown history; the Red Lion, that closed towards the end of the 19th century, and the Hoops, that closed in the early 20th century. In 1865 the village had 11 inns and pubs, including the Black Horse, the Star, the White Lion, the Anchor, the Carriers Arms and the Red Cow. The Rose Inn and the Coach and Horses opened in around 1850. The oldest of the two present public houses is the Dolphin, which dates from 1818.
