= Roman Road, Cambridgeshire =

Site of Special Scientific Interest in England

Coordinates: 52.145°N 0.229°E

Roman Road
- Site of Special Scientific Interest
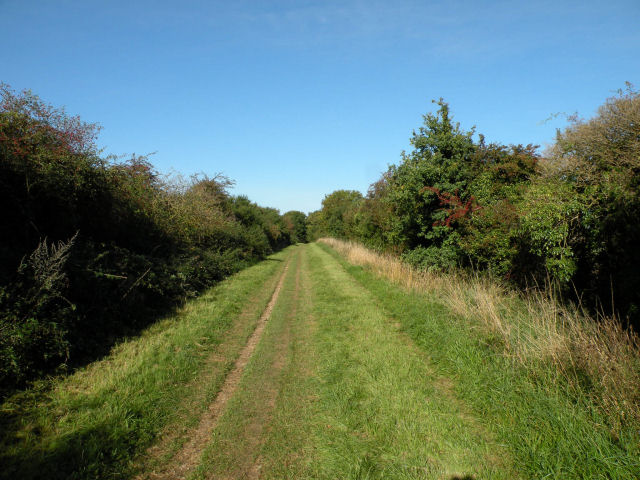
- Location of Roman Road.
- Area of search: Cambridgeshire
- Grid reference: TL 526 520
- Interest: Biological
- Area: 12.4 hectares
- Notification date: 1984
- Location map: Magic Map

The Roman Road in Cambridgeshire, also known as Worsted Street Roman Road, is a 12.4-hectare (31-acre) linear biological Site of Special Scientific Interest stretching from south-east of Cambridge to north of Linton. It is also a Scheduled Monument, and is maintained by Cambridgeshire County Council.

This green lane has calcareous grassland, thick hedges and small copses, which provide a valuable habitat for invertebrates. There are grasses such as sheep’s-fescue and quaking-grass, while herbs include wild carrot and purple milk-vetch.

The date of the road is uncertain, but archaeological excavation has confirmed that it is Roman, and probably constructed later than the first century. It was a local road connecting Cambridge to the Icknield Way.

The road is a public footpath and part of the E2 European long distance path.
