= Icknield Way =

Ancient trackway in England

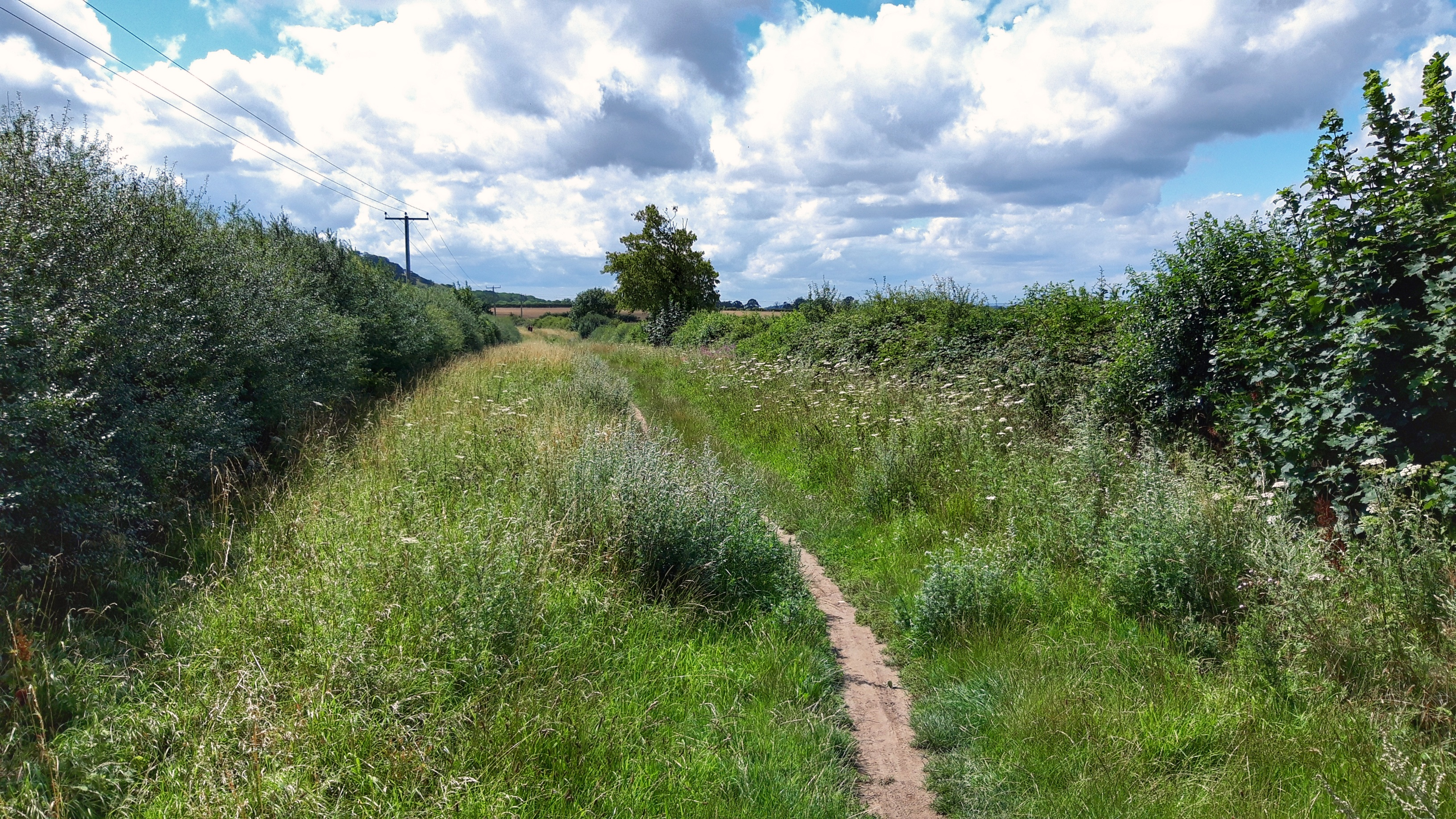
Icknield Way near Lewknor in Oxfordshire

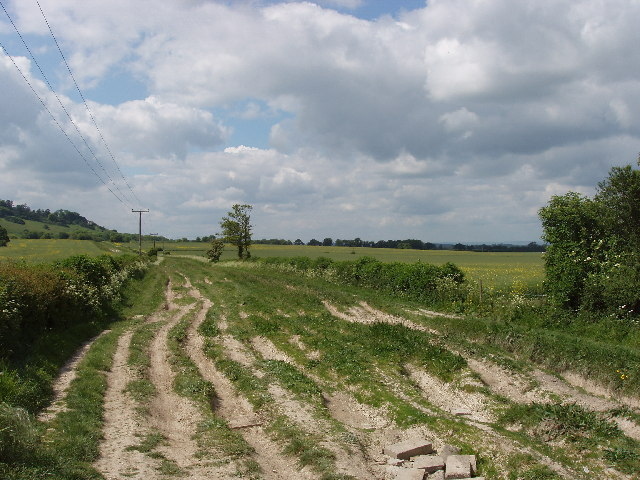
The same view of the Icknield Way near Lewknor from 2005 before the byway was restricted to exclude motor vehicles

The Icknield Way is an ancient trackway in southern and eastern England that runs from Norfolk to Wiltshire. It follows the chalk escarpment that includes the Berkshire Downs and Chiltern Hills.

== Background ==
It is generally said to be, within Great Britain, one of the oldest roads the route of which can still be traced, being one of the few long-distance trackways to have existed before the Romans occupied the country. However, this has been disputed, and the evidence for its being a prehistoric route has been questioned.

The name is Celto-British in derivation, and may be named after the Iceni tribe. They may have established this route to permit trade with other parts of the country from their base in East Anglia. It has also been suggested that the road has older prehistoric origins. The name is also said to have been initially used for the part to the west and south (i.e. south of the River Thames) but now refers usually to the track or traces north of the Thames.

From ancient times, at least as early as the Iron Age period (before the Roman invasion of 43 AD) and through early medieval times, it stretched from Berkshire through Oxfordshire and crossed the River Thames at Cholsey, near Wallingford.

== Early documentary evidence ==
The earliest mentions of the Icknield Way are in Anglo-Saxon charters from the year 903 onwards. The oldest surviving copies were made in the 12th and 13th centuries, and these use the spellings Ic(c)enhilde weġ, Icenhylte, Icenilde weġ, Ycenilde weġ and Icenhilde weġ. The charters refer to locations at Wanborough, Hardwell in Uffington, Lockinge, Harwell, Blewbury and Risborough, which span a distance of 40 miles (64 km) from Wiltshire to Buckinghamshire.

== The "Four Highways" of medieval England ==
The Icknield Way was one of four highways that appear in the literature of the 1130s. Henry of Huntingdon wrote that the Ermine Street, Fosse Way, Watling Street and Icknield Way had been constructed by royal authority. The Leges Edwardi Confessoris gave royal protection to travellers on these roads, and the Icknield Way was said to extend across the width of the kingdom. Geoffrey of Monmouth elaborated the story by saying that Belinus had improved the four roads so that it was clear that they were the protected highways.

Around 1250, the Four Highways were shown by Matthew Paris on a diagrammatic map of Britain called Scema Britannie. The Icknield Way is depicted by a straight line from Salisbury (i.e., Old Sarum) to Bury St Edmunds which intersects the other three roads near Dunstable.

=== Icknield Street ===
In the fourteenth century, Ranulf Higdon described a different route for the Icknield Way: from Winchester to Tynemouth by way of Birmingham, Lichfield, Derby, Chesterfield and York. This route includes the Roman road running from Bourton-on-the-Water to Templeborough near Rotherham, which is now called Icknield Street (or Ryknild Street) to distinguish it from the Icknield Way.

== Route ==
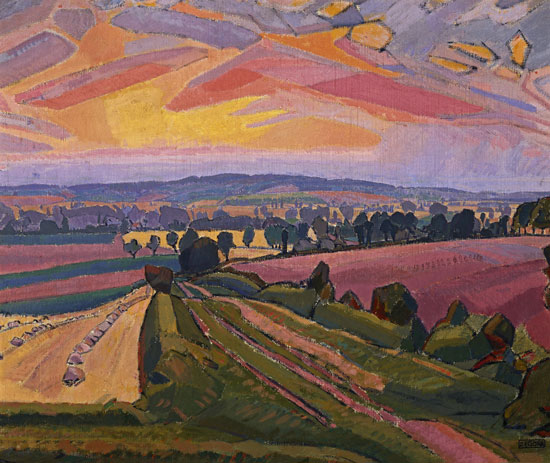
Spencer Gore: "Icknield Way", 1912. Used as the cover picture of "The Icknield Way Path – A Walkers' Guide" published by the Icknield Way Association in 2012

In many places the track consists or consisted of several routes, particularly as it passes along the line of the escarpment of the Chilterns, probably because of the seasonal usage, and possibly the amount of traffic especially of herds or flocks of livestock.

To the west the track can be detected below the escarpments of the Berkshire Downs. Near Wantage, the route along the ridge of the Downs is known as The Ridgeway, and the name Icknield Way is applied to a parallel lowland route above the spring line at the northern edge of the chalk. Between Lewknor and Ivinghoe there are two parallel courses known as the Lower Icknield Way and the Upper Icknield Way. In Cambridgeshire, Street Way (Ashwell Street), Ditch Way and others have been put forward as variant routes, possibly for use in summer or winter.

Many modern roads follow the Icknield Way, such as the B489 from Aston Clinton to Dunstable and the A505 from Baldock to Royston. In some places, especially from the east of Luton in Bedfordshire to Ickleford (so named from the Way crossing a stream) near Hitchin in Hertfordshire, the route is followed by minor roads, and is not distinguishable at all in many places, except by landscape features such as barrows and mounds which line the route, and indentation presumably from ancient and frequent use. It could be described as a belt studded with archaeological sites found at irregular intervals.

The Icknield Way used to form part of the boundary between Hertfordshire and Cambridgeshire, and at one time Royston was cut in two by this boundary. Royston is where the Icknield Way crosses Ermine Street.

In the south-west some writers take the Way to Exeter, while others only take it as far as Salisbury. To the north-east, Icklingham, Suffolk, and Caistor-by-Norwich, Yarmouth and Hunstanton, Norfolk, have all been proposed as the destination. In support of the western route, a road at Dersingham near Hunstanton was named Ykenildestrethe and Ikelynge Street in the 13th century.

== Modern paths ==
Modern long-distance footpaths have been created from Lyme Regis on the Dorset coast to Holme-next-the-Sea on the Norfolk coast, following the general line of the Icknield Way.

The Hobhouse Committee report of 1947 suggested the creation of a path between Seaton Bay and the Chiltern ridge, and in 1956 Tom Stephenson proposed a longer route to Cambridge. A route through Norfolk was discussed in the 1960s.

The first section to be officially designated as a Long-Distance Footpath (as National Trails were then known) was that from Overton Hill to Ivinghoe Beacon, and it was declared open as the Ridgeway in 1973. The Peddars Way, from Knettishall Heath to Holme-next-the-Sea, forms part of the Peddars Way and Norfolk Coast Path National Trail, which was opened as a Long Distance Route in 1986. Between the Ridgeway and Peddars Way, parts of the original line of the Icknield Way had been covered in tarmac or built over, so a route was devised that avoids walking on roads. In 1992, this was designated by the Countryside Commission as a Regional Route called the Icknield Way Path. The Wessex Ridgeway from Lyme Regis to Marlborough was declared open by Dorset County Council in 1994.

Charles Thurstan Shaw, archaeologist and long-distance walker, founded the Icknield Way Association which campaigned to reopen the entire Icknield Way as a long-distance path in 1984, the same year he produced the first walker's guide to the route.

The combination of the Wessex Ridgeway, Ridgeway, Icknield Way and Peddars Way, together with the Cranborne Droves Way and Sarsen Way, is promoted as a family of routes called the Great Chalk Way. The author Ray Quinlan calls a similar route the Greater Ridgeway, with a length of approximately 584 kilometres (363 mi) from Lyme Regis to Hunstanton.

Parts of the Ridgeway National Trail and the Icknield Way Path are only usable as a footpath, so the Icknield Way Path Riders Route or Icknield Way Trail have been created for horseriders and cyclists. The route runs from Bledlow to Roudham Heath, where it joins the Peddars Way Riders Route.

== Artists and writers on the Way ==
The Icknield Way has inspired a number of writers and artists. Spencer Gore, the founder of the Camden Town Group of artists, painted the route in 1912 while staying with his friend Harold Gilman at Letchworth. His work, influenced by Cézanne, Van Gogh and Gauguin, is acknowledged as one of the pioneering works of British Modernism. One of the best known literary travellers of the Icknield Way is the poet Edward Thomas, who walked the path in 1911 and published his account in 1913. Thomas was interested in ancient roads and inspired by Hilaire Belloc's Old Road and other travel memoirs published by Constable written by R. Hippisley Cox, Harold J. E. Peake and others. Although the book takes the form of a single 10-day journey, Thomas wrote the book in stages over the course of a year. He was often joined by his brother Julian, both rising at 5 am or 6 am to walk 30–40 mi (48–64 km) a day. Although more interested in poetic description, his publisher directed him to give more concrete details of his route, thus the book is closer to being a guidebook than Thomas' earlier, more poetic, travel books. Inspired by Thomas's journey, contemporary British nature writer Robert MacFarlane begins his book of walking ancient paths, The Old Ways, by walking the Icknield Way, "hoping to summon him [Thomas] by walking where he had walked". George R. R. Martin used the "Four Highways" as the model for the Kingsway in his A Song of Ice and Fire novels. The first episode of the 2016–17 documentary series Britain's Ancient Tracks with Tony Robinson was about the Icknield Way and included drone views of the trail.

== See also ==
- Roman Britain
- Roman roads in Britain
- Neolithic Age
