= Bibliographical Society (disambiguation) =

The Bibliographical Society, headquartered in the U.K., deals with the study of the book and its history.

Bibliographical Society may also refer to:

- Bibliographical Society of America
- Bibliographical Society of Australia and New Zealand; see Dietrich Borchardt
- Bibliographical Society of Canada/La Société bibliographique du Canada; see Douglas Lochhead
- Bibliographical Society of the University of Virginia
- Cambridge Bibliographical Society; see Timeline of Cambridge
- Glasgow Bibliographical Society; see Sylvia Murray
- Edinburgh Bibliographical Society; see Oliphant, Anderson and Ferrier
- Oxford Bibliographical Society, co-founded by Strickland Gibson
- Welsh Bibliographical Society
