= Timeline of Cambridge =

Coordinates: 52.205°N 0.119°E

The following is a timeline of the history of the city of Cambridge, England.

== Prior to 16th century ==
- 973 – Market active
- c. 1000–50 – St Bene't's Church built
- 1068 – Cambridge Castle erected
- 1101 – Town incorporated
- c. 1130 – Holy Sepulchre church built
- 1144 – Cambridge is sacked by Geoffrey de Mandeville, 1st Earl of Essex
- 1154 – Cambridge fair active
- 1200 – Charter granted
- 1209 – University of Cambridge established by scholars from Oxford
- 1211 – Stourbridge fair first recorded
- 1213 – Hervey FitzEustace, first recorded mayor
- c. 1215 – Richard of Wetheringsett, first Chancellor of the University of Cambridge
- 1231 – The University is recognised by a writ of authority over its townspeople from Henry III
- 1233 – A letter from Pope Gregory IX grants privileges to the University's scholars
- 1261 – Cambridge academics attempt to set up a university of Northampton, suppressed by the Crown in 1265
- 1266 – Raided by Barons who had been disinherited after the Battle of Evesham, and the murder of the Jews in the town
- 1275 – Expulsion of the town's Jews by Queen Dowager Eleanor of Provence
- 1284 – University's Peterhouse college founded
- 1326 – Clare College founded
- 1347 – Pembroke College founded
- 1348 – Gonville and Caius College founded
- 1350 – Trinity Hall college founded
- 1352 – Corpus Christi College founded
- 1381 – Disorder during the Peasants' Revolt
- 1416 – University Library exists by this date
- 1441 – King's College founded
- 1446 – Foundation stone of King's College Chapel laid
- 1448 – Queens' College founded
- 1473 – St. Catherine College founded
- 1496 – Jesus College founded

== 16th-18th centuries ==
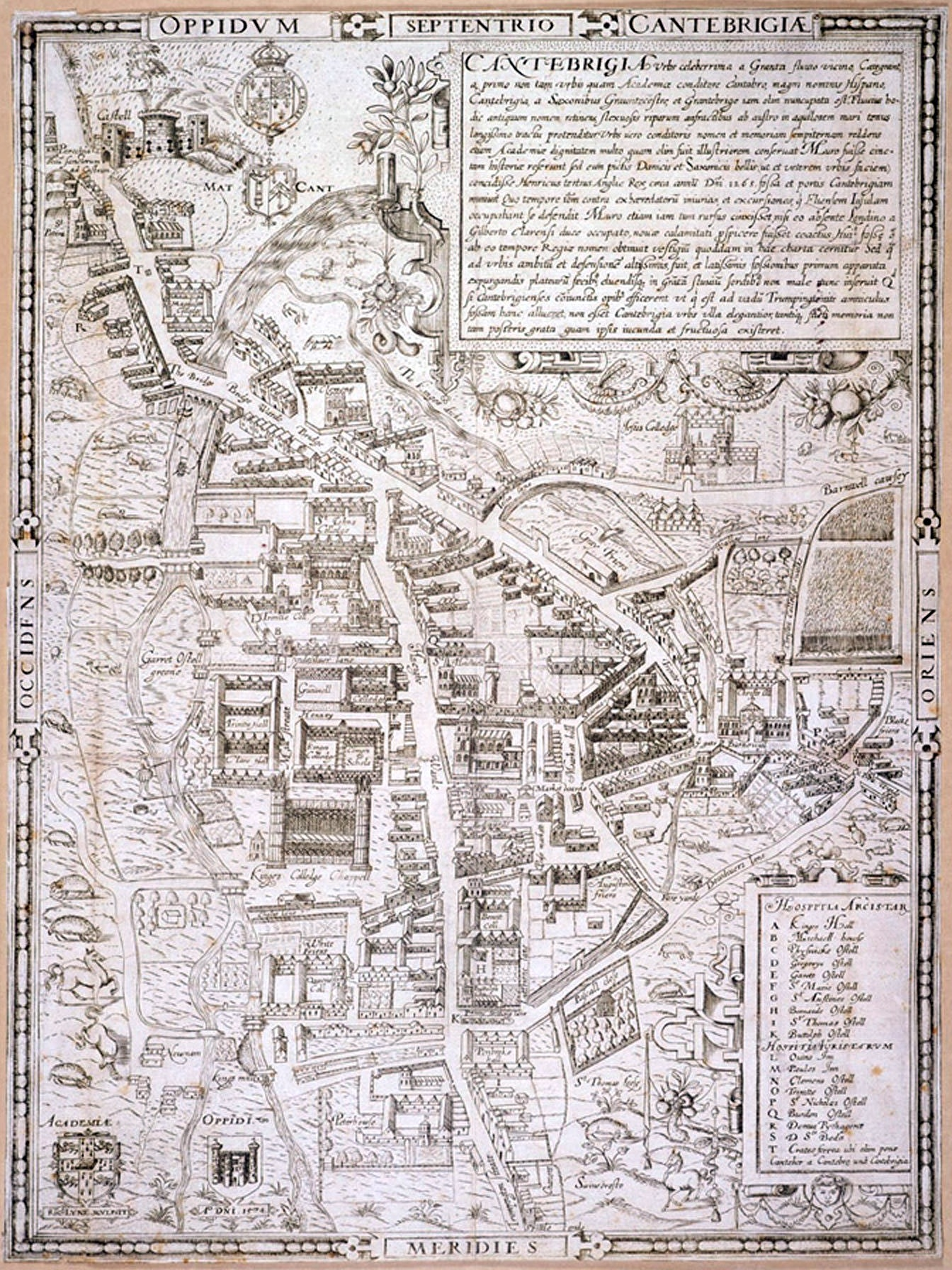
Map of Cambridge, 1574

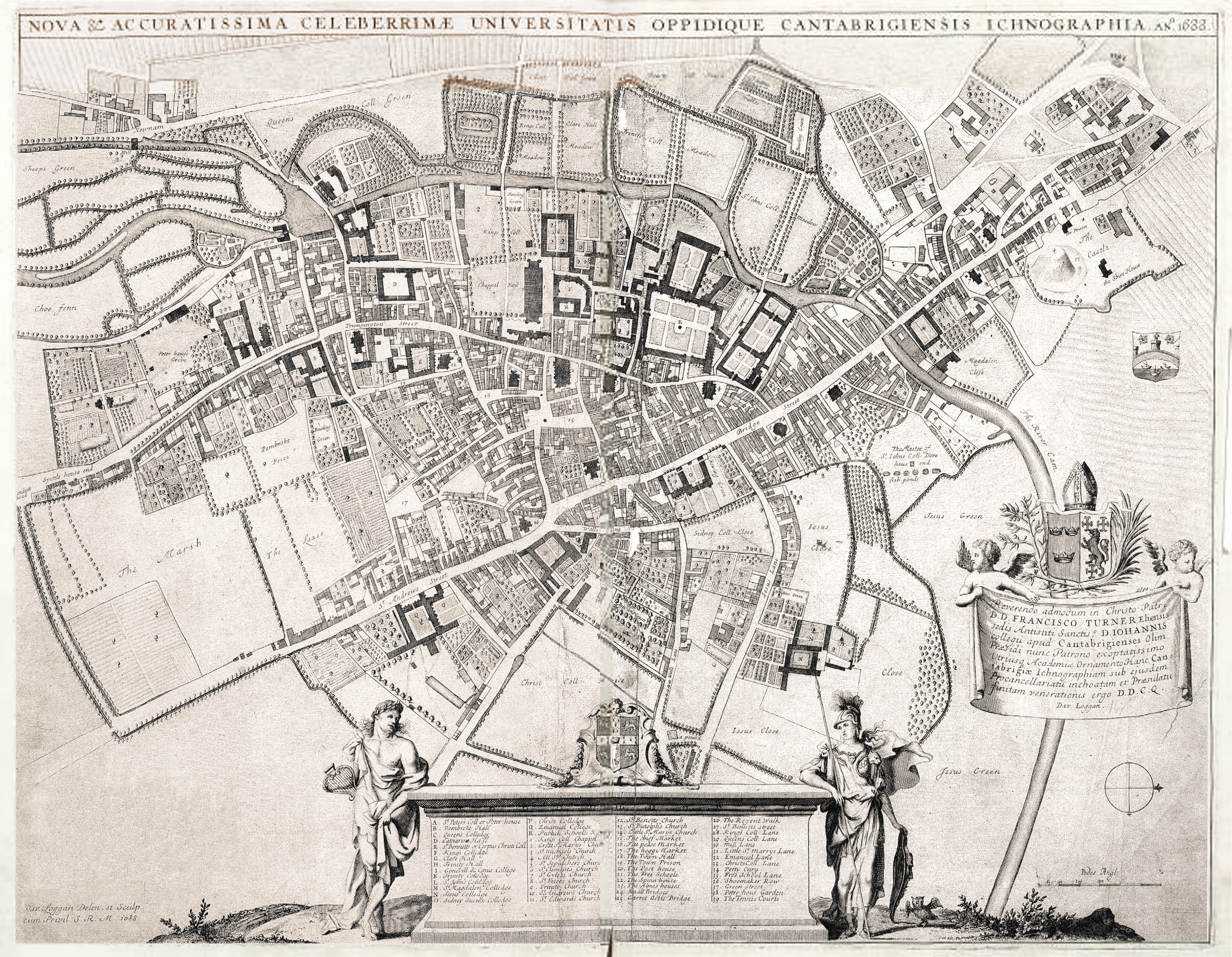
Map of Cambridge, 1688

- 1505 – Christ's College founded
- 1511 – St John's College established
- 1515 – King's College Chapel fan vault completed
- 1521 – John Siberch is active as a printer, the earliest known here
- 1525 – Robert Barnes gives probably the first openly evangelical sermon in an English church, at St Edward King and Martyr
- 1534 – University Press granted a royal charter
- 1542 – Magdalene College founded
- 1546 – Trinity College founded
- 1556 – John Hullier burned as a Protestant on Jesus Green
- 1584 – Emmanuel College founded
- 1595 – Sidney Sussex College founded
- 1614 – Hobson's Conduit completed
- 1615 – Perse School founded
- 1638 – Cambridge, Massachusetts named
- 1640
  - Clare College Bridge completed
  - Oliver Cromwell elected Member of Parliament for Cambridge
- 1643 – Some bridges pulled down by Cromwell's forces
- 1667 – Eagle and Child pub in business
- 1695 – Wren Library at Trinity College completed
- 1730 – University's Senate House completed
- 1744 – Cambridge Journal and Weekly Flying Post begins publication
- 1747 – Shire-hall built
- 1749 – Mathematical Bridge first built at Queens' College
- 1762 – Cambridge Chronicle newspaper begins publication
- 1766 – Addenbrooke's Hospital founded
- 1784 – Society for Promoting Useful Knowledge established
- 1793
  - Cambridge Intelligencer newspaper begins publication
  - Cambridge Quarters composed for new clock of the Church of St Mary the Great

== 19th century ==
- 1810 – Downing College founded
- 1815 – Cambridge Union founded as a student debating society
- 1816 – Fitzwilliam Museum founded
- 1817 – Cambridge Town Club (cricket club) formed
- 1828
  - Bull Hotel in business
  - Cambridge University Boat Club founded
- 1829 – The Boat Race, rowed against Oxford, begins (annual from 1856)
- 1831 – Bridge of Sighs built over the Cam at St John's College
- 1833 – The Pitt Building built in honour of William Pitt the Younger, an undergraduate of Pembroke College and Prime Minister, to house the printing and publishing offices of Cambridge University Press
- 1833 – Anatomy theatre attacked by a mob
- 1839 – Cambridge Advertiser newspaper begins publication
- 1840 – Cambridge Antiquarian Society founded
- 1841 – Cambridge's first post-reformation Roman Catholic church opens as St Andrew's Church
- 1845 – Eastern Counties Railway begins operating to Cambridge railway station
- 1848 – Mill Road Cemetery established
- 1853 – Cambridge Water Company authorised by Cambridge University and Town Waterworks Act
- 1854 – Deighton, Bell & Co. booksellers in business
- 1855–6 – Following provision of a piped water supply, the Hobson's Conduit fountain from the market place is moved to form a memorial
- 1858 – Cambridge School of Art founded
- 1869 – Girton College for women founded
- 1871
  - Newnham College for women founded
  - Universities Tests Act removes restrictions which have previously limited access to the ancient universities to members of the Church of England (although Propaganda Fide at this time discourages attendance by Catholics)
- 1874 – Cavendish Laboratory completed
- 1876 – W. Heffer bookseller begins business as a stationer
- 1880
  - Cambridge Street Tramways begin operation
  - St Radegund pub built on part of the site of the Garrick Hotel
- 1881 – Ridley Hall and Westcott House theological colleges founded
- 1883 – Footlights student amateur dramatic club founded
- 1884 – Museum of Archaeology and Anthropology founded
- 1888 – Cambridge Daily News begins publication
- 1890
  - Our Lady and the English Martyrs Church consecrated
  - Victoria Bridge opened to improve access to the city from Chesterton
- 1894 – Homerton College, a Congregationalist teacher training college, moves to Cambridge
- 1895 – Roman Catholics are permitted by their hierarchy to attend the ancient universities
- 1896
  - St Edmund's House is established primarily as a hall of residence for Catholic students, utilising the former premises of Ayerst Hostel
  - Pye Ltd established as scientific instrument makers by W. G. Pye
- 1897 – Diamond Jubilee of Queen Victoria
- 1899 – Westminster College, a Presbyterian theological college, moves to Cambridge

== 20th century ==
- 1901 – Population: 38,379
- 1908 – Cambridge Town F.C. formed
- 1912
  - Cambridge United F.C. established as Abbey United
  - University's Sedgwick Museum of Earth Sciences opens
- 1914 – Cambridge Street Tramways cease operation
- 1918 – First Festival of Nine Lessons and Carols held at King's College
- c 1921 – Fitzbillies bakery opened by Ernest and Arthur Mason in Trumpington Street
- 1922 – War Memorial unveiled
- 1923 – Jesus Green Swimming Pool opens
- 1926 – Fen Causeway officially opened
- 1928 – Cambridge Preservation Society founded
- 1934 – New University Library completed
- 1938 – Cambridge Airport opens
- 1939 – London educational institutions evacuated to Cambridge: Queen Mary College to King's College (until 1945); London Hospital Medical College (until 1943) and The Bartlett (until 1945) to St Catharine's College; SOAS to Christ's College; London School of Economics to Peterhouse (until 1945); Bedford College to Newnham College (until 1944); and Barts to Queens' College (until 1946)
- 1948 – First women admitted to study for full academic degrees in the University but have no associated privileges
- 1949
  - University's Cambridge Bibliographical Society founded
  - University of Cambridge's Electronic Delay Storage Automatic Calculator begins operating
- 1951 – City charter granted
- 1953 – Francis Crick and James D. Watson from the Cavendish Laboratory enter The Eagle, Cambridge, for a pub lunch announcing "We have discovered the secret of life"
- 1954 – Murray Edwards College for women founded as New Hall
- 1956 – Kettle's Yard established by Jim Ede
- 1957 – Twinned with Heidelberg
- 1958 – Churchill College established
- 1958–9 – Silver Street Bridge built
- 1960
  - Garret Hostel Bridge built
  - Cambridge Consultants founded
- 1962 – Addenbrooke's Hospital begins to move from Trumpington Street to its south Cambridge site
- 1964
  - Darwin College for graduates founded
  - Cambridge Folk Festival begins
- 1965
  - Lucy Cavendish College for mature women founded
  - Wolfson College for mature students founded as University College
- 1966
  - Clare Hall for graduates established
  - Fitzwilliam College chartered as a college
- 1970
  - February: Garden House riot
  - Heffer's open a flagship bookshop in Trinity Street
- 1971 – Elizabeth Way Bridge opened
- 1972
  - Three previously all-male colleges of the University admit women undergraduates
  - Cambridge Theological Federation formed
- 1974
  - First Strawberry Fair held
  - First Cambridge Beer Festival held
- 1975 – University's Cambridge Science Park founded
- 1976
  - Sancton Wood School founded
  - First Andy's Records store opened in Mill Road
- 1977 – Robinson College founded
- 1984 – Addenbrooke's Hospital treats its last patient at its Trumpington Street site
- 1986 – St Edmund's House is renamed St Edmund's College
- 1989 – Cambridge Fun Run (footrace) begins
- 1990
  - Royal Greenwich Observatory relocated to Cambridge from Herstmonceux Castle
  - ARM Holdings established as Advanced RISC Machines Ltd
- 1992 – Anglia Ruskin University is established as a public university
- 1998
  - Abcam established
  - St Edmund's College is granted a royal charter confirming its full collegiate status

== 21st century ==
- 2003 – University's Centre for Mathematical Sciences completed in West Cambridge
- 2006
  - Local Plan 2006 (town planning) adopted
  - Cambridge International School established
- 2007 – The Centre for Computing History is established
- 2008
  - New Hall renamed Murray Edwards College
  - Riverside Bridge opens
- 2009 – Anne Jarvis becomes first woman University Librarian of the University of Cambridge
- 2010 – Homerton College chartered as a full college of the University of Cambridge
- 2011 – Phase One of the Cambridgeshire Guided Busway opens
- 2013 – North West Cambridge development planned
- 2016 – New global headquarters for AstraZeneca projected for completion on the Cambridge Biomedical Campus
- 2017 – Cambridge North railway station opens
- 2019
  - Sonita Alleyne becomes the first black woman elected as head of an Oxbridge college, Master of Jesus
  - The Royal Papworth Hospital relocates to the Cambridge Biomedical Campus

== See also ==
- History of Cambridge
- History of University of Cambridge
- History of Cambridgeshire
