= Limekiln Close and East Pit =

Nature reserve in Cambridgeshire, England

Coordinates: 52.182°N 0.171°E

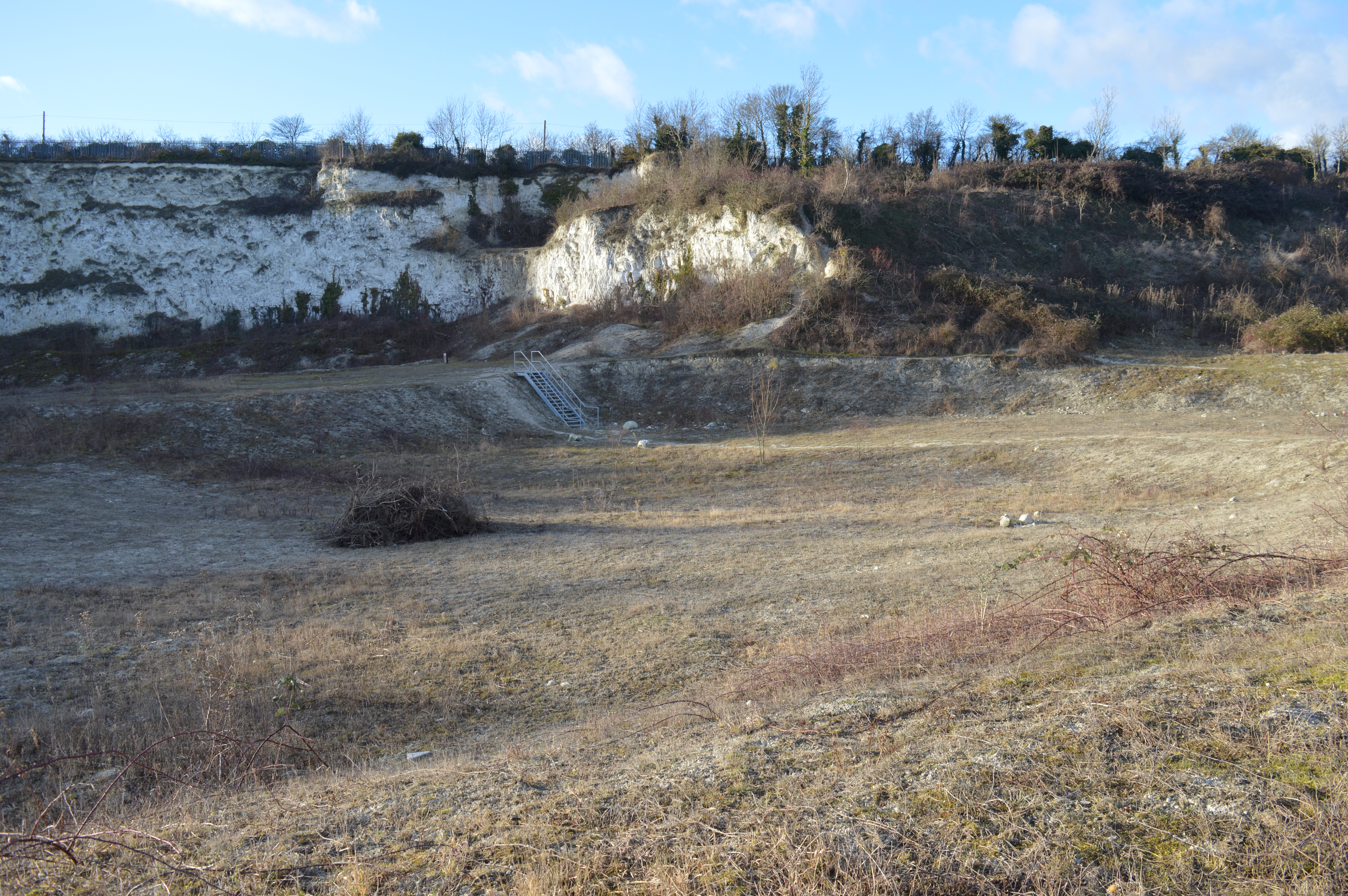
- East Pit
- Interactive map of Limekiln Close and East Pit
- Type: Local Nature Reserve
- Location: Cherry Hinton, Cambridgeshire
- OS grid: TL 485 560
- Area: 10 hectares (25 acres)
- Manager: Wildlife Trust for Bedfordshire, Cambridgeshire and Northamptonshire

Limekiln Close and East Pit is a 10 hectare Local Nature Reserve (LNR) in Cherry Hinton, on the south-eastern outskirts of Cambridge. It is managed by the Wildlife Trust for Bedfordshire, Cambridgeshire and Northamptonshire as Cherry Hinton Chalk Pits. East Pit is part of the Cherry Hinton Pit biological Site of Special Scientific Interest, which excludes Limekiln Close but includes the neighbouring West Pit.

The two parts of the site are both former chalk quarries. East Pit is surrounded by steep walls of chalk, and the base is wildflower grassland with areas of scrub. Flowers include millkwort, harebell, kidney vetch and the rare moon carrot, which is on the British Red List of Threatened Species. Quarrying ceased 200 years ago in Limekiln Close, and it is now steeply sloping mature woodland with ash and cherry trees.

The site has been designated a Local Nature Reserve by Cambridge City Council, which shows it as one LNR and West Pit as a separate LNR. However, the LNRs are confusingly shown on the Natural England website. One is shown as Limekiln Close and West Pit on the details page, but the map only covers Limekiln Close. The other LNR is shown on the details page as East Pit, whereas the map covers both East and West Pits.

There is no access between the two parts of the site, but they have adjacent entrances on Limekiln Road.
