= History of Cambridgeshire =

Map of the Cambridgeshire area (1904)

The English county of Cambridgeshire has a long history.

== Anglo-Saxon times ==
The area that is now Cambridgeshire was settled at about the 6th century by groups of Angles, who pushed their way up the Ouse and the Cam, and established themselves in the fen-district, where they became known as the Gyrwas, the districts corresponding to the modern counties of Huntingdonshire and Cambridgeshire being distinguished as the lands of the North Gyrwas and the South Gyrwas respectively. At this period the fen-district stretched southward as far as Cambridge, and the essential unity which it preserved is illustrated later by its inclusion under one sheriff, chosen in successive years from Cambridgeshire proper and the Liberty of the Isle of Ely.

In 656 numerous lands in the neighbourhood of Wisbech were included in the endowment of the abbey of Peterborough, and in the same century religious houses were established at Ely and Thorney, both of which, however, were destroyed during the Danish invasions of the 9th century. After the Treaty of Wedmore, the district became part of the Danelaw. On the expulsion of the Danes by Edward the Elder in the 10th century it was included in East Anglia, but in the 11th century was again overrun by the Danes, who in the course of their devastations burnt Cambridge. The first mention of the shire in the Anglo-Saxon Chronicle records the valiant resistance which it opposed to the invaders in 1010 when the rest of East Anglia had taken ignominious flight. The shire-system of East Anglia was in all probability not definitely settled before the Norman conquest of England, but during the Danish occupation of the 9th century the district possessed a certain military and political organization round Cambridge, its chief town, whence probably originated the constitution and demarcation of the later shire.

== Division of Cambridgeshire ==
At the time of the Domesday Survey the county was divided as now, except that the Isle of Ely, which then formed two hundreds having their meeting-place at Witchford, is now divided into the four hundreds of Ely, Wisbech, North Witchford and South Witchford, while Cambridge formed a hundred by itself. The hundred of Flendish was then known as Flamingdike. Cambridgeshire was formerly included in the diocese of Lincoln. On the creation of the diocese of Ely in 1109, almost the whole county was placed in that diocese. In 1291 the whole county, with the exception of parishes in the deanery of Fordham and diocese of Norwich, constituted the archdeaconry of Ely, comprising the deaneries of Ely, Wisbech, Chesterton, Shingay, Bourn, Barton and Camps.

== Politics ==
The Isle of Ely formerly constituted an independent franchise in which the bishops exercised quasi-palatinate rights, and offences were held to be committed against the bishop's peace. These privileges were considerably abridged in the reign of Henry VIII, but the Isle still had separate civil officers, appointed by the bishop, chief among whom were the chief justice, chief bailiff, deputy bailiff and two coroners.

Cambridgeshire has always been remarkable for its lack of county families, and for the frequent changes in the ownership of estates. No Englishmen retained lands of any importance after the Conquest, and at the time of the Domesday Survey the chief lay proprietors were Alan, Earl of Brittany, whose descendants the Zouches retained estates in the county until the 15th century; Picot the sheriff, whose estates passed to the families of Peverell and Peche; Aubrey de Vere, whose descendants retained their estates until the 16th century; and Hardwinus de Scalariis, ancestor of the Scales of Whaddon.

From the time of Hereward's famous resistance to William the Conqueror in the fen-district, the Isle of Ely was intimately concerned with the great political struggles of the country.

- It was defended against King Stephen by Bishop Nigellus of Ely, who fortified Ely and Aldreth, which in 1144 was held for the Empress Matilda by Geoffrey de Mandeville.
- During the struggles between John and his barons, Faukes de Breaut was made governor of Cambridge Castle, which, however, surrendered to the barons in the same year.
- The Isle of Ely was seized by the followers of Simon de Montfort in 1266, but in 1267 was taken by Prince Edward.
- At the Reformation period the county showed much sympathy with the Reformers, and in 1642 the knights, gentry and commoners of Cambridgeshire petitioned for the removal of all unwarrantable orders and dignities, and the banishment of Popish clergy.
- In the Civil War of the 17th century Cambridgeshire was one of the associated counties in which the King had no visible party, although the University assisted him with contributions of plate and money.

Cambridgeshire returned three members to Parliament in 1290, and in 1295 the county returned two members, the borough of Cambridge two members, and the city of Ely two members, this being the sole return for Ely. The university was summoned to return members in 1300 and again in 1603, but no returns are recorded before 1614, after which it continued to return two members. Under the Reform Act 1832 the county returned three members.

== Economy ==
Cambridgeshire is historically an agricultural county. The Domesday Survey mentions over 90 mills and numerous valuable fisheries, especially eel-fisheries, and contains frequent references to wheat, malt and honey. The county had a flourishing wool-industry in the 14th century, and became noted for its worsted cloths. The Black Death of 1349 and the ravages committed during the Wars of the Roses were followed by periods of severe depression, and in 1439 several Cambridgeshire towns obtained a remission of taxation on the plea of poverty. In the 16th century, barley for malt was grown in large quantities in the south, and the manufacture of willow baskets was carried on in the fen-districts. Saffron was extensively cultivated in the 18th century, and paper was manufactured near Sturbridge. Sturbridge fair was at this period reckoned the largest in Europe, the chief articles of merchandise being wool, hops and leather; and the Newmarket races and horse trade were already famous. Large waste areas were brought under cultivation in the 17th century through the drainage of the fen-district, which was brought to completion about 1652 through the labors of Cornelius Vermuyden, a Dutchman. The coprolite industry was very profitable for a short period from 1850 to 1880, and its decline was accompanied by a general industrial and agricultural depression.

== Antiquities in ecclesiastical architecture ==
Cambridgeshire would be rich only in the possession of the cathedral at Ely and the round church of the Holy Sepulchre, Jesus College and King's College chapels, and many other examples in Cambridge. At Thorney, a small town in the north of the county, which owes much in appearance to the 8th Duke of Bedford (d. 1872), the parish church is actually a portion of the church of an abbey said to date originally from the 7th century, and refounded in 972 by Aethelwold, Bishop of Winchester, as a Benedictine monastery. The church is partly fine Norman. Another Norman building of special interest is Sturbridge chapel near Cambridge, which belonged to a lepers' hospital. To this foundation King John granted a fair, which became, and continued until the 18th century, one of the most important in England. At Swaffham Prior there are remains of two churches in one churchyard, the tower of one being Transitional Norman, while that of the other is Perpendicular, the upper part octagonal. Among many Early English examples St Andrew's Church, Cherry Hinton near Cambridge may be mentioned. The churches of Trumpington and Bottisham are examples of the Decorated style; in the first is a famous brass to Sir Roger de Trumpington (1289). As Perpendicular examples the tower and spire of St Mary's, Whittlesey, and the wooden roof of Outwell church, may be selected. Monastic remains are scanty. Excluding the city of Cambridge there are no domestic buildings, either ancient or modern, of special note, with the exception of Sawston Hall, in the south of the county, a quadrangular mansion dated 1557–1584.

== Archaeology ==
In Spring 2018, a massive Romano-British coin hoard was discovered by a metal-detectorist in the town of Huntingdon. Designated as the Huntingdon "Muddy" Hoard, it is considered the largest coin hoard in the county, dating to 274 AD during the last days of the Gallic Empire, during the Crisis of the Third Century.

In February 2019, archaeologists from Mola Headland Infrastructure and experts from Highways England found evidence of first Iron Age beer dated back over 2,000 years during road works in Cambridgeshire.

"It’s a well-known fact that ancient populations used the beer-making process to purify water and create a safe source of hydration, but this is potentially the earliest physical evidence of that process taking place in the UK", said archaeologist Steve Sherlock.

== See also ==
- History of Northamptonshire for the Soke of Peterborough
- Timeline of Cambridge history
