= Pink Festival =

Diversity festival in England

Coordinates: 52°11′16″N 0°9′54″E

The Pink Festival is an open-air summer diversity event held in Cambridge, England, since 2003. The event is held on a Saturday in August. The event is open to the public, entry is free of charge. The event is independent from any council-run events.

== History ==
The Pink Festival's inception in 2003 was under the name the Pink Picnic, with subsequent annual events held in 2004, 2005 and 2006 under the name Pink Festival. There was no event in 2007 due to lack of funding and resources. The events from 2003 to 2010 have been held on a Saturday in August at Cherry Hinton Hall in Cambridge. Later, smaller events have also been held at other locations, including Cambridge Corn Exchange. The objective of the Pink Festival is to provide the only LGBT event in the East of England at which festival goers can celebrate the things that make us all different.

== Organisation ==
The Pink Festival is a registered charity no. 1163298.

The events are produced by team of unpaid volunteers throughout the year. The organisation is not intended to make any profit. Available funds are used to produce events and to support local LGBTQ+ charity organisations.

== Events ==
The Pink Festival was an open-air event with a number of marquees offering varied entertainment including live music, cabaret and comedy. Previous events have included a "Pink Games" arena for sporting activities. The last Pink Festival occurred in 2010, attracting around 10,000 attendees.

The Pink Festival organised Cambridgeshire's first Pride event that happened on the 8th of June 2019. Around 5,000 people turned up for the event, and the parade included punt boat float in the River Cam. There was no event held in 2020 due to the COVID-19 pandemic.

Fundraising events began taking place in November 2021, to help fund the return of Cambridge Pride in 2022. Anglia Ruskin University sponsored the event.
