= St John the Evangelist's Church, Cambridge =

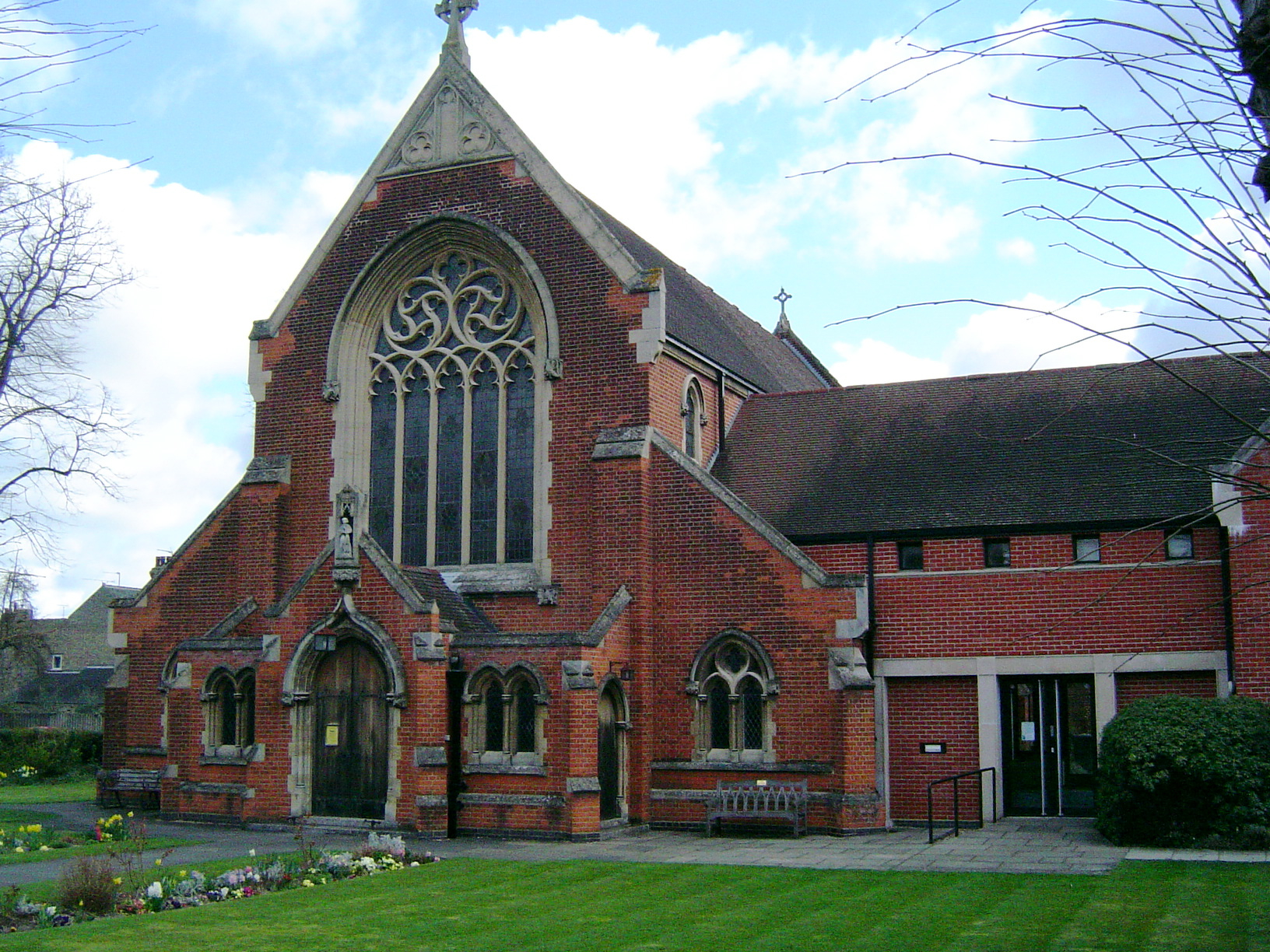
- View of the West end and entrance
- St John the Evangelist's Church, Cambridge
- 52.185292°N 0.138963°E
- Location: Hills Road, Cambridge, CB2 2RN
- Country: England
- Denomination: Church of England
- Churchmanship: Broad church/Central
- Website: Church website

History
- Status: Active

Architecture
- Functional status: Parish church
- Style: Victorian Gothic
- Completed: 1897

Administration
- Diocese: Diocese of Ely
- Archdeaconry: Archdeaconry of Cambridge
- Deanery: Cambridge South Deanery
- Parish: St. John the Evangelist, Cherry Hinton

St John the Evangelist's Church is a Church of England parish church located on the junction of Hills Road and Blinco Grove in Cambridge, Cambridgeshire.

In 2023, the vicar was the Revd James Shakespeare, who had served as curate at this church some years before.

== History ==
The church was founded in 1892 as a daughter church of St Andrew's Church, Cherry Hinton, to serve the developing residential area between Hills Road and Cherry Hinton Road. At first services were held in the chapel of Homerton College. The work to raise funds for a building was undertaken by a committee whose members were drawn from the local community and the University of Cambridge, under the chair of the Master of Peterhouse. In 1893 a retired clergyman, the Reverend John George, offered to serve as curate-in-change on a voluntary basis. He played a significant role in the project to build the new church and he and his wife donated the pulpit to mark their silver wedding anniversary. The first stage of the church building was made usable by the end of 1897 and John George became the first vicar that year, serving until 1903.

The west end of the church was completed in 1929 during the priesthood of Reverend Patterson Morgan (1927–1938). The choir and clergy vestries were built in 1909. A parish room was built on the south side of the church in 1982 (Canon Frederick Wilkinson, 1975–1988), and extended to form the community rooms and new entrance area in 1995 (Canon Brian Jones, 1989–1997).

== Vicars ==
- Rev John George (1897-1903)
- Reverend Love (1903–1914)
- Reverend Jackson (1914–1927)
- Reverend Patterson Morgan (1927–1938)
- Reverend Robert Jary (1938–1947)
- Reverend John Needham (1947–1955)
- Canon Frederick Stanbury (1956–1974)
- Canon Frederick Wilkinson (1975–1988)
- Canon Brian Jones (1989–1997)
- Canon David Reindorp (1997–2006)
- Canon Susan Wyatt (2006–2016)
- Revd James Shakespeare (2017–present)

== Notable people ==
Stephen Sykes, formerly Regius Professor of Divinity at the University of Cambridge and subsequently Bishop of Ely, served as curate at St John's from 1985 to 1990.

The Reverend Angela Tilby served as honorary priest from 1997–2006 until her appointment as vicar of St Benet's Church. She is well known for her work for BBC Radio Four, particularly as a regular contributor to Thought for the Day and the Morning Service.

Canon David Reindorp, a previous incumbent and now vicar of Chelsea Old Church, was the chaplain in the ITV series of reality television programmes Lads' Army and Bad Lads' Army.
