= Sancton Wood School =

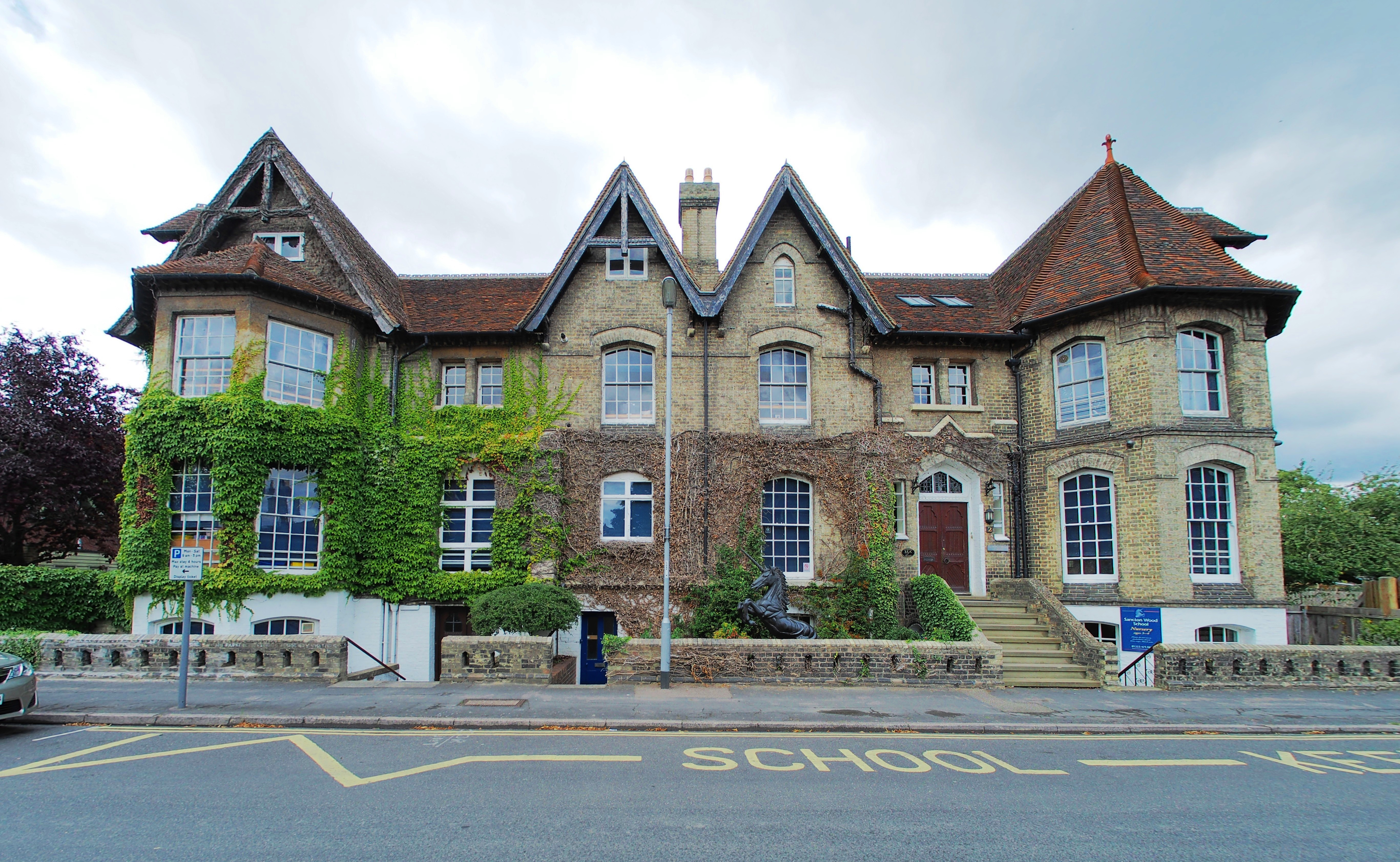

Location
- 2 St Paul's Road; Cambridge, Cambridgeshire, CB1 2EZ; England; 52.1982°N 0.13016°E

Information
- Type: Private day school
- Established: 1976
- Department for Education URN: 110921 Tables
- Head teacher: Richard Settle
- Gender: Mixed
- Age: 1 to 16
- Enrolment: 376 as of January 2021
- Website: www.sanctonwood.co.uk

Sancton Wood School is a mixed private day school for children aged 1 to 16 located in Cambridge, Cambridgeshire, England. The school was founded as an independent primary school in 1976 and opened a senior school department in 1979.

The school was owned by the Sturdy family who also own Cambridge International School and Holme Court School at Cherry Hinton Hall, a specialist school for children with dyslexia and related conditions. It was sold to Minerva Education in March 2014.
