= Nick Elliott =

Nicholas Raymond Elliott
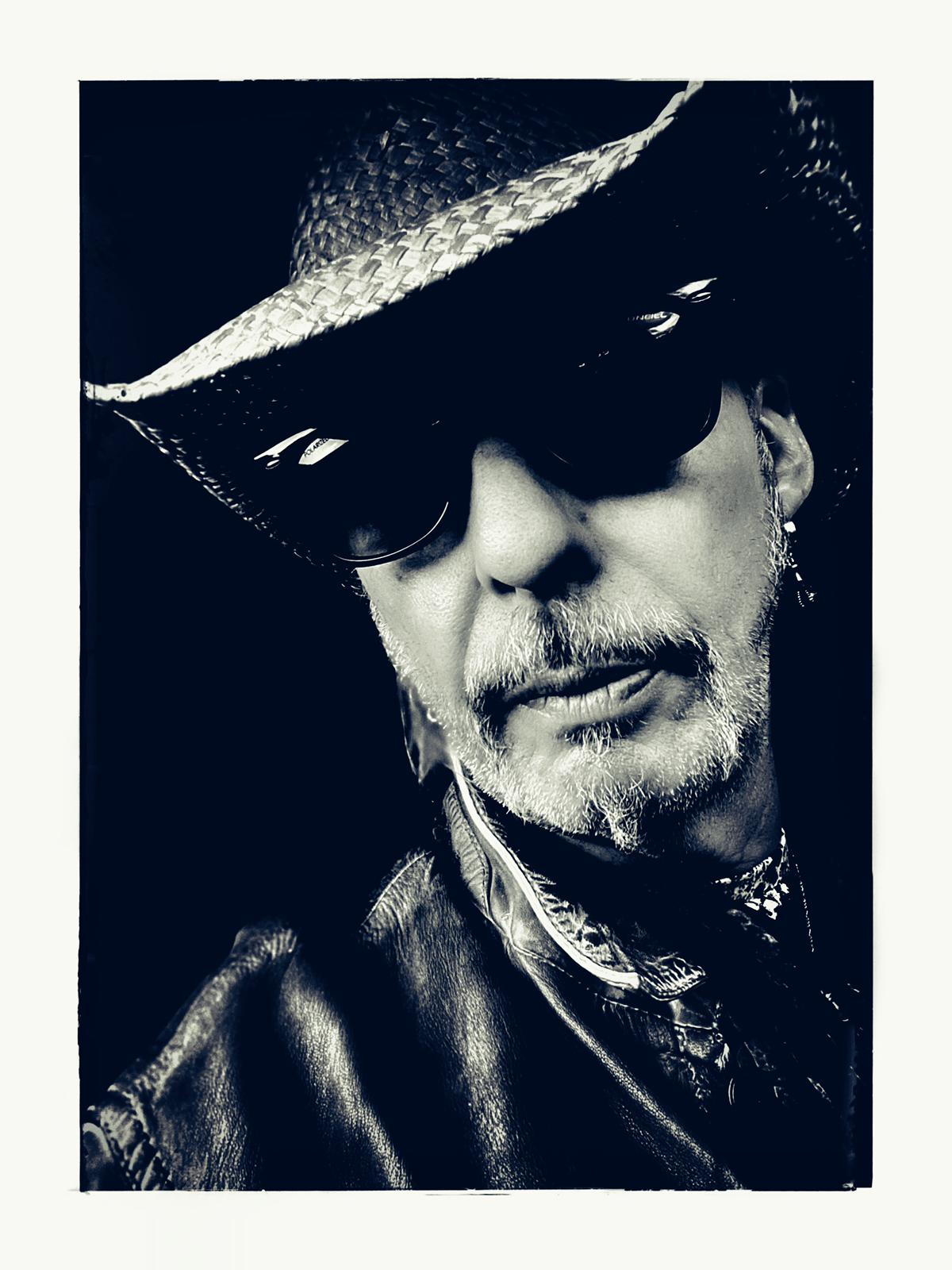
- Elliott in 2021
- Born: Nicholas Raymond Elliott; 8th November; Peterborough, United Kingdom
- Occupation: Photographer

Nicholas Raymond Elliott (born 8 November 1955, in Peterborough) is a British photographer.

== Biography ==
Elliott grew up in Stanground and joined East Midlands Allied Press (EMAP) working as an editorial photographer for Anglian Times, Motor Cycle News and Motor Cycle Racing.

After Elliott left EMAP he was commissioned by IPC for Truck Magazine, Car Magazine, and Auto Car. Elliott also worked with agencies Saatchi & Saatchi, Carlson, Young & Rubican, GGT, and Ogilvy & Mather.

TBWA commissioned Elliott to photograph the 1992 UK general election billboard for the Liberal Democrats. Elliott has photographed musicians and shot in Nashville, in 2010.

In 2011, Elliott released a book, TEN-A Decade In Images, using images from the Cambridge Folk Festival. Elliott published a follow-up, 50Folk, to celebrate 50 years of the festival, in 2014. He released Three Weeks One Summer documenting The Marmalade a year later and a fourth book, Ice Cream & Sun Cream, in 2017.
