= Boult Wade Tennant =

European Intellectual Property firm

Boult Wade Tennant LLP
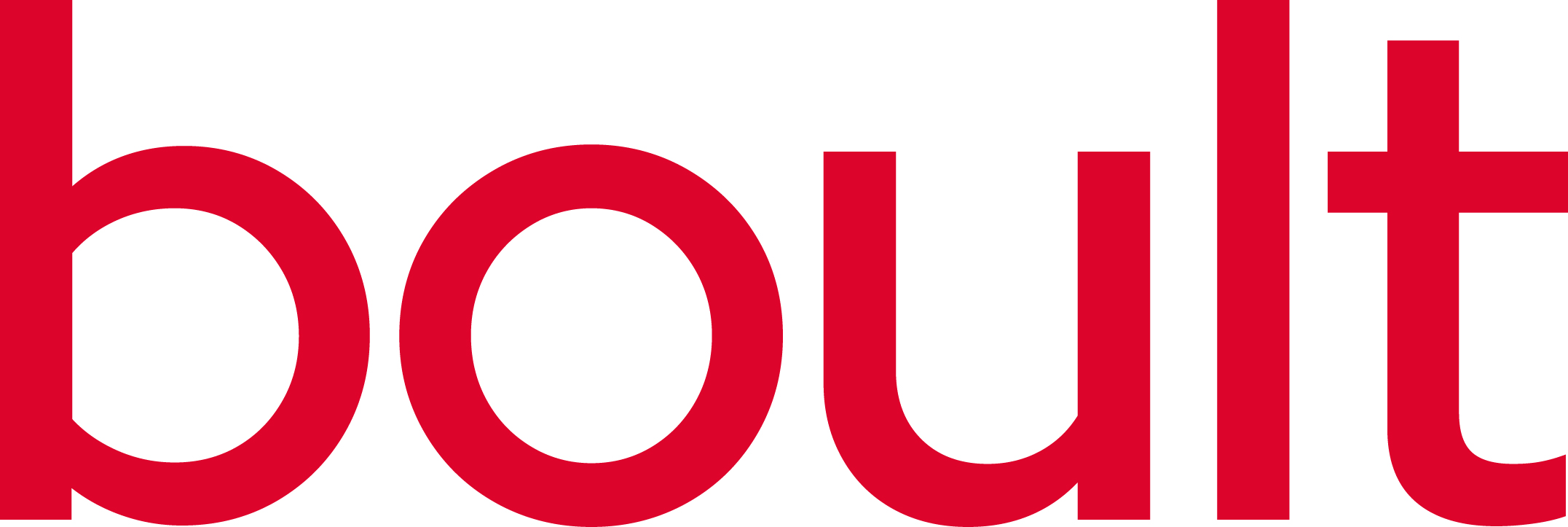
- Headquarters: London
- No. of offices: 6
- Offices: London, Frankfurt, Madrid, Munich, Cambridge and Reading.
- Major practice areas: Intellectual property, Legal advice
- Date founded: 1894
- Company type: Limited Liability Partnership
- Website: www.boult.com

Boult Wade Tennant LLP is a European Intellectual Property firm headquartered in London. Founded in 1894, it specialises in patent, trademark, and design protection, providing legal services to multinational corporations, SMEs, and public sector entities. The firm operates six offices across the United Kingdom, Germany, and Spain, with a strong presence before European and international intellectual property authorities, including the European Patent Office (EPO) and the UK Intellectual Property Office (UKIPO).

As of 2020, Boult Wade Tennant had six offices across three European countries. The firm was founded and remains headquartered in London. Boult Wade S.L. was established in 2018 and has an office in Madrid. Branch offices of Boult Wade Tennant LLP have also opened in Frankfurt and Munich, Germany.

The firm is consistently recognised in tier one in the UK by legal directories including: Chambers & Partners, Legal 500, Managing Intellectual Property, IAM Patent 1000 and WTR 1000.

In 2025, the firm was ranked as one of the leading patent law firms in Europe by Financial Times.

== History ==
Boult Wade Tennant was founded by Alfred Julius Boult (1848–1932) in 1894. Boult became a partner in the firm of Messrs. W. P. Thompson and Boult of 63 Long-Row West Nottingham in 1881.

After taking over the debts and accounts of W. P. Thompson in 1894 Boult reconstituted the firm as Boult and Wade at 323 High Holborn London. Along with Boult, Wade was a member of the Institute of Patent Agents and procured patents and trade marks in all countries.

The firm changed its name to Boult, Wade, and Kilburn in 1899 when Bertram Kilburn joined as a partner. Following the departure of Kilburn, who set up his own practice in 1906, the firm again changed its name to the present form Boult, Wade, Tennant with the addition of William John Tennant (1866–1951).

== Services ==
The services the firm offers include: IP prosecution, enforcing and defending rights, dispute resolution, strategy, due diligence and valuation, portfolio management and brand management, brand selection, searching, watching and renewal services.

The firm's IP specialists advise multinational corporations, SMEs, governments, public sector and start-ups to ensure that inventions, brands and designs are protected. They are leading experts in acting in matters before the European Patent Office (EPO), the UKIPO (UK Intellectual Property Office) and EUIPO (European Union Intellectual Property Office), the World Intellectual Property Organisation (WIPO), the German Patent and Trade Mark Office (DPMA), the German courts, the Spanish Patent and Trademark Office (SPTO), the Spanish Civil and Commercial Courts, and similarly at the General Court, CJEU and before foreign registries.

The firm's experts advise across a wide range of sectors including: aerospace, artificial intelligence and machine learning, automotive, biotech, chemicals, communications and networks, computing and software, consumer goods and retail, electronics and electrical devices, energy and green technologies, food and beverage, industrial manufacture and processing, materials, medical devices and diagnostics, pharmaceuticals and trade marks.

== Notable cases ==
In 1895, Boult and Wade researched and cased a watermarking improvement as a novel invention by inventor W. K. Trotman. The patent was worth £20,000 in cash and £30,000 in fully paid up ordinary shares of £1.00 each an extraordinary sum for the time.

In 1896, the firm aided in the patency of tyres for the automobile industry by the Dunlop Pneumatic Tyre Company. John Boyd Dunlop, being the inventor of the first pneumatic tyre In 1888, discovering the pneumatic tyre principle and revolutionising the automotive industry.

In 1898, Boult and Wade patented an improvement in needles for the manufacture of felted fabrics.

In 1913, Boult, Wade and Tennant performed a search of patents to similar patents to the invention by Mr Lamplough, a way of cracking oil during the process of motor spirit production. The Lamplough is now one of the chief processes for the efficient commercial production of motor spirit from creosote and shale.

In 1926, the firm worked with John Logie Baird in acquiring patents to commercially develop the Baird Television. The firm created covering letters, patents, and protection for the Baird System of television to enable vision of living and moving beings... to be transmitted by wireless and land wire. In a report received from Messrs Boult, Wade and Tennant, they stated:

"We have the pleasure in certifying that twenty-nine patents and applications for patents have been filed in this country in connection with the Baird System of television."

In 1954, Boult, Wade and Tennant corresponded with the Universal Brewery Equipment Ltd in their design of metal containers used for storing, transporting, and dispensing beer. This consisted of specification and technical drawings.
