= West Pit =

Nature reserve in Cambridgeshire, England

Coordinates: 52.182°N 0.169°E

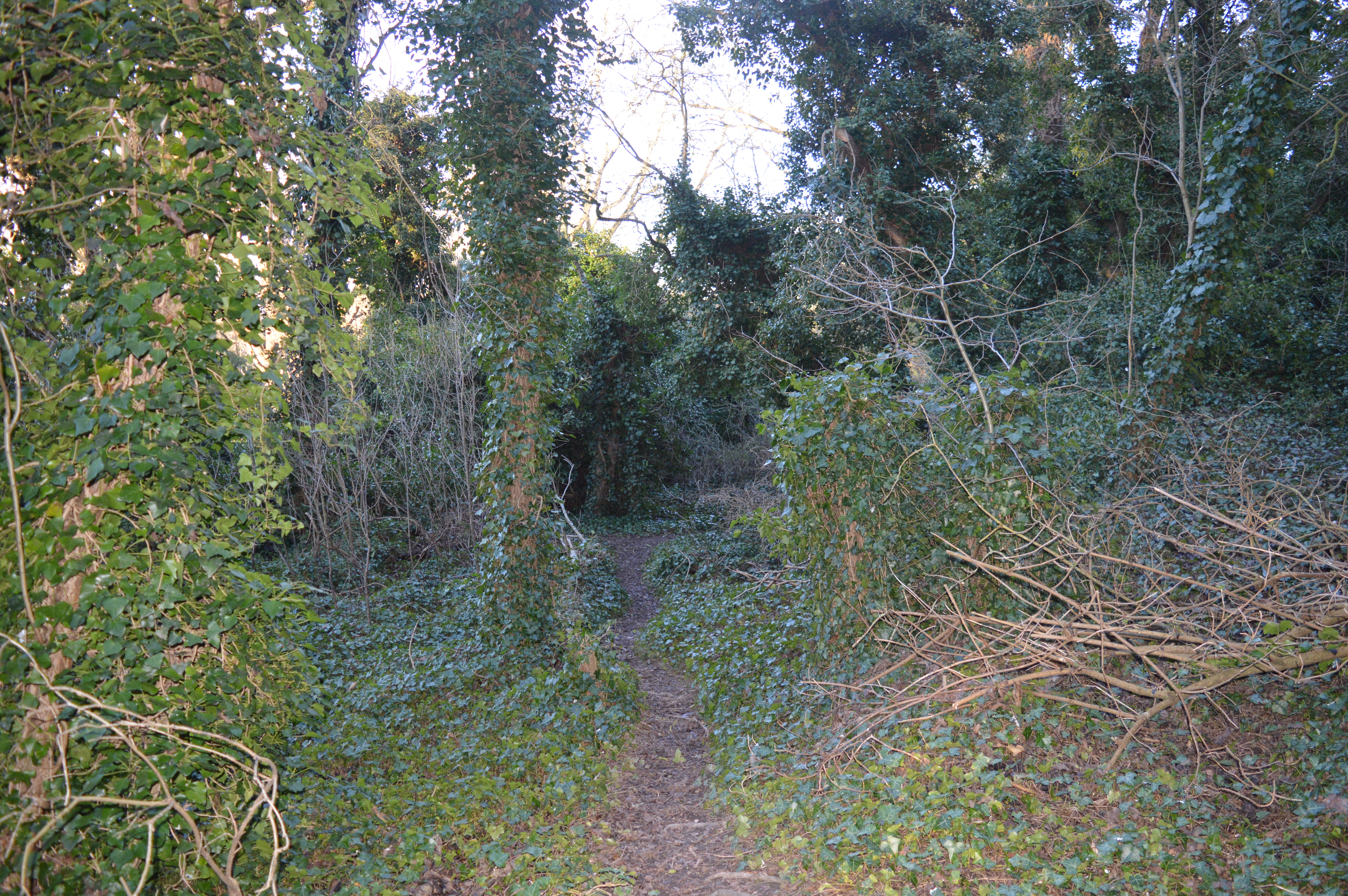
- Interactive map of West Pit
- Type: Local Nature Reserve
- Location: Cherry Hinton, Cambridgeshire
- OS grid: TL 484 558
- Area: 4.3 hectares (11 acres)
- Manager: Cambridge City Council

West Pit is a 4.3 hectare Local Nature Reserve in Cherry Hinton, on the south-eastern outskirts of Cambridge. It is part of the Cherry Hinton Pit biological Site of Special Scientific Interest (SSSI), which includes the neighbouring East Pit.

This former chalk quarry is now steeply sloping woodland with a caravan park in the centre. The woodland has been designated an SSSI due to the presence of a plant on the British Red List of Threatened Species, the moon carrot.

The site has been designated a Local Nature Reserve (LNR) by Cambridge City Council, which shows it as one LNR and East Pit and Limekiln Close as another LNR. However, the LNRs are confused on the Natural England website. One is shown as Limekiln Close and West Pit on the details page, but the map only covers Limekiln Close. The other LNR is shown on the details page as East Pit, whereas the map covers both East and West Pits.

There is access to the site from the entrance to the caravan park on Limekiln Road.
