= Angela Tilby =

Anglican priest and theologian

The Reverend Canon Angela Tilby
- Born: Angela Clare Wyatt Tilby; 6 March 1950 (age 76)
- Education: Girton College, Cambridge; Cranmer Hall, Durham

Ecclesiastical career
- Church: Church of England
- Ordained: 1997 (deacon); 1998 (priest)
- Congregations: St John the Evangelist's Church, Cambridge; St Bene't's Church, Cambridge; Christ Church Cathedral, Oxford

Angela Clare Wyatt Tilby (born 6 March 1950) is a British Anglican priest, author and former producer. She began her career working as a producer within the BBC's Religious Department. She was then ordained in the Church of England, and was a parish priest in the Diocese of Ely alongside working at Westcott House, a theological college in Cambridge, and as a lecturer with the Cambridge Theological Federation. She moved to Oxford where she was a Canon of Christ Church Cathedral, Oxford (2011–2016). In retirement, she is canon emeritus of Christ Church Cathedral, and a chaplain and honorary canon at Portsmouth Cathedral.

== Early life and education ==
Tilby was born on 6 March 1950. She was educated at North London Collegiate School, an all-girls private school in London. She studied at Girton College, Cambridge, where she was a student chapel warden. She graduated from the University of Cambridge with a Bachelor of Arts (BA) degree in 1972: as per tradition, her BA was promoted to a Master of Arts (MA Cantab) degree in 1976. Later, she trained for ordained ministry at Cranmer Hall, Durham, an evangelical Anglican theological college.

== Career ==
=== BBC and journalism ===
Before ordination Tilby spent 22 years as a producer within the BBC's Religious Department. She has made regular appearances on television and radio, including Thought for the Day on BBC Radio Four. She has also appeared on The Brains Trust when the programme was presented by Joan Bakewell. In February 2013, Tilby began writing a regular column for the Church Times.

=== Ordained ministry ===
Tilby was ordained in the Church of England as a deacon in 1997 and as a priest in 1998. From 1997 to 2006, she served as honorary priest of St John the Evangelist's Church, Cambridge. During this time she also worked at Westcott House, Cambridge, a liberal Anglo-Catholic theological college, as a tutor (1997–2007) and as its Vice-Principal (2001–2006); and as a lecturer in spirituality and early church history with the Cambridge Theological Federation (1997–2011). Then, from 2007 to 2011, she was Vicar of St Bene't's Church in Cambridge. In 2011, she moved to Oxford where she had been appointed Diocesan Canon of Christ Church Cathedral, Oxford and continuing ministerial development advisor for the Diocese of Oxford.

Tilby retired from full-time ministry in 2016 and was appointed canon emeritus of Christ Church Cathedral. She has held permission to officiate in the Diocese of Portsmouth since 2016: she has been an honorary chaplain of Portsmouth Cathedral since 2018, and honorary canon of the cathedral since 2019.

At a service at St Paul's Cathedral in 2004, recognizing 10 years of women in the priesthood, Tilby's sermon stated that "Women priests have not unhinged the church." Anthony Howard in an opinion piece in The Times stated that the sermon showed that Tilby "is the equal of, if not the superior to, most men currently sitting on the episcopal bench."

She has written a number of books. Son of God was described by the Birmingham Post as having "rather too much speculation and not enough hard fact in Tilby's account it is still an engrossing read".

== Selected works ==
- Tilby, Angela (2002). Son of God. London: Hodder & Stoughton. ISBN 978-0340786468.
- Tilby, Angela (2006). Let there be light: praying with Genesis. London: Darton, Longman and Todd. ISBN 978-0232526738.
- Tilby, Angela (2007). Everyday prayer: a little office book. England: SPCK. ISBN 978-0281058785.
- Tilby, Angela (2009). The seven deadly sins: their origin in the spiritual teaching of Evagrius the Hermit. London: SPCK. ISBN 978-0281056323.
- Tilby, Angela (2013). Soul: god, self and new cosmology. New York: Doubleday. ISBN 978-0385511254.
