= Cambridge Folk Festival =

Annual music festival in Cambridge, England

Coordinates: 52°11′9.09″N 0°9′47.76″E

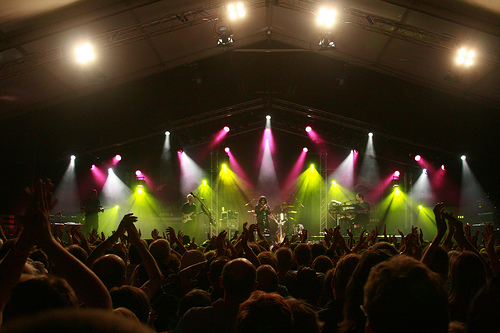
- The 2008 festival
- Genre: Folk music
- Locations: Cambridge, England
- Years active: 1965–present
- Website: www.cambridgelive.org.uk/folk-festival/

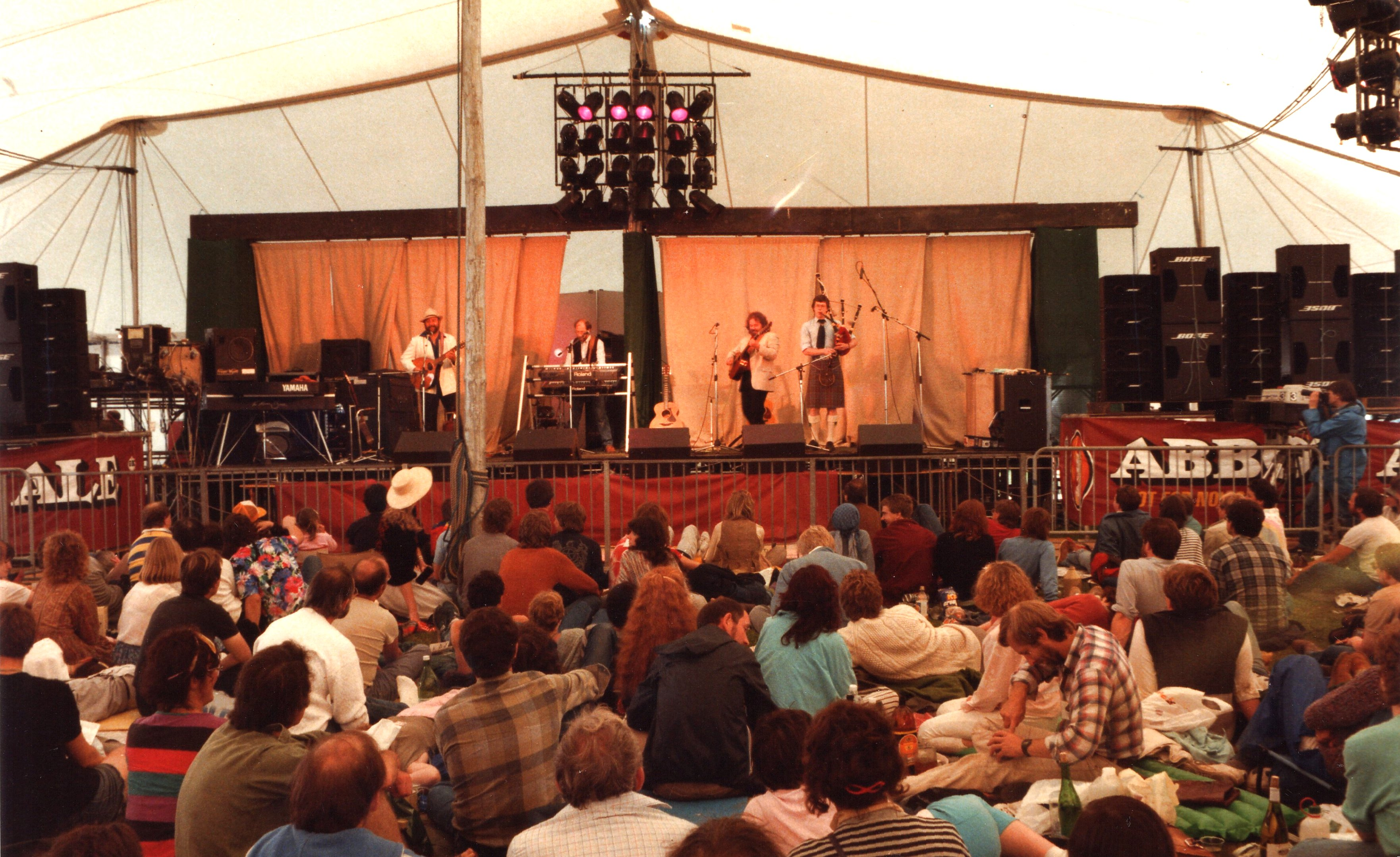
Scene at the 1985 Festival, with the Battlefield Band on stage

The Cambridge Folk Festival is an annual music festival, established in 1965, held in the grounds of Cherry Hinton Hall in Cherry Hinton, one of the villages subsumed by the city of Cambridge, England. The festival is known for its eclectic mix of music and a wide definition of what might be considered folk. It occurs over a long weekend (3½ days) in summer at Cherry Hinton Hall. Until 2008 it was sponsored by BBC Radio 2, which broadcast it live, with highlights were recorded and shown later and occasionally live on digital television channel BBC Four from 2002 to 2009 and from 2010 to 2012 on Sky Arts.

== History ==
Recent histories have obscured the early origins of the folk festival. Ken Woollard's 1974 Ten years of folk: A history of the Cambridge Folk Festival mentions three councillors who had an idea for a festival (but does not name them).

Ken Woollard was the first director of the Cambridge Folk Festival in 1965, and continued to work as Festival Organiser and Artistic Director up until his death in 1993. This role was then taken up by Eddie Barcan, who had worked as Ken's assistant from 1990. Eddie Barcan was replaced by Rebecca Stewart in 2015

Laing and Newman's 1994 book Thirty Years of the Cambridge Folk Festival (based in part on conversations with Ken Woollard) acknowledges the three councillors and names them on part of the first page that covers the setting up of festival. These key figures responsible for setting up and founding the Cambridge Folk festival are named as Paul Rayment, Philip Abrams and George Scurfield.

The role of Paul Rayment (1933–2013) is particularly relevant in the origins and establishment of the Cambridge folk festival (in the context of left wing 1960s political developments).

The setting up took about nine months and was developed by Paul Rayment, Philip Abrams and George Scurfield before Ken Woollard was asked to run the festival. In the 1960s the Rayments, Sharkeys, Scurfields and Woollards were all associated with Cambridge Labour Party and the folk club to greater or lesser extents. Jack Sharkey had the original idea which may have been linked to Jazz on a Summer's Day (1958), the documentary film set at the 1958 Newport Jazz Festival in Rhode Island, and he involved Paul Rayment. Jack Sharkey also had the idea to hold the festival at Cherry Hinton Hall, and his engagement with folk music was instrumental to the original initiative.

Paul Rayment's initiative, drive, commitment and political skill produced the folk festival. In his role as a councillor, he suggested the festival site of Cherry Hinton, managed the electrics of the first festival and volunteered to stay the night in the marquee for the first festival; there was no security. The other key figures who developed the festival were Philip Abrams, a professor of sociology who saw it as a social initiative, and George Scurfield, an author, poet, and politician, whose abilities and sense of adventure and were vital to the establishment of the festival. The 1965 festival was the fruit of a Labour-dominant council in a traditionally conservative area and particularly the endeavours of Paul Rayment. The founding of the Cambridge Folk festival reflects its subsequent diversity when a war hero poet and politician worked with an eminent sociologist and a politically-driven electrician (brought up in a children's home) to bring something together representative of the 1960s zeitgeist in Cambridge. This was then handed over and brought to fruition by Ken Woollard, a local firefighter and socialist political activist, to help organise it.

The first festival sold 1400 tickets and almost broke even. Squeezed in as a late addition to the bill was a young Paul Simon who had just released "I Am A Rock". The festival's popularity quickly grew. Woollard continued as Festival organiser and artistic director up until his death in 1993. In 2014 the festival celebrated its 50th event, including artists such as Van Morrison and Sinéad O'Connor. Until 2015 it was run by Cambridge City Council. It was briefly run by a charity called Cambridge Live. In 2019 it was once again taken over by Cambridge City Council.

The 2024 festival lost £320,000, and in January 2025 it was announced that the 2025 festival, which would have been the 60th anniversary, was cancelled; Cambridge City Council said the funds would be used to "explore new opportunities" for the 2026 festival.

== Current structure ==
Most artists perform more than once over the weekend on the different stages: Stage 1, within a large marquee in front of the main Festival arena; Stage 2, a smaller marquee; a Floor Singers stage at the Coldham's Common camp site; and the Club Tent, hosted up to 2022 on the Festival's behalf by five local folk clubs, who programmed local artists. From 2023, this longstanding practice was discontinued, and the Festival rebranded the Club Tent as a third stage. There is a small tent called The Hub where young people can practise together or attend workshop sessions. In addition, there is a small marquee in the Flower Garden, which hosts workshops which vary from year to year. Regular fixtures have been the storytelling workshop and, since 2011, the Northumbrian smallpipes workshops run by the band Camus, where festival-goers can try their hand on practice sets of pipes. Elsewhere around the site, local musicians are invited by the festival to provide informal sessions, a regular favourite being the Irish sessions.

== Artists ==
Major figures from the folk world have appeared at the festival, including Martin Carthy, Shirley Collins, Peggy Seeger, Sean Taylor and John Tams. Recent festivals have also seen other important traditional musicians such as Kathryn Tickell, Kate Rusby, Eliza Carthy, and The Unthanks. Across a wider range of genres have been performances from Judy Collins, Graham Nash, Chumbawamba, Joe Strummer and The Mescaleros and Levellers. 2006's line up included Emmylou Harris, Cara Dillon and Seth Lakeman. Artists such as Frank Turner, Mumford & Sons, Laura Marling, Old Crow Medicine Show, Idlewild, Jake Bugg and The Bar-Steward Sons of Val Doonican have also all played at Cambridge in recent years. In celebration of the 50th festival Delphonic Music released a digital audio album featuring tracks from 50 different artists, including Joan Baez, The Proclaimers, Fairport Convention and Loudon Wainwright III.

In 2015, Joan Baez, Joan Armatrading, Wilko Johnson, and Passenger headlined the festival.

Rhiannon Giddens was selected as the second guest curator of the 2018 Cambridge Folk Festival. In 2018, it was announced that Cambridge-born singer Nick Mulvey would be a guest curator for the 2019 festival, selecting five artists for the line-up.

== Releases ==
In 2007 a double album was released Cool As Folk: Cambridge Folk Festival, with live recordings by Altan, Kate Rusby, Beth Orton, Martin Simpson, Eliza Carthy, Joan Baez and many others.

In 2011, specialist music book publisher Rufus Stone released a limited edition book by rock art photographer Nick Elliott entitled TEN – A Decade in Images. The book features images taken at the festival by Elliott between 2000–2010 and was endorsed by the organisers. It includes quotes from some of the musicians featured in its pages such as Richard Hawley, Julie Fowlis, Sharon Shannon, and Cara Dillon as well as BBC radio presenters Mark Radcliffe and Mike Harding. Elliott released a follow-up book, 50Folk, in 2014 as a personal celebration of 50 years of the festival.
