= Cherry Hinton =

Suburb of Cambridge, England

Coordinates: 52.1849°N 0.1760°E

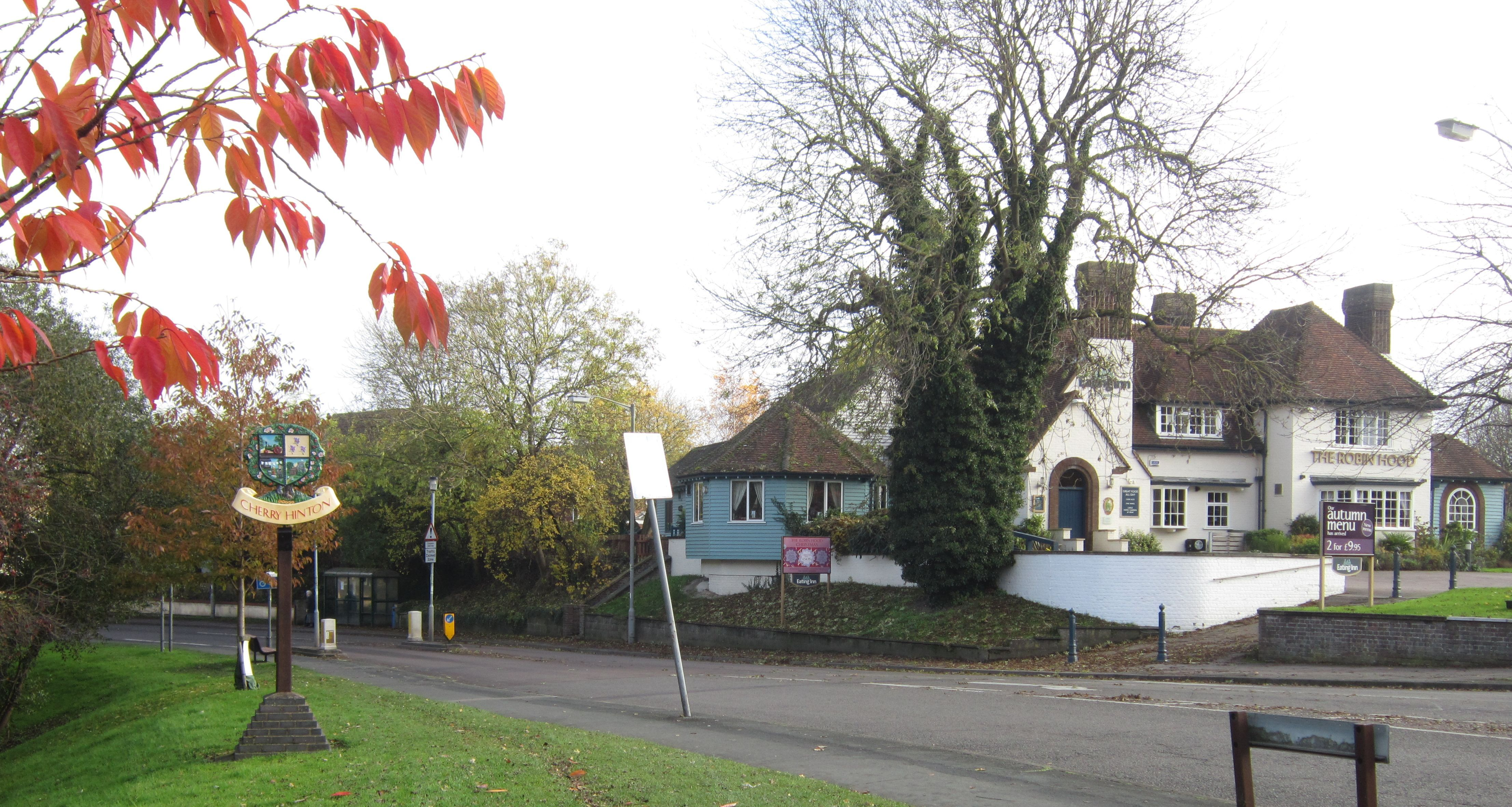
- Village entrance

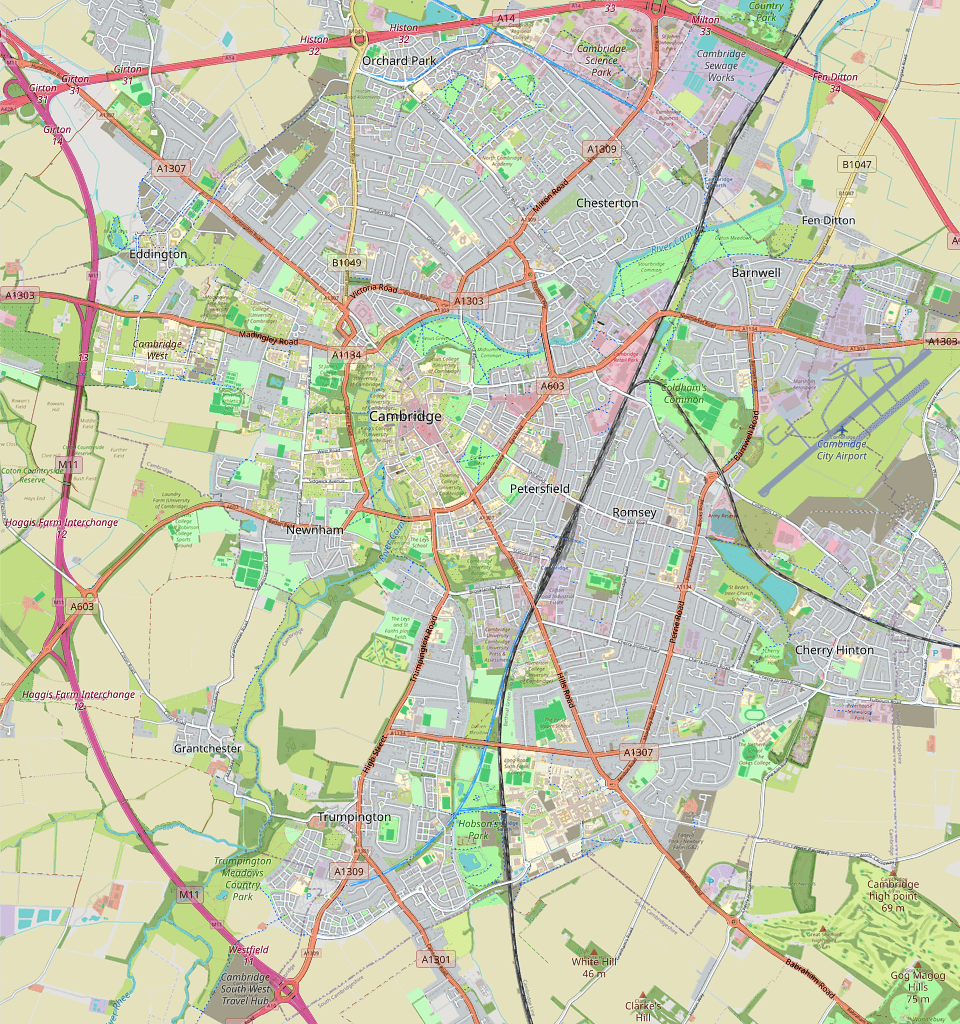
- Location within Cambridgeshire
- Population: 9,343
- OS grid reference: TL487563
- District: Cambridge
- Shire county: Cambridgeshire
- Region: East
- Country: England
- Sovereign state: United Kingdom
- Post town: CAMBRIDGE
- Postcode district: CB1
- Dialling code: 01223
- Police: Cambridgeshire
- Fire: Cambridgeshire
- Ambulance: East of England
- UK Parliament: South Cambridgeshire

Cherry Hinton is a village and electoral ward in Cambridge, in the county of Cambridgeshire, England. As of the 2021 UK census, the ward's population was 9,343 people.

== History ==
The rectangular parish of Cherry Hinton occupies the western corner of Flendish hundred on the south-eastern outskirts of the city of Cambridge. (See Hundreds of Cambridgeshire.) In 1931 the parish had a population of 1254. On 1 April 1934 the parish was abolished and merged with Cambridge.

Pictures and a description of St Andrew's parish church appear at the Cambridgeshire Churches website.

There is an entry relating to Cherry Hinton in the Domesday Book: "Hintone: Count Alan. 4 mills." (Alan Rufus ‘Alan the Red', one of the Counts of Brittany, confiscated Hinton Manor from Edith, the (so-called “common law”) first wife of Harold II of England — Edith Swanneck: 'Eddeva The Fair')

The War Ditches are the remains of an Iron Age hill fort (55 metres in diameter), now mostly lost to quarrying. (See Cherry Hinton Pit)

== Geography ==
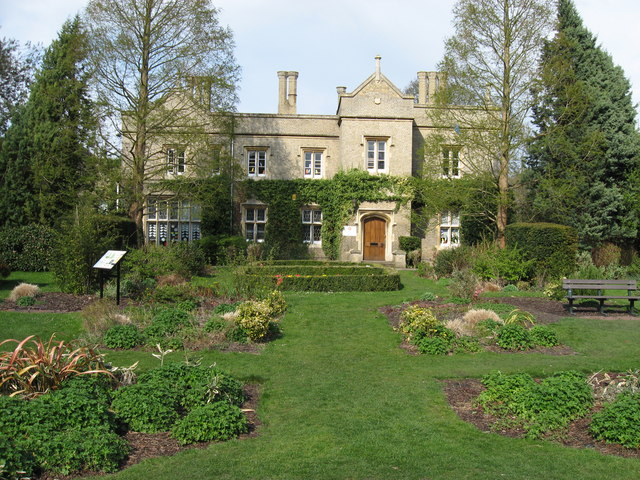
The front of Cherry Hinton Hall

Cherry Hinton lies about 3 miles (4.8 km) southeast of Cambridge city centre, and falls mostly within the Cambridge City boundary but is geographically separated from it by the grounds of Cherry Hinton Hall, the airfield and the flooded chalk pits. The village itself is fairly compact. North of the village is Cambridge Airport; to the East is Fulbourn; to the South is Cherry Hinton Pit, a nature reserve formed from old chalk pits and then the Gog Magog Hills which rise to 75 metres. Outside the residential area the land is open farmland, with relatively few trees.

== Demography ==
Substantial housing estates, both local authority and private have been built in the village over the last 50 years. Housing is typically suburban with 2,200 people per square kilometre; 40% of housing being semi-detached and 60% being owner-occupied.

In 2001 the population of the village was made up of 1,600 people under 16, 4,950 aged 16 to 59, and 1,750 over 60.

In 2021 the population of the Ward was made up of 2017 people under 18, 5872 aged 18 to 64, and 1451 people over 64, for a total 9343. However, the Ward excluded (at that time) the part of the village East of the old City Boundary. The remaining area accounts for around 3500 people although ONS zones don't align with the village boundary (the LSOAs include Teversham and Fulbourn).

== Community ==
The village has a good community, based around several organisations:

St Andrew's Church, Cherry Hinton is an Anglican church which practices a creative Catholic style. The vicar is Revd Dr Karin Voth Harman, who was Priest in Charge from 2016 to April 2021 when she was ordained Vicar. The church runs a youth café, meditation space, toddler group, a choir and a food hub alongside normal church services. The building itself is very old, the original records date from 1201 and parts of the current tower are believed to be at least 900 years old. The chancel dates from the 13th Century while the fine carved rood screen dates from the 15th Century.

The Baptist Chapel is on Fisher's Lane, and was created by a baptist community starting in 1843. They built an initial small chapel in 1870 which was then rebuilt into the current chapel in 1883. The Pastor is Nic Boyns, who took over from Rev. Paul Goddard in a multi-year handover period. The church runs a community choir, a Friday friends group for the retired, children's activities, a café and works with Hope into Action by maintaining a Hope house. In the Summer a Holiday Bible Club offers a host of activities for young people, while the refugees aid bank has helped many Ukrainian refugees get back on their feet.

The Plymouth Brethren have a small group in the village.

The Church of the Latter-Day Saints have a large building at the southern end of the village.

There is a library in the centre, which reopened as the Community Hub in 2025 with more facilities.

The village has several clubs and Societies, including:

- a youth football team
- a bellringing group
- a local history group
- an army cadet force
- the local history society
- the Friends of Cherry Hinton Brook
- the Friends of Cherry Hinton Hall

== Economy ==
In common with changes in the post-war years many of the residents in employment work outside the village, in Cambridge and elsewhere. There are small industrial units scattered throughout the area, together with a thriving high-street with a selection of shops and small businesses. Marshall Aerospace, the aircraft maintenance company and owners of Cambridge Airport, to the north was a major employer in recent decades.

In 2001 the economically active population was estimated at 4,186 (70% of the population aged 16 to 74). Unemployment was given as 2.4%.

The village has three business areas: an industrial estate at the end of Coldham's Lane (between that and Church Lane) at the northern end, the High Street, and the Peterhouse Business park on the South-Eastern edge. The former site includes Travis Perkins, Inca Digital, Semitool, Storage King, and Carl Zeiss. The Peterhouse park includes the head office of the world-famous ARM processor designer and the head office of Cambridge Water. Lastly, Fulbourn Hospital (though not strictly within the village borders) has been redeveloped as the Capital Park technology park, and houses many smaller companies, with offices of Illumina, Staffords, Syngeta, i2, Cambridge Light Technology, Boult Wade Tennant, Scientia, Ware Anthony Rust, and others.

== Transport ==
There are sufficient road links to Cambridge and the surrounding area; nearly 60% of the population travel to work by motorised vehicle and 25% travel to work by foot or bicycle; it takes 20 minutes to cycle into the centre of Cambridge at a moderate pace, 15 minutes to the railway station.

Cherry Hinton High Street has a long-standing traffic calming system consisting of a series of chicanes, traffic islands and mini roundabouts. Drivers seeking a through route can use Yarrow Road (around the eastern edge) instead.

There is a railway through the village but no extant station; the nearest railway stations are Cambridge itself (3 miles to the west), Cambridge North and Waterbeach (both ~7 miles to the North), Shelford (3 miles to the south), and Dullingham (10 miles to the east). From Cambridge there are regular services to London Kings Cross, London Liverpool Street, Brighton via London St Pancras, King's Lynn (via Ely), Norwich (via Ely, and via Stowmarket), Ipswich (through Newmarket), and Peterborough (via Ely). Until the 1960s there was Fulbourne railway station at the far end of Fulbourn Village. In the 1850s, Cherryhinton railway station existed for a couple of years.

=== Cycle and footpaths ===
Three non-road paths can be used to avoid motor traffic for part of these journeys. Daws Lane is a track leading from Sidney Farm Road to Snakey Path at a small bridge over Cherry Hinton Brook. Snakey path heads west beside the brook until it reaches Burnside, which leads to Mill Road, and the path then continues on to the Sainsbury's site. Raised about 3' (1m) above water level the path is frequently used by cyclists and walkers. On the north side of the Brook two of the flooded chalk pits are clearly visible.

Another path, known as "The Tins", runs on the north side of the flooded chalk pits. It starts in Railway Street, cutting across Orchard Estate (where few houses still have the corrugated iron fences that give this path its name). Passing in front of David Lloyd, the Holiday Inn and Norman Way it then passes over the railway on an old iron footbridge, which may be replaced with a new one under cycle path proposals by the city council. On the right it passes the Territorial Army centre and then meets Burnside somewhat closer to Mill Road than Snakey path, at the White Bridge.

Another path runs from the East end of Railway Street, East alongside the railway line to the North side of the Yarrow Road level crossing, which continues on the other side of the crossing beside Tesco's car park and on towards Fulbourn, where it joins the remnant of Fulbourn Old Drift. However, some travellers may prefer one of the side roads such as Fulbourn Old Drift (West) because this path tends to get overgrown and muddy.

There are also link-paths, connecting the east end of the Colville Estate at Primrose Way to the Teasel Estate at Lucerne Close, enabling pedestrian and cycle access from the High Street directly East (while that cars have to go around the village edge). Another path links the junction of Daws Lane and Snakey Path (mentioned above) to Cherry Hinton Hall and onwards to Walpole Road, which has on-road cycle paths.

There is also cycle path provision on various roads in the area, notably High Street, Cherry Hinton Road (linking with Hills Road), Fulbourn Road, Teversham Road, and Airport Way.

A notable exception is Coldham's Lane, which is narrow for most of its length and even pedestrian use is not pleasant because of the high traffic levels.

=== Buses ===
Citi 1 bus from Fulbourn to Arbury and the Citi 3 bus from Yarrow Road Tesco to Whitehill Estate/Fison Road combine for a frequency of a bus into the centre every 5 minutes, with an average journey time of approximately 20 minutes. Both services stop at the railway station and the Citi 1 additionally serves Addenbrooke's Hospital. A less frequent service (Citi 16/17) runs from St Andrew's Church at the end of Coldham's Lane to the Beehive Retail Park and into town.

== Public services ==
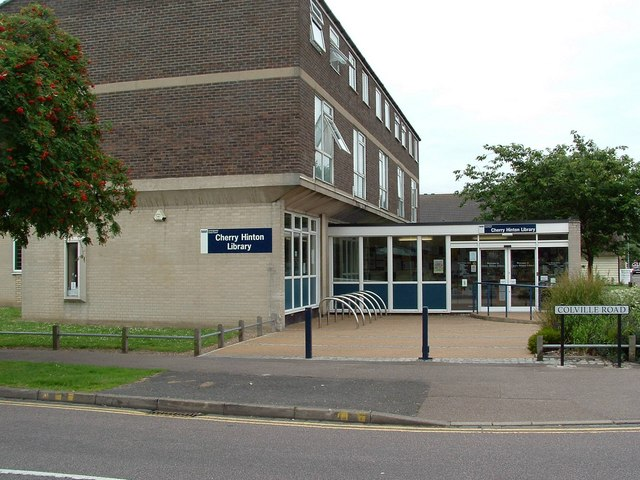
Cherry Hinton Library

There are two NHS GP surgeries in the village, one of which (the Cherry Hinton Medical Centre) has a practice shared with Brookfields Health Centre on Seymour Street, Cambridge, the other (Cherry Hinton Surgery on High Street) is shared with "The Surgery" of Mill Road. There is also a private Osteopath's practice on the High Street.

In the High Street there are a number of shops including a Tesco Express supermarket, a Morrison's express, Children's society charity shop, a Sue Ryder charity shop, a barber, a hairdresser, Dorrington's Bakery, two pharmacies, a craft shop, two Indian restaurants, a dry cleaners, two Indian market/food shops, two turf accountants and a post office.

There is a village hall and sports leisure centre (Cherry Hinton Village Leisure Centre) adjacent to the village library, with services currently operated on behalf of the City Council. The sports centre offers badminton, 5-a-side football, basketball as well as exercise classes and room hire. The village has a well-appointed recreation ground situated on the high street. Here children's play equipment, exercise equipment and football fields for local fixtures are provided. The village also has a park and children's play area, (including a large paddling pool and two tennis courts) in the grounds of Cherry Hinton Hall, which also hosts the internationally recognised annual Cambridge Folk Festival in July.

Cherry Hinton mostly falls within the jurisdiction of Cambridgeshire County Council for Local Government Services although the easternmost parts are managed by South Cambs District Council. Recent parliamentary boundary changes place most of the village in South Cambs parliamentary constituency, changing a decades-long association with the city.

== Schools ==
Cherry Hinton C of E Primary School is situated on the High Street just next to the level crossing and near to St Andrew's church. In September 2011, the school changed from an Infant School for children aged between 3 and 7 years to a Primary School for 3- to 11-year-old children. It is a Church School, founded by Trust Deed, and has 'Foundation' Governors, appointed by the Church of England. The school has been rated grade 2 ("good") school.

Colville Primary School is situated on Colville Road. It opened in the mid-1950s as a Junior School for 7–11 year-olds. Mary Waters, mother of Pink Floyd bass guitarist and lyricist Roger Waters, taught there during the 1960s and early 1970s.

Other primary schools, opened after the two above, include The Spinney Primary School, close to the village centre, and Bewick Bridge Community Primary School.

Secondary schooling for most children is at Netherhall School to the south west (in Queen Ediths), or alternatively at St Bede's Inter-Church School just outside the village to the west (nearer the city).

Independent schools in the village area include Oaks International School and Holme Court School.

== Cultural references ==
Cherry Hinton Hall hosts the internationally recognised annual Cambridge Folk Festival in July.

Fulbourn Hospital, to the East of Cherry Hinton was built as an asylum in the mid-19th century between the village and Fulbourn. Until recently the very large main Victorian building was used as a psychiatric hospital. It is this hospital which gave rise to the lines "Strong men have run for miles and miles, When one from Cherry Hinton smiles;" in the poem The Old Vicarage, Grantchester by Rupert Brooke.

The settlement of Cherry Hinton gave its name to the Cherry Hinton Stakes a horse race for two-year-old thoroughbred fillies. This Group Two event run over a distance of 6 furlongs (1,207 m) on the July Course at nearby Newmarket Racecourse in early July. It was renamed the Duchess of Cambridge Stakes in 2013.

== See also ==
- List of places in Cambridgeshire
