= Journal of the Welsh Bibliographical Society =

The Journal of the Welsh Bibliographical Society was published annually from 1910 to 1984. It contained scholarly articles on Welsh writers, bibliographic research, and society notes in English and Welsh. It was published by the Welsh Bibliographical Society (Welsh: Y Gymdeithas Lyfryddol Gymreig), which was founded in 1907 to promote the study of Welsh bibliography, publishing, printing and writing. Its principal activities included an annual meeting and lecture, and publication of monographs.

The journal has been digitized by the Welsh Journals Online project at the National Library of Wales.
