= Cherry Hinton Pit =

Protected area in Cambridgeshire, England

Coordinates: 52.179°N 0.168°E

- Site of Special Scientific Interest
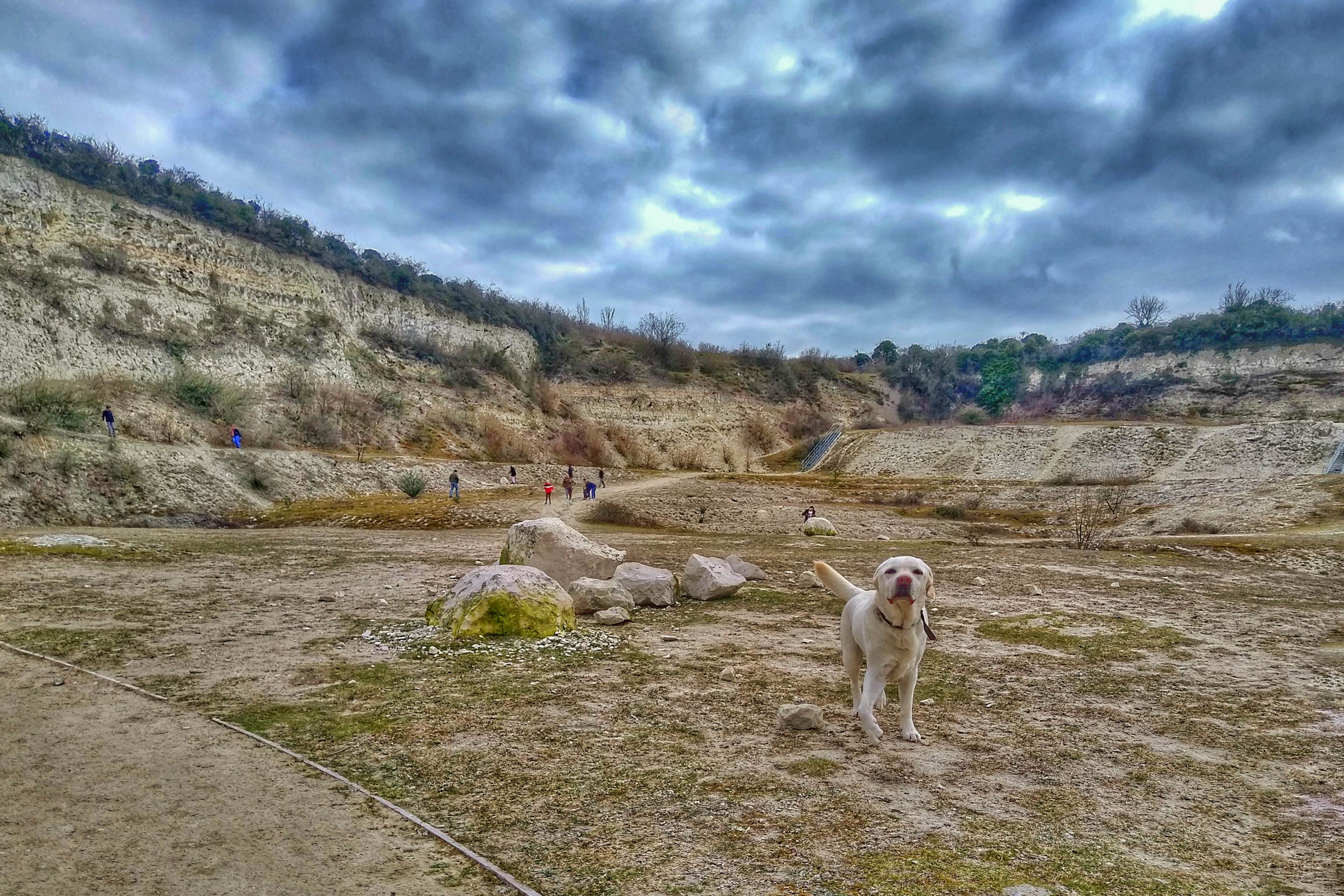
- Location of Cherry Hinton Pit.
- Area of search: Cambridgeshire
- Grid reference: TL 483 556
- Interest: Biological
- Area: 12.8 hectares
- Notification date: 1986
- Location map: Magic Map

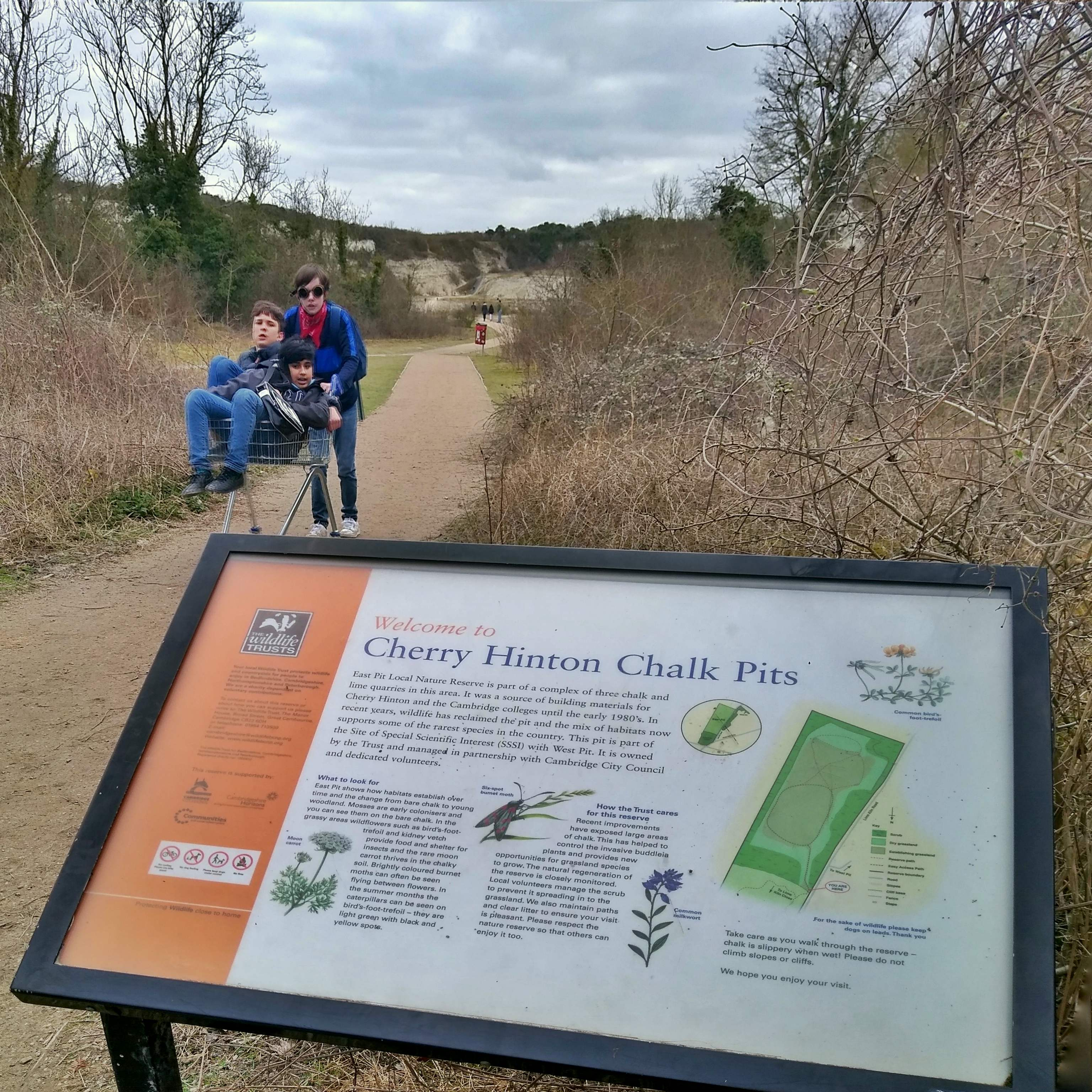
East Pit information signage

Cherry Hinton Pit is a 12.8-hectare (32-acre) biological Site of Special Scientific Interest (SSSI) on the south-eastern outskirts of Cambridge. The site consists of East Pit and most of the smaller West Pit (excluding a caravan park in the centre). East Pit is part of the Limekiln Close and East Pit Local Nature Reserve, which is managed by the Wildlife Trust for Bedfordshire, Cambridgeshire and Northamptonshire under the name Cherry Hinton Chalk Pits. West Pit is a separate Local Nature Reserve (LNR).

These former chalk quarries have a variety of habitats, including grassland and woodland with ash trees, field maple and cherries. The site was designated an SSSI because it has four rare plants, three of which are listed in the British Red List of Threatened Species. These are great pignut, moon carrot and grape hyacinth.

Archaeologists have discovered human bones, Roman and Iron Age pottery fragments, and the remains of an Iron Age ditch on the site. The ditch is often referred to as the 'War Ditches' and believed to be part of a hill fort.

There is access from Limekiln Road, which goes between the two pits.

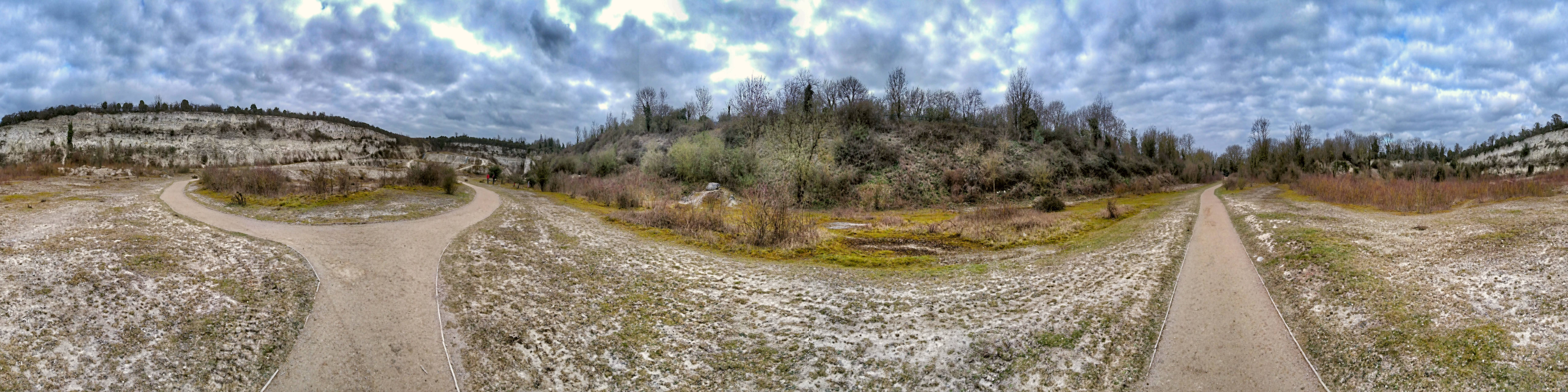
360° panorama from the middle of the East Pit
