= European intellectual property law =

European Intellectual Property Law
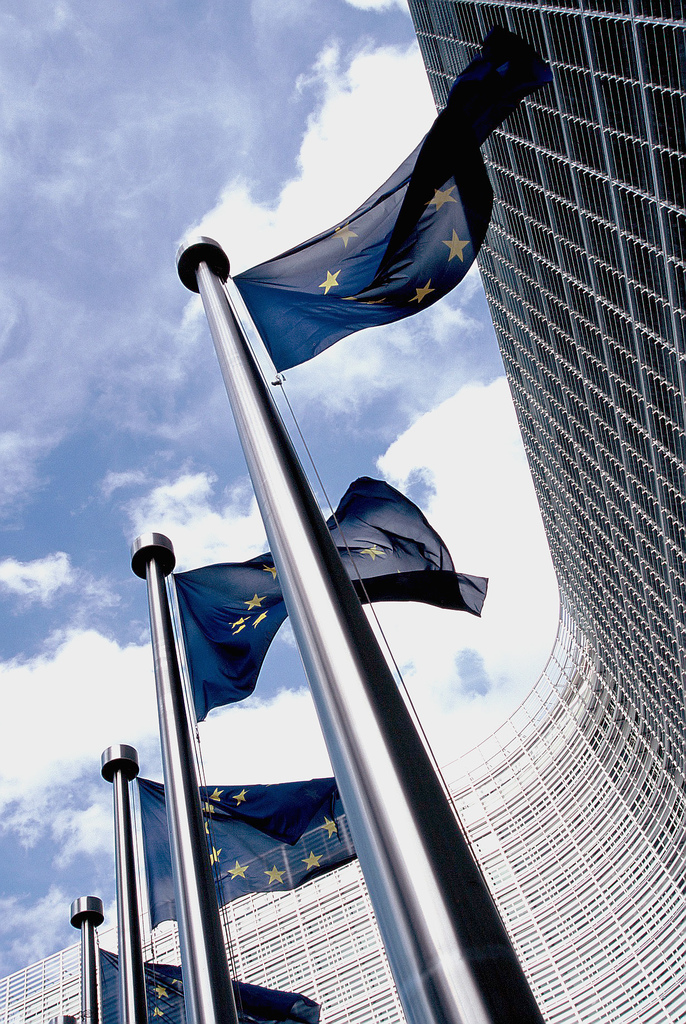
- Type: Intellectual Property
- Region served: Europe
- Members: Austria, Belgium, Bulgaria, British, Czech Republic, Denmark, Estonia, Finland, France, Germany, Greece
- Main organ: European Patent Office
- Website: www.epo.org

Intellectual property refers to an intangible property right which is enjoyed by law after the engagement in intellectual creative conducts, which cover a range of intangible property rights: patent, copyrights, trademark, design right and an indication of the original. Europe Union regulates the range of the law, including three different interdependent serious legislation, primary and secondary legislation, and law in cases. The empty area regulated by individual national members is not in the coverage of EU law. Based on the EU treaties, EU members each have the right to transfer and implement the discretion of EU law. Therefore, compared to conducting the application to the separate countries in EU it harbors more advantages to apply for the European patent office when seeking to obtain more extensive patent protection. That is to say, at each signatory of the Convention of European Patent, the holder who are granted the patent is given the equivalent right to the national patent of the countries.

== History of European intellectual property ==
The European patent system offers the home of the world patent system. Venice in 1474 and the British Monopoly Law in 1623, contributed to the earliest patent system. The development of the European patent system stands for the pioneer and epitome of the evolution of the international patent system; it is the ultimate goal to establish a globalized unified (single) patent system. Besides, EPC, which was signed on 2/10 1973 in Munich, Germany, and entered into force on October 7, 1977, accepted the first patent application on 1/6, 1978. Despite the fact it does not have the membership of the EPC, the EPC system has undergone a large-scale development from the first eight members states to the current 32 members states and five countries, they have recognized the patent rights granted by the EPC. The European Patent Organization established by EPC functions as the European Patent Office and the Administrative Commission. The European Patent Office takes up granting European patents. The Administrative Commission is to oversee the work of the European Patent Office. Headquartered in Munich, Germany, the European Patent Office is conducting the full responsibility for the search, examination and authorization of European patents. Also, with a brand in The Hague and the Netherlands coordinated responsibilities for search. Anyone of the languages, English, German and French, and European patent applications are utilized as the official working languages of the European Patent Office.

Member States of EPC (as of August 23, 2007): Austria, Belgium, Bulgaria, Cyprus, Czech Republic, Denmark, Estonia, Finland, France, Germany, Greece, Hungary, Iceland, Ireland, Italy, Latvia, Liechtenstein, Lithuania, Luxembourg, Monaco, Netherlands, Poland, Portugal, Romania, Slovak Republic, Slovenia, Spain, Sweden, Switzerland, Turkey, United Kingdom, Malta.

== Individual rights ==
=== Patent ===
In the United Kingdom, a patent which may be granted for an invention should satisfy several demands: being novel, involved with an inventive procedure, being capable of industrial application and not otherwise excluded from patentability. If the invention is regarded as a product, the patent owner can have the right to prevent third parties from making, disposing of, offering, utilizing importing or remaining that product. If it is deemed as a process, the patent owner can prevent third parties from making use of it or disposing of, offering, using importing or keeping any product made by means of that process.

Although the patent law was not formally incorporated into the entire community, similar practices were still adopted by other member states and the European Patent Office. According to the European Court of Justice in the Centrafarm v Sterling Drug case, a patent contains :

The guarantee that the patentee, to reward the creative effort of the inventor, possesses the exclusive right to apply an invention with a view to manufacture and produce industrial products and putting them into circulation for the first time, either directly or by the grant of licenses to third parties, as well as the right to oppose infringements.

=== Copyrights ===
In the United Kingdom, copyright, as a property includes serious descriptions of work: original literary, dramatic, musical or artistic works, sound recordings, films, and the typographical arrangement of published editions. The owner of copyright possesses the following exclusive rights: to copy the work; to release copies of the work to the public; to rent or lend the work to the public; to perform, present or play the work in public; to perform communication of the work to the public; to make an adaptation of the work or conduct any of the above mentioned in relation to an adaptation.

Similarly, although the patent law was not formally incorporated into the entire community, similar rules were employed by other member states.

Based on the thought of commercial usage in Europe, Musik Vertrieb Membran v GEMA case demonstrated that the commercial property was recognized and acknowledged to be provided the protection afforded by copyright, especially when commercial use is carried out in a manner that allows for the sale of goods containing literary or artistic works in different countries. Besides, in terms of protection, the European Court of Justice rules in Phil Collins v Imtrat states that:

To guarantee the protection of the rights and economic rights of right holders can be achieved. The protection of moral rights provides an opportunity for both the author and performers particularly to restrain the work from distortions, damage or other modifications, which are detrimental to their honor or reputation. Copyright and proximity are also economically inherent, as they are authorized to commercialize the sale of protected works, especially in the form of licenses for payment of royalties.

=== Trademark ===
The trademark as a registered right may be authorized by a single member state or a community to achieve the adoption of the 'Domestic Market Integration Office' in Alicante（a city in Spain）. No matter which case, A trademark includes any symbol that can be represented graphically, especially words, including a person's name, design, letters, numbers, the shape or packaging of a commodity, as long as these symbols meet the requirement of distinguishing the commodity or service, and undertaking commitments of other enterprises

The trademark owner possesses the right to prohibit third parties from utilizing the same or confusing similar identifiers during the process of their trade without any permission, such as attaching the identification to the goods or their packaging, and importing or exporting the goods bearing the identification or will be put on the market. Everyone can forbid the application of the same logo associated with a registered trade in goods or services, and can also prohibit the utilization of the same or similar logo on the same or similar goods, which unavoidably leads similar confusion to the public. A well-known trademark owner also possesses the right to prohibit any implementation of the logo under these conditions of the absence of proper cause, improper use or damage to distinctive features or visibility of the trademark.

Furthermore, it contains the right of the owner to forbid any application of the mark that may impose an influence on the guarantee of origin. The origin guarantee deemed to be a significant function of the mark aims at ensuring that the origin of the trademarked goods can be clearly known to the consumer or end user, freeing them from any possibility of distinguishing the goods from the products of another place of origin. In addition, it can determine that a trademarked product sold to it has not been subjected to third-party intervention without performing authorization from the trademark owner in the early stages of sale, for example, the effect of the original state of the goods.

As with the Right to design, the specific subject matter of trademark rights does not include the right to forbid the transport of goods. The European Court of Justice in the Rioglass case is legally employed in the production of cars in Spain and transported to Poland and then equipped with a non-member car window and windshield trademark. The court declared that the transport of products would be legally produced in a Member State and then transported to a non-member State, and if one or more Member States did not involve any sale of the products related, therefore it is not necessary for them to bear the responsibility of infringing the specific subject matter of the trademark.

=== Appellations of origin and Geographical Indications ===
Distinguished from trademark rights, specific names can also be protected as intellectual property, such as geographical (e.g. Champagne, Port or Bordeaux) or non-geographical names (e.g. Feta or Basmati) associated with certain products. Products originating from that region may present specific qualities or characteristics and the association that arises therefrom is protected by giving local producers an exclusive on the name.

In the community, agricultural by-products or food names may be protected by the Protected Designation of Origin (PDO) and Geographical Indications (PGI) in accordance with Regulation 1151/2012.

=== Design rights ===
In the community, registered and unregistered designs protect the product in whole or in part from several aspects of the particular contour, color, shape, structure and/or product characteristics of the product itself or its decoration. If the design is novel and can create an overall unique impression that is different from any previous design to the user, the design right can be obtained easily and quickly. The holder has the right to prohibit third parties from making, providing, placing, importing, exporting, using or storing any product which contains or applies the design.

Besides, Transport within the Community in the case of the commission v France related to Article 30 of the EC Treaty, includes the transport of goods from one Member State to another across the border where one or more Member States are not involved with protected designs. The implementation of the appearance does not constitute the part of the specific theme of both the industrial and commercial property rights in terms of the design.

== European patent Office ==
The institutional setting of the European Patent Office (EPO) is made up of the following five division bureaus, headquarters, department, department, and section. The bureau sets the position of one director and five deputy directors. A total of five headquarters-level institutions are set up throughout the overall situation. Besides, each deputy director also undertakes the first-in-command of a headquarters. Among them, the first headquarters, which is located in The Hague, perform the duty of searching and documentation. The remaining four headquarters are located in Munich and the second headquarters shoulder the responsibility for the integrated administrative management; and the fifth headquarters are in charge of legal and international affairs. In addition, the European Patent Office is equipped with a patent information center in Vienna, Austria. With branches in Berlin, it undertakes part of management, search, and documentation.

The patent protection of European countries through the EPO embraces the following characteristics:

- In accordance with the provisions of the European Patent Convention, the patent application can be designated for protection in multiple countries. That means that the European patent may commit the equal effect to a national patent in any or all of the member states. In this case, it is likely that the procedure will be simplified to submit patent applications separately in multiple countries, with the advantage of saving expenses and facilitating applicants;
- European patents are approved in accordance with a uniform legal review. They will not render different consequences to the patent law of each country in the aspects of procedures and review requirements. These features guarantee the security of the applicant. The guaranteed efficiency and quality of European patent examinations are made to be faster and more cost-effective compared to the application for a country-by-country application, especially, a business-based increase in the value of inventions;
- The European Patent Office utilizes the three languages of English, French and German, which extends a larger applicant options to employ the language, aiming to reduce the expense on applying for each language in different languages.
- The European Patent Office adopts a separate procedure for search and examination, thus facilitating the timely processing of patent applications by applicants and forging coordinated international patent cooperation treaties on the basis of promoting the submission of applicants for international patent applications.
- While building up strengthened management, review and retrieval of the bureau, the EPO also embraces a good and extensive cooperative relationship with the government and non-governmental patent agencies. Additionally, a constantly developing and strengthening cooperation is committed to the State Intellectual Property Office in the field of patents.
- Billed as the most powerful and modern patent offices in the world, the EPO is endowed with the world's most complete patent documentation resources as it is providing advanced patent information retrieval systems and extensive experience in patent examination, grievance and legal research. Moreover, the collection, retrieval and training of examiners have ensured a lot of assistance to the Chinese Intellectual Property Office. In addition, on a regular basis, the two offices conduct some extensive exchanges in the literature and information products.

== See also ==
- European Union law
