= St Andrew's Church, Cherry Hinton =

St Andrew’s Church, Cherry Hinton
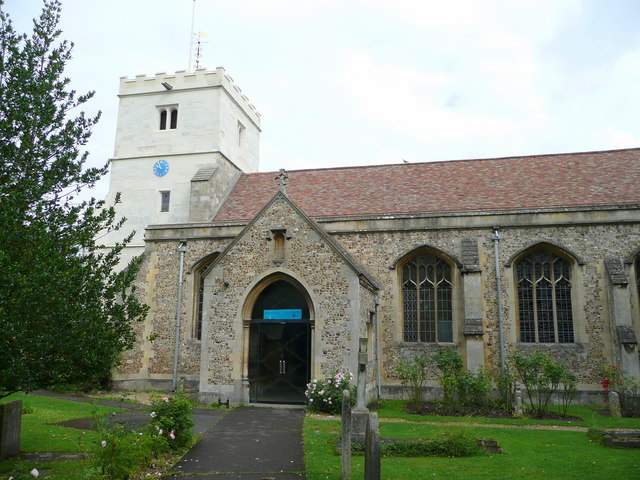
- St Andrew’s Church, Cherry Hinton
- St Andrew’s Church, Cherry Hinton
- 52°11′31″N 0°10′41″E
- OS grid reference: TL 48971 57096
- Location: St Andrew’s Church High Street, Cherry Hinton, Cambridge
- Country: England
- Denomination: Church of England
- Website: standrews-cherryhinton.org.uk

History
- Status: Active

Architecture
- Functional status: Parish church
- Heritage designation: Grade I listed
- Style: Gothic

Administration
- Diocese: Diocese of Ely
- Archdeaconry: Archdeaconry of Cambridge

Clergy
- Bishop: The Rt Revd Stephen Conway (Bishop of Ely)

St Andrew's Church, Cherry Hinton is a Church of England parish church in Cherry Hinton, Cambridge. It is Grade I listed. The building dates from the late 12th century with a 13th-century chancel. It was constructed using locally available flint, clunch and Barnack stone (oolitic Lincolnshire limestone).

== History ==
The oldest parts of the present church date to the Norman period, though the building is largely 13th century. Simon Langham, Bishop of Ely (1362–1366) gave the rectory of Cherry Hinton to Peterhouse, Cambridge.

The church was neglected after the Reformation, with the nave clerestory collapsing in 1792.

The church was restored and rebuilt by George Gilbert Scott Jr. in 1877-80. Charles Lingard Bell, however, gives the architect as John Oldrid Scott. In this restoration, the nave was rebuilt in Ketton stone, replacing the original clunch, and the arcades were dismantled, recut and re-erected. The 18th century roof was replaced with a new 'pseudo-hammerbeam' structure. A memorial tablet to Ann Cromwell (d.1556) was destroyed. The chancel was more sensitively restored in 1886 by John Thomas Micklethwaite.

A daughter church, St John the Evangelist's, was founded in 1891 to serve the developing residential area between Hills Road and Cherry Hinton Road.

A pyramid-roofed church hall was added in 1982, and the external tower stonework was renewed in 2007-08.

== Architecture ==
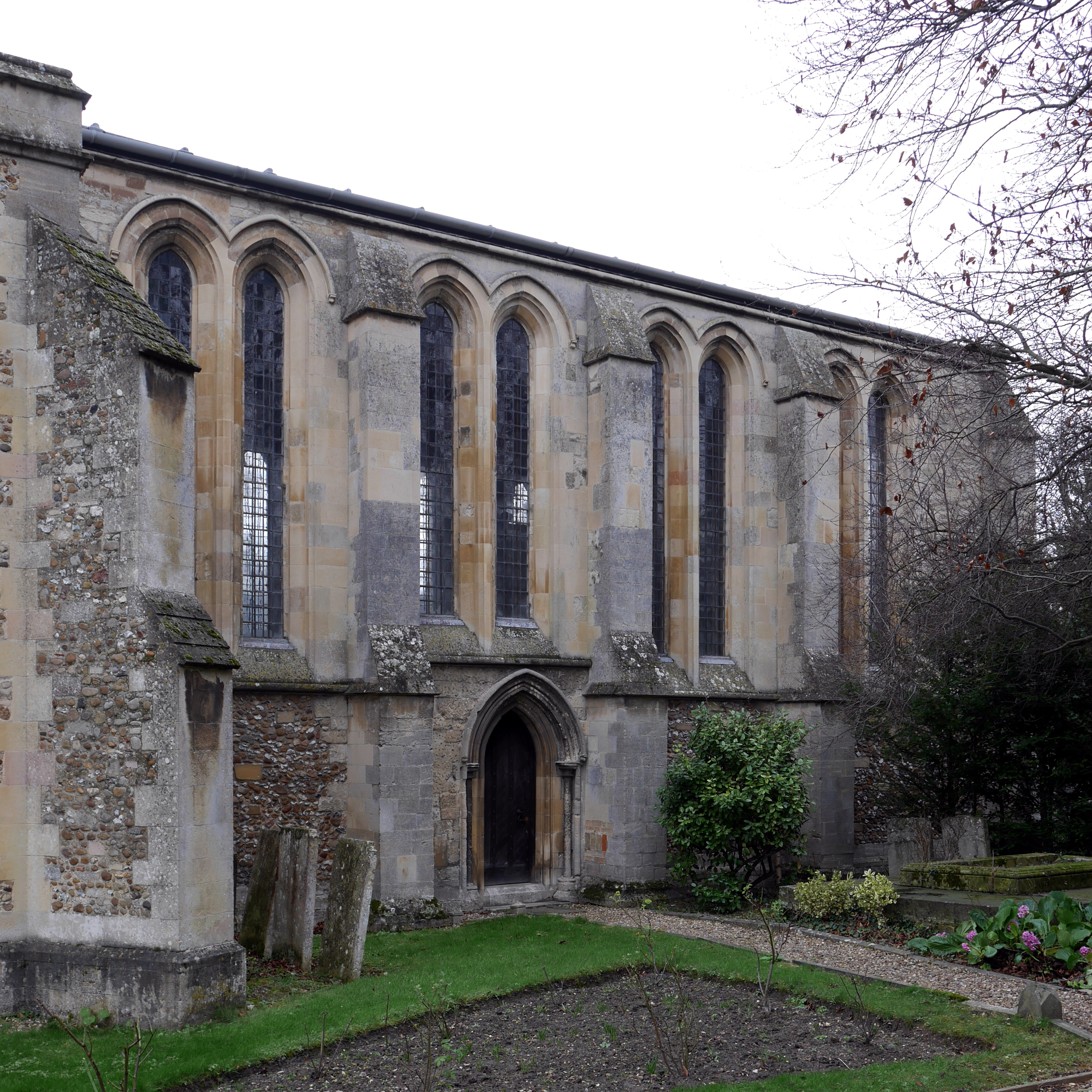
Chancel with its Early English lancet windows

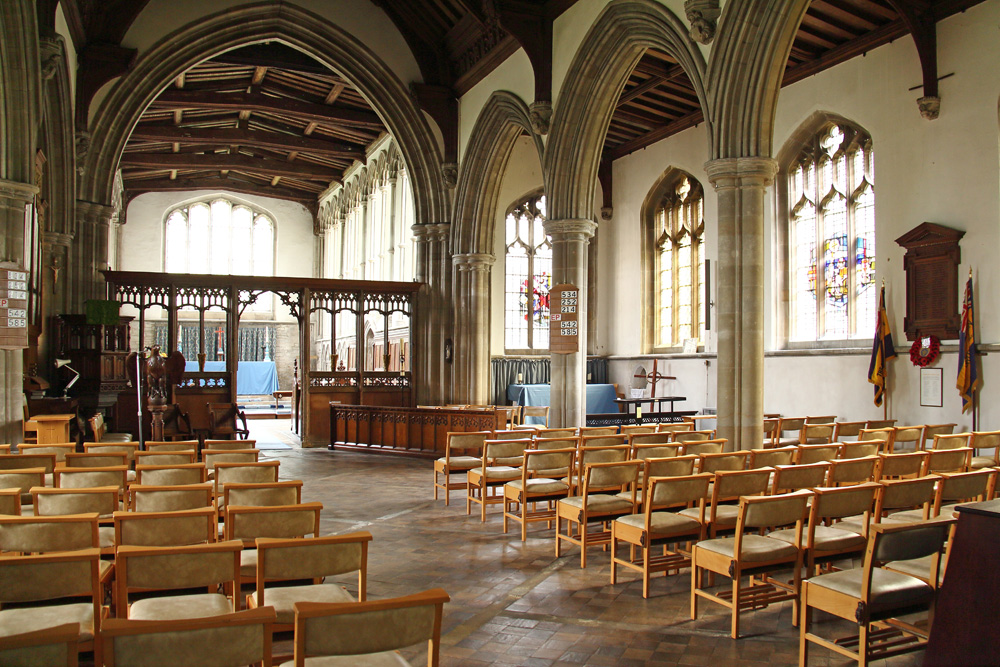
Interior of the nave, looking towards the screen and chancel.

The ashlar-faced chancel with its pairs of lancet windows (c.1230-50.) is a fine example of Early English Gothic architecture. The nave was constructed shortly afterwards, with shafted piers and richly moulded arcade arches. The east window was replaced in the early Tudor period by a five-light version in the Perpendicular style, at which time a vestry was added. It has a rood screen of similar date, though altered by the Victorians. The aisles and ashlar-faced tower are also in the Perpendicular style though there are remnants of Norman origin in the tower arch jambs. Within the tower the second bell dates from the 14th century and is the oldest in the city.

In the tower is the coffin-shaped tablet of Captain Serocold (d.1794) by John Flaxman.
