= Cherry Hinton Hall =

House and park in Cambridgeshire, England

Coordinates: 52.18597°N 0.16494°E

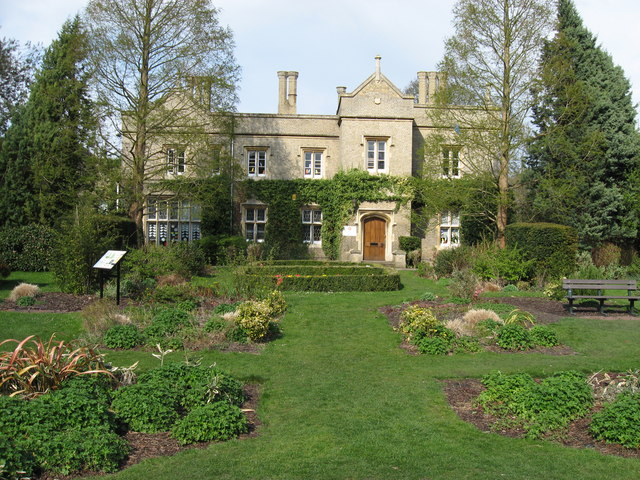
The front of Cherry Hinton Hall

Cherry Hinton Hall is a house and park in Cherry Hinton, to the south of Cambridge, England. The house and grounds are owned and managed by Cambridge City Council.

The Hall hosts the annual Cambridge Folk Festival that draws thousands to the park. During the summer Cherry Hinton Hall is popular including with young families. Community activities also take place in the park, such as an archaeological and buildings survey carried out by local schoolchildren in 2007.

In 2007, Cherry Hinton Hall became home to Cambridge International School.

The Friends of Cherry Hinton Hall was formed in 2009 as a group concerned about the usage, environment, welfare and future of the park for the benefit of those who use it most.

== Owners and residents ==
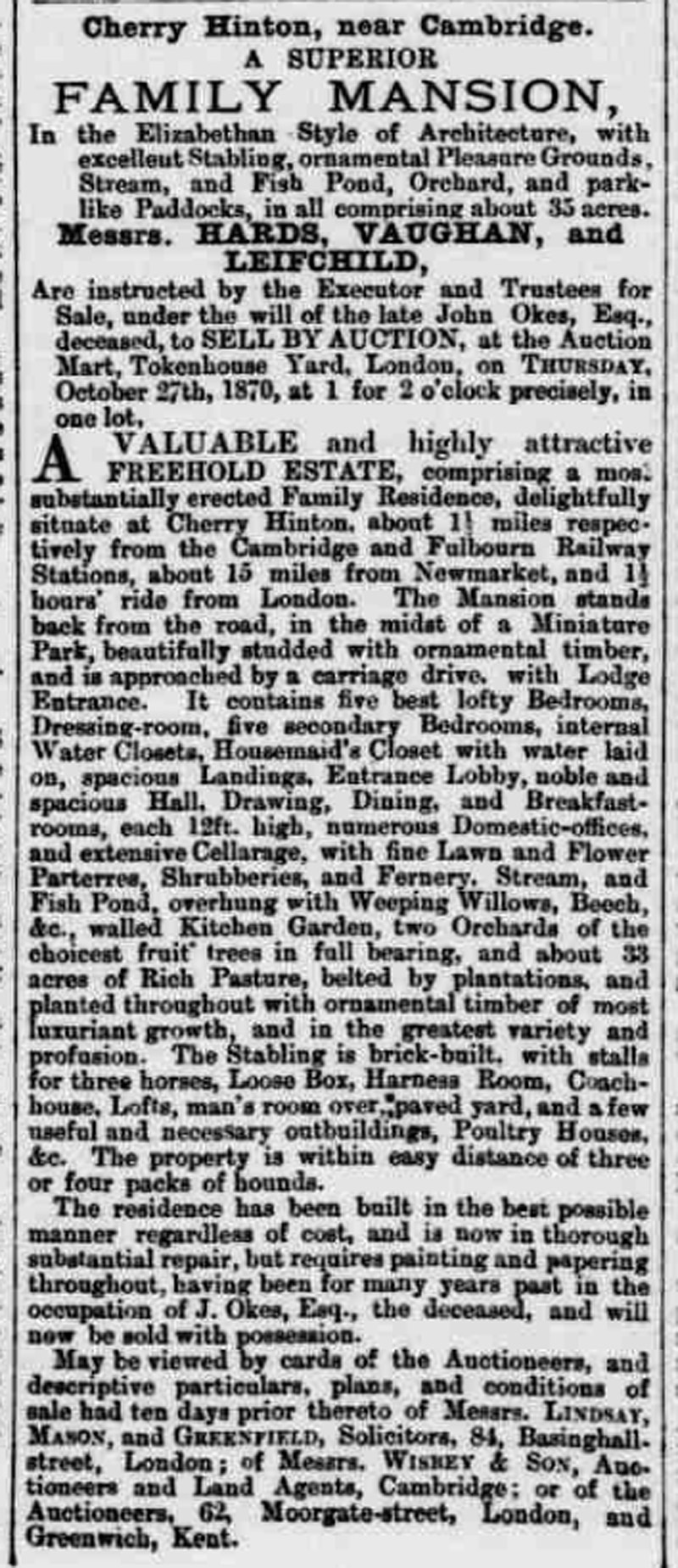
Advertisement for Cherry Hinton Hall in 1870.

Cherry Hinton Hall was built in 1839 by John Okes (1793-1870), a surgeon at Addenbrookes Hospital in Cambridge. He had been apprenticed to his father, Thomas Verney Okes, a doctor at Addenbrookes Hospital, before qualifying at the University of Cambridge as a surgeon. In 1824 Okes married Mary Elizabeth Collin, only daughter of Joseph Martin, of Epping. They lived in Cambridge for some time; from 1831 Okes purchased the old enclosures at Mill End Close, and the land at Mill End common, and in 1839 built Cherry Hinton Hall on this land. John Okes outlined in a court case the improvements he made to the land. He said when he bought it there was only an old farm house on it. He built the Hall and then laid out the gardens. He made the following statement in 1854: “I have laid out a considerable sum of money in planting. When I purchased the estate the Cherry Hinton Brook ran through it. The whole stream came from two springs skirting my property. In building the house I selected the spot with a view of making ornamental water. I cut a channel and made the lake in a great measure and have been every year enlarging it. I have stocked the stream for trout and dug a pond for pike". On Okes's death in 1870 the Cherry Hinton estate was sold to the Cambridge University and Town Waterworks Company. One of the Directors of the Waterworks Company was the next resident.

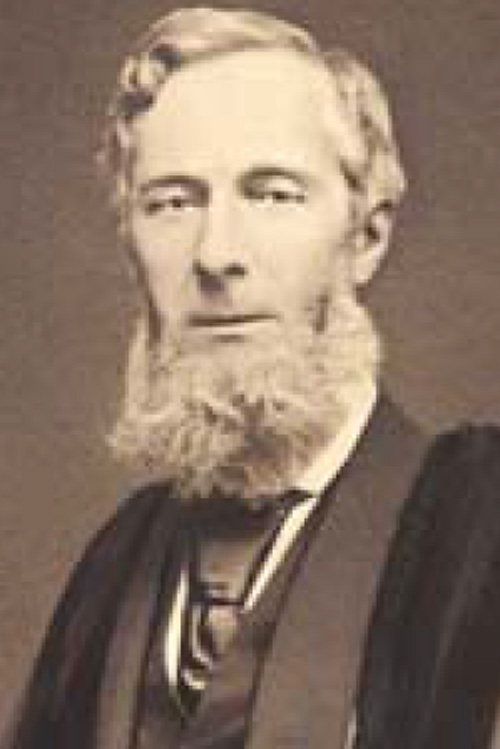
Charles Balls.

Charles Balls was born in 1810 in Cambridge, son of farm labourer Henry Balls. He became a shoe-maker, subsequently making his fortune as a leather merchant. In 1858 and 1859 he was appointed Mayor of Cambridge, and was later one of the Directors of the Cambridge University and Town Waterworks Company and, at one time, was Chairman of the Cambridge University and Town Gas Light Company. His wife Eliza died in 1876 at Cherry Hinton Hall and Charles and his daughters lived at the Hall until 1888 when they moved back to Cambridge. Charles died in 1892 in his Cambridge home at the age of 82.

By 1902, Richard Thomas Lyons MD lived at the Hall. In 1902 solicitor Sir William Phene Neal, 1st Baronet (Lord Mayor of London in 1930) and his wife came to live at the Hall, and remained there for many years.

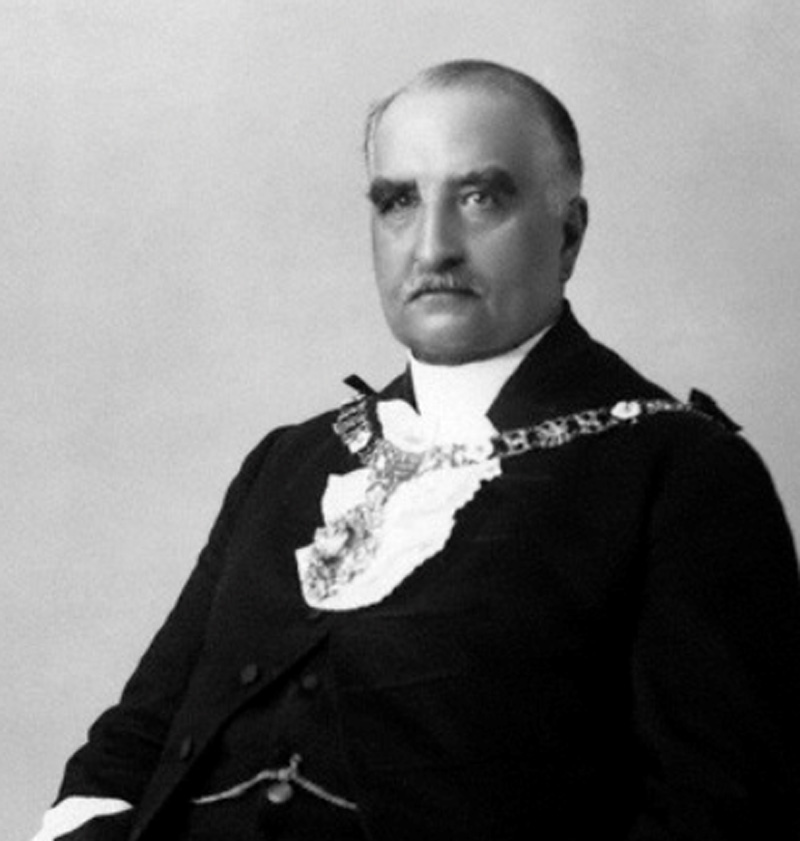
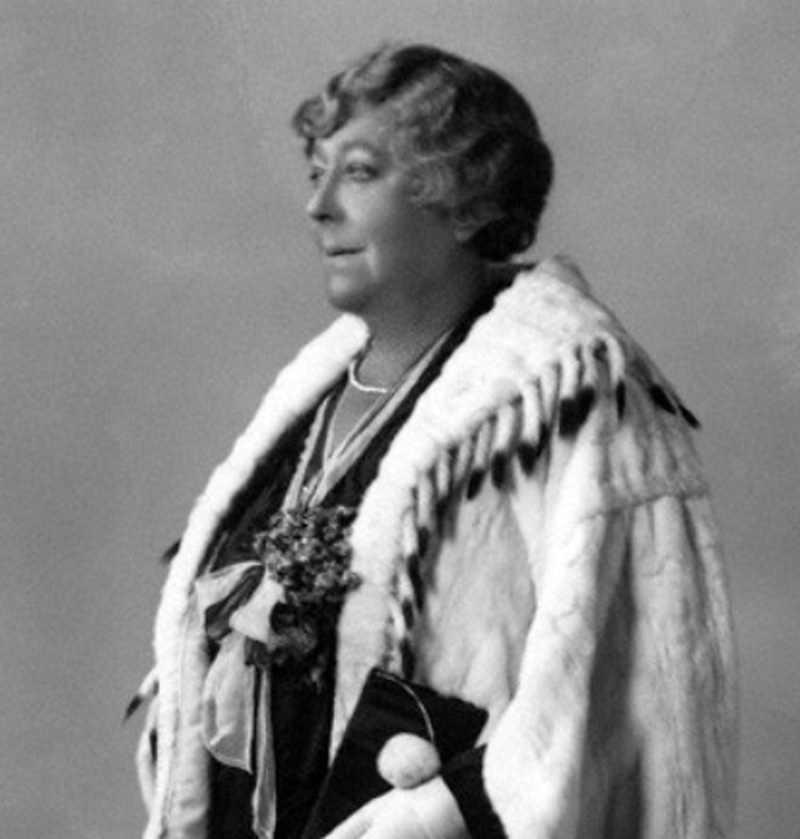
Sir William Phene Neal and his wife Eleanor Vise Neal, Lady Neal

It appears that Neal operated a dairy farm on the estate, as reference is made in a trade magazine to the “Cherryhinton Hall Farm Dairy". In the 1930s the Hall and surrounding land was purchased by the Cambridge City Council and they still own it today.
