= Cambridge International School, Cambridge =

Cambridge International School

Location
- Cherry Hinton Road; Cambridge, Cambridgeshire, CB1 8DW; England; 52.186298°N 0.164112°E

Information
- Type: International school
- Established: 2006; 20 years ago February 27, 2025; 20 months ago (Relaunch)
- Founders: Dr. Daniel Sturdy; Dr. Harriet Sturdy
- Closed: November 26, 2021; 4 years ago
- Sister school: Holme Court School
- Department for Education URN: 146301 Tables
- Head teacher: Daniel Orwin
- Gender: Mixed
- Age: 2 to 11
- Website: https://cischool.co.uk/

Cambridge International School is a private mixed non-selective international school for children aged 2 to 11 located in Cambridge, England. It was founded by Dr Harriet Sturdy and Dr Daniel Sturdy. The school was founded in 2006 and located to Cherry Hinton Hall in 2007. From 2010 to 2020 they had a Senior School in Little Abington called The Temple and a Sixth Form on Bateman Street in Cambridge called Ci6 from 2016 to 2019.

As an international school, it uses English as the primary medium of instruction for students, but also operates a mother-tongue programme of first language study.
