= Grantchester (disambiguation) =

Grantchester is an English village and civil parish. Other uses include:

== Media ==
- "The Old Vicarage, Grantchester", poem by Rupert Brooke
- The Grantchester Mysteries, mystery crime fiction book series

- The Road to Grantchester, the seventh book in the series

- Grantchester Grind, novel by Tom Sharpe
- Grantchester (TV series), British detective drama
- "Grantchester Meadows" (song), Pink Floyd song, 1969

== Other ==
- Grantchester knot, method for tying a necktie
- Grantchester Road, rugby stadium in Cambridge, England
- Grantchester Meadows, open space in Grantchester, England
- Baron Grantchester, title in the peerage of the United Kingdom

- Alfred Suenson-Taylor, 1st Baron Grantchester
- John Suenson-Taylor, 3rd Baron Grantchester
