= The Great Lover =

The Great Lover may refer to:

- nickname of actor Rudolph Valentino
- nickname of John Gilbert
- The Great Lover (play), a 1915 Broadway play
- The Great Lover (1920 film), an American film directed by Frank Lloyd
- The Great Lover (1931 film), an American film featuring Adolphe Menjou and Irene Dunne
- The Great Lover (1949 film), an American comedy film starring Bob Hope and Rhonda Fleming
- "The Great Lover", a poem by Rupert Brooke
- The Great Lover (novel), a novel by Jill Dawson inspired by the Brooke poem
