= The Orchard (tea room) =

Tea room and tea garden in Grantchester, near Cambridge

Coordinates: 52.1774°N 0.0965°E

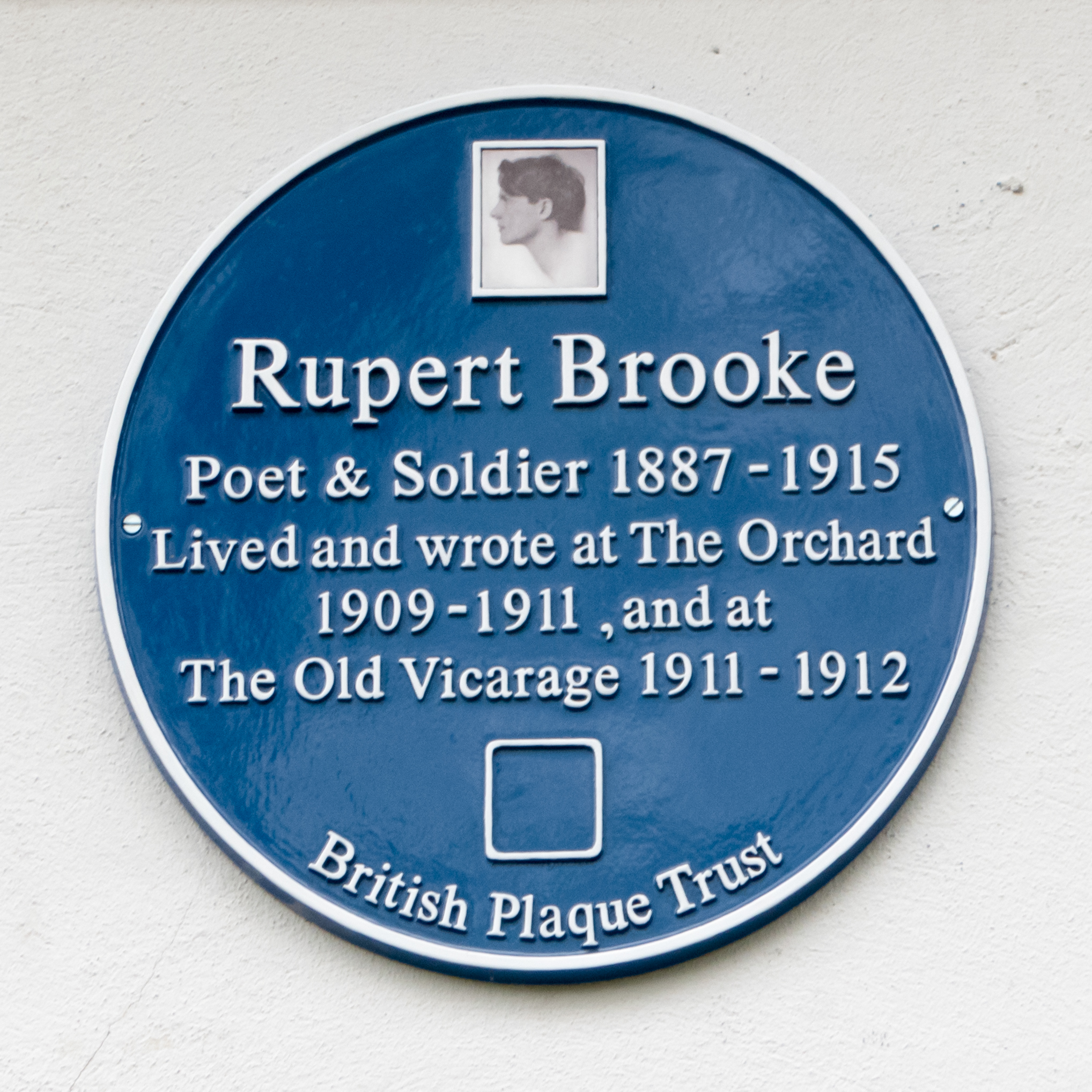
Blue plaque commemorating poet Rupert Brooke at Orchard House and the Old Vicarage. Unveiled 25 April 2015.

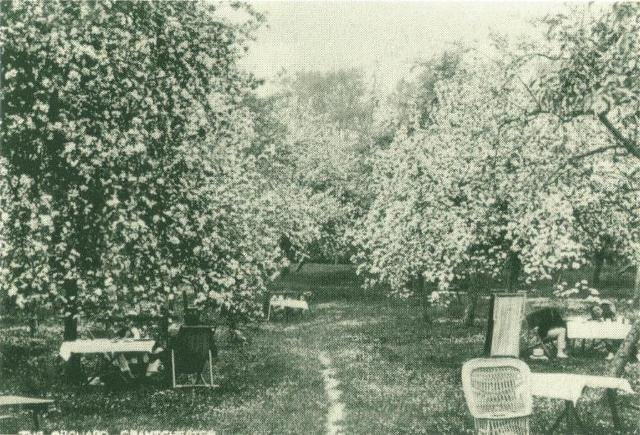
The Orchard in blossom, c. 1910.

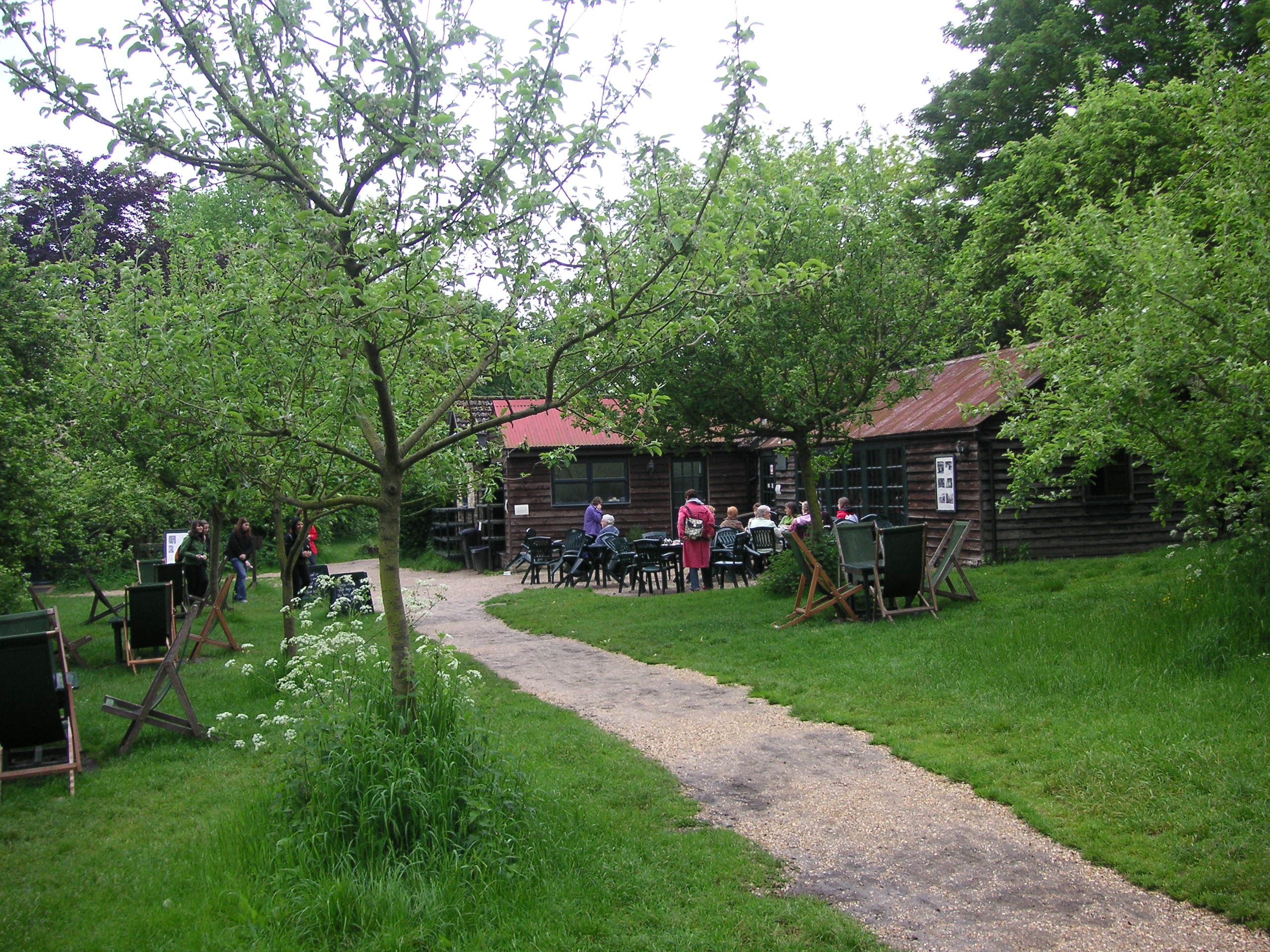
The Orchard, May 2007

The Orchard is a tea room and garden in the English village of Grantchester, near Cambridge, serving morning coffee, lunches and afternoon teas. Since opening in 1897, it has been a popular retreat for Cambridge students, teachers and tourists, as well as locals, with many famous names among its patrons. The Orchard is open year-round, and is most pleasantly approached by punt along the River Cam, or along the footpath and cycleway through the Grantchester Meadows.

== History ==
The orchard was planted in 1868, opposite the ancient Church of St Andrew and St Mary. By the 1890s the adjoining house and its grounds were in the hands of a Mrs Stevenson, who served tea to lodgers and visitors on the front garden. A group of Cambridge students asked the landlady if she could serve their refreshments in the orchard instead. This practice soon became the norm, and the place grew in popularity.

The poet Rupert Brooke took up lodging in Orchard House in 1909. A handsome young man of great charisma and talent, Brooke soon attracted a great following at the place, among them Virginia Woolf, John Maynard Keynes, E.M. Forster, Bertrand Russell, Augustus John, and Ludwig Wittgenstein – the so-called Grantchester Group, or the neo-pagans as Woolf called them. Brooke later lodged in a neighbouring house, the Old Vicarage, and immortalised both houses in his poem The Old Vicarage, Grantchester. Written while Brooke was in Berlin in 1912, the poem ends with the lines:

Stands the church clock at ten-to-three?
And is there honey still for tea?

Subsequently, the ownership of Orchard House and the tea room passed to Robin Callan, originator of the Callan Method for the study of English by non-native speakers.
