= Grantchester Meadows =

Meadow in Cambridgeshire, England

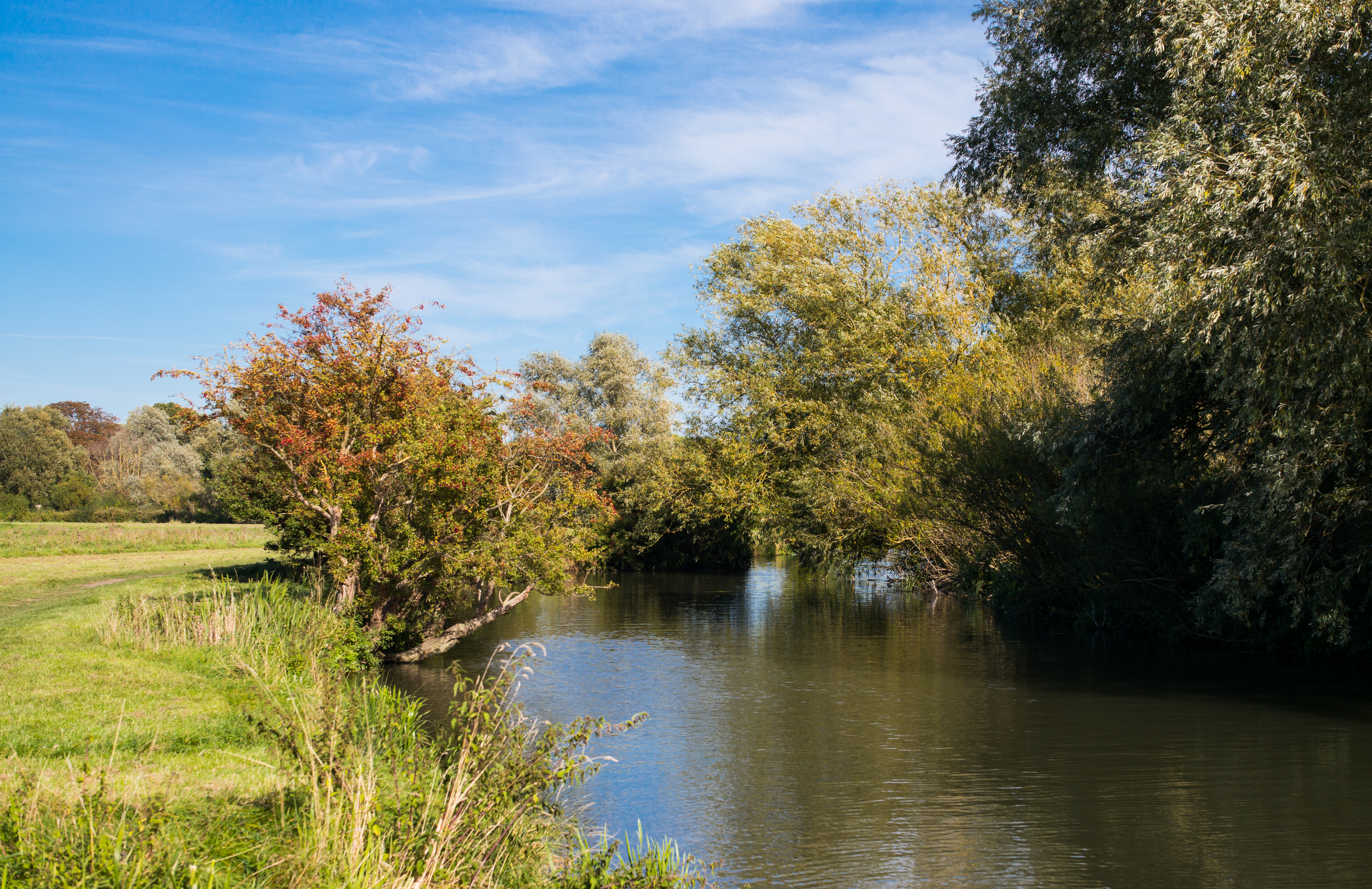
- The River Cam at Grantchester Meadows
- Interactive map of Grantchester Meadows
- Nearest city: Cambridge, UK
- OS grid: TL 438 565
- Area: 50 acres (20 ha)
- Owner: King's College, Cambridge
- Manager: Cambridge Past, Present & Future

Grantchester Meadows are an open space to the south of the city of Cambridge, England. They occupy the west bank of the River Cam as it flows from the village of Grantchester to the edge of Cambridge at Newnham Croft. The flood plain of the river continues into the city centre via Skaters' Meadow (managed by the local Wildlife Trust), the Paradise Local Nature Reserve, the Sheep's Green and Coe Fen Local Nature Reserve and on to the Backs.

The Meadows are owned by King's College and have been managed by Cambridge Past, Present & Future (CPPF) since February 2025. Red Poll cattle graze from April to October. In its previous guise as the Cambridge Preservation Society, CPPF raised funds to pay King's College to take out legal covenants on the Meadows to protect them from possible development, and in the 1930s successfully opposed a proposal to construct a ring road through them.

The Meadows are "one of the most fully enjoyed stretches of rural country in the vicinity of Cambridge", used for dogwalking and picnics. A popular summer excursion is to walk, punt or paddle from the centre of Cambridge through the Meadows to the pubs in Grantchester.

The area has been known for swimming in the Cam for over 500 years, including notables such as Virginia Woolf and Rupert Brooke; Byron's Pool lies just upstream at Trumpington. In June 2021, King's College installed signs prohibiting swimming in the River Cam from Grantchester Meadows. This change was met with controversy. A King's spokesman said: "Sadly it has become increasingly apparent that this not only causes significant problems for the emergency services, but also brings with it a serious risk to life. As such it would be irresponsible for the College to continue to encourage swimming in an area where it is unsafe to do so". Camila Ilsley launched a petition against the closure, criticizing it as a "drastic action" that would "shut down traditions dear to the people of Cambridge, and choke our connection with its beautiful natural surroundings".

== In popular culture ==
The Meadows feature in the poem "Watercolor of Grantchester Meadows" by Sylvia Plath, and a 1969 song by the British rock band Pink Floyd. There is also a British TV show called Grantchester (TV series) that takes place in Grantchester Meadows and also had small parts filmed there.
