= Old Vicarage, Grantchester =

Historic house in Cambridgeshire, England

Coordinates: 52.17661°N 0.09715°E

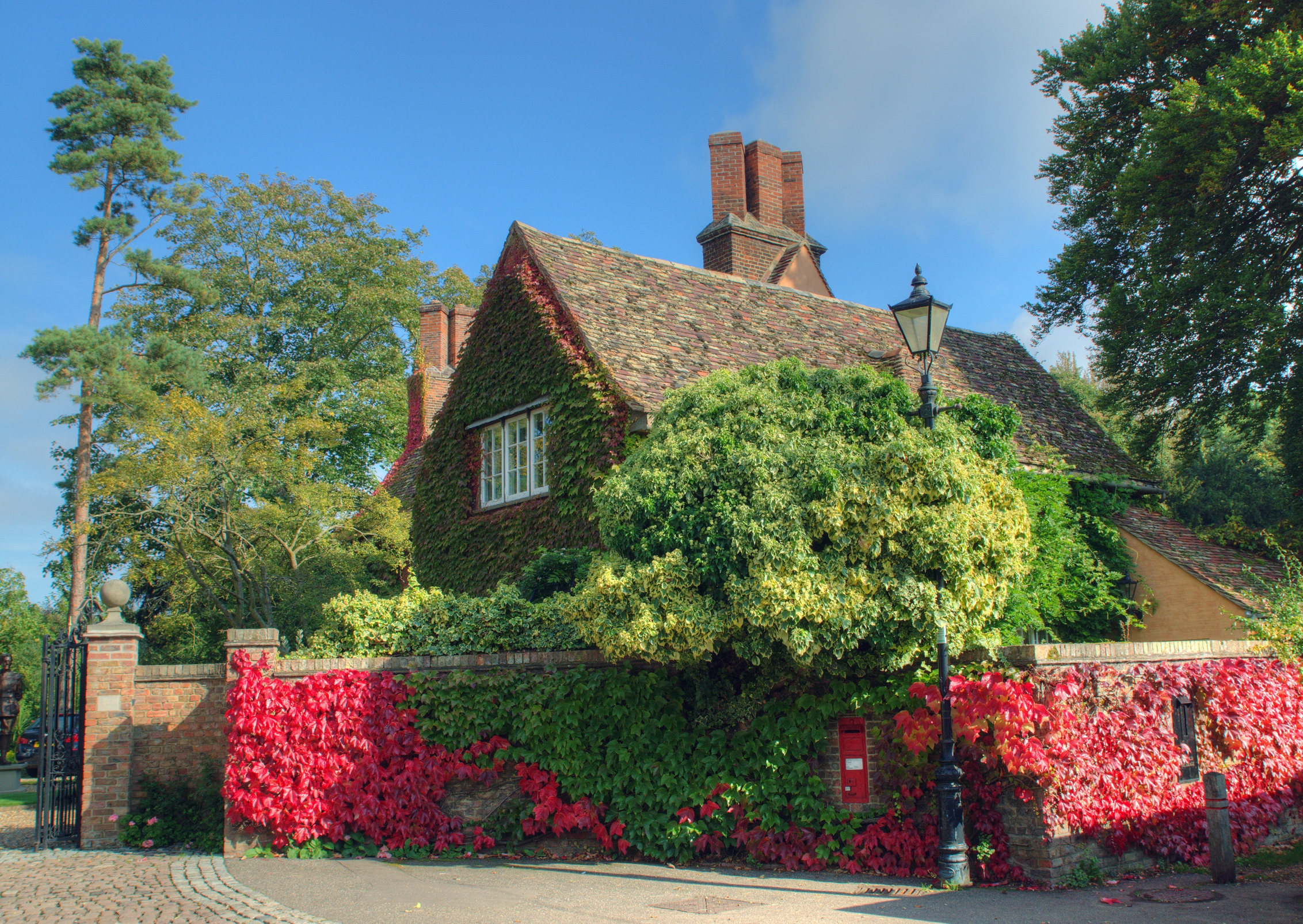
Old Vicarage, Grantchester

The Old Vicarage in the Cambridgeshire village of Grantchester is a house associated with the poet Rupert Brooke, who lived nearby, and in 1912 referenced it in an eponymous poem – "The Old Vicarage, Grantchester". The house is next door to The Orchard tea garden, also part of the poem. A portrait statue of Brooke by Paul Day stands in the front garden.

The Old Vicarage was built in around 1685 on the site of an earlier building, a minute's walk from the Church of St Andrew and St Mary. It passed from church ownership into private hands in 1820, and was bought in 1850 by Samuel Page Widnall (1825–1894), who extended it and established a printing business, the Widnall Press.

In 1910, it was owned by Henry and Florence Neeve, from whom Rupert Brooke rented a room and, later, a large part of the house. Brooke's mother bought the house in 1916 and gave it to his friend, the economist Dudley Ward. In December 1979, it was bought by the scientist Mary Archer, who had recently been appointed to a position at Cambridge University, and her husband Jeffrey Archer, then a politician and subsequently a novelist. The house has been listed Grade II on the National Heritage List for England since August 1962.

The Guardian crossword setter John Galbraith Graham (Araucaria) set a clue often described as epitomising his clue-making: Poetical scene with surprisingly chaste Lord Archer vegetating (3, 3, 8, 12), the last four words forming the anagram THE OLD VICARAGE GRANTCHESTER.
