= George Shaw (academic dress scholar) =

British scholar of academic dress (1928–2006)

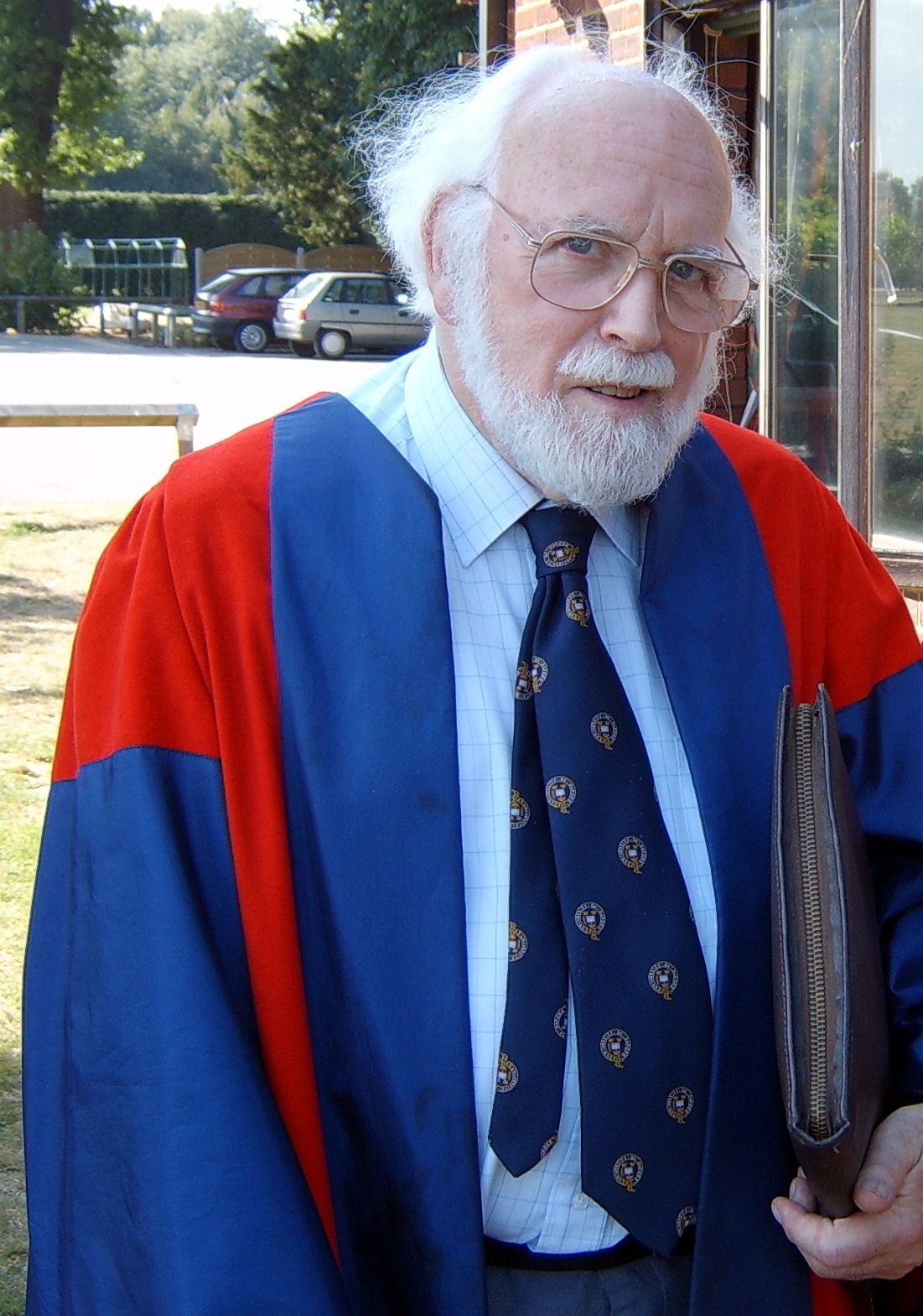
- Born: 28 April 1928; Stalybridge, United Kingdom
- Died: 27 November 2006 (aged 78); Grantchester, United Kingdom
- Occupations: biologist, scholar of academic dress
- Spouse: Mary Shaw
- Children: two sons, two daughters

George Wenham Shaw (usually published as "G.W. Shaw"; 28 April 1928 in Stalybridge, Cheshire – 27 November 2006 in Grantchester) was a biologist and leading British expert on academic dress. He designed the academic robes for the University of Bath UK, Trent University, Ontario and Universidad Simón Bolívar, Venezuela.

Shaw was also a patron of the Burgon Society, who are responsible for publishing a third, posthumous, edition of Shaw's Academical Dress.

== Biography ==
After studying at Altrincham Grammar School for Boys, George Shaw worked for a chemical company for two years, during which time he studied part-time at UMIST. In 1946, his interests having shifted from chemistry to biology, he began full-time undergraduate studies at the University of Wales, initially at Swansea before transferring to Bangor. Upon graduation, in 1950, he took up a teaching post at Deacon's School, Peterborough, and over the next three years he pursued research in cytogenetics in his spare time with assistance from colleagues at Cambridge. He submitted a dissertation based on this work to the University of Wales in 1953, and was awarded the degree of MSc by research.

In 1956 he entered Wadham College, Oxford as a postgraduate research student in the Department of Botany, obtaining the degree of DPhil in 1958. After leaving Oxford he took a teaching post at Lancing College, where he remained for the rest of his career. He and his wife Mary, who had been a fellow postgraduate researcher at Oxford, married in 1958 and subsequently had two sons and two daughters.

He had become interested in academic dress while at school, and began to study the subject during the course of his teaching career. He submitted an unsuccessful design for the academic dress of the newly founded University of Sussex in 1961, but was later commissioned to design gowns and hoods for several other institutions, including Trent University, the University of Bath (which in return conferred on him an honorary MA) and Simón Bolívar University (which also offered him an honorary degree, but he never travelled to Venezuela to collect it); also the University of Strathclyde adopted some of his suggested revisions to its scheme of academic dress in the early 1960s.

In 1966 the first edition of his authoritative work on British academic dress was published, and received a positive review in The Guardian from Peter Preston, as well as a four-page vitriolic diatribe in The Oxford Magazine from his colleague and occasional collaborator Charles Franklyn. A second, much-expanded edition was published in 1995, including details of all of the universities founded since the original publication, including those former polytechnics which had been accorded university status.

In 1969 he was appointed a Fellow of the Institute of Biology, which adopted his suggested fellowship hood in 1979. In 1970, the University of Hong Kong invited him to submit a portfolio of his published research for consideration, and awarded him the degree of DSc. Towards the end of his teaching career, in 1980, he was awarded a Schoolmaster's Fellowship to Girton College, Cambridge, which subsequently appointed him a Fellow Commoner. When the Burgon Society was founded in 2000, he became an active founding member and one of its first fellows honoris causa, and in 2005 became one of the Society's patrons. He died of heart failure in November 2006.

== Bibliography ==
- Shaw, G W (1 December 1957). "Adhension loci in the differentiated heterochromation of trillium species". Chromosoma. 9 (1): 292–304. doi:10.1007/BF02568082. S2CID 5717347.
- Shaw, G W (1966). Academical Dress of British Universities. Cambridge: Heffer.
- Contributor to: Franklyn, Charles A H, ed. (1972). The Degrees and Hoods of the World's Universities and Colleges (fifth ed.). Lewes: W E Baxter.
- Compiler of: Shaw, G W (1973). Cytology, Genetics and Evolution. London: J Murray. ISBN 0719527295.
- Shaw, George W (1982). Lancing: A Pictorial History. London: Phillimore. ISBN 0850334551.
- Shaw, G W (1992). Cambridge University Academical Dress (with notes on Oxford academical dress). Cambridge: Cambridge University Press.
- Shaw, George W (1995). Academical dress of British and Irish universities. Chichester, West Sussex: Phillimore. ISBN 085033974X.
