= Skaters' Meadow =

Nature reserve in Cambridge, England

Coordinates: 52.192°N 0.105°E

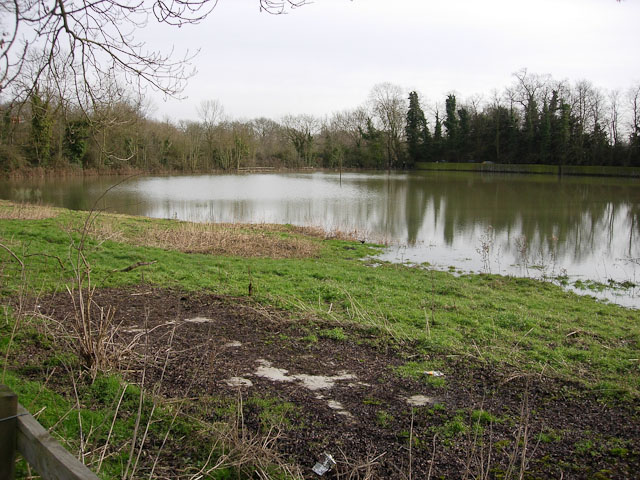
- Interactive map of Skaters' Meadow
- Type: Nature reserve
- Location: Cambridge, UK
- OS grid: TL440569
- Area: 2 hectares (4.9 acres)
- Owner: Cambridge Past, Present & Future
- Manager: Wildlife Trust for Bedfordshire, Cambridgeshire and Northamptonshire

Skaters' Meadow (or Skater's Meadow) is a 2-hectare (4.9-acre) nature reserve in Newnham Croft, Cambridge, UK. It is owned by Cambridge Past, Present & Future and leased for management by the Wildlife Trust for Bedfordshire, Cambridgeshire and Northamptonshire. It takes its name from times in the 19th century, when it would freeze and the public were charged to skate around the gas lamp that still stands in the middle.

The meadow is part of the floodplain of the river Cam, between the Paradise Local Nature Reserve owned by the city council, and Grantchester Meadows now managed by Cambridge Past, Present & Future. It is flower-rich wet grassland that includes common spotted orchids, cuckooflowers, meadowsweets, marsh-marigolds and ragged-robins. There are also grass snakes and birds such as blackcaps.

There is no access to the site, but it can be viewed from the road called Grantchester Meadows.
