= St. John Lucas =

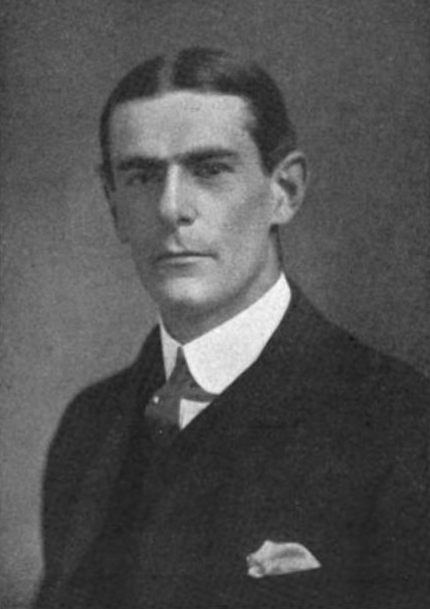
- In The Bookman, January 1908
- Born: St. John Welles Lucas-Lucas; 22 January 1879; Rugby, England
- Died: 23 October 1934 (aged 55); London, England
- Education: University College, Oxford
- Occupation: Poet

St. John Welles Lucas-Lucas (22 January 1879 – 23 October 1934), commonly known as St. John Lucas, was an English poet known for his anthologies of verse.

== Biography ==
St. John Lucas was born in Rugby, Warwickshire on 22 January 1879. He was educated at University College, Oxford. He was from 1905 a friend and mentor of Rupert Brooke.

Lucas wrote short stories and vignettes for Blackwood's Magazine and Open Window. His The Oxford Book of French Verse was published by the Clarendon Press in 1907. A selection of his stories was published in book form by William Blackwood and Sons in 1919 under the title Saints, Sinners, and the Usual People.

He is described in Mike Read's Forever England: The Life of Rupert Brooke as "a homosexual aesthete".

He died in London on 23 October 1934, and was cremated at Golders Green.
