= Charles Franklyn =

Charles Aubrey Hamilton Franklyn (25 August 1896 – 26 November 1982 (aged 86)) was a British medical doctor, and scholar of genealogy, heraldry, and academic dress. He was the son of Captain (later Major) Aubrey Hamilton Franklin and his wife Ethel Mary Franklin (née Gray), altering the spelling of his surname in 1932, as a result of his research into his own family history.

He traced his interest in academic dress to September 1910, when he became a pupil at Tonbridge School, and it retained considerable fascination for him for the rest of his life. Between 1949 and 1956 he designed complete systems of academic dress for the universities of Malaya (which bestowed upon him an honorary MA in 1951), Southampton, Hull, the Australian National University, and the Chichester Theological College. At various times he contributed to the academic dress schemes of several other universities (in particular, the universities of Cambridge and Nottingham, and the New University of Ulster). He also served as Bedell of Convocation at the University of London. In his works, he often boasts his own academical dress designs as the most 'beautiful and dignified in the world'.

His 1970 monograph on academic dress, the result of many years' research, is somewhat difficult to find (primarily due to its limited print run, and the author's insistence that any unwanted copies be returned to him rather than sold on) but contains a large amount of valuable information and remains a standard text on the subject.

He was married, in 1929, to Erica Milly Bolton; the marriage was annulled in 1933.

== Coat of arms ==
Franklyn's coat of arms was as follows:

Arms: Sable, on a bend invected between two martlets or, a dolphin hauriant proper, between a lion's head and a leopard's head both erased gules. Differenced with a crescent.

Mantling: Gules and or.
Crest: On a wreath of the colours, a demi-conger eel erect or, between two sprigs of hawthorn fructed proper.

Motto: Pro rege, patria et familia

== Bibliography ==
- The Bearing of Coat Armour by Ladies (John Murray, 1923)
- A Short genealogical & heraldic history of the families of Frankelyn of Kent and Franklyn of Antigua & Jamaica, B.W.I., together with sections on the families of Bolton of Sandford and Gray of Billericay (E.O. Beck, 1933) (printed privately, limited to 70 numbered and signed copies)
- Academical Dress from the Middle Ages to the Present Day, including Lambeth Degrees (W. E. Baxter, Lewes, 1970) (printed privately, limited to 200 numbered and signed copies)
- Frank W. Haycraft, The Degrees and Hoods of the World's Universities and Colleges, 5th edition, revised and enlarged by Frederick R.S. Rogers, Charles A.H. Franklyn, George W. Shaw and Hugh Alexander Boyd (W.E. Baxter, Lewes, 1972) (printed privately, limited to 500 numbered and signed copies)
- The Genealogy of Anne the Quene (Heraldry Today, 1977)
- The ancient family of Francklyn of Chart Sutton, Sutton Valance, Maidstone, Mereworth Castle, Kent (Fotodirect, 1977) (printed privately)
- A genealogical history of the families of Paulet (or Pawlett), Berewe (or Barrow), Lawrence, and Parker (Foundry Press, Bedford, December 1963) (printed privately, limited to 102 numbered and signed copies)
- Supplement to A genealogical history of the families of Paulet (or Pawlett), Berewe (or Barrow), Lawrence, and Parker (W. E. Baxter, Lewes, Sussex, December 1968) (printed privately, limited to 150 numbered and signed copies)
