= Paradise Local Nature Reserve =

Nature reserve in Cambridgeshire, England

Coordinates: 52.194°N 0.1141°E

Paradise
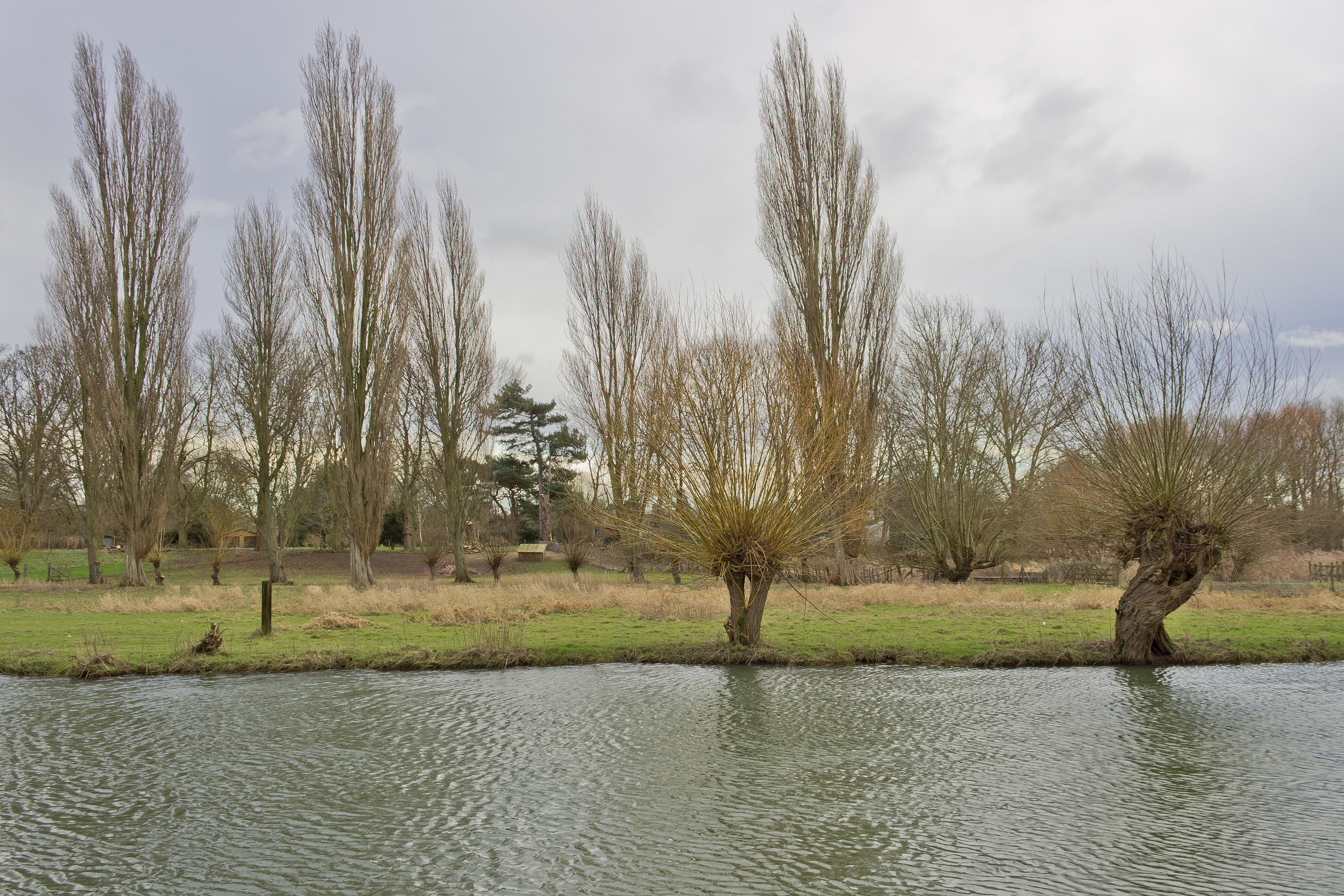
- The River Cam and Paradise Local Nature Reserve
- Interactive map of Paradise
- Type: Local Nature Reserve
- Location: Newnham, Cambridge
- OS grid: TL 446 572
- Area: 2.2 hectares (5.4 acres)
- Manager: Cambridge City Council

Paradise is a Local Nature Reserve in Newnham, a suburb in the south of Cambridge, UK. It is owned and managed by Cambridge City Council.

== Geography ==
This site of 5.4 acres (2.2 ha) on the west bank of the River Cam has marshland and wet woodland with mature willows. Upstream is Skaters' Meadow, managed by the local Wildlife Trust, and downstream is the Sheep's Green and Coe Fen Local Nature Reserve. Flora include butterbur, and the reserve has the uncommon musk beetle, which lays its eggs in the willows.

There is access by a road from the junction of Newnham Road and Barton Road.

== History ==
Today, the name Paradise designates the nature reserve adjoining Owlstone Croft, but formerly it embraced the whole area up to the Lammas Land. There were once tennis courts known as the Paradise Courts on the University Hockey Ground. This hockey ground, located at the junction of Barton Road and Grantchester Street, has since been developed for housing. References to Paradise go back a long way. The earliest mention of bathing in Cambridge records that in 1567 the son of Walter Haddon, while at King's College, was drowned "while washing himself in a Place in the river Cham called Paradise", and William Stukeley, the eighteenth century antiquary, when at Corpus College in 1704 wrote: "I used to frequent, among other lads, the river in Sheep's Green, and learnt to swim in Freshman's and Soph's Pools, as they are called, and sometimes in Paradise, reckoning it a Beneficial Exercise". And it was here, in 1811, that Byron's brilliant friend Matthews became entangled in weeds and was drowned. The larger area now called Owlstone Croft was formerly called Paradise Garden. In 1740 it was taken over by Mr Rowe, who had introduced into Cornwall a system of forcing early vegetables for the London market, and here he produced them in a scientific way. His son Richard became associated with a Dutch bulb grower, outstripped all competitors in the production of beautiful flowers, and invented the hyacinth glass for growing bulbs in water only.
