= The Old Vicarage, Grantchester =

1912 poem by Rupert Brooke

"The Old Vicarage, Grantchester" is a light poem by the English Georgian poet Rupert Brooke (1887–1915), written in Berlin in 1912. Initially titled "The Sentimental Exile", Brooke, with help from his friend Edward Marsh, gave it the title by which it is now known.

The title refers to the Old Vicarage, a house Brooke briefly lived in the village of Grantchester near Cambridge. The poem's references can be overly obscure because of the many specific Cambridgeshire locations (such as "Haslingfield and Coton") and English traditions to which the poem refers. Some, including George Orwell, have seen it as sentimentally nostalgic, while others have recognised its satiric and sometimes cruel humour.

Using octosyllabics—a metre Brooke often employed—Brooke writes of Grantchester and other nearby villages. It is very much a poem of "place": the place where Brooke composed the work, Berlin and the Café des Westens, and the contrast of that German world ("Here am I, sweating, sick, and hot") with his home in England. Yet it is more than just the longing of an exile for his home, nostalgically imagined. The landscape of Cambridgeshire is reproduced in the poem, but Brooke, the academic, populates this English world with allusions and references from history and myth. He compares the countryside to a kind of Greek Arcadia, home to nymphs and fauns, and refers to such famous literary figures as Lord Byron, Geoffrey Chaucer, and Tennyson. Homesick for England, a land "Where men with Splendid Hearts may go", it is Grantchester, in particular, that he desires. The poem ends with the specificity of place, referring to the Church of St Andrew and St Mary and the tea garden known as The Orchard.

== Legacy ==
=== Landmarks ===
The house of Old Vicarage now has a statue of Brooke by Paul Day, which was unveiled by Margaret Thatcher in 2006.

=== Musical settings ===
Charles Ives set a portion of the poem to music in 1921.

=== Quotes ===
The final two lines of the poem are quoted Sinclair Lewis's novel It Can't Happen Here (1935) and in Frank Muir and Denis Norden's comedy sketch Balham, Gateway to the South (1949).

The Greek phrase εἴθε γενοίμην (formally "would I were", or in more modern idiom, "I wish I was") from the poem is quoted by Patrick Leigh Fermor in Iain Moncrieffe's essay for the epilogue to W. Stanley Moss's Ill Met by Moonlight (1950), as well as in John Betjeman's poem "The Olympic Girl" (1954).

=== Titles ===
Iris Murdoch's novel An Unofficial Rose (1962) and the Dad's Army episode "Is There Honey Still for Tea?" (1975) take their titles from phrases in the poem.
