= Grantchester =

Village and civil parish in Cambridgeshire, England

Coordinates: 52.179°N 0.095°E

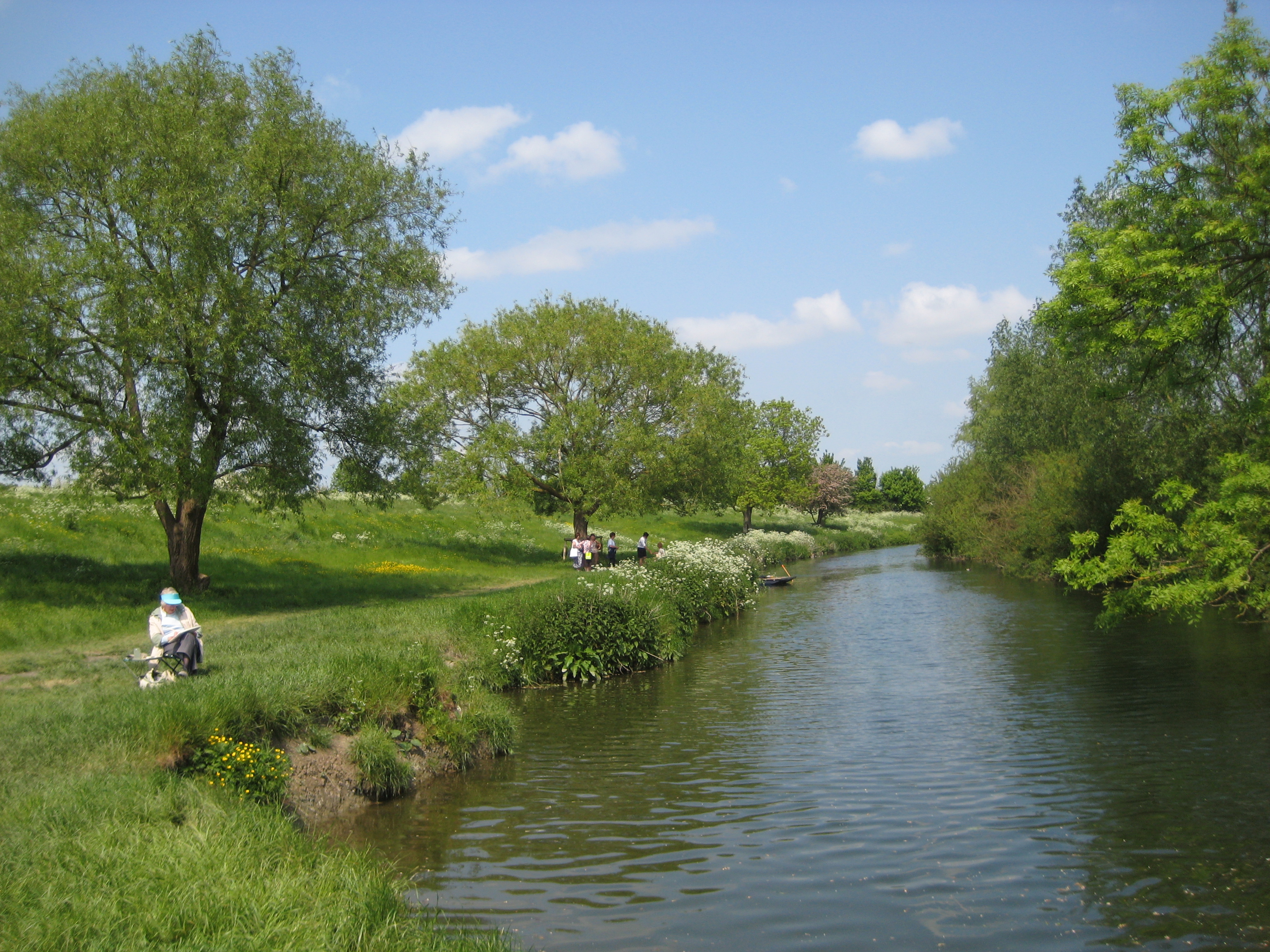
- The banks of the River Cam at Grantchester (May 2008)

- Location within Cambridgeshire
- Interactive map of Grantchester
- Population: 540 (2011 Census)
- OS grid reference: TL432555
- District: South Cambridgeshire
- Shire county: Cambridgeshire
- Region: East
- Country: England
- Sovereign state: United Kingdom
- Post town: CAMBRIDGE
- Postcode district: CB3
- Dialling code: 01223
- Police: Cambridgeshire
- Fire: Cambridgeshire
- Ambulance: East of England
- UK Parliament: South Cambridgeshire

Grantchester (UK: /ˈɡrɑːntʃɪstər/) is a village and civil parish, on the River Cam and Granta river in South Cambridgeshire, England. It lies about two miles (3 km) south of Cambridge.

== Name ==
The village of Grantchester is listed in the 1086 Domesday Book as Grantesete and Grauntsethe. Before, it is also mentioned briefly in book IV, chapter 19 of Bede's Ecclesiastical History of the English People. John de Grauntsete, a lawyer who had a successful career as a judge in Ireland, was born in Grantchester, c. 1270, and took his surname from his birthplace. The present name derives from the common Old English suffix -ceaster (variously developed as "-cester", "-caster", and -"chester"), used in names of forts or fortified cities throughout England.

Grantchester is sometimes identified as the Cair Grauth ("Fort Granta") listed in the History of the Britons among the 28 cities of Britain, but the Roman Duroliponte and subsequent major British and Saxon settlements in the area were at Castle Hill in Cambridge, whose Old English name was Grantabrycge. The confusion arises from the lower stretches of the Granta having been renamed the Cam after the city.

== Overview ==
Grantchester is said to have the world's highest concentration of Nobel Prize winners, most of these presumably being current or retired academics from the nearby University of Cambridge. Students and tourists often travel from Cambridge by punt to picnic in the meadows or take tea at The Orchard. In 1897, a group of Cambridge students persuaded the owner of Orchard House to serve them tea in its apple orchard, and this became a regular practice. Lodgers at Orchard House included the Edwardian poet Rupert Brooke, who later moved next door to the Old Vicarage. In 1912, while in Berlin, he wrote a poem of homesickness entitled "The Old Vicarage, Grantchester". The house is currently the home of the Cambridge scientist Mary Archer. Grantchester has been the home since 1969 of the sculptor Helaine Blumenfeld OBE.

The footpath to Cambridge that runs beside Grantchester Meadows is nicknamed the Grantchester Grind. Grantchester Grind is the title of a 1995 comic novel written by Tom Sharpe. Further upstream is Byron's Pool, named after Lord Byron, who is said (by Brooke, at least) to have swum there. The pool is now below a modern weir where the Bourn Brook flows into the River Cam. Byron's Pool is a Local Nature Reserve.

== In popular culture ==
Grantchester is the subject of "Grantchester Meadows" (composed and performed by Roger Waters) a song by Pink Floyd, with the village being home to band member David Gilmour. A few years later, Gilmour also wrote a song about Grantchester Meadows, called "Fat Old Sun". The village is also the setting for James Runcie's sleuth novels The Grantchester Mysteries, adapted as an ITV drama titled Grantchester shown in the UK from autumn 2014 and filmed on location in Grantchester.

The village is the subject of Rupert Brooke's poem "The Old Vicarage, Grantchester".

== Grantchester Church ==
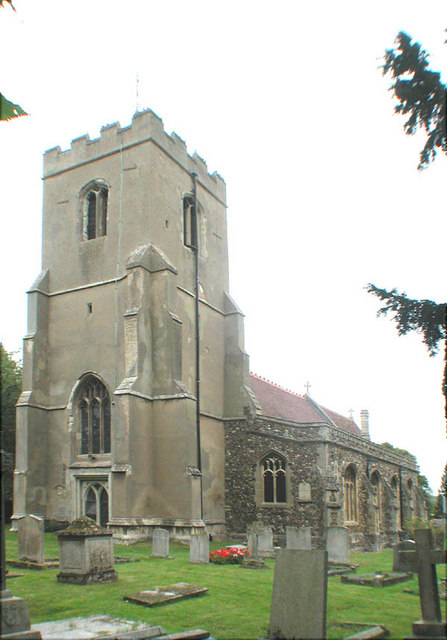
St Mary and St Andrew Church

The oldest parts of the Church of St Andrew and St Mary (Church of England) date from the twelfth century. The chancel is mid-fourteenth century and the tower is late-fourteenth or early fifteenth century. The porch is sixteenth century. The nave was extensively restored in 1876–1877. The church is a Grade II* listed building. Rachel Rosborough became vicar in 2017.

=== Graveyard ===
The church is surrounded by a graveyard, where the burials include:

- Constantine Walter Benson (1909–1982), ornithologist and author
- Francis Burkitt (1864–1935), theologian
- Anne Clough (1820–1892), the first principal of Newnham College, Cambridge
- Dermot Freyer (1883-1970), Irish author and political activist
- Irving B. Fritz (1927–1996), physiologist and endocrinologist
- Sir James Gray (1891–1975), zoologist
- Dame Elizabeth Hill (1900–1996), academic linguist
- Sir Robert Yewdall Jennings (1913–2004), President of the International Court of Justice.
- Frank Kingdon-Ward (1885–1958), botanist and explorer
- Sir Desmond Lee (1908–1993), classical scholar, headmaster of Clifton College and Winchester College, President of Hughes Hall, Cambridge.

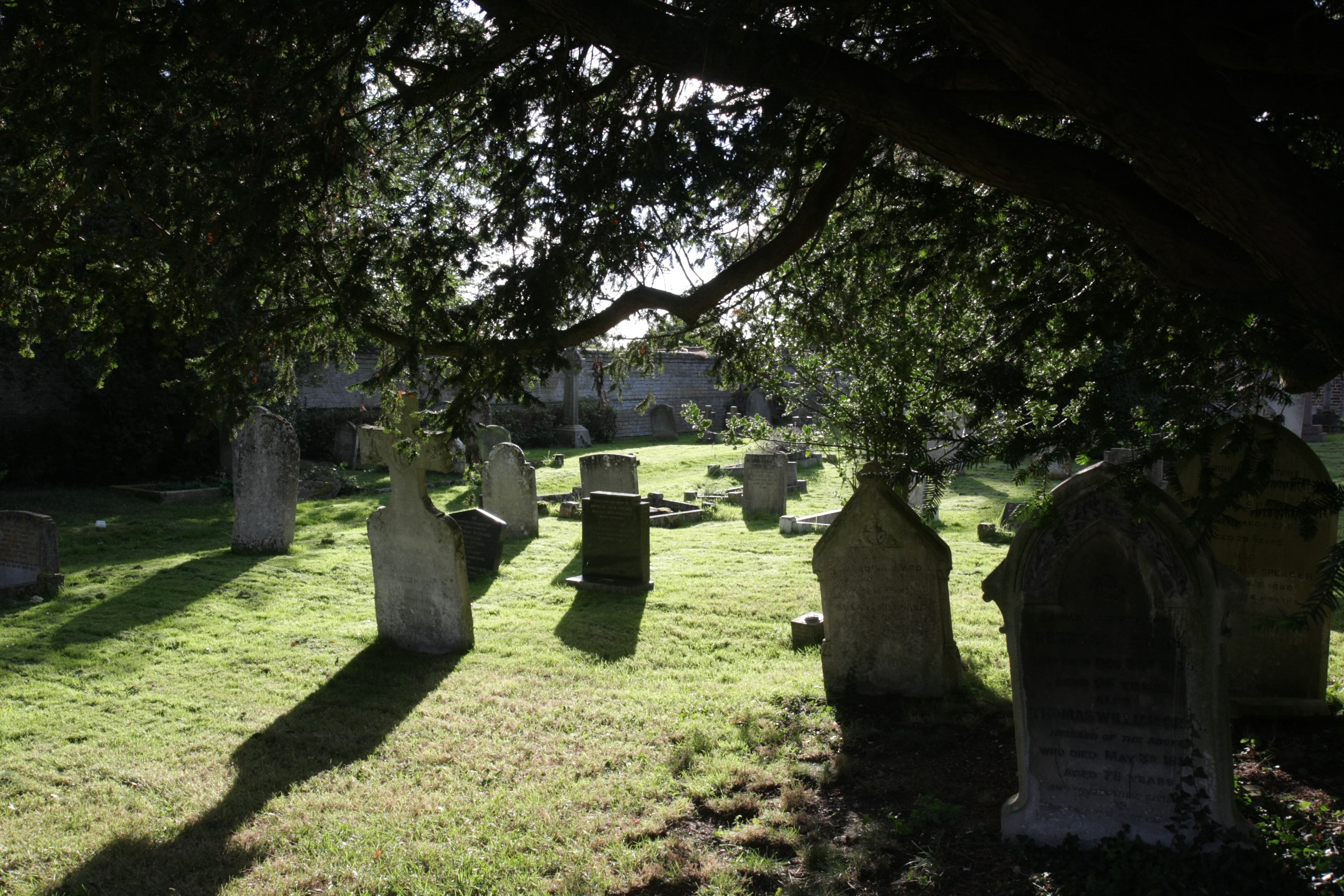
Grantchester Graveyard

- J. Rawson Lumby (1831–1895), theologian
- Arthur Henry Mann (1850–1929), organist and composer of hymn tunes
- Michael McCrum (1924–2005), Vice-Chancellor of the University of Cambridge, Master of Corpus Christi College, Cambridge, and Headmaster of Tonbridge School and Eton College.
- Jean Purdy (1945-1985), embryologist and co-founder of the Bourn Hall Clinic with Patrick Steptoe and Robert Edwards
- G. W. Shaw (1928–2006), biologist and expert on academic dress
- Robert Stevenson (1905–1986), film writer and director
- Charles Swainson (1820–1887), theologian
- David J. Thouless (1934–2019), physicist
- Robert H. Thouless (1894–1984), psychologist and parapsychologist

It also contains the Commonwealth war graves of three British Army soldiers of the First World War and an airman of the Second World War.

== Barrel race ==
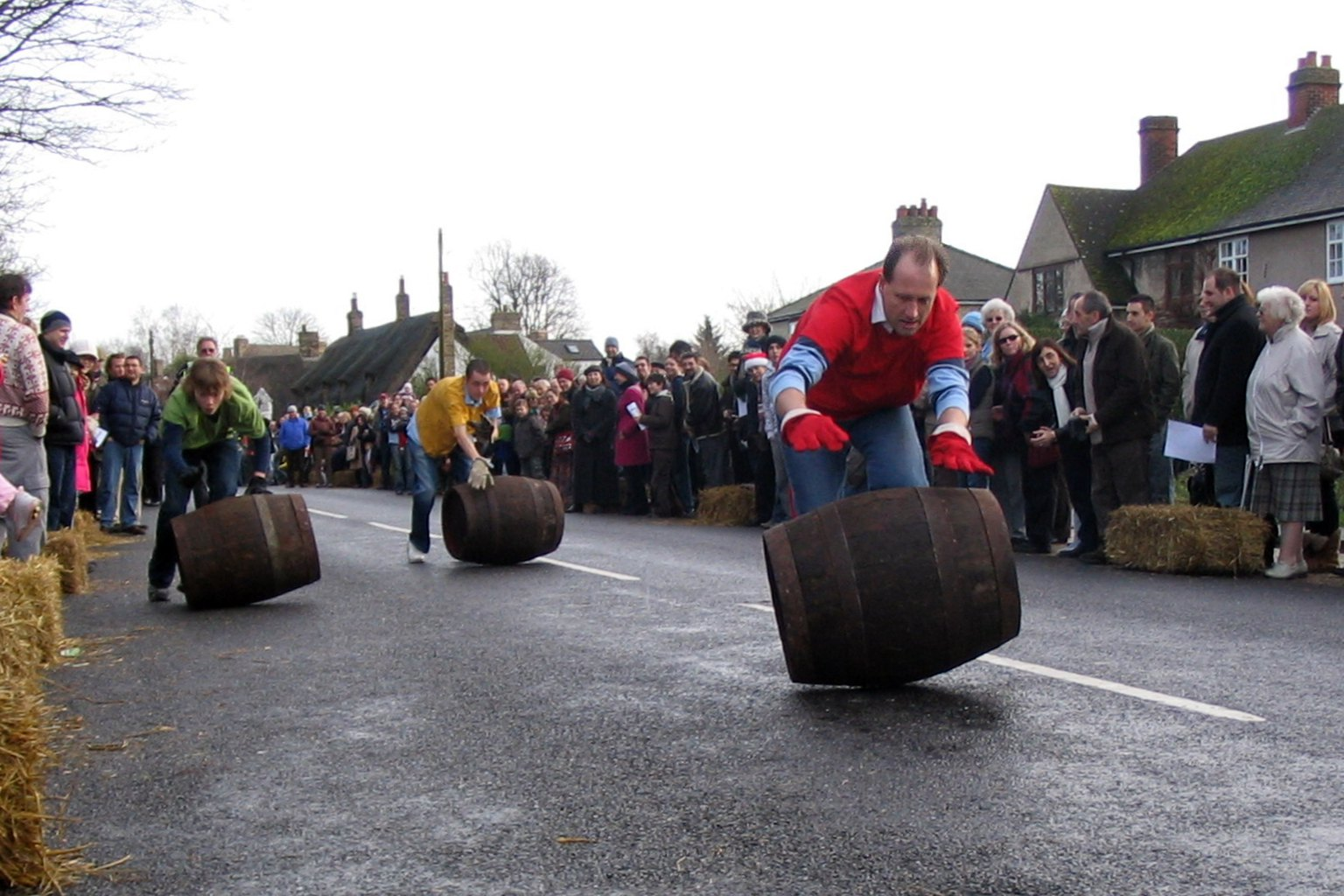
A Grantchester barrel race in 2007

Every year on Boxing Day (26 December), Grantchester holds an inter-village barrel race which is around 40 minutes long and ends with a hog roast at the Rupert Brooke pub. This tradition dates back to the 1960s.

== Legends ==
An underground passage is said to run from the Old Manor house to King's College Chapel two miles (3 km) away. It was said that a fiddler who offered to follow the passage set off playing his fiddle; the music became fainter and fainter, until it was heard no more and the fiddler was never seen or heard of again. This story is told of many supposed tunnels. On a 17th-century map of Grantchester, one of the fields is called Fiddler's Close.

== Gallery ==
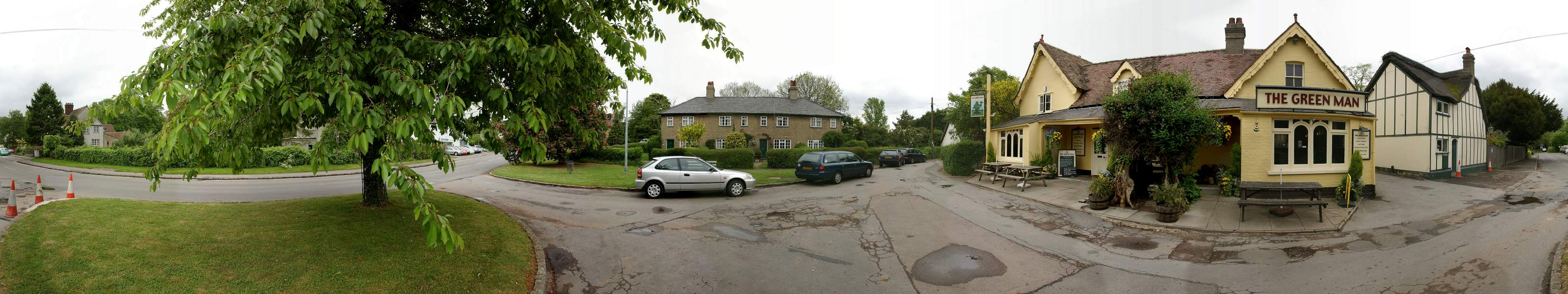
The Green Man

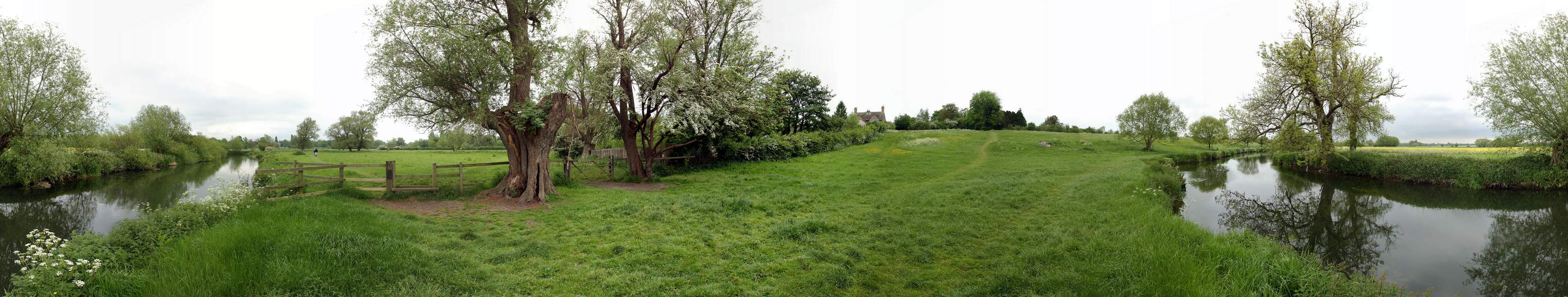
Grantchester Meadows
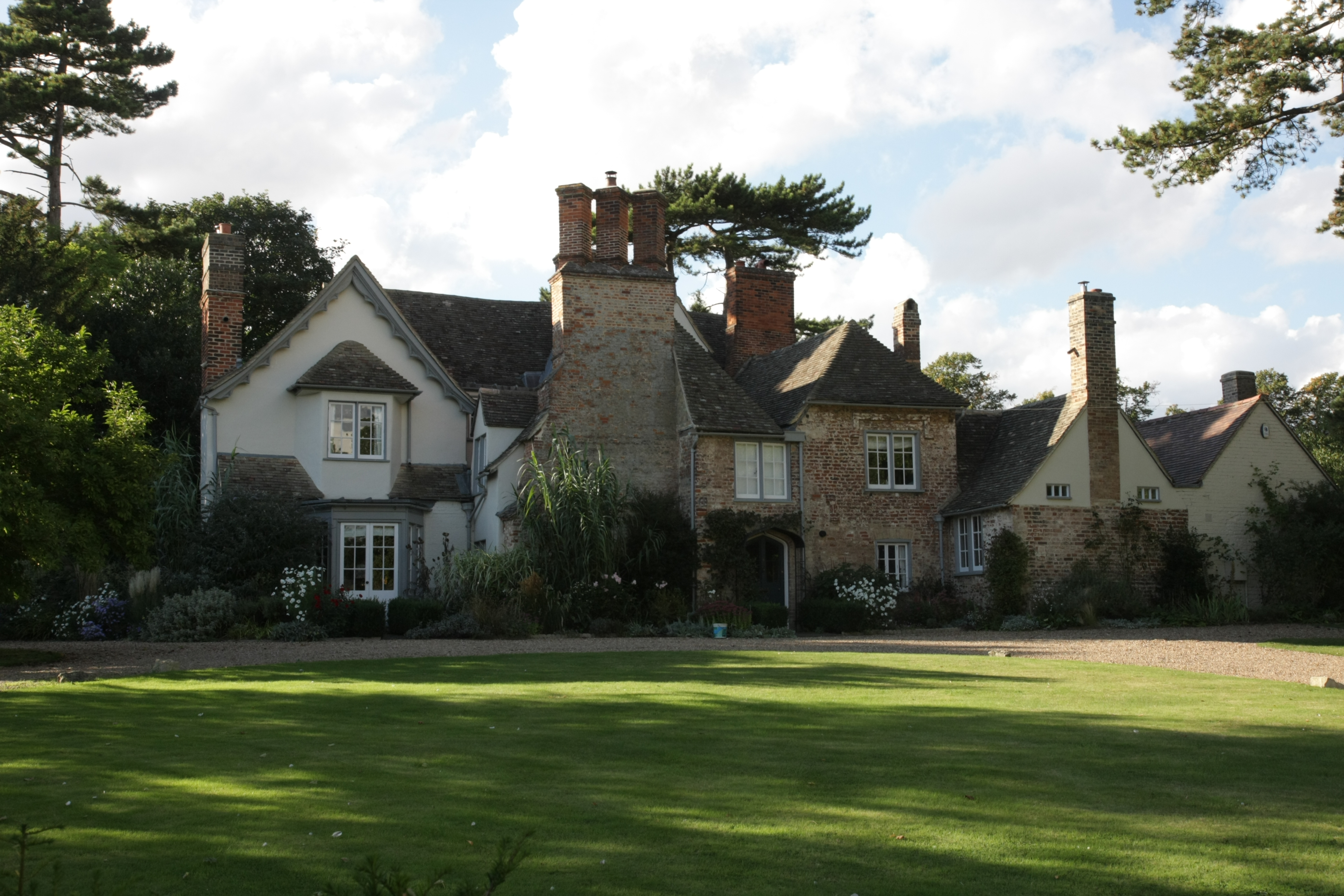
Manor Farmhouse

Grantchester Meadows sign

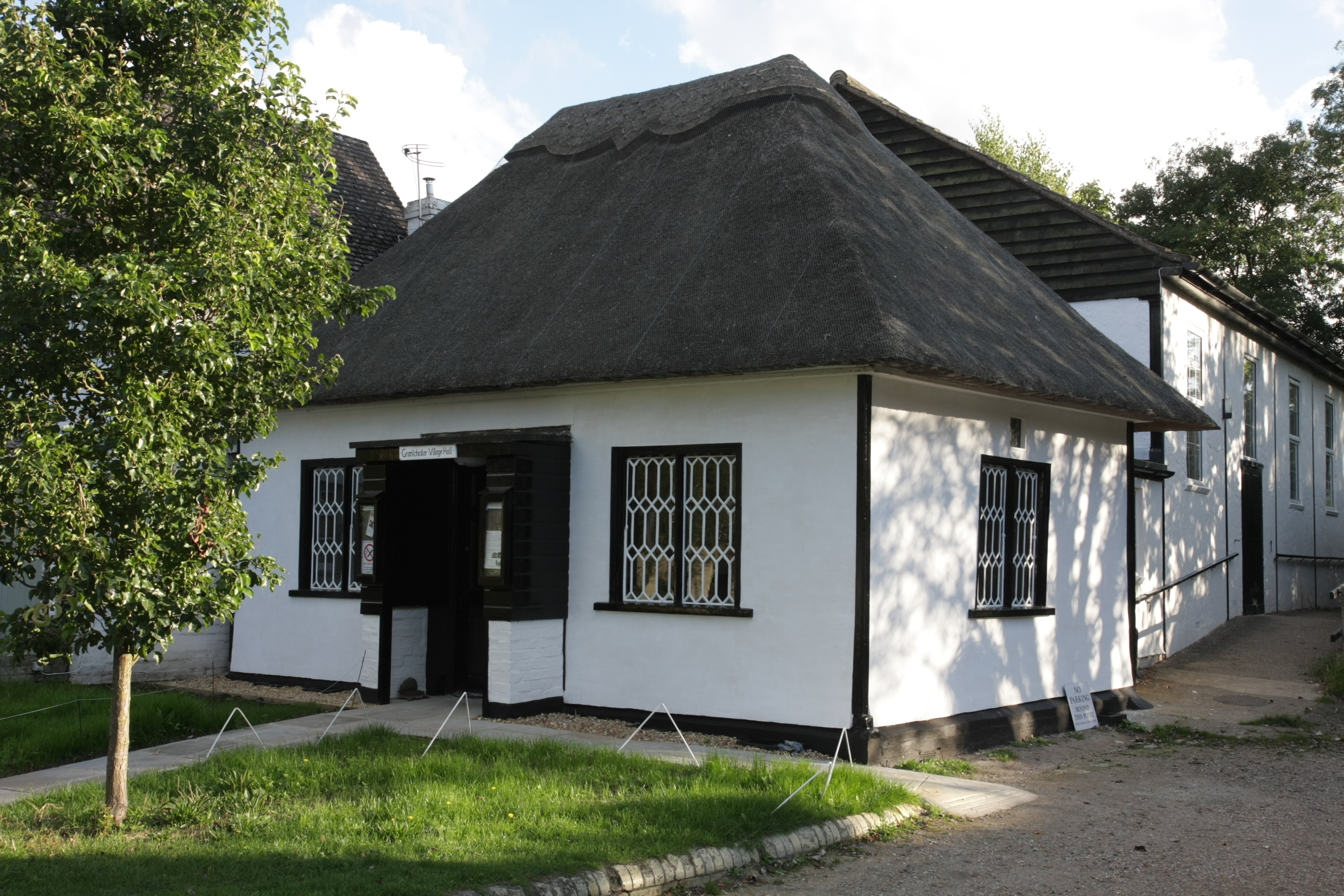
Grantchester Village Hall
