= Church of St Andrew and St Mary, Grantchester =

Coordinates: 52.17879485582091°N 0.09570074369802553°E

Church of St Andrew and St Mary
- The Parish Church of Saint Andrew and Saint Mary
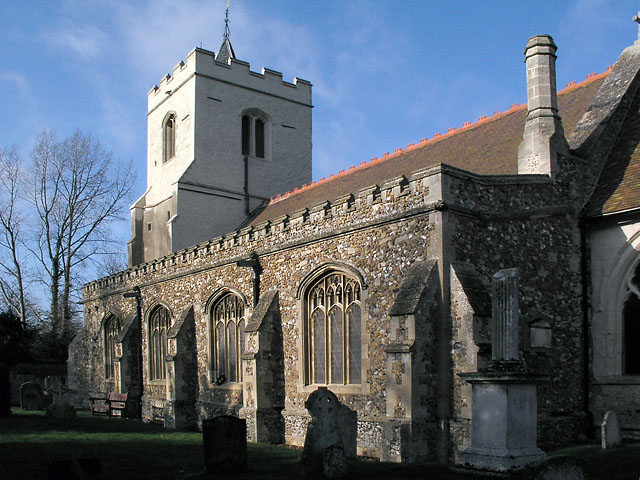
- The church in 2005

- Location in Cambridgeshire
- Location: Grantchester, Cambridgeshire
- Country: England
- Denomination: Church of England
- Website: church.grantchester.org.uk

History
- Status: Parish church
- Founded: 12th century
- Dedication: Virgin Mary; Andrew the Apostle

Architecture
- Functional status: Active
- Heritage designation: Grade II
- Designated: 31 August 1962
- Architectural type: Church
- Style: Gothic

Administration
- Diocese: Ely
- Deanery: Cambridge South Deanery
- Parish: Grantchester

Clergy
- Bishop: Bishop of Ely - vacant
- Vicar: Jim Robinson

The Church of St Andrew and St Mary is a parish church of the Church of England located in the village of Grantchester, Cambridgeshire, England.

== History ==
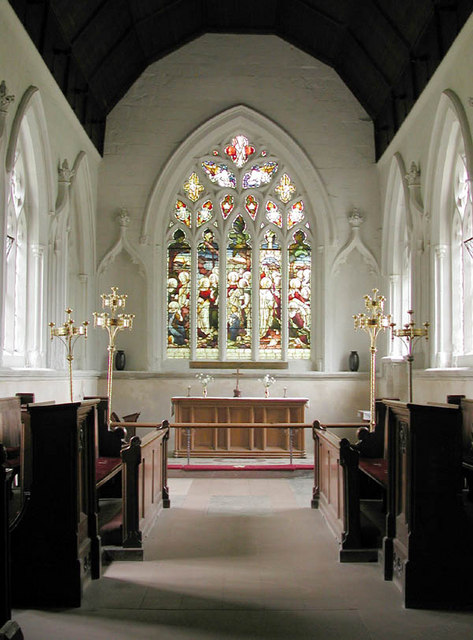
Interior of the church

The oldest part of the current church building dates from the 12th century. The chancel was built in the 14th century, while the nave and bell tower date from the 15th century. It was constructed using clunch and fieldstone. There was also a small transseptal chapel built in the 1400s but which was demolished in the 18th century. A 19th-century restoration saw the construction of a south aisle in the 1870s and an extensive restoration of the nave between 1876 and 1877. The tower includes three bells. Corpus Christi College, Cambridge has been a patron of the church since 1352.

== Interior ==
The church has several stained glass windows which mainly date from the 19th century. There is a Norman baptismal font, and the 17th century pulpit is believed to have come from the chapel of Corpus Christi College,. The organ was built in 1851.

== Popular culture ==
The church is used in the ITV drama titled Grantchester shown in the UK from autumn 2014 and filmed on location in Grantchester. The drama is the adaptation of James Runcie's sleuth novels The Grantchester Mysteries.
