= The Grantchester Mysteries =

Series of crime fiction books of short stories by James Runcie

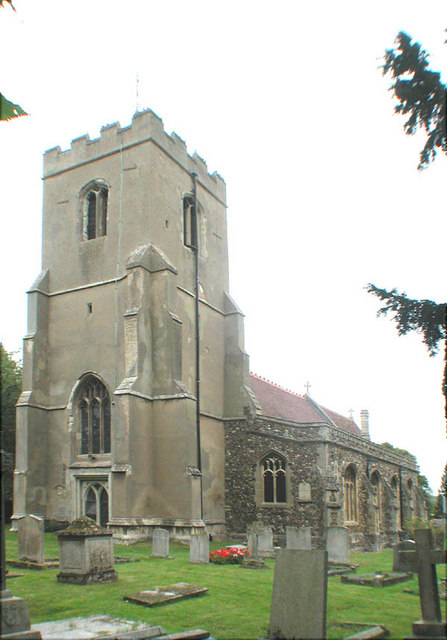
St Andrew & St Mary Church in the village of Grantchester, which features in The Grantchester Mysteries short stories.

The Grantchester Mysteries is a series of cosy mystery crime fiction books of short stories by the British author James Runcie, set in the years during and after the 1950s in Grantchester, a village near Cambridge in England. The books feature the clergyman-detective Canon Sidney Chambers, an Honorary Canon of Ely Cathedral.

== History ==
The first volume in the series, Sidney Chambers and the Shadow of Death, was published in 2012. The book comprises six short standalone mysteries. The second, Sidney Chambers and the Perils of the Night, was published in 2013.

== Titles ==
The books in the series include:

1. Sidney Chambers and the Shadow of Death (2012)
2. Sidney Chambers and The Perils of the Night (2013)
3. Sidney Chambers and The Problem of Evil (2014)
4. Sidney Chambers and The Forgiveness of Sins (2015)
5. Sidney Chambers and The Dangers of Temptation (2016)
6. Sidney Chambers and the Persistence of Love (2017)
7. The Road to Grantchester (2019)

A total of seven books have been written so far, with the latest being a prequel. The series was inspired by James Runcie's father, a former Archbishop of Canterbury, Robert Runcie.

== TV series ==
In 2014, some of The Grantchester Mysteries short stories were turned into an ITV drama titled Grantchester. Filmed on location in Grantchester, Cambridge, and London, the initial six-part series was shown in the UK in Autumn 2014. A second series was broadcast in 2016, and has been ongoing since.
