= Rupert Brooke =

English poet (1887–1915)

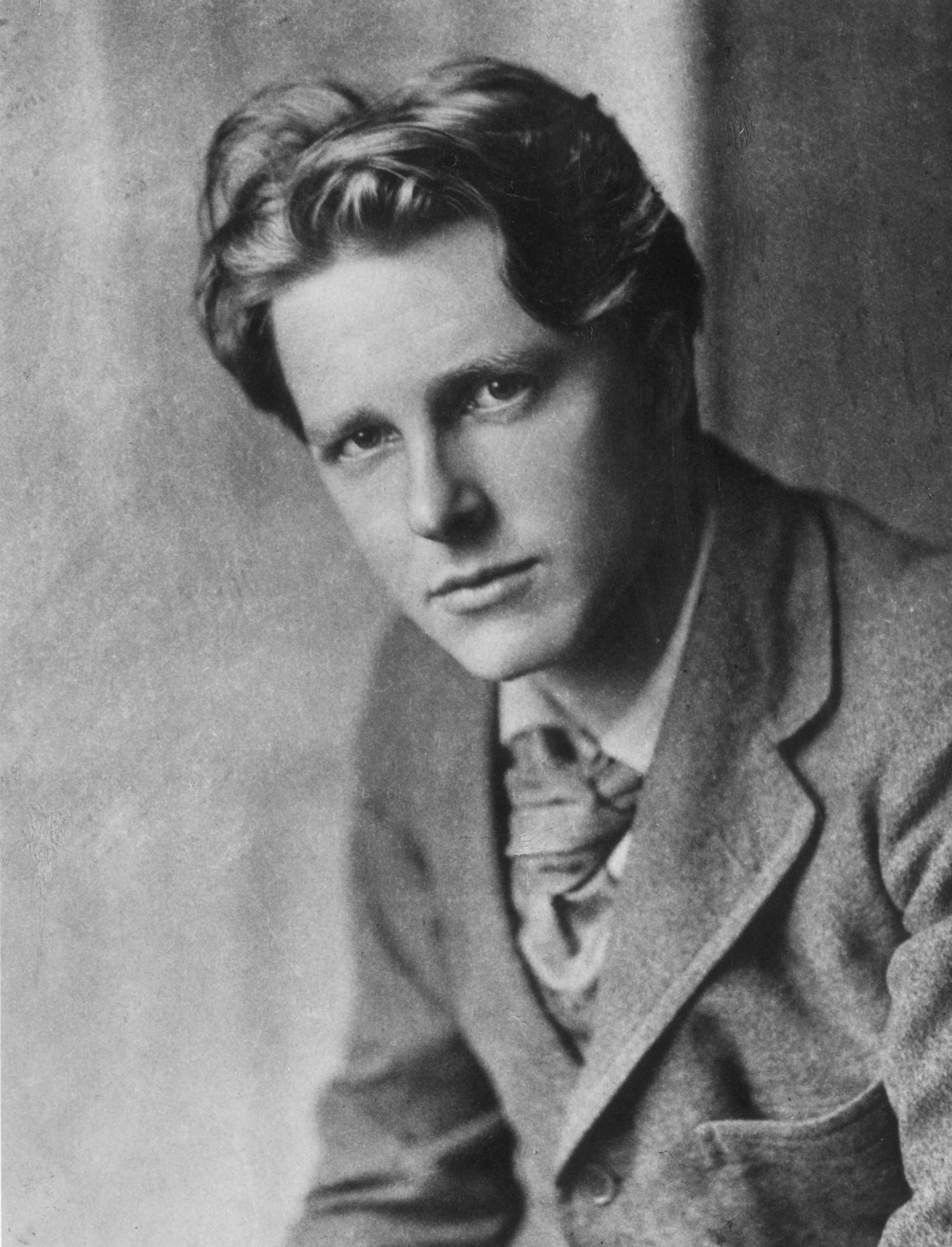
- Brooke c. 1913
- Born: Rupert Chawner Brooke; 3 August 1887; Rugby, Warwickshire, England
- Died: 23 April 1915 (aged 27); Skyros, Greece
- Education: Rugby School; King's College, Cambridge (fellow)
- Occupation: Poet
- Employer: Sidgwick & Jackson (publisher)

Signature
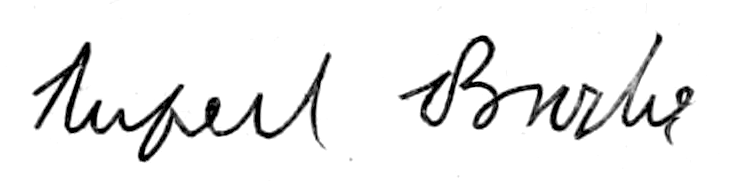

Rupert Chawner Brooke (3 August 1887 – 23 April 1915) was an English poet known for his idealistic war sonnets written during the First World War, such as "The Dead" and "The Soldier". He was also known for his boyish good looks, which were said to have prompted the Irish poet W. B. Yeats to describe him as "the handsomest young man in England". He died of septicaemia following a mosquito bite whilst aboard a French hospital ship moored off the island of Skyros in the Aegean Sea.

== Early life ==
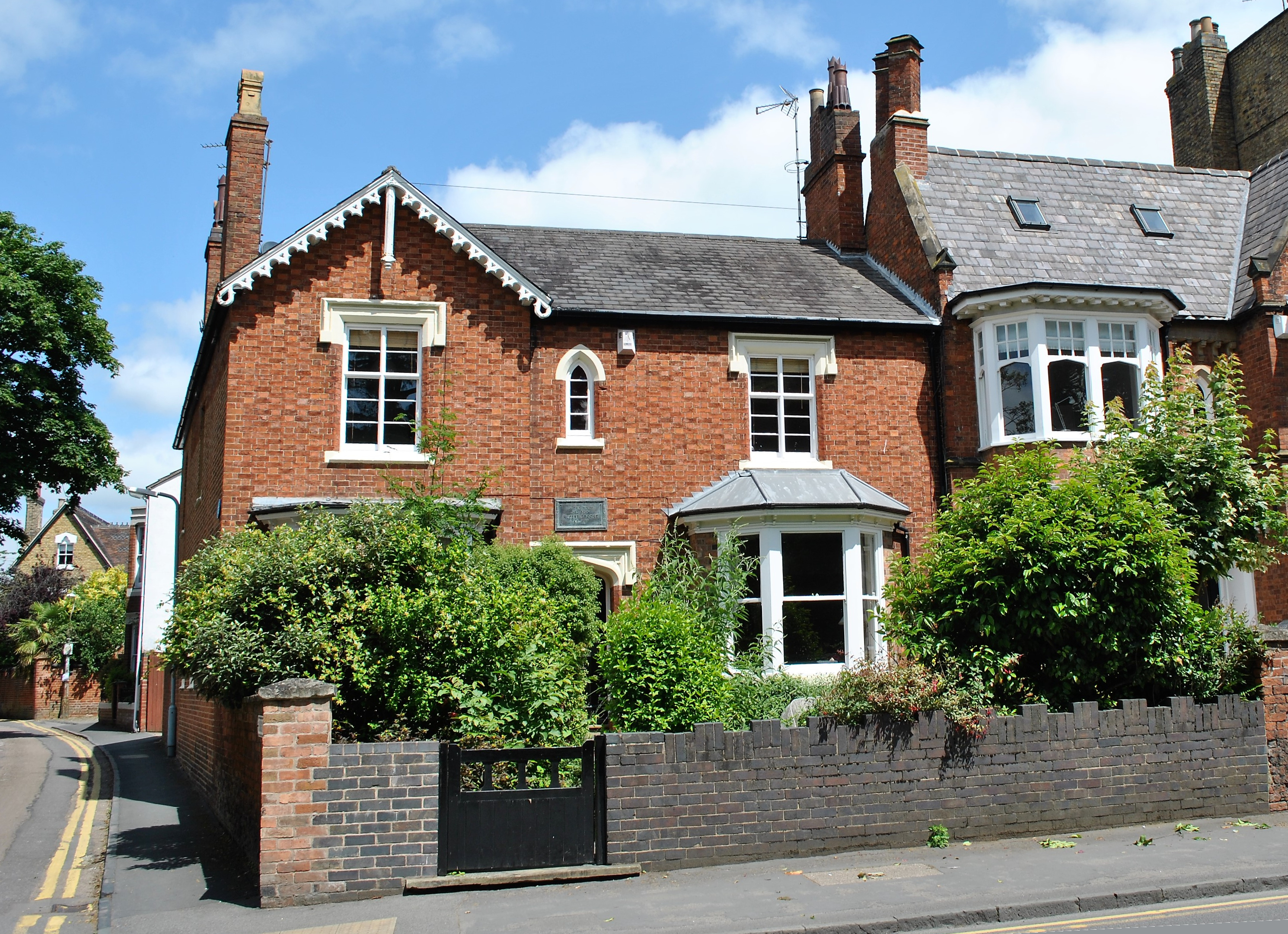
Brooke's birthplace in Rugby in 2017

Brooke was born at 5 Hillmorton Road, Rugby, Warwickshire, and named after a great-grandfather on his mother's side, Rupert Chawner (1750–1836), a distinguished doctor descended from the regicide Thomas Chaloner (the middle name has however sometimes been erroneously given as "Chaucer"). He was the third of four children of William Parker "Willie" Brooke, a schoolmaster, and Ruth Mary Brooke (née Cotterill), a school matron. Both parents were working at Fettes College in Edinburgh when they met. They married on 18 December 1879. William Parker Brooke had to resign after the couple wed, as there was no accommodation there for married masters. The couple then moved to Rugby in Warwickshire, where Rupert's father became Master of School Field House at Rugby School a month later. His eldest brother was Richard England "Dick" Brooke (1881–1907); his sister Edith Marjorie Brooke was born in 1885 and died the following year, and his youngest brother was William Alfred Cotterill "Podge" Brooke (1891–1915).

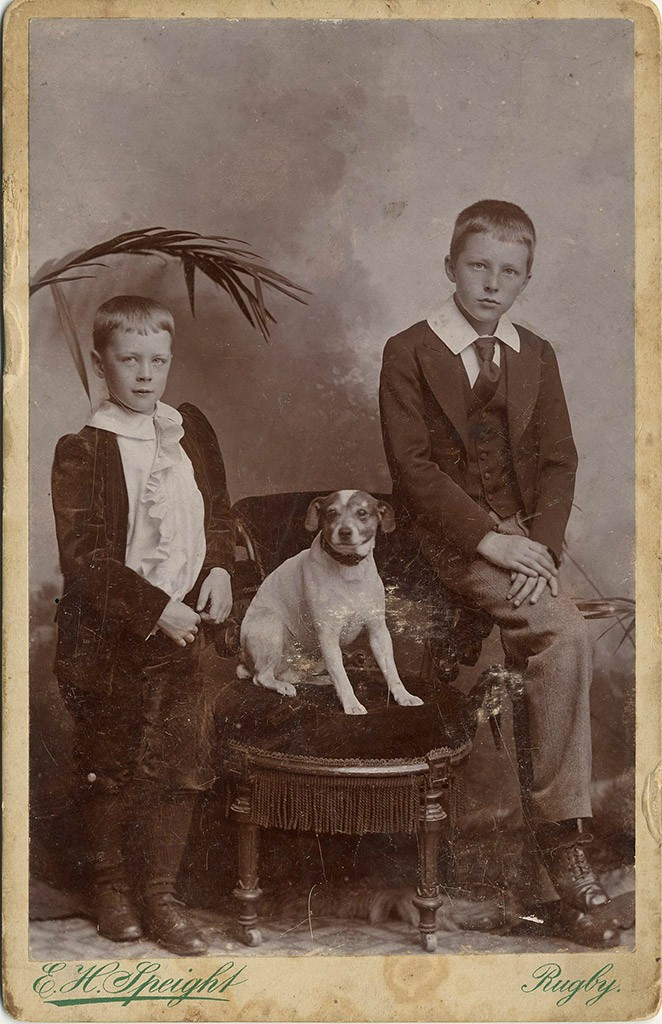
Childhood photograph of Rupert Brooke (right) with his younger brother Alfred Brooke (left) and dog Trim (1898)

Brooke attended preparatory (prep) school locally at Hillbrow, and then went on to Rugby School. At Rugby, he was romantically involved with fellow pupils Charles Lascelles, Denham Russell-Smith and Michael Sadleir. In 1904 he wrote in his poem "From a New Boy" of his playing rugby football at the School ("When first I played I nearly died"). In 1905, he became friends with St. John Lucas, who thereafter became something of a mentor to him.

In October 1906, he went up to King's College, Cambridge, to study classics. There, he became a member of the Apostles, was elected as president of the university Fabian Society, helped found the Marlowe Society drama club and acted, including in the Cambridge Greek Play. The friendships he made at school and university set the course for his adult life, and many of the people he met—including George Mallory—fell under his spell. Virginia Woolf told Vita Sackville-West that she had gone skinny-dipping with Brooke in a moonlit pool when they were in Cambridge together. In 1907, his elder brother Dick died of pneumonia at age 26. Brooke planned to put his studies on hold to help his parents cope with the loss of his brother, but they insisted he return to university.

There is a blue plaque at The Orchard, Grantchester, where he lived and wrote. It reads: "Rupert Brooke Poet & Soldier 1887–1915 Lived and wrote at The Orchard 1909–1911, and at The Old Vicarage 1911–1912".

== Life and career ==
Brooke made friends among the Bloomsbury group of writers, some of whom admired his talent while others were more impressed by his good looks. He also belonged to another literary group known as the Georgian Poets and was one of the most important of the Dymock poets, associated with the Gloucestershire village of Dymock where he spent some time before the war. This group included both Robert Frost and Edward Thomas. He also lived at the Old Vicarage, Grantchester, which stimulated one of his best-known poems, named after the house, written with homesickness while in Berlin in 1912. While travelling in Europe, he prepared a thesis, entitled "John Webster and the Elizabethan Drama", which earned him a fellowship at King's College, Cambridge, in March 1913.

Brooke had his first relationship with Élisabeth van Rysselberghe, daughter of painter Théo van Rysselberghe. They met in 1911 in Munich. His affair with Élisabeth came closest to be consummated than any other he ever had so far. It is possible that the two became lovers in a "complete sense" in May 1913 in Swanley. It was in Munich, where he had met Élisabeth, that a year later he finally succeeded in a sexual liaison with Katherine Laird Cox.

Brooke suffered a severe emotional crisis in 1912, resulting in the breakdown of his long relationship with Ka Cox. Brooke's paranoia that Lytton Strachey had schemed to destroy his relationship with Cox by encouraging her to see Henry Lamb precipitated his break with his Bloomsbury group friends and played a part in his nervous collapse and subsequent rehabilitation trips to Germany.

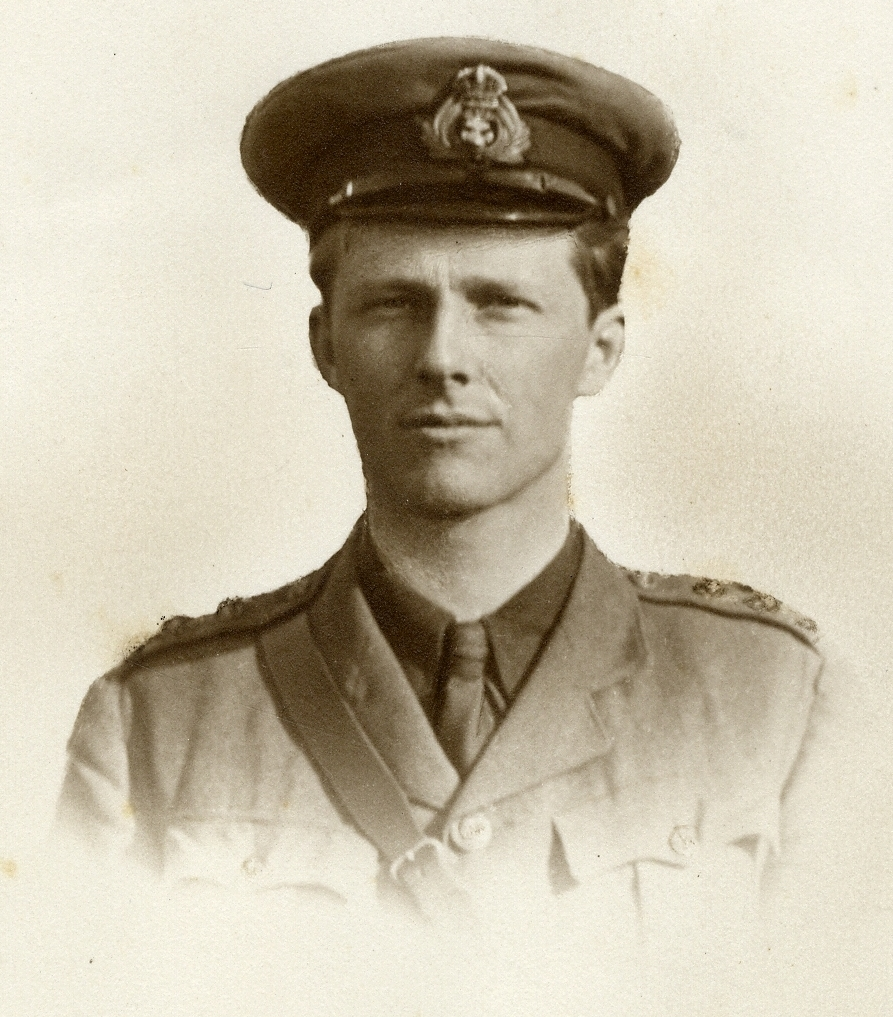
Rupert Brooke as an officer in 1914

As part of his recuperation, Brooke toured the United States and Canada to write travel diaries for The Westminster Gazette. He took the long way home, sailing across the Pacific and staying some months in the South Seas. Much later it was revealed that he may have fathered a daughter with a Tahitian woman named Taatamata with whom he seems to have enjoyed his most complete emotional relationship. Many more people were in love with him. Brooke was romantically involved with the artist Phyllis Gardner and the actress Cathleen Nesbitt, and was once engaged to Noël Olivier, whom he met, when she was aged 15, at the progressive Bedales School.

Brooke's accomplished poetry gained many enthusiasts and followers, and he was taken up by Edward Marsh, who brought him to the attention of Winston Churchill, then First Lord of the Admiralty. He joined the Royal Navy after the outbreak of war in August 1914, and was commissioned into the Royal Naval Volunteer Reserve as a temporary sub-lieutenant shortly after his 27th birthday. Brooke was assigned to the Royal Naval Division, an infantry division consisting of Royal Navy and Royal Marine personnel not needed at sea, and took part in the siege of Antwerp in early October.

Brooke came to public attention as a war poet early the following year, when The Times Literary Supplement published two sonnets ("IV: The Dead" and "V: The Soldier") on 11 March; the latter was then read from the pulpit of St Paul's Cathedral on Easter Sunday (4 April). His most famous collection of poetry, containing all five sonnets, 1914 & Other Poems, was first published in May 1915 and, in testament to his popularity, ran to 11 further impressions that year and by June 1918 had reached its 24th impression, a process undoubtedly fuelled through posthumous interest.

== Death ==
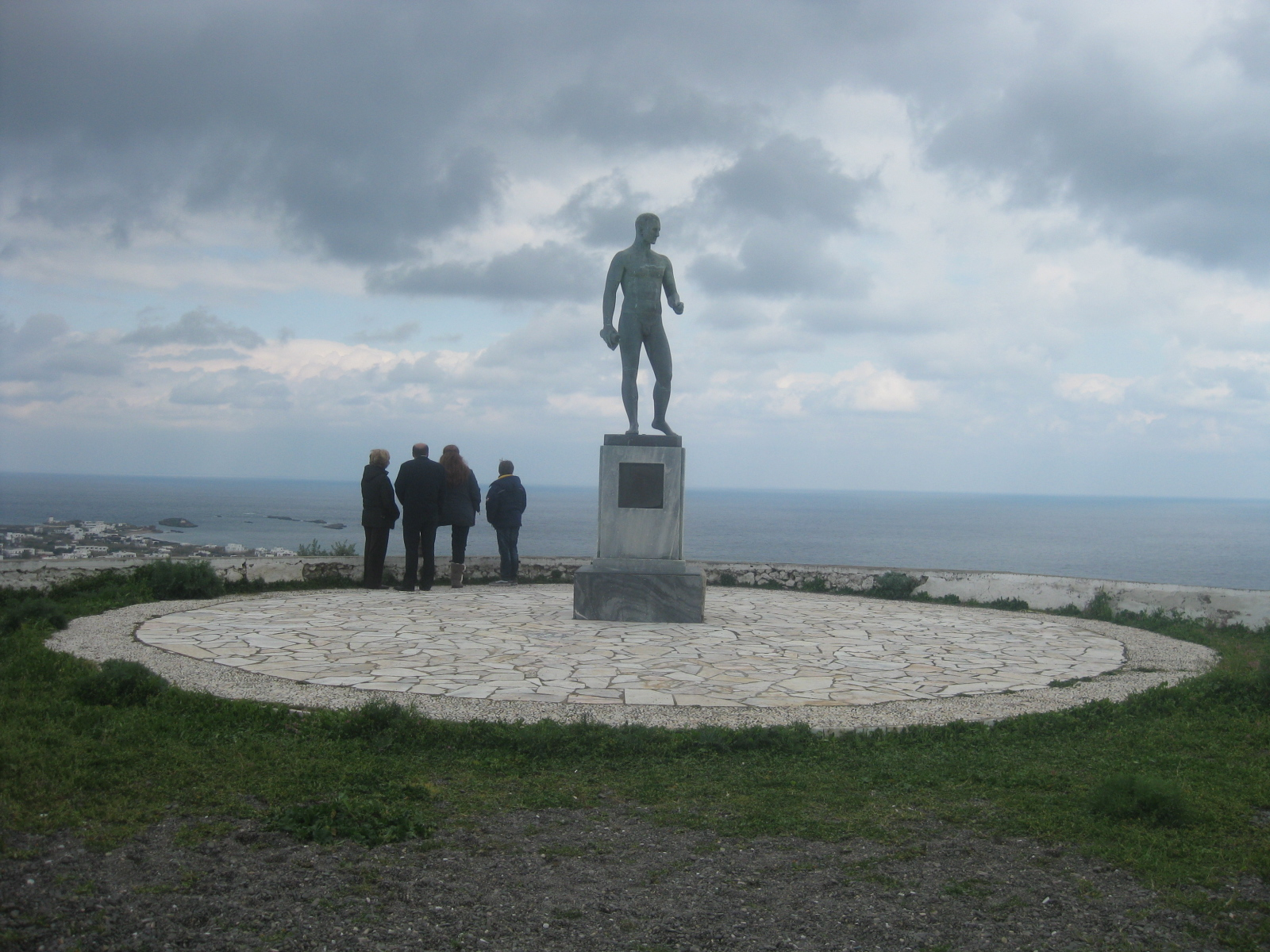
Brooke Square, Skyros

Brooke sailed with the British Mediterranean Expeditionary Force on 28 February 1915, but developed severe gastroenteritis whilst stationed in Egypt followed by streptococcal sepsis from an infected mosquito bite. French surgeons carried out two operations to drain the abscess, but he died of septicaemia at 4:46 pm on 23 April 1915, on the French hospital ship Duguay-Trouin, moored in a bay off the Greek island of Skyros in the Aegean Sea, while on his way to the landings at Gallipoli. He was 27 at the time of his death. As the expeditionary force had orders to depart immediately, Brooke was buried at 11 pm in an olive grove on Skyros. The site was chosen by his close friend, William Denis Browne, who wrote of Brooke's death:

I sat with Rupert. At 4 o’clock he became weaker, and at 4.46 he died, with the sun shining all round his cabin, and the cool sea breeze blowing through the door and the shaded windows. No one could have wished for a quieter or a calmer end than in that lovely bay, shielded by the mountains and fragrant with sage and thyme.

Another friend and war poet, Patrick Shaw-Stewart, assisted at his hurried funeral. His grave remains there still, with a monument erected by his friend Stanley Casson, poet and archaeologist, who, in 1921, published Rupert Brooke and Skyros, a "quiet essay", illustrated with woodcuts by Phyllis Gardner.

Brooke's surviving brother, William Alfred Cotterill Brooke, fell in action on the Western Front on 14 June 1915 as a subaltern with the 1/8th (City of London) of the London Regiment (Post Office Rifles), at the age of 24. He had been in France on active service for nineteen days before his death. His body was buried in Fosse 7 Military Cemetery (Quality Street), Mazingarbe.

In July 1917, Field Marshal Edmund Allenby was informed of the death in action of his son Michael Allenby, leading to Allenby's breakdown in tears in public while he recited a poem by Rupert Brooke.

== Commemorations ==
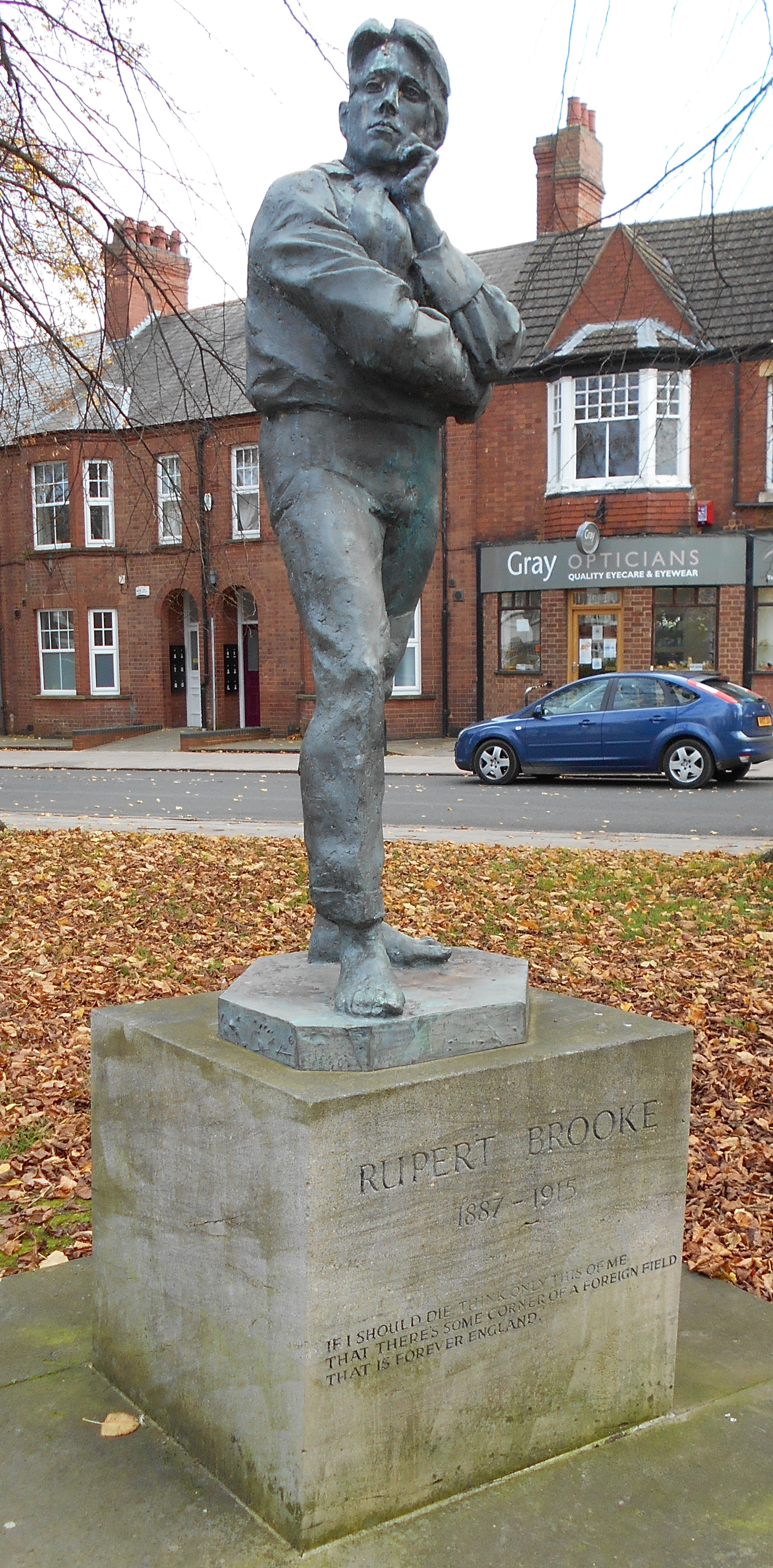
Statue of Brooke in Rugby, by Ivor Roberts-Jones (1988)

On 11 November 1985, Brooke was among 16 First World War poets commemorated on a slate monument unveiled in Poets' Corner in Westminster Abbey. The inscription on the stone was taken from Wilfred Owen's "Preface" to his poems and reads: "My subject is War, and the pity of War. The Poetry is in the pity."

His name is recorded on the village war memorial in Grantchester.

The wooden cross that marked Brooke's grave on Skyros, which was painted and carved with his name, was removed when a permanent memorial was made there. His mother, Mary Ruth Brooke, had the cross brought to Rugby, to the family plot at Clifton Road Cemetery. Because of erosion in the open air, it was removed from the cemetery in 2008 and replaced by a more permanent marker. The Skyros cross is now at Rugby School with the memorials of other Old Rugbeians.

The first stanza of "The Dead" is inscribed onto the base of the Royal Naval Division War Memorial in London.

The Cenotaph in Wellington, New Zealand, has the words from "The Dead", "These laid the world away; poured out the red/Sweet wine of youth; gave up the years to be/Of work and joy, and that unhoped serene,/That men call age; and those who would have been,/Their sons, they gave, their immortality." inscribed on the pediment.

In 1988, the sculptor Ivor Roberts-Jones was commissioned to produce a statue of Brooke at Regent Place, a small triangular open space, in his birth town of Rugby, Warwickshire. The statue was unveiled by Mary Archer.

A 2006 portrait statue of Rupert Brooke in army uniform by Paul Day stands in the front garden of The Old Vicarage, Grantchester.

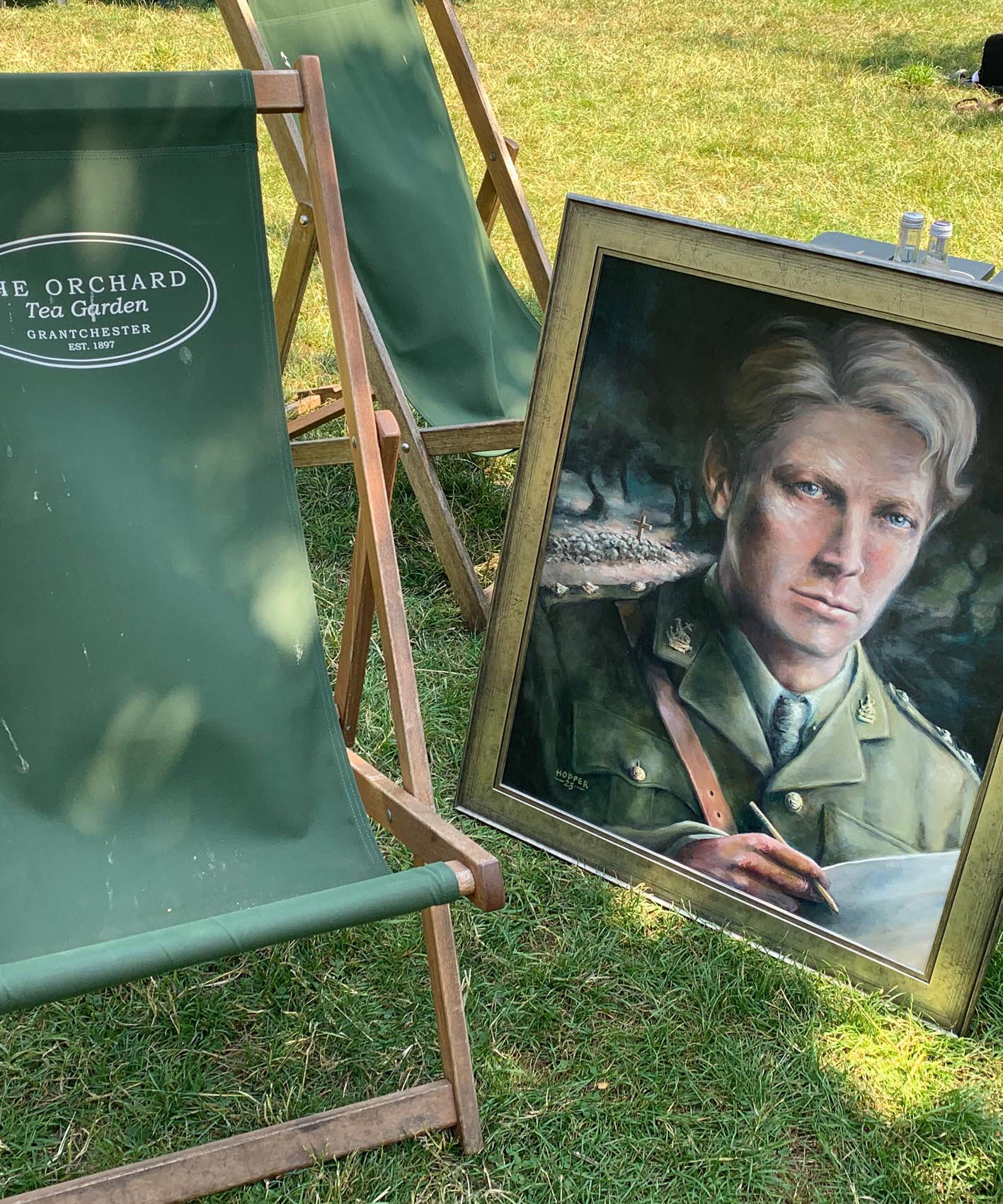
Oil painting of Rupert Brooke at The Orchard Tea Rooms by Stephen Hopper (2023)

In 2023, artist Stephen Hopper painted a portrait in oils celebrating Brooke's life and featuring references to his grave on Skyros and his service with the Hood Battalion, part of the 63rd (Royal Naval) Division. (See detail on the pencil poised in his hand and the blank sheet of paper, symbolising work unfulfilled).

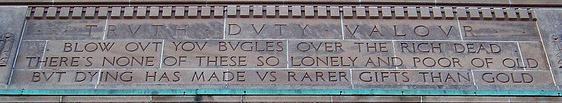
Blow out your bugles, detail on Memorial Arch (by John M. Lyle) at Royal Military College of Canada

Since the 1970s, there has been a restaurant in Grantchester named in Brooke's honour, The Rupert Brooke. In August 2024, it was taken over by Pasquale Benedetto.

== Legacy ==
=== Literary influences ===
In the afterword of his Collected Poems (1919), Lord Alfred Douglas wrote: "... never before in the history of English literature has poetry sunk so low. When a nation ... can seriously lash itself into enthusiasm over the puerile crudities (when they are nothing worse) of a Rupert Brooke, it simply means that poetry is despised and dishonoured and that sane criticism is dead or moribund."

American adventurer Richard Halliburton made preparations for writing a biography of Brooke but died before he could. Halliburton's notes were used by Arthur Springer to write Red Wine of Youth: A Biography of Rupert Brooke (1921). Brooke was an inspiration to Canadian fighter pilot John Gillespie Magee Jr., known for his poems "Sonnet to Rupert Brooke" (1938) and "High Flight" (1941). Brooke also appears as a minor character in A. S. Byatt's novel The Children's Book (2009).

=== Musical influences ===
Frederick Septimus Kelly wrote his "Elegy, In Memoriam Rupert Brooke for harp and strings" after attending Brooke's death and funeral. He also took Brooke's notebooks, containing important late poems, for safekeeping and later returned them to England. Brooke's poems have been set to music by groups and individuals including Charles Ives, Marjo Tal and Fleetwood Mac.

=== Quotes ===
Brooke's poems are quoted in F. Scott Fitzgerald's debut novel This Side of Paradise (1920), Princess Elizabeth's Act of Dedication speech (1947), TV series including M*A*S*H episode "Springtime" (1974) and the third episode of season one of SAS: Rogue Heroes (2022), as well as in films including Making Love (1982).

== See also ==
- List of Bloomsbury Group people
- 27 Club
