= Oliver Dimsdale =

British actor (born 1972)

- Born: 28 October 1972 (age 53); Aylesbury, Buckinghamshire, England
- Education: Guildhall School of Music and Drama
- Years active: 2001–present
- Spouse: Zoë Tapper (2008–present)
- Children: 2

Oliver Dimsdale (born 28 October 1972) is an English actor, known for portraying Louis Trevelyan in the BBC TV serial He Knew He Was Right and Daniel Marlowe in Grantchester.

== Early life and education ==
Born in Aylesbury, Buckinghamshire, he was brought up in Hertfordshire. Dimsdale is the son of a Swiss mother. He has a sister, Anna. He developed a stammer at the age of six, which he has since partially brought under control through speech therapy. Dimsdale attended the Dragon School and then Eton College, and went on to study French and Economics at university. He trained at Guildhall School of Music and Drama, graduating in 1999.

== Career ==
Dimsdale began his performing career at the age of thirteen in a radio play for the BBC. He has lent his voice to the radio productions In The Company of Men and Sharp Focus. His film credits include RocknRolla (2008), Cosi (2010) and the short film Pest.

On television, he played the lead roles of Louis Trevelyan in the 2004 adaptation of He Knew He Was Right, and Dr Felix Quinn in the 2008 ITV1 medical drama Harley Street. He has also made guest appearances in Doctors, Casualty and Lark Rise to Candleford. Since 2016, he has played Daniel Marlowe in Grantchester.

Dimsdale is the co-founder and co-Artistic Director of Filter Theatre. His theatre work includes Great Expectations, The Changeling, Five Finger Exercise and The Tempest.

== Personal life ==
Dimsdale married actress Zoë Tapper on 30 December 2008. In April 2011, she gave birth to their daughter. They have since had another daughter.

== Awards ==
Dimsdale won Best Fringe Performer in the 2002 Manchester Evening News Theatre Awards, for the Royal Exchange performance of Paul Herzberg's The Dead Wait.

== Filmography ==
=== Television ===
Year	Title	Role	Notes
2001	Doctors	James Byford	1 episode: Thin Ice
2003	The Inspector Lynley Mysteries	Mark Penellin	1 episode: "A Suitable Vengeance"
2003	Byron	Percy Bysshe Shelley	TV film
2004	He Knew He Was Right	Louis Trevelyan	
2005	Dalziel and Pascoe	Danny Latimer	2 episodes: "Dead Meat", (Parts One and Two)
2005	Casualty	Michael Mallins	1 episode: "And On That Farm"
2006	Nostradamus	Michael Nostradamus	TV film
2007	Fallen Angel	Michael Appleton	
2008	Harley Street	Dr Felix Quinn	
2009	Lark Rise to Candleford	George Ellison	1 episode: Episode 2.4
2009	Breaking the Mould	Ernst Chain	TV film
2013	Ambassadors	French Ambassador	TV series
2013	Downton Abbey (Christmas episode)	The Prince of Wales	TV series
2016	Father Brown	Ned Le Broc	Episode 4.7 "The Missing Man"
2016	Mr Selfridge	Mr. Keen	Episodes 4.5, 4.6, 4.7, 4.9, 4.10
2016–present	Grantchester	Daniel Marlowe	Recurring
2019	The Last Czars	Pierre Gilliard	6 Episodes - Netflix docu-drama

=== Film ===
Year	Title	Role	Notes
2003	Pest	Jonathan Kitcher	Short film
2008	RocknRolla	Posh Man in Shorts	
2010	Cosi	Phillip	
2011	What You Will	Sir Toby Belch	Mockumentary
2014	Good People	Supt Ray Martin	

=== Video games ===
Year	Title	Role	Notes
2015	Everybody's Gone to the Rapture	Stephen Appleton	Voice role

== Theatre ==
- Water, Lyric Hammersmith, October - November 2007
- Pravda, Chichester Festival Theatre, September 2006 (playing Andrew May)
- The Caucasian Chalk Circle, Cottesloe Theatre, March - April 2006, (playing Fat Prince)
- Twelfth Night, Tricycle Theatre, September 2008 (playing Toby Belch)
