= Adam James (actor) =

English actor (born 1972)

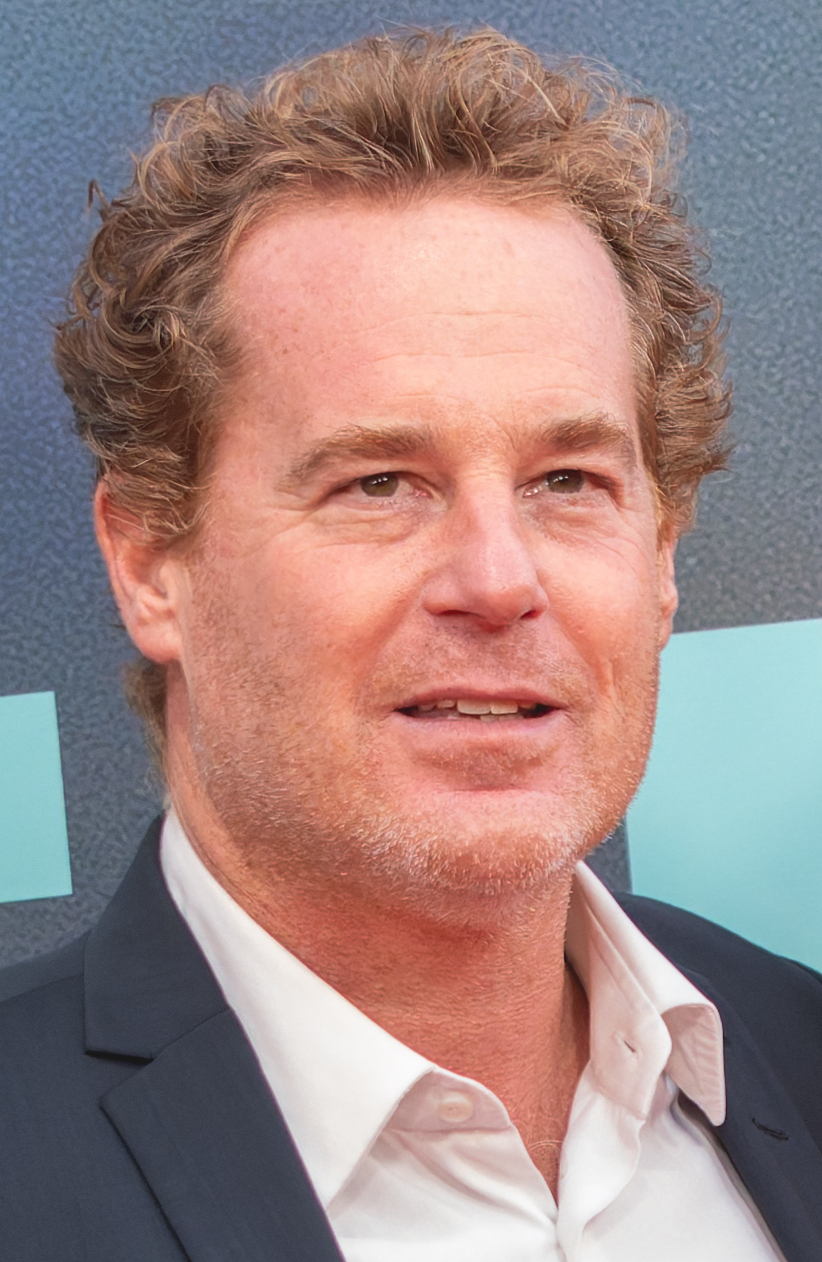
- James in 2024
- Born: 9 September 1972 (age 54); London, England
- Education: Guildhall School of Music and Drama
- Occupation: Actor
- Years active: 1990–present
- Spouse: Victoria Shalet (m. 2015)
- Children: 2

Adam James (born 9 September 1972) is an English actor.

== Early life ==
James was born in London on 9 September 1972.

James's godfather was Jon Pertwee. He trained at the Guildhall School of Music and Drama where he was a contemporary of Dominic West and Daniel Evans, graduating in 1996.

== Career ==
His credits include Band of Brothers, The Mother of Tears, Ancient Rome: The Rise and Fall of an Empire, Bonekickers, Henry VIII: The Mind of a Tyrant and a long running storyline in Casualty, as well as an episode of ITV2 drama Secret Diary of a Call Girl. He appeared in Extras, as the new agent of Ricky Gervais's character, as well as appearing in Ashes to Ashes as Edward Markham in the first episode. James also had a role as Rupert in an episode of Miranda.

In 2009, James appeared in the Doctor Who episode "Planet of the Dead" with David Tennant, the pair having first worked together in Manchester's Royal Exchange Theatre 1999 production of King Lear. James's other theatre work includes Blood and Gifts (2010) and Much Ado About Nothing (2011), alongside David Tennant and Catherine Tate. He has recently appeared in a few rehearsed readings at the Royal Court and Finborough Theatre.

He portrayed Monsieur de Barra in the feature film A Little Chaos, and Jeremy Heywood in Coalition, a Channel 4 drama about the 2010 election. In November 2015, he reprised his role as Prime Minister Mr Evans in King Charles III on Broadway, New York. In 2016, he portrayed Hovstad in An Enemy of the People at Chichester Festival Theatre.

In 2024, James played Galinda's father in the two-part film adaptation of the musical Wicked. He also had a role as Jeremy Whitelock in the Peacock series The Day of the Jackal. In 2025, he made his debut with the Royal Shakespeare Company at the Royal Shakespeare Theatre in Stratford-upon-Avon, where he played Duke Vincentio in William Shakespeare's Measure for Measure.

== Personal life ==
In September 2015, he married former actress and psychotherapist Victoria Shalet. Their first child was born in September 2016. James also has a daughter from a previous relationship.

== Filmography ==
=== Film ===
Year	Title	Role	Notes
1997	Forbidden Territory	Albert Barney	
1999	Gregory's Two Girls	Phil	
2000	High Heels and Low Lifes	Rupert	
2003	Three Blind Mice	1st Exec	Uncredited
2003	Prima Dammi Un Bacio	Stephen	
2004	De-Lovely	Horsegroom	
2006	The Road to Guantánamo	Chris Mackay	Docu-drama
2007	Mother of Tears	Michael Pierce	Nominated as Best Actor at the David di Donatello Awards
2008	Broken Lines	Toby	
2008	Last Chance Harvey	Josh Hillman	
2011	Much Ado About Nothing	Don Pedro, Prince of Aragon	
2012	Tad, the Lost Explorer	Max Mordon	Voiceover, animated film
2013	Kilimanjaro	Thomas Samuelson	Shown at the SXSW, Dallas and Newport Film Festivals
2014	A Little Chaos	Monsieur de Barra	
2015	Capture the Flag	Scott Goldwing	English version, voice
2018	Johnny English Strikes Again	Pegasus	
2018	Hunter Killer	Captain Forbes	
2018	Sgt. Stubby: An American Hero	Additional voices	Animated film
2019	The Kill Team	Hardin	
2023	The Penitent	Richard Marlow	
2024	We Live in Time	Simon Maxson	
2024	Wicked	Glinda's Father	
2025	Wicked: For Good	Glinda's Father	

=== Television ===
Year	Title	Role	Notes
1996	Cold Lazarus	Militia man	
1996	Sharpe's Regiment	Captain Carline	
1996	The Bill	PC Kelleher	Episode: "A Good Night Out"; Episode: "No Assistance Required"
1997	Island	Ross	6 episodes
1998	Silent Witness	Eden Blackman	2 episodes
1998	Life of the Party	Winston Spencer Churchill	Television film
1999	Let Them Eat Cake	Marquis de Bonvie	Episode: "The Pox"
2000	The 10th Kingdom	Beantown Man	2 episodes
2000	I Saw You	Kevin	Television film
2001	Murder on the Orient Express	William McQueen	Television film
2001	Table 12	Chef	Episode: "After Hours"
2001	Band of Brothers	Pvt. Cleveland O. Petty	Episodes: "Currahee", "Day of Days", "Carentan" and "Crossroads"
2001	The Lost Battalion	Capt. Nelson Holderman, Co. K, 307th	Television film
2003	Holby City	Tim Preston	Episode: "Think Again"
2003	Doctors	Bryan Evans	Episode: "Grievous Loss"
2003	Reversals	Dr. Glen Morrow	Television film
2004	England Expects	Daniel Isaacs	Television film
2004	As If	Richard	Episode: "Alex's POV"
2005	Meucci	William Ryder	Italian television film
2005	Casualty	Pete Guildford	17 episodes
2005	Love Soup	Guy Cassidy	Episode: "The Reflecting Pool"
2006	Shiny Shiny Bright New Hole in my Heart	Rupert	Television film
2006	Ancient Rome: The Rise and Fall of an Empire	Titus Flavius	Episode: "Rebellion"
2006	The Amazing Mrs Pritchard	Mark McCaffrey	Episode #1.4
2007	Judge John Deed	Major General Waters	Episodes: "War Crimes" Parts 1 & 2
2007	Waking the Dead	Michael Leonard	Episodes: "Deus Ex Machina" Parts 1 & 2
2007	Desperados	David Barclay	2 episodes
2007	The Commander	Tony Lattice	Television film
2007	Sold	Darius Bowmore	Episode #1.4
2007	Extras	Tre Cooper	Episode: "The Extra Special Series Finale"
2008	Ashes to Ashes	Edward Markham	Episode #1.1
2008	My Family	Daniel	Episode: "The Parent Trap"
2008	Harley Street	Calvin Morgan	Episode #1.1
2008	Bonekickers	John	Episode: "The Lines of War"
2008	Consuming Passion: 100 Years of Mills & Boon	Mick	Television film
2008	Wired	Simon Penvell	2 episodes
2008, 2011	Secret Diary of a Call Girl	Matt Hexton	2 episodes
2009	Hotel Babylon	Carlton Foreman	2 episodes
2009	Henry VIII: The Mind of a Tyrant	Henry VIII	2 episodes
2009	Jonathan Creek	Alec	Episode: "The Grinning Man"
2009	Hustle	Carlton Wood	2 episodes
2009	Doctor Who	D.I. McMillan	Episode: "Planet of the Dead"
2009	The Execution of Gary Glitter	John Carter QC	Television film
2009	Sleep with Me	MacDara	Television film
2010	A Touch of Frost	Gregory Salmond	Episodes: "If the Dogs Run Free" Parts 1 & 2
2010	Foyle's War	Major Wesker	Episode: "Killing Time"
2010	Lewis	Ethan Croft	Episode: "Your Sudden Death Question"
2010	Trinny and Susannah: From Boom to Bust	Dinner Guest	Television film
2010	Miranda	Rupert "the bear"	Episode: "Let's Do It"
2011	Law & Order: Los Angeles	Max Steinberg	Episode: "Benedict Canyon"
2012	Vexed	Charlie Brewer	Episode #2.3
2013	Silent Witness	Dr Richard Fell	2 episodes
2013	Holby City	Alan McLaren	Episode: "Promises, Promises"
2013	Law & Order: UK	Michael Gennis	Episode: "Tracks"
2013	Churchill's First World War (a.k.a. Churchill: The War Letters)	Winston Churchill	Television film
2013	Family Tree	Ronnie Chadwick	Episode: "Country Life"
2014	The Crimson Field (formerly The Ark)	Colonel Charles Purbright	2 episodes
2014	The Game	George	Episode: "Episode 3"
2014	The Assets	Walt Escott	Episode: "A Small Useless Truth"
2014	Grantchester	James Heath	Episode #1.6
2014	Gunpowder 5/11: The Greatest Terror Plot	State Inquisitor	Television film
2015	Coalition	Jeremy Heywood	Television film
2015	Drifters	Julian	Episode: "Roomies"
2015	Catherine Tate's Nan	Charles Wilmott	Episode: "Knees Up Wilmott-Brown"
2015, 2017	Doctor Foster	Neil Baker	7 episodes
2016, 2018	Home from Home	Robert Dillon	7 episodes
2017	Endeavour	Kent Finn	Episode: "Game"
2017	King Charles III	Prime Minister Tristan Evans	Television film
2017	1066: A Year to Conquer England	Harold Godwinson	Miniseries; 3 episodes
2017	Eric, Ernie and Me	Ernest Maxim	Television film
2019	Deep State	Adam McKay	6 episodes
2020	I May Destroy You	Julian	4 episodes
2020	Belgravia	John Belassis	5 episodes
2020	Life	Neil Baker	Miniseries; 3 episodes
2021	Vigil	Lieutenant Commander Mark Prentice	6 episodes
2022	Treason	Patrick Hamilton	Miniseries, 5 episodes
2022	The Suspect	Gerald Owen	5 episodes
2022–2024	Hotel Portofino	Jack Turner	7 episodes
2023	You	Elliot Tannenberg	2 episodes
2023	The Long Shadow	Desmond Wilcox	Episode #1.7
2023	The Buccaneers	Colonel St. George	4 episodes
2024	Mr Bates vs The Post Office	Patrick Green QC	Episode #1.4
2024	Belgravia: The Next Chapter	John Bellasis	Episode #1.8
2024	The Day of the Jackal	Jeremy Whitelock	4 episodes
2025	Death in Paradise	Rick Mayhew	Episode #14.2
2025	Murder Before Evensong	Bernard De Floures	Main
2026	Young Sherlock	Dr. Charles Maltby	In production

=== Theatre ===
Year	Title	Role	Notes
1990	Coriolanus	Meninius	
1995	A View from the Bridge	Rudolpho	
1995	Tamburlaine		
1996	Lone Star	Cletis	
1996	Private Wars	Gately	
1996	Unseen Hand	Cisco	
1997	Poor Super Man	Matt	nominated as Best Newcomer at the MEN Awards
1998	Chimes at Midnight	Hotspur	
1998	The Glass Menagerie	Gentleman Caller	
1999	King Lear	Edmund	
2000	Snake in the Fridge	Randy	
2002	Original Sin	Eugene Black	
2002	Time and the Conways	Robin Conway	
2004	The Importance of Being Earnest	Algernon Moncrieff	
2006	Rabbit	Richard	playing the same role in the Brits off-Broadway season at the 59E59 Theaters in New York City, June/July 2007
2007	French Without Tears	Lt. Commander Bill Rogers	
2007	My Child	Karl	Played the only named character.
2008	Now or Later	Marc	
2009/9	Gethsemane	Geoff Benzine	
2010	Blood and Gifts	Simon Craig	nominated for Best Supporting Actor in the Whatsonstage Awards
2010	The Pride	Peter/Man/Doctor	Drama Desk nomination; won the 2010 Lucille Lortel Award for Outstanding Featured Actor
2011	Tiger Country	John	
2011	Much Ado About Nothing	Don Pedro	
2011	13	Mark	
2012	Don't Dress for Dinner	Bernard	Sequel to Boeing Boeing.
2013	Bull	Tony	Rehearsed reading in 2010. Crucible Theatre, February 2013, then off-Broadway transfer.
2013	Chan	Various roles	Royal Court reading of Chilean play which took place on 13 September 2013
2013	Death at Whitbridge	Fred Wallis	One off performance at Finborough Theatre, Sunday 6 October
2014	Rapture, Blister, Burn	Don Harper	A Hampstead Theatre Production, which ran from 16 January – 22 February 2014
2014	King Charles III	Prime Minister	Almeida Theatre, transferred to the Wyndhams Theatre and then to Broadway.
2015	Bull	Tony	Young Vic Theatre.
2016	An Enemy of the People	Hovstad	Chichester Festival Theatre
2017	Consent	Jake	Royal National Theatre
2019	Shipwreck	James	The Almeida Theatre

=== Radio ===
Year	Title	Role	Notes
????	The Nature of Vikings		
2004	Selling Immortality		
2010	Deep Cut	Colonel Nigel Josling	(Radio 4) Re-broadcast in November 2011.
2011	Our Country's Good	Robert Sideway	Our Country's Good and The Recruiting Officer shared the same cast when they were broadcast on Radio 3 & 4 in December 2011
2011	The Recruiting Officer	Mr. Worthy	
2012	Twelfth Night	Sir Andrew	
2012	Romeo and Juliet	Benvolio	

=== Other ===
Year	Title	Role	Notes
2008	9/11: The Bronx	Series narrator	
2009	Doctor Who Confidential (Planet of the Dead)	Himself	
2009	Theatre Live		
