= He Knew He Was Right (TV serial) =

- Genre: Costume drama
- Written by: Andrew Davies
- Directed by: Tom Vaughan
- Starring: Geoffrey Palmer; Bill Nighy
- Composer: Debbie Wiseman
- Country of origin: United Kingdom
- Original language: English
- No. of episodes: 4

Production
- Executive producers: Bill Boyes; Rebecca Eaton; Sally Haynes; Laura Mackie
- Producer: Nigel Stafford-Clark
- Cinematography: Mike Eley
- Editor: Chris Risdale
- Production company: BBC / WGBH

Original release
- Network: BBC One
- Release: 18 April – 25 April 2004

He Knew He Was Right is a 2004 British romance miniseries of the Anthony Trollope novel of the same name. Directed by Tom Vaughan from a screenplay by Andrew Davies and produced by Nigel Stafford-Clark, the four-part adaptation stars Oliver Dimsdale, Laura Fraser, David Tennant, and Bill Nighy.

== Plot summary ==
The series portrays the failure of a marriage caused by the unreasonable jealousy of a husband exacerbated by the stubbornness of a wilful wife.

== Cast ==
- Oliver Dimsdale — Louis Trevelyan
- Laura Fraser — Emily Trevelyan
- Anna Massey — Miss Stanbury
- Bill Nighy — Colonel Osborne
- Geoffrey Palmer — Sir Marmaduke Rowley
- Christina Cole — Nora Rowley
- Geraldine James — Lady Rowley
- Jane Lapotaire — Lady Milborough
- Raymond Coulthard — Mr. Glascock
- Maggie Ollerenshaw — Martha
- Stephen Campbell Moore — Hugh Stanbury
- Caroline Martin — Dorothy Stanbury
- Amy Marston — Priscilla Stanbury
- Joanna David — Mrs. Stanbury
- Barbara Flynn — Mrs. French
- Anna-Louise Plowman — Caroline Spalding
- David Tennant — Mr Gibson
- John Alderton — Mr Outhouse
- Fenella Woolgar — Arabella French
- Claudie Blakley — Camilla French
- Matthew Goode — Brooke Burgess
- Ron Cook- Mr. Bozzle
- Patsy Palmer - Mrs. Bozzle
- Sinead Matthews — Mary
