= Life (2020 TV series) =

2020 TV series

- Genre: Drama
- Written by: Mike Bartlett
- Directed by: Ben Gosling-Fuller; Kate Hewitt
- Starring: Alison Steadman; Peter Davison; Adrian Lester; Rachael Stirling; Saira Choudhry; Victoria Hamilton; Susannah Fielding; Erin Kellyman; Melissa Johns; Calvin Demba; Joshua James; Geoffrey Streatfeild; Kate Ashfield; Buffy Davis; Karl Theobald; David Troughton; Kika Markham
- Opening theme: "My Angel" by Guy Garvey
- Original language: English
- No. of series: 1
- No. of episodes: 6

Production
- Executive producers: Mike Bartlett; Roanna Benn
- Producer: Kate Crowther
- Production location: Manchester
- Running time: 60 minutes
- Production company: Drama Republic

Original release
- Network: BBC One
- Release: 29 September – 3 November 2020

Related
- Doctor Foster

Life is a British six-part drama television series by the BBC, written by Mike Bartlett. It was first broadcast on 29 September 2020. The series follows the residents of four flats who live in a converted Victorian house, with an ensemble cast led by Alison Steadman and Peter Davison. Melissa Johns and Adrian Lester also star, with Victoria Hamilton reprising her role as Anna Baker – now known as Belle Stone – from Bartlett's series Doctor Foster. Her ex-husband Neil Baker (Adam James) reprises his role for three of the six episodes.

== Cast and characters ==
- Alison Steadman as Gail Reynolds (née Matthews), Henry's 70-year-old wife who becomes discontented with her marriage
- Peter Davison as Henry Reynolds, Gail's husband
- Adrian Lester as David Aston, a recently widowed English Literature tutor
- Rachael Stirling as Kelly Aston, David's recently deceased wife who appears to him as a ghost
- Saira Choudhry as Saira Malik, one of David's students
- Victoria Hamilton as Belle Stone, a divorced woman previously known as Anna Baker (see Doctor Foster)
- Erin Kellyman as Maya Stone, Ruth's daughter who moves in with Belle
- Melissa Johns as Hannah Taylor, a pregnant woman who is in a relationship with Liam
- Calvin Demba as Andy, the father of Hannah's child
- Joshua James as Liam Banner, Hannah's fiancé
- Susannah Fielding as Ruth Stone, Belle's sister who is sectioned
- Adam James as Neil Baker, Belle's ex-husband (see Doctor Foster)
- Elaine Paige as Helen, an old friend of Henry and Gail

== Episodes ==
No.	Title	Directed by	Written by	Original release date	BBC One Broadcast	UK viewers (millions)
1	"Episode 1"	Ben Gosling-Fuller	Mike Bartlett	29 September 2020	29 September 2020	5.59
The residents of a house in Manchester split into four flats live separate but equally troubled lives. As Gail Reynolds prepares to celebrate her 70th birthday, an encounter with an old friend leaves her questioning the durability of her marriage to Henry, a retired doctor who is patronising towards his wife and has terminal cancer. Hannah Taylor is reunited with Andy, the father of her unborn child, who turns up to see the baby being born, threatening her relationship with her fiancé Liam. University lecturer David Aston, whose dead wife, Kelly, appears to him in hallucinations, is disturbed by an interaction with Saira, an attractive stranger who later turns up in his English class. Divorcee Belle Stone's fresh start is complicated when her niece Maya comes to stay after her mother, Belle's sister, attempts suicide.
2	"Episode 2"	Ben Gosling-Fuller	Mike Bartlett	6 October 2020	6 October 2020	4.38
Gail is upset with Henry after he confesses to a past affair with their friend Helen, especially when she learns that their children already knew about it. Saira, working as a waitress, offers sympathy. David realises that his wife Kelly may have been living a double life. Belle has another job interview and receives final demand bills in the post. She renounces alcohol after a disastrous date, and her sister Ruth, now in a mental hospital, urges her to stay strong in order to care for Maya. Liam discourages Andy from spending time with Hannah and the baby. Andy's new girlfriend approaches Hannah.
3	"Episode 3"	Ben Gosling-Fuller	Mike Bartlett	13 October 2020	13 October 2020	5.44
David searches for the truth about Kelly, and learns that she was having an affair. An encounter with her ex-husband Neil while on an evening out prompts Belle to relapse, but she goes to a lesbian club to search for Maya when she gets an upset call from the girl. It's Maya's 16th birthday and Maya thought her girlfriend was interested in someone else. Belle finds Maya and gets the girls to reconcile. Gail and Henry's marriage reaches breaking point as he refuses to listen to her, tells her she is ridiculous, and so she leaves. Hannah asks for space from Liam but sees Andy in his absence, with ambivalent feelings. David has a contact confirm that Kelly had admitted to being unfaithful but he did not know who she had been seeing. David then sleeps with Saira. Before Belle leaves the club she sees a photo board and a picture of Kelly kissing Saira.
4	"Episode 4"	Kate Hewitt	Mike Bartlett	20 October 2020	20 October 2020	5.31
David and Saira start to sell off some of Kelly's old things. Belle's drinking spirals out of control when she discovers Neil is getting remarried and his fiancée is pregnant. The woman is wealthy and wants to give Belle money as Neil ripped her off in their divorce. Belle is outraged. The ensuing binge leads her to confront Saira about the secrets she's keeping from David. Liam invites Andy and his girlfriend to join him and Hannah for dinner, but he soon discovers that Hannah and Andy have been spending time together in secret. Henry struggles to adapt to life without Gail and tells his friends she is poorly. After hearing advice from his old friend Robert, he seeks Gail out, but when he sees her with another man, he seeks to revive his relationship with Helen.
5	"Episode 5"	Kate Hewitt	Mike Bartlett	27 October 2020	27 October 2020	5.41
Gail unexpectedly returns home with a new zest for life, but Henry objects to his wife's apparent change of character. David pushes Belle for answers about her confrontation with Saira, but she refuses to tell him the full story. Maya reacts badly when Ruth comes out of hospital and moves into the flat. On the eve of her wedding to Liam, Hannah is upset by the revelation that Andy is planning to move to New York to work.
6	"Episode 6"	Kate Hewitt	Mike Bartlett	4 November 2020	3 November 2020	5.56
Hannah is filled with last-minute doubts on her wedding day. Belle attends an alcoholics anonymous meeting, where she bumps into Dominic, with whom she has an on-off relationship. At Neil's wedding, she realises she has to give up on him, and instead goes to the church for Hannah's wedding. Andy regrets attending the wedding and leaves before the service starts. Maya is anxious about her appearance as a bridesmaid, but is reassured by both Ruth and Belle. Henry frees Gail from their marriage, and she, Belle and Maya help Hannah when she decides to call off the wedding. David plots revenge against an unwitting Saira, but is dissuaded when she shows him a video in which Kelly expresses love for them both. Belle and Maya help Hannah to find Andy, while Henry returns to the church to tell Gail he wants to make a fresh start. All apart from Liam return to the house to celebrate the cancellation of the wedding.
