= Doctor Foster (TV series) =

British television drama series (2015–)

- Genre: Psychological thriller
- Created by: Mike Bartlett
- Developed by: Mike Bartlett
- Written by: Mike Bartlett
- Directed by: Tom Vaughan (series 1); Jeremy Lovering (series 2)
- Starring: Suranne Jones; Bertie Carvel; Jodie Comer; Tom Taylor; Adam James; Victoria Hamilton; Robert Pugh
- Opening theme: "Fly" by Ludovico Einaudi
- Country of origin: United Kingdom
- Original language: English
- No. of series: 2
- No. of episodes: 10

Production
- Executive producers: Mike Bartlett; Roanna Benn; Greg Brenman; Jude Liknaitzky; Matthew Read
- Running time: 60 minutes
- Production company: Drama Republic

Original release
- Network: BBC One; BBC One HD
- Release: 9 September 2015 – present

Related
- Life

Doctor Foster is a British psychological thriller television series inspired by the ancient Greek myth of Medea which debuted on BBC One on 9 September 2015. Created and written by Mike Bartlett, it stars Suranne Jones as Gemma Foster, a doctor who suspects her husband Simon (Bertie Carvel) is having an affair.

The second series started on 5 September 2017 and concluded on 3 October 2017. Both series were critical and ratings successes, and the programme was remade in multiple countries. A spin-off, Life, featuring the character of Anna Baker, aired in 2020. A potential third series remained uncertain for years: Jones initially cited incompatibility of schedules. Bartlett said while there is more to explore with Gemma Foster's story, he would bring the show back only if there were a vital story to be told. On 25 February 2026, it was finally confirmed that the show would be returning for a third and final series.

== Cast ==
=== Series one ===
- Suranne Jones as Dr. Gemma Foster, a 37-year-old general practitioner in the town of "Parminster", who begins to suspect her husband, Simon, is having an affair. She is the series' main protagonist and is analogous to Medea.
- Bertie Carvel as Simon Foster, a 40-year-old property developer, Gemma's husband and the series' main antagonist. The character is analogous to Jason.
- Clare-Hope Ashitey as Carly Williams, a patient of Gemma's, who helps support Gemma, due to her suspicions of Simon.
- Cheryl Campbell as Helen Foster (episodes 1–3)
- Jodie Comer as Kate Parks, a 23-year-old university student who has been secretly having a two-year affair with Simon Foster. The character is analogous to Glauce.
- Navin Chowdhry as Anwar (episodes 2–3, 5)
- Victoria Hamilton as Anna Baker (episodes 1–3, 5)
- Tom Taylor as Tom Foster, Gemma and Simon's 13-year-old son. The character is compositely analogous to Medea's sons: Mermerus, Pheres, and Medus.
- Martha Howe-Douglas as Becky Hughes
- Adam James as Neil Baker (episodes 1–3, 5)
- Thusitha Jayasundera as Ros Mahendra
- Sara Stewart as Susie Parks (episodes 1–2, 4–5), Kate's mother.
- Neil Stuke as Chris Parks (episodes 1–2, 4–5), Kate's father. The character is analogous to King Creon.
- Robert Pugh as Jack Reynolds (episodes 1–2, 4)
- Ricky Nixon as Daniel Spencer (episodes 1, 4)
- Daniel Cerqueira as Gordon Ward, a hypochondriac who regularly visits Gemma at the medical practice
- Megan Roberts as Isobel, a friend of Tom's

=== Series two ===
- Suranne Jones as Gemma Foster
- Bertie Carvel as Simon Foster
- Tom Taylor as Tom Foster
- Jodie Comer as Kate Parks (episodes 1–4)
- Victoria Hamilton as Anna Baker (episodes 1–4)
- Adam James as Neil Baker (episodes 1–3)
- Prasanna Puwanarajah as James, Gemma's new love interest (episodes 1–3, 5). The character is analogous to King Aegeus.
- Siân Brooke as Siân Lambert, a new Doctor at Gemma's surgery with mysterious links to Simon (episodes 1–2, 4–5)
- Hope Lloyd as Isobel (episodes 1, 3)
- Frank Kauer as Max, Tom's best friend (episodes 1–3)
- Thusitha Jayasundera as Ros Mahendra (episodes 1–3, 5)
- Joanie Kent as Amelie Foster, Simon and Kate's daughter (episodes 1–4)
- Daniel Cerqueira as Gordon Ward (episodes 1–2)
- Helena Lymbery as Mrs Walters, Tom's headteacher (episodes 2–3)
- Martha Howe-Douglas as Becky Hughes (episode 1)
- Sara Stewart as Susie Parks (episodes 1, 4)
- Neil Stuke as Chris Parks (episodes 1, 4)
- Clare-Hope Ashitey as Carly Williams (episode 4)
- Philip Wright as Connor, Ros' fiancé and then husband (episodes 1, 3, 5)

== Episodes ==
Series	Episodes	Originally released		Average viewership (in millions) (Note: The ratings over a 28-day period, including the broadcasts on BBC One and streaming through BBC iPlayer.)
Series	Episodes	First released	Last released	Average viewership (in millions)
1	5	9 September 2015	7 October 2015	9.51
2	5	5 September 2017	3 October 2017	10.20

=== Series 1 (2015) ===
No.	Title	Directed by	Written by	Original release date	Viewers (millions)
1	"Episode 1"	Tom Vaughan	Mike Bartlett	9 September 2015	9.19
Gemma Foster, a doctor at the Parminster Medical Centre, is happily married to property developer Simon, with whom she has a young son, Tom. One day, she finds a blonde hair on Simon's scarf and suspects him of infidelity, possibly with his assistant Becky. Rather than confront him, she confides in her colleague Ros. At work, she forces elderly doctor Jack Reynolds, who has become an alcoholic, to retire. She makes a deal with a young patient, Carly, to give her sleeping pills and get rid of her abusive partner by threatening him and demanding he move out - in return for the patient following Simon.
2	"Episode 2"	Tom Vaughan	Mike Bartlett	16 September 2015	9.19
Gemma has discovered that Simon's mistress is Kate Parks, the daughter of one of her patients and that Ros knew of the affair but was bound by patient confidentiality rules. She also establishes that Kate is now pregnant. At a bar, Gemma meets another patient, Anwar, a married lawyer who is keeping the fact that he might have a brain tumour from his family. Encouraged by Jack Reynolds, whom she has reconciled with and talked out of suicide, Gemma confronts Simon but he denies having an affair. But his ailing mother Helen, whose own husband cheated on her, tells Gemma the affair has been going on for two years, and not three months as he had told Ros. Gemma makes an appointment with Anwar, who specialises in divorce.
3	"Episode 3"	Tom Vaughan	Mike Bartlett	23 September 2015	9.26
On Anwar's advice, Gemma acts towards Simon as if everything is normal, while investigating his love life and financial affairs through other people. She gets Carly to befriend Kate, and sleeps with, then blackmails Simon's accountant Neil. Neil reveals that Simon's big project, the re-development of a school, is a financial black hole and that their joint savings and home would be gone if it were not for a mysterious investor bailing him out. Simon's mother, who had been terminally ill and in pain, ends her life. Gemma decides against divorce because of Simon's distress and vulnerability.
4	"Episode 4"	Bruce Goodison	Mike Bartlett	30 September 2015	9.35
To Ros's surprise, Gemma stays with Simon, believing his affair is over after Kate had an abortion. However, her work life crumbles after negative comments about her get posted on the Internet, and the police suspect her of involvement in her mother-in-law's death. Carly's boyfriend has also filed a complaint about her for threatening him earlier. Gemma has a breakdown after discovering that Simon is seeing Kate again. She attempts suicide by drowning before finding new strength.
5	"Episode 5"	Bruce Goodison	Mike Bartlett	7 October 2015	10.57
Gemma contrives to embarrass Kate and Simon at an awkward dinner party with her family - where she exposes Simon's infidelity and his financial misdeeds. She also reveals that Kate's father, who knew nothing of the affair, is the mysterious investor in Simon's project despite having a conflict of interest by being a council member. She identifies Neil's wife as her mysterious online persecutor. When Simon refuses to leave their house Gemma loses control, picks Tom up from school, and drives off with him. Later, Tom and Carly return to the house. After being given the impression that she has harmed Tom, an enraged Simon slams her against the glass door knocking her unconscious. At a later time, Simon and Kate move to London after Gemma successfully puts a restraining order against him. The episode ends with Gemma helping a victim with cardiac arrest while Tom assists her.

=== Series 2 (2017) ===
No.	Title	Directed by	Written by	Original release date	Viewers (millions)
1	"Episode 1"	Jeremy Lovering	Mike Bartlett	5 September 2017	10.40
Two years after the events of series one, Simon and Kate return to Parminster with their daughter, Amelie, and host a combined housewarming and wedding reception. Despite not being invited, Gemma brings a date, James, to the party and discovers he is Tom's teacher. Snooping around the house, Gemma finds a bedroom prepared for Tom, and has a confrontation with Simon in which he implies that he plans to force her out of town. Gemma gives a wedding gift to Kate and leaves with Tom, who seems to be in a state of distress for reasons related to his friend Isobel. After Simon tells him something which causes him to turn against his mother, Tom leaves Gemma's home to go and live with Simon and his new family. Having been unable to stop Simon from taking Tom, a distraught Gemma dissolves her wedding ring in acid and is seen preparing some medical items in her doctor's bag.
2	"Episode 2"	Jeremy Lovering	Mike Bartlett	12 September 2017	10.27
After Tom's move into Simon's house, Gemma spies on him to find out why he has made a doctor's appointment with new colleague Siân. After several prickly office interactions and an awkward dinner, Gemma learns some details. At Gemma's instigation, Neil meets Simon in an attempt to discover information on his newfound wealth but is lured into a one-night stand by one of Simon's colleagues. Neil tells Gemma that Simon hates her and wants to destroy her. Gemma visits Tom's best friend, Max, to learn her son's secrets. Later, she goes to Simon's new house and sees Kate kissing a mysterious man. She goes to a pub and begins to drink very heavily and after a surprise run-in with Simon outside the pub he takes a photo of her on his phone to use as leverage with Tom. Meanwhile, Gemma discovers that Simon has a connection to Siân from their university days, and he had suggested that she take the position in Gemma's surgery. After confronting Simon at his workplace, Gemma and Simon are told that Tom is to be expelled from school for attacking Max.
3	"Episode 3"	Jeremy Lovering	Mike Bartlett	19 September 2017	9.80
Simon escalates his plan to push Gemma out of town. After retrieving Tom from the principal's office, he reveals that the reason for the fight with Max was because of the bullying Simon had done to Isobel's mum, Becky when she worked for Simon. Later, Simon arrives at the house, but lies to Kate about his whereabouts. The former couple have dinner together under the pretext of dealing with Tom's school problems which leads to Simon and Gemma having sex. The next day, Simon forwards a video clip of Tom arguing at a cafe and flipping a table. Gemma looks through Tom's phone and finds photos of a budding romance between Isobel and Tom. Gemma spots Isobel in the cafe, who reveals that Tom sexually assaulted her at the party which is the true cause of the fight between Tom and Max. Tom finds refuge at Anna's. Gemma doesn't understand how Tom could assault a woman and she later learns that Simon knew about the sexual assault. Tom confides his shame and self-loathing to Gemma. They agree that leaving Parminster is the best solution for both.
4	"Episode 4"	Jeremy Lovering	Mike Bartlett	26 September 2017	10.06
Kate finds an envelope on her doorstep, containing a note from Gemma and the tie Simon left at her house. Kate confronts him but he denies anything happened. Kate finally opens the wedding gift from Gemma, revealing a note. She drops Amelie at her parents' house, and runs into Carly again. Kate accuses Carly of dropping off the note; Carly simply asks if Simon could have slept with Gemma again. Her suspicions aroused, Kate searches Simon's phone and finds the picture of the inebriated Gemma. She visits Gemma's vacated house, where Anna tells her that she heard Simon and Gemma having sex the prior week. A flashback to earlier part of the day reveals that Gemma contacted Kate's mum. Arriving at Gemma's hotel, Kate is surprised to find Gemma, her parents and her daughter, who try to convince Kate that Simon did cheat on her. After a sleepless night, Kate secretly meets Gemma at her house, who shows her data points to prove Simon is replicating his marriage to Gemma with Kate and pleads with her not to waste her life on him. The next morning, Simon finds that he can't access the ATM, can't find his business partner, and receives a message from Kate to come home. He finds movers at his house and Kate's parents, with her Godfather helping Kate move. Gemma pulls up to the house which enrages Simon.
5	"Episode 5"	Jeremy Lovering	Mike Bartlett	3 October 2017	10.49
Gemma arrives at the hotel just as Simon arrives, and takes Tom to their empty house. Simon arrives at the house, prompting a driveway conversation. Tom clearly doesn't know who or what to believe, but recognises Simon's manipulation and lies. Gemma reflects on the hours before she learned her world would turn upside down. Gemma and Tom join James, Ros and her new husband for dinner. Simon appears, banging the restaurant window, and pleads for mutual absolution and reconciliation. Tom interrupts to call out Simon's long history of lies and failures. After dinner, James returns to the house with Gemma, proposing a fresh start to their relationship. Tom asks about Gemma's dead parents and is worried about how Simon will persist, unless HE is dead. Gemma reflects on another pre-disaster conversation with Simon. Gemma wakes to hear footsteps and a taxi driving away, and finds Tom missing from bed. When James attempts to calm her down, Gemma dismisses the relationship. Gemma reaches Tom on the phone when Simon hijacks the call, and Gemma intuits they're back at the hotel. She finds them on the side of a busy motorway where Simon appears to be on the verge of committing suicide by walking into traffic. Gemma persuades Simon to come inside with her and Tom and they have breakfast. Tom speaks of an optimistic future, while Simon weeps, consumed with self-hate. Simon prompts the reveal of the wedge he planted with Tom: That Gemma suffered post-natal depression after Tom's birth and abandoned him. Tom thinks that's why Gemma worked so much: to avoid spending time with him. Simon suggests Gemma's work is why he started the affair with Kate. Gemma provides Simon with the drugs she was earlier seen preparing, which will allow him to commit suicide with more privacy. Simon continues to toxically manipulate Tom. Gemma and Tom leave but Gemma returns to the hotel room to persuade Simon not to go through with his suicide for their son's sake. Gemma offers a couple of framed pictures and Simon agrees not to use the drugs. Gemma checks her voicemails, and learns Tom has run away. The series ends with Gemma agonising over pictures of Tom on 'Missing Person' notices.

== Production ==
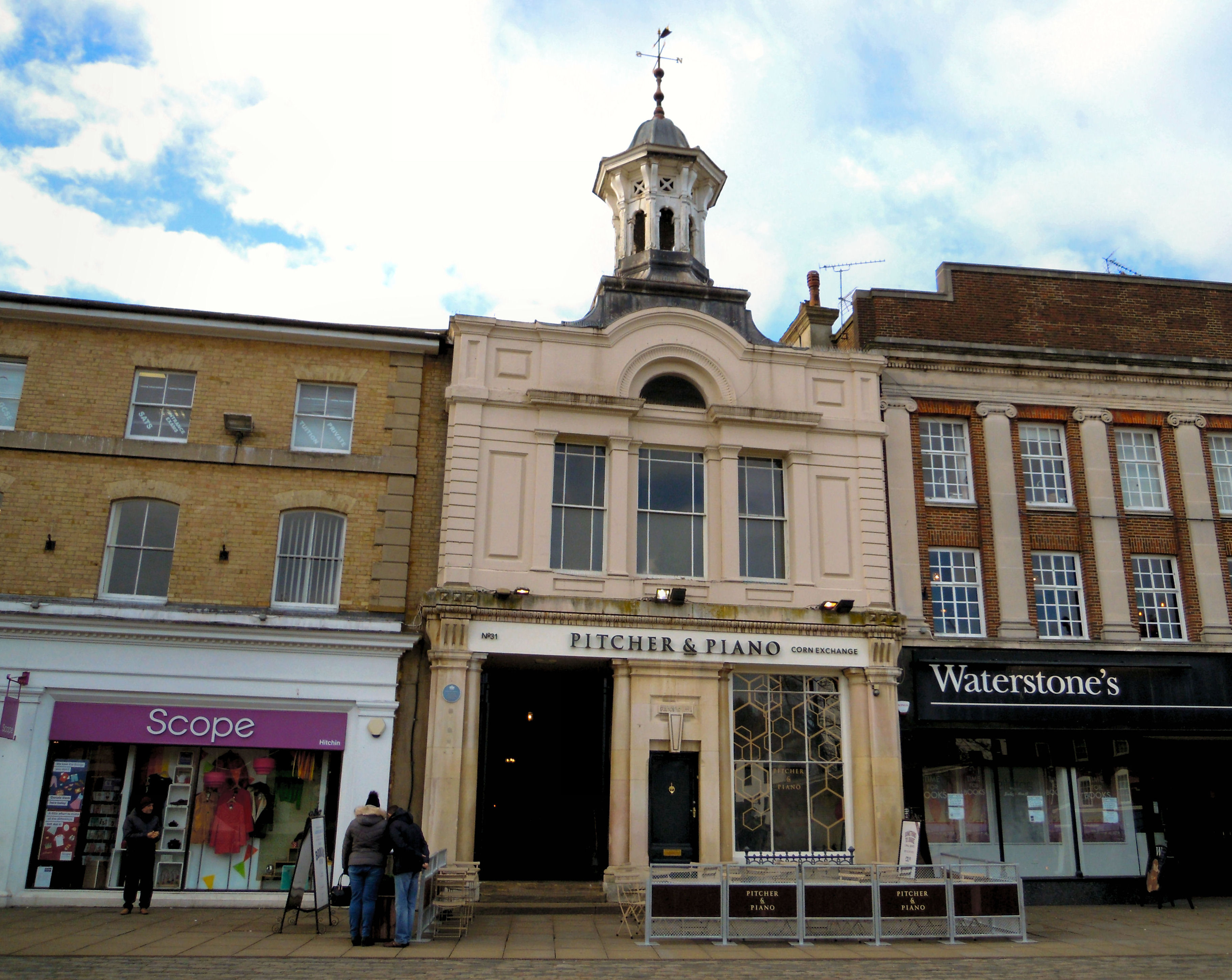
Various scenes were filmed at the Market Square in Hitchin in Hertfordshire

The series was commissioned by Charlotte Moore and Ben Stephenson. The executive producers are Roanna Benn, Greg Brenman, Jude Liknaitzky, and Matthew Read. Filming took place in Green Lane, Croxley Green, Hertfordshire, Copse Wood Way, Northwood, London, Enfield and the Market Square in Hitchin in Hertfordshire. The surgery location shoot was at the Chess Medical Centre, in Chesham in Bucks, renamed Parminster Medical Centre for the show. The railway station featured in the show was Enfield Chase station. The scene that features Tom playing football was filmed at the Southgate Hockey Centre, Enfield.

It was announced at the end of Series 1 that the show would return for a second series, with both Suranne Jones and Bertie Carvel. At the 21st National Television Awards Jones announced that the new series began filming in September 2016.

The second series started on 5 September 2017 and concluded on 3 October 2017.

== Reception ==
In general, the show has received acclaim. The opening episode received generally positive reviews from critics, with Lucy Mangan from The Guardian calling it a "gripping portrait of a marriage slowly being poisoned," although Mangan expressed fears of the show descending into "melodrama in the not too distant future". In a review for The Daily Telegraph, Michael Hogan gave the drama four stars out of five, describing it as "an edgy nail-biter" that was "sparkily written by Olivier Award-winner Mike Bartlett", despite a soundtrack that was "overbearing".

Less enthusiastically, Victoria Segal of The Sunday Times wrote of the fourth episode that it "clattered unsteadily to its denouement ...this episode is as desperately uneven as the rest of the series, thrashing about between high melodrama and muted misery." Catherine Blythe of The Telegraph bemoaned its "absurd plot" and the lack of "emotional logic" in a series of "melodramatic contortions that required a character who was supposed to be brainy to act like an utter fool".

=== Accolades ===
Year	Association	Category	Nominated work	Result
2016	National Television Awards	New Drama	Doctor Foster	Won
2016	National Television Awards	Drama Performance	Suranne Jones	Won
2016	Broadcasting Press Guild Awards	Best Drama	Doctor Foster	Nominated
2016	Broadcasting Press Guild Awards	Best Actress	Suranne Jones	Won
2016	Broadcasting Press Guild Awards	Best Writer	Mike Bartlett	Nominated
2016	Royal Television Society Awards	Best Actress	Suranne Jones	Won
2016	British Academy Television Awards	Best Mini-Series	Doctor Foster	Nominated
2016	British Academy Television Awards	Best Actress	Suranne Jones	Won
2018	National Television Awards	Drama Performance	Suranne Jones	Won
2018	National Television Awards	Drama	Doctor Foster	Won

== Broadcast ==
Internationally, the series premiered in Australia on 17 November 2015 on BBC First, in New Zealand on 17 January 2016 on TV One, in France on 15 June 2016 on C8, in Poland on 3 August 2016 on Ale Kino+, in Sweden on 15 August 2016 on SVT1, and in Finland on 28. February 2018 on Yle TV1. The series aired in the US on Lifetime in April 2016 as Doctor Foster: A Woman Scorned and began streaming on Netflix in October 2016. In Spain, the series' first instalment was first broadcast on Nova in June 2018, and will air again on Antena 3 with two episodes per week as of 5 September and 6 September, respectively. and Brazil for SBT

In South Korea, Doctor Foster aired on KBS 1TV from 25 January 2016 to 9 January 2018. Due to the COVID-19 pandemic, as well as the immense popularity of its local adaptation The World of the Married which aired on JTBC, the latter will re-air Doctor Foster following the end of Married. Graceful Friends, the drama that was supposed to air after the local adaptation, was pushed back to July 2020.

== Adaptations ==
Since 2019, the series has been remade across Europe, Asia and South America.

Currently airing franchise

Country	Local title	Network	Original release
Azerbaijan	Əlvida Xoşbəxtlik Goodbye Happiness	ATV	18 September 2024 – 2 July 2025
Arab World	Al Kha'en الخائن; The Traitor	MBC Group	5 November 2023 – 8 March 2024
Colombia	Engañada; Deceived	RCN Televisión	2025
France	Infidèle; Unfaithful	TF1	7 January – November 2019
Germany	Ein Schritt zum Abgrund; One Step to Abyss	Das Erste	23 March 2023 –
Greece	Παιχνίδια Εκδίκησης; Revenge Games	ANT1 TV	2024–2025
India	Out of Love	JioHotstar	22 November 2019 – 14 May 2021
Indonesia	Mendua; Between Two Hearts (Note: Based on an Indian adaptation, Out of Love.)	Disney+	17 December 2022 – 4 February 2023
Japan	夫婦が壊れるとき; Fufu ga Kowareru Toki	NNN (Nippon TV)	8 April 2023 – 30 June 2023
Philippines	The Broken Marriage Vow	ABS-CBN	24 January – 24 June 2022
Russia	Скажи правду Tell truth	Russia-1	11–14 March 2019
Sweden		TBA	TBA
South Korea	부부의 세계; The World of the Married	JTBC	27 March – 16 May 2020
Slovakia	Zrada; The Betrayal	Markíza	5 February 2024 – 16 April 2024
Thailand	เกมรักทรยศ; The Betrayal	Channel 3	23 August – 12 October 2023
Turkey	Sadakatsiz; Unfaithful	Kanal D	7 October 2020 – 25 May 2022

== Spin-off ==
In 2020, BBC One broadcast the spin-off series Life, similarly written by Mike Bartlett and with Victoria Hamilton reprising her role as the character of Anna Baker, now known as "Belle Stone", living in a converted house in Manchester, England. The series also featured Anna's ex-husband Neil Baker (played again by Adam James).
