= Grantchester (TV series) =

British detective drama

- Series 7 title card
- Genre: Cozy mystery Period drama Detective fiction Whodunnit
- Based on: The Grantchester Mysteries by James Runcie
- Developed by: Daisy Coulam
- Starring: James Norton; Robson Green; Tom Brittney; Rishi Nair; Tessa Peake-Jones; Al Weaver; Nick Brimble; Kacey Ainsworth; Oliver Dimsdale; Bradley Hall; Melissa Johns
- Composer: John Lunn
- Country of origin: United Kingdom
- Original language: English
- No. of series: 11
- No. of episodes: 75 (list of episodes)

Production
- Executive producers: Diederick Santer; Rebecca Eaton
- Producers: Emma Kingsman-Lloyd (1-3); Richard Cookson (4-6); Tim Whitby (7)
- Cinematography: Julian Court
- Running time: 45 minutes
- Production company: Kudos/Masterpiece co-production

Original release
- Network: ITV
- Release: 6 October 2014 – present

Grantchester is a British ITV detective drama set in the 1950s and 60s in the Cambridgeshire village of Grantchester. Its first series was broadcast in 2014. The series originally featured Anglican vicar Sidney Chambers (James Norton); subsequent series have featured vicar William Davenport (Tom Brittney) and vicar Alphy Kottaram (Rishi Nair). Each of them develops a sideline in sleuthing with the help of Detective Inspector Geordie Keating, played by Robson Green.

The series is based on The Grantchester Mysteries, collections of short stories written by James Runcie. The first series was based on the six stories from the first book, Sidney Chambers and the Shadow of Death. A second series aired in March and April 2016, and a third series began its run on 23 April 2017. A fourth series was announced on 12 April 2018, and it was confirmed that this would be the last to feature James Norton in the lead.

Tom Brittney as the Reverend Will Davenport took over the lead from Norton in series four. The fifth series commenced in January 2020. A sixth series was commissioned on 17 July 2020, and began transmission on 3 September 2021. A seventh series was commissioned on 28 July 2021; it started production in summer 2021 with Brittney also directing for the first time. It premiered on 11 March 2022 and concluded on 15 April 2022.

In August 2022, ITV announced that the drama had been commissioned for an eighth series, with Al Weaver directing for the first time, to be broadcast on ITV from 11 January 2024 to 15 February 2024, a year later than planned due to the scheduling conflicts.

A ninth series was announced in July 2023, with Brittney announcing it would be his final series. He was succeeded by Rishi Nair as vicar Alphy Kotteram. A tenth series was announced on 18 June 2024 by Masterpiece on PBS. In June 2025, ITV announced Grantchester had been renewed for an 11th and final series. The eleventh series aired on PBS in June–July 2026.

== Plot ==
In the Cambridgeshire village of Grantchester during the 1950s, Anglican vicar and former Scots Guards officer Sidney Chambers (James Norton), and subsequently his successors Will Davenport (Tom Brittney) and then Alphy Kotteram (Rishi Nair), work with the overworked Detective Inspector Geordie Keating (Robson Green) to forge an unlikely partnership in solving crimes. Keating's gruff, methodical approach to policing complements Chambers' more intuitive techniques of coaxing information from witnesses and suspects. Some sub-plots deal with Leonard Finch's homosexuality before decriminalisation of male homosexual behaviour in England and Wales (1967).

== Cast and characters ==
=== Main ===
- James Norton as the Reverend Sidney Chambers, MC (series 1–4), an Anglican vicar who had been a Scots Guards officer during World War II.
- Robson Green as DI George "Geordie" Keating (series 1–11), a WWII veteran
- Morven Christie as Amanda Hopkins (née Kendall) (series 1–3), an heiress and art restorer at London's National Gallery; she has a romantic relationship with Sidney.
- Tessa Peake-Jones as Sylvia Chapman (formerly Maguire) (series 1–11), the vicarage's devoutly religious housekeeper
- Al Weaver as Leonard Ernest Finch (series 1–11), a curate whose licence is revoked in a later series, when he is discovered to be gay.
- Nick Brimble as Jack Chapman (series 1–11), a retired businessman who later marries Sylvia
- Kacey Ainsworth as Catherine "Cathy" Keating (series 1–11), Geordie's wife
- Oliver Dimsdale as Daniel Marlowe (series 2–11), a photographer who gets secretly involved in a romantic relationship with Leonard
- Tom Brittney as the Reverend William "Will" Davenport (series 4–9), an Anglican vicar who was formerly an inner-city chaplain
- Bradley Hall as DC Larry Peters (series 4–11), Geordie's colleague
- Melissa Johns as Jennifer Scott (series 6–11), a police secretary
- Charlotte Ritchie as Bonnie Davenport (née Evans) (series 7–9), who later becomes involved with Will
- Rishi Nair as the Reverend Alpheus "Alphy" Kotteram (series 9–11)

=== Recurring ===
- Skye Lucia Degruttola as Esme Keating (series 1–11), Geordie's eldest daughter
- Pip Torrens as Sir Edward Kendall (series 1–2), Amanda's father
- Fiona Button as Jennifer Chambers (series 1–2), Sidney's younger sister; Amanda's former classmate
- Ukweli Roach as Johnny Johnson (series 1), Jennifer's boyfriend
- Nakay Kpaka as Walter Sterling (series 1)
- Tom Austen as Guy Hopkins (series 1–3), Amanda's husband, whom she later leaves and then divorces
- Pheline Roggan as Hildegard Staunton (series 1), a young German widow with whom Sidney has a brief romance
- David Troughton as DCI Benson (series 1–2), Geordie's immediate superior
- Joe Claflin as DC Billy Atkins (series 1), Geordie's colleague
- Lorne MacFadyen as DS Phil Wilkinson (series 2–3), Geordie's colleague
- Seline Hizli as Margaret Ward (series 2–3), police secretary, who has a relationship with Sidney and later an affair with Geordie
- Geoff McGivern as the Archdeacon (series 1–2), Sidney's superior
- Gary Beadle as Archdeacon Gabriel Atubo (series 3–6), the church's first Archdeacon of colour
- Neil Morrissey as Harding Redmond (series 2), Abigail's father
- Claudie Blakley as Agatha Redmond (series 2), Abigail's mother
- Emily Bevan as Hilary Franklin (series 3), Leonard's ex-fiancée
- Felix Scott as DI Sean Donovan (series 4), a fellow DI assigned to work alongside Geordie
- Simona Brown as Violet Todd (series 4), the daughter of a civil rights preacher, who later emigrates to the United States with Sidney
- Christian McKay as Anthony Hobbs (series 4), a colleague of Cathy's at Swinnertons
- Sarah Crowden as Mrs Bennett (series 4), a member of the parish council
- Jemma Redgrave as Amelia Davenport (series 4–7), Will's mother
- Dominic Mafham as St. John Gurney-Clifford (series 5–7), Amelia's husband
- Paula Wilcox as Diana (series 5), Cathy's mother and Geordie's mother-in-law, who has bipolar disorder
- Lauren Carse as Ellie Harding (series 5), an ambitious journalist who develops a friendship with Will
- Ross Boatman as Vic Morgan (series 5), a boxing trainer whom Will looks to for guidance
- Stuart Bowman as Bishop Aubrey Gray (series 6–11), the reverends' immediate superior
- Emily Patrick as Tamara Gurney-Clifford (series 6–7), Will's flirtatious socialite stepsister
- Ahmed Elhaj as Curate Henry Jones (series 6), Leonard's replacement when he is sent to prison
- Shaun Dooley as Johnny Richards (series 6), a lawyer and former war comrade of Geordie's
- Michael D. Xavier as DCI Elliot Wallace (series 7–8), Geordie's new boss, whose fiancée has a brief affair with Will
- Ellora Torchia as Maya (series 7), DCI Wallace's fiancée who has a brief affair with Will
- Isaac Highams as Ernie Evans (series 7–9), Bonnie's son from her first marriage
- Elliot Warren as Sam White (series 9), a preacher who befriends Leonard
- Christie Russell-Brown as Meg Gray, Alphy's love interest and Bishop Gray's daughter (series 10–11)

== Cast timeline ==
Character	Cast	Series										
Character	Cast	1	2	3	4	5	6	7	8	9	10	11
Reverend Sidney Chambers	James Norton	Main	Main	Main	Main	—N/a	—N/a	—N/a	—N/a	—N/a	—N/a	—N/a
Reverend William Davenport	Tom Brittney	—N/a	—N/a	—N/a	Main	Main	Main	Main	Main	Main	—N/a	—N/a
Reverend Alphy Kotteram	Rishi Nair	—N/a	—N/a	—N/a	—N/a	—N/a	—N/a	—N/a	—N/a	Main	Main	Main
DI Geordie Keating	Robson Green	Main	Main	Main	Main	Main	Main	Main	Main	Main	Main	Main
Mrs. Sylvia Chapman	Tessa Peake-Jones	Main	Main	Main	Main	Main	Main	Main	Main	Main	Main	Main
Catherine Keating	Kacey Ainsworth	Main	Main	Main	Main	Main	Main	Main	Main	Main	Main	Main
Amanda Hopkins, née Kendall	Morven Christie	Main	Main	Main	—N/a	—N/a	—N/a	—N/a	—N/a	—N/a	—N/a	—N/a
Jack Chapman	Nick Brimble	Main	Main	Main	Main	Main	Main	Main	Main	Main	Main	Main
Leonard Ernest Finch	Al Weaver	Main	Main	Main	Main	Main	Main	Main	Main	Main	Main	Main
Daniel Marlowe	Oliver Dimsdale	—N/a	Main	Main	Main	Main	Main	Main	Main	Main	Main	Main
DC Larry Peters	Bradley Hall	—N/a	—N/a	—N/a	Main	Main	Main	Main	Main	Main	Main	Main
Jennifer Scott	Melissa Johns	—N/a	—N/a	—N/a	—N/a	—N/a	Main	Main	Main	Main	Main	Main
Bonnie Davenport	Charlotte Ritchie	—N/a	—N/a	—N/a	—N/a	—N/a	—N/a	Main	Main	Main	—N/a	—N/a

== Production ==
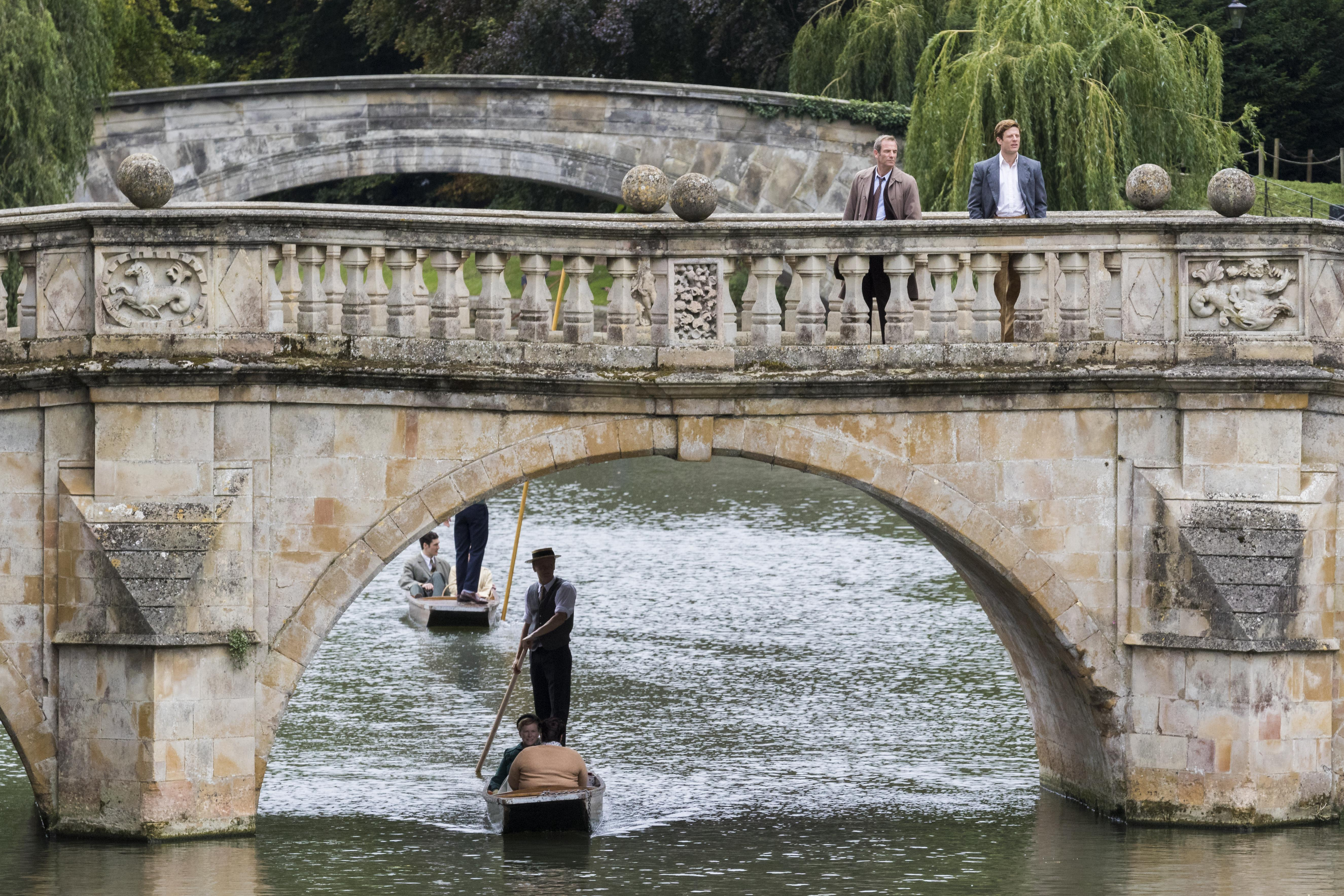
Robson Green and James Norton, filming Grantchester on Clare College Bridge, Cambridge in September 2015

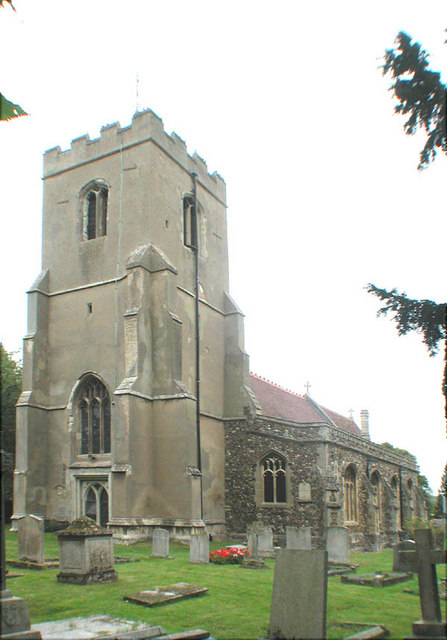
St Andrew and St Mary Church in the village of Grantchester, which features in the TV series

Filming for the first series began in London, Cambridge and Grantchester from March to June 2014. The second series was filmed in autumn 2015, and guest stars included Neil Morrissey, Claudie Blakley, Nigel Planer, Andrew Knott, Nicky Henson and Oliver Dimsdale. The third series was filmed between August and November 2016, and filming for the fourth series commenced in June 2018. The fifth series was filmed in Cambridge and elsewhere during the summer of June 2019.

Grantchester itself is used for filming, with the Church of St Andrew and St Mary used for the church interior and churchyard scenes. Although the vicarage in Grantchester is used for exterior shots, a private home in Lemsford, Hertfordshire, doubles as the interior. The Windmill pub in Chipperfield is used for The Red Lion. King's Parade in Cambridge has been transformed to represent various 1950s street scenes, complete with period cars and buses. Horsted Keynes railway station, on the Bluebell Railway, in West Sussex has been used to double for Cambridge station.

Chatham Dockyard in Kent has doubled for various London locations, including the exterior of Kings Cross Station, Borough Market, and the exterior and interior of a warehouse and ropery. Commissioner's House was also used for filming.

After the third series, James Norton wanted to leave the series to pursue other acting opportunities. Also, actress Morven Christie had departed the show since her storyline involving Sidney Chambers and Amanda had concluded. Without Norton's participation, there was talk of ending the series, but Grantchester had proven to be so popular with television viewers that the producers felt that the show could continue with a new male lead.

At the start of the fourth series, actor Tom Brittney joined the cast as Will Davenport, a former inner-city chaplain who was appointed as Sidney Chambers' replacement as the Anglican vicar of Grantchester. James Norton made his last appearances as Sidney in the first two installments of the fourth season to help with the transition. At the end of the second episode, Sidney Chambers leaves Grantchester and moves to America. Starting with the third episode, actor Robson Green began receiving top billing in the opening credits.

The addition of Brittney to the series gave the opportunity for the remaining cast members to expand their roles, particularly Kasey Ainsworth as Cathy Keating, Geordie's wife, and Oliver Dimsdale as Daniel Marlowe, a local photographer who is also Leonard Finch's best friend and lover. Both Ainsworth's and Dimsdale's characters had been on the back burner for the previous three years. By the time the fourth season began, Cathy was already working as a saleswoman in a department store, and Daniel's relationship with Leonard had become more intimate. The scenes around the Manor house owned by Will Davenport's parents were filmed in Rotherfield Park in East Hampshire.

The first episode of the fifth series continues to feature Will Davenport as vicar of Grantchester. The plot centres around the students of two colleges at the University of Cambridge: a 'prestigious all-female college' (the real-life women's college Newnham College, Cambridge) and a fictional men's college (filmed at St John's College, Cambridge). The sixth series expanded to eight episodes, rather than the standard six.

On 28 July 2021, ITV announced that filming for the seventh series of Grantchester had begun, with the series due for release on 11 March 2022, with Brittney directing for the first time. On 19 August 2022, ITV announced that an eighth series had been commissioned and filming had begun, with its release originally scheduled for late summer/early autumn 2023 but now delayed to early 2024.

In 2023, ITV announced that Series 9 would be the last to star Tom Brittney, and that he would be replaced by former Hollyoaks actor Rishi Nair in the role of Alphy Kotteram. The ninth series was broadcast on ITV in January 2025.

On 8 May 2024, ITV announced the series had been renewed for a 10th series, scheduled to air in January 2026. On 9 July 2025, ITV announced the series would end after its 11th series. It aired on PBS in mid-2026.

== Critical reception ==
The first episode was generally well-received by the critics. Michael Pilgrim of The Daily Telegraph wrote: "Delightfully neat and economical of plot, it's Cluedo with cassocks and just enough noir for the modern palate. Victoria sponge with a tablespoon of battery acid." He added that "There could be a worse antidote than Grantchester" in a grim October in the early 21st century. Ellen Jones of The Independent thought the programme "delightful, a new treat for fans of period-set, gently paced detective series like Endeavour, and also for fans of top TV totty James Norton." Nancy deWolf Smith of The Wall Street Journal wrote, "Grantchester is a revelation."

The first series was given a Metacritic score of 70 based on 14 reviews, indicating a generally favourable reception.

== Broadcast ==
The first series was broadcast in the UK on ITV starting 6 October 2014. The show premiered in the United States on 18 January 2015 on Masterpiece Mystery on PBS. It premiered in Australia on 28 February 2015 on ABC, as well as 9Gem. A French version premiered on France 3 from 12 July 2015. Series two was broadcast on PBS in the US from 27 March 2016. The series was licensed to Amazon Prime in a multi-year deal; that network gained the rights to air the episodes of all series after PBS affiliates had done so. On Amazon Prime, the 2016 Christmas Special listed in the Episodes section below is identified as Episode 1 of Series 3, with a total of seven episodes in the series.

== Series overview ==
- These dates note the UK broadcast of the show. Its later series premiered on PBS in the US prior to the UK broadcast.

Series	Episodes	Originally released		Average UK viewership (in millions)
Series	Episodes	First released	Last released	Average UK viewership (in millions)
1	6	6 October 2014	10 November 2014	6.63
2	6	2 March 2016	6 April 2016	6.44
Special	1	24 December 2016		6.11
3	6	23 April 2017	28 May 2017	6.23
4	6	11 January 2019	15 February 2019	5.43
5	6	10 January 2020	14 February 2020	5.50
6	8	3 September 2021	22 October 2021	4.65
7	6	11 March 2022	15 April 2022	4.17
8	6	11 January 2024	15 February 2024	3.15
9	8	8 January 2025	26 February 2025	3.28
10	8	7 January 2026	19 February 2026	TBA
11	8	TBA	TBA	TBA

Official episode viewing figures are from BARB.

== Episodes ==
=== Series 1 (2014) ===
No. overall	No. in series	Title	Directed by	Written by	Original release date	UK viewers (millions)
1	1	"Episode 1"	Harry Bradbeer	Daisy Coulam	6 October 2014	7.69
When a man's death is ruled a suicide, his mistress appeals to the Reverend Sidney Chambers, insisting her lover was murdered. Chambers uses his position to make inquiries, bringing him the disapproving attention of an overworked local police detective, Inspector Geordie Keating. Sidney's old friend/ love interest, Amanda, reveals that she is engaged to Guy. She sends a black lab puppy to the vicarage to stop Sidney from being lonely. Guest starring Rachel Shelley as Pamela Morton and Michelle Duncan as Annabel Morrison.
2	2	"Episode 2"	Harry Bradbeer	Daisy Coulam	13 October 2014	6.51
Jennifer bullies Sidney into attending Amanda's engagement dinner, where he reunites with old school friends. Tensions rise when the engagement ring goes missing, and later one of the school friends is murdered. Guest starring Harry Hadden-Paton as William Calthorpe, Pippa Nixon as Daphne Young and Carolina Main as Lilian Calthorpe. First appearance of Al Weaver as Leonard Finch.
3	3	"Episode 3"	Jill Robertson	Daisy Coulam	20 October 2014	6.23
Amanda asks a heartbroken Sidney to officiate at her wedding. Sidney investigates the death of a parishioner who predicted her future son-in-law would murder her. Mrs. Maguire calls Inspector Keating to investigate when the deceased's sister is also found dead. Guest starring Jean Marsh as Daisy Livingstone, Isla Blair as Gladys Sheppard, Kieran O'Brien as Arthur Evans and Mark Bonnar as Dr Robinson. First appearance of Nick Brimble as Jack Chapman.
4	4	"Episode 4"	Jill Robertson	Daisy Coulam	27 October 2014	6.54
Sidney rescues a parishioner from her burning home, but shortly afterwards her husband is stabbed to death in a public garden. As Sidney and Geordie investigate, they discover both incidents are related to illegal homosexual activity, revealing deep local and legal prejudices. Geordie is distracted when his baby son contracts a potentially fatal illness. (Note: While the story in this episode is not based on stories in the books, the murderer and motive are). Guest starring Flora Montgomery as Marion Taylor, Lee Williams as Dominic Taylor, Struan Rodger as Tobias Hall and Rory Fleck Byrne as Ben Blackwood.
5	5	"Episode 5"	Tim Fywell	Daisy Coulam	3 November 2014	6.42
Sidney and Geordie are invited to Straight 8's Jazz Club in London, owned by the father of Jennifer's boyfriend. When the boyfriend's sister is murdered, the investigation reveals ties to a murder committed years earlier and a police cover-up. Guest starring Peter Egan as Archie Johnson, Camilla Beeput as Gloria Dee, Nick Sidi as DCI Jacob Williams, Andy Beckwith as Tommy, Nakay Kpaka as Walter Sterling, and Ted Reilly as Justin.
6	6	"Episode 6"	Tim Fywell	Daisy Coulam	10 November 2014	6.37
Geordie is shot while he and Sidney investigate the shooting of a policeman. Sidney is shunned by the senior officer in charge when he finds a connection between the two shootings. Sidney's war flashbacks, Amanda's impending marriage, and Sidney's deception of Hildegard leave his private life in tatters. (Note: This episode is not based on stories in the books). Guest starring Adam James as James Heath, Natasha O'Keeffe as Grace Heath and Paul Hilton as Robert Miller.

=== Series 2 (2016) ===
No. overall	No. in series	Title	Directed by	Written by	Original release date	UK viewers (millions)
7	1	"Episode 1"	Tim Fywell	Daisy Coulam	2 March 2016	7.12
Sidney is accused of sexual assault by the father of 15-year-old Abigail Redmond, citing the evidence of her unseen diary. Geordie and Sidney find her body at a photographer's studio. Suspects include Daniel Marlowe, a gay photographer (who had taken and published adult photographs of Abigail without knowing her age), her possessive and violent father, and her school friend Gary Bell, a teenager with mental retardation. Sidney discovers Abigail was pregnant, and that his superiors in the church were hiding a secret – Sam Milburn, a fellow vicar with a dark past. Guest starring Andrew Knott as Sam Milburn. First appearance of Oliver Dimsdale as Daniel Marlowe.
8	2	"Episode 2"	Tim Fywell	John Jackson	9 March 2016	6.51
The apparent suicide of a daredevil lecturer, fallen from a spire of King's College chapel, leads Geordie and Sidney into the world of Soviet spies. Sidney knows the spire cannot be climbed alone. When a witness claims the lecturer was pushed, suspicion falls on the lecturer's star pupil. An official warns Geordie to drop the investigation. Amanda's husband, Guy, punches Sidney and tells him ti stay away from her. Guest starring Nigel Planer as Giles Montgomery, Lourdes Faberes as Mya Lyall, Matthew Tennyson as Kit Bartlett and Nicky Henson as Frank Archer.
9	3	"Episode 3"	David O'Neill	Daisy Coulam	16 March 2016	6.32
A young parishioner confesses to killing his landlord with a knife. Geordie and Sidney find the landlord alive and well. He is later killed in front of them by a hit-and-run driver. A knife wound leads them back to the young man, who has an alibi, and the landlord's manipulative wife, who says she doesn’t drive. Leonard, who is still in the closet, and Daniel Marlowe go on an awkward date at the cinema. Amanda, unhappy with Guy, returns to Grantchester and sees Sidney kissing his new girlfriend, Margaret. Guest starring Liz White as Vivian Whitaker, Michael Shaeffer as Eric Whitaker, Rosie Day as Joan Whitaker and Jeremy Neumark Jones as Theo Graham.
10	4	"Episode 4"	David O'Neill	Joshua St Johnston	23 March 2016	6.34
Gary Bell, a mentally-challenged teenager who had caused Abigail Redmond's death in a well-meaning accident, is tried for Abigail's murder. Sidney and Geordie's disagreement over the boy's case strains their friendship. A horse breeder is found hanged in his stable, just as his first wife was several months earlier. Sidney convinces Geordie they were both murdered by someone close to them. Amanda's disintegrating relationship with Guy leads her back to Grantchester, and Margaret becomes jealous. Meanwhile, Leonard struggles with his attraction to Daniel Marlowe. Guest starring Elliot Levey as Laszlo Herzl, Eliza Bennett as Kitty Lawson and Paul Nicholls as Reggie Lawson
11	5	"Episode 5"	Edward Bennett	Daisy Coulam	30 March 2016	6.10
Amanda promotes a petition to stop Gary's execution. A man arrested by Geordie for physically abusing his wife dies in his cell; suspicion falls on Geordie, who has bruised knuckles and was friendly with the man's wife, who had no legal grounds to hold the man as his wife would not make out a complaint. Margaret's statement about Geordie's state of mind causes Sidney to doubt his friend's innocence. Dead rats at the dead man's house provide another solution. Meanwhile, Leonard tries to come to terms with his homosexuality when Daniel Marlowe kisses him. Sidney is present at Gary's hanging; Geordie's testimony at the trial and Sidney's inability to stop the unjust execution drive him to drink. Guest starring Tanya Franks as Rita Jones and Steve Toussaint as Dicky Evans.
12	6	"Episode 6"	Edward Bennett	Daisy Coulam	6 April 2016	6.26
The events of the previous months and his broken friendship with Geordie prey heavily on Sidney. Sam Milburn, the disgraced vicar who had molested Abigail, returns to ask Sidney for forgiveness, and Abigail's father threatens to kill him. When blood is found on the girl's gravestone and Milburn disappears, Sidney seeks Geordie's help to find him. They discover he is lodging with the mother of a missing 14-year-old girl. Leonard uncovers evidence that the Archdeacon knew that Milburn was a serial abuser of young girls and tried to cover it up, but his celebratory mood is dashed by Daniel Marlowe, the gay photographer he has been stepping out with. Pregnant Amanda, unable to accept the future before her, leaves Guy and is disowned by her father; she turns to Sidney again for solace, and Sidney makes a choice that may alter his standing with the Church. Guest starring Andrew Knott as Sam Milburn.

=== Christmas Special (2016) ===
No. overall	No. in series	Title	Directed by	Written by	Original release date	UK viewers (millions)
13	1	"Christmas Special"	Edward Bennett	Daisy Coulam	24 December 2016	6.11
A groom fails to turn up for his wedding and is found dead at work following a break-in. The groom's bride, a striptease artist, her club boss, and the groom's son are suspected of murder. The discovery of two wedding rings stuffed in the victim's throat alludes to another suspect Geordie knows who he believes killed nine years earlier in the same way. Amanda's attempt at reconciliation with her father fails and she ends up homeless. Found by Leonard, as she is about to give birth, he takes her to the vicarage. The baby, Grace, born on the eve of Christmas Eve presents Sidney with the dilemma of another man's baby that Geordie equates with Joseph and Mary from the Bible. Guest starring Anna Chancellor as Aunt Cece, Julian Glover as Albert Tannen, Maimie McCoy as Linda Morgan, Enzo Cilenti as Felix Davis and Mariah Gale as Gail Tannen.

=== Series 3 (2017) ===
No. overall	No. in series	Title	Directed by	Written by	Original release date	UK viewers (millions)
14	1	"Episode 1"	Tim Fywell	Daisy Coulam	23 April 2017	6.95
Sidney receives a dead crow and a series of anonymous phone calls. Geordie calls Sidney to see the body of a respected doctor found dead in the church, together with a dead crow. A connection between Sidney and the doctor is the funeral he conducted of a matron three months earlier. Both the doctor and matron worked at a mental institution. Amanda's husband, Guy, wishes to see his baby daughter, and Sidney ponders his relationship with her. A new archdeacon tells Leonard about his responsibilities to the church, and Leonard gathers that the Church would like to see him married in order for him to be promoted to his own parish. Geordie's marriage is strained when his feelings for his secretary, Margaret, come to the fore. Guest starring Susannah Harker as Veronica Stone and Sian Webber as Ivy Franklin.
15	2	"Episode 2"	Tim Fywell	John Jackson	30 April 2017	6.43
While playing cricket for the local cricket side, Sidney and Geordie find racism rearing its ugly head against Pakistani batsman, Zafar Ali. After a disputed decision the game is forfeited by the team captain, local solicitor, Geoff Towler. After the match, the teams go down with mild arsenic poisoning from tainted beer. The following morning, Zafar Ali is found dead from the same poison with a myriad of suspects including Geoff Towler and his daughter, Annie, who was secretly in love with Zafar. Amanda seeks a divorce but the law requires grounds such as adultery and the church does not allow priests to marry divorcees. Sidney discovers Geordie's affair with his secretary, placing him in a dilemma with Geordie's wife. Guest starring Peter Davison as Geoff Towler and Emma Davies as Rosie Towler.
16	3	"Episode 3"	Rebecca Gatward	Daisy Coulam and Oliver Frampton	7 May 2017	6.27
Leonard and his new lady friend, Hilary, are witnesses to an armed robbery at the post office, and they identify garage owner, Walter Dunn, a known felon, as the robber. Geordie arms himself and his fellow officers to arrest Dunn, but finds him in his office above his garage, shot dead. Geordie arrests Dunn's wife and her garage mechanic lover. A second armed robbery, wounding the postal clerk, leads to suspects nearer to home. Amanda and Guy agree to arrange a divorce with him as the adulterer. Geordie continues his affair with Margaret, Leonard proposes to Hilary, and Sidney finally gives in to his feelings for Amanda. Guest starring Holly Aird as Alice Dunn and Charles Dale as Cyril Parker.
17	4	"Episode 4"	Rebecca Gatward	Daisy Coulam	14 May 2017	6.34
Josephine Sutton is found fatally injured following a fall at her factory workplace. A time discrepancy and other clues lead Geordie to suspect she was injured elsewhere. Mrs Maguire's husband, missing for 10 years, returns with disturbing news (Mrs M had accepted a proposal of marriage but is now not single). Sidney cannot reconcile his love for Amanda with his faith. Leonard's relationship with Hilary becomes difficult. Believing he is an abomination because of his sexuality, he attempts suicide. Geordie buys Margaret a necklace. Geordie finds his investigation hampered by his own colleagues, whom he realises are freemasons, as is the factory owner. Geordie's affair is exposed. Sidney makes a decision to make time to think. Guest starring Charlie Higson as Ronnie Maguire, Christopher Fulford as Ezra Garston, Penny Layden as Maud Sutton and Adrian Lukis as Superintendent John Baldwin.
18	5	"Episode 5"	Rob Evans	Jess Williams	21 May 2017	5.61
Sidney leaves his clerical collar behind and hitchhikes across the country to find Ronnie, Mrs Maguire's husband, at a Romany camp and recover the money he had taken. Geordie's wife throws him out of their home. Sidney discovers Ronnie has another family and news of this and the money goes through the camp. When Ronnie is murdered and the money goes missing, the Romanies seek their own justice. Mrs Maguire seeks out the other Mrs Maguire with Geordie's help while Sidney seeks the killer in the underlying tensions of the camp. Geordie ends his relationship with Margaret. Amanda gives Sidney an ultimatum. Guest starring Charlie Higson as Ronnie Maguire, Lorraine Ashbourne as Cora Maguire, Alexa Davies as Luella, Adrian Bower as Pal and Ewan Mitchell as Abraham.
19	6	"Episode 6"	Rob Evans	Daisy Coulam	28 May 2017	5.79
It is September 1955 and Sidney has lost his faith in the church and writes a resignation letter. When a boy, Archie Reilly, claims he was nearly abducted, his story is doubted by his father and Geordie. Archie's brother Jacob then goes missing. A scarf Archie saw leads to an all-female college where his father teaches and where he has a number of relationships with his students. Geordie's behaviour grows more and more unstable as he wrestles with family problems and violently takes it out on a suspect, a troubled friend of Sidney's. As the vicar grows closer to the truth about the missing child, he is forced to choose between his love for Amanda and his faith when he realises the community needs him more than ever. Mrs Maguire marries Jack Chapman and at the wedding reception, Leonard and Geordie renew their respective relationships. Guest starring Sam Hoare, Neil Jackson as Richard Reilly, Perdita Weeks as Charlotte Reilly and Emma Appleton as Sally. Last appearance of Morven Christie as Amanda Hopkins.

=== Series 4 (2019) ===
No. overall	No. in series	Title	Directed by	Written by	Original release date	UK viewers (millions)
20	1	"Episode 1"	Tim Fywell	Daisy Coulam	11 January 2019	6.10
It is 1956 and with Amanda long gone, Sidney's life now revolves around the church services and the interminable meetings of the Parochial Council and their plans for a village fete. He yearns for some excitement, and Geordie has noticed that Sidney's devil-may-care attitude feels increasingly like a death wish. Sidney Chambers attends a talk by the Reverend Nathaniel Todd, a key part of the Civil Rights Movement in the USA. During the event, protestors disrupt Todd's speech and release fireworks, causing the audience to panic and leading to a crush as dozens of people try to escape through a locked door. In the chaos, a man is stabbed and killed by an unseen assailant. The murder sees racial tensions spike and Geordie is called in to investigate. Guest starring Paterson Joseph as Reverend Nathaniel Todd and Samuel West as Professor Henry Barkley. First appearances of Tom Brittney as Will Davenport and Bradley Hall as Larry Peters.
21	2	"Episode 2"	Tim Fywell	Daisy Coulam	18 January 2019	5.24
Sidney discovers he was the last person to see a woman alive during a drunken night. While he struggles to remember what happened, Geordie becomes concerned for his friend's troubled state of mind. Sidney reconnects and falls for Violet Todd. Violet is involved in the Civil Rights Movement and is soon to return to America, so a future with her appears impossible. However, Sidney chooses to emigrate to America to be with her. Guest starring Nicholas Rowe as Rupert Simpson, Patrick Baladi as Archer Davis, Katie Clarkson-Hill as Sadie Parker, Diarmaid Murtagh as Rory Dale and Sofia Oxenham as Lottie. Final appearance of James Norton as Sidney Chambers.
22	3	"Episode 3"	Stewart Svaasand	John Jackson	25 January 2019	5.30
Geordie is called to investigate an apparent break-in at a computer laboratory. Geordie suspects foul play when computer laboratory head Professor Simms keels over and dies from mercury poisoning. It seems the deceased recently spent the night in the lab with someone other than his wife, possibly a fellow educated man. Geordie seeks advice from Leonard, and the pair start to uncover the surprisingly messy love lives of Simms' colleagues. Elsewhere, Cathy is brutally tricked, Will returns to Grantchester and Mrs C makes a shocking discovery. Guest starring Zoe Telford as Jean Simms, Charlie Hamblett as Tim Amery and Marli Siu as Karla Read.
23	4	"Episode 4"	Stewart Svaasand	Rachael New	1 February 2019	5.23
As Will is preparing to be installed as the new vicar, Geordie persuades him to involve himself in a case involving a young uncommunicative boy with blood on his hands. Mrs C is anxious about Will's relaxed attitude, but that's just Will's nature. As he tells the Archdeacon, he's never been more sure of anything. The clock is ticking for Will to uncover the truth and help the family heal, but his own troubled past threatens to colour his view of the case – and Geordie realises his new friend has demons of his own. Guest starring Alex Hassell as Ernest Carter, Emma Corrin as Esther Carter and Eileen Davies as Clara Carter.
24	5	"Episode 5"	Rob Evans	Daisy Coulam	8 February 2019	5.15
Will gets a phone call from home as his father has got himself into some trouble. His father disapproves of Will's career choice as he wants him to take over the running of his estate. Will asks Geordie for his help when a vicious beating leads to a grisly murder at his ancestral home. Will is settling into the new routines of his life in Grantchester: sermons and services in the church, working the punch bag at the gym and suffering sniping comments from Leonard in the vicarage. But then an unexpected phone call summons Will back home, and he asks Geordie for his help: Will's father has got himself into some trouble. It is a chance for Geordie to discover where Will really comes from, and it is not what he expected, taking him into a very unfamiliar – and unfriendly – world. Will has not been home in a while, running from a past he wants to forget. But you cannot outrun it forever, and when one vicious beating leads to a grisly murder at a sprawling ancestral home, scandal threatens to engulf the Davenport family, and life will never be the same for Will again. Guest starring Nathaniel Parker as Thomas Davenport, Rachel Pickup as Meredith, Robert Portal as Eddie and Christopher Fairbank as Eli Roper.
25	6	"Episode 6"	Rob Evans	Jamie Crichton	15 February 2019	5.40
Will, upset by his family tragedy and faced with life-changing choices, seeks distraction in Geordie's world. A strange new case unfolds: the murder of a Teddy Boy at a dance hall, which in Geordie's opinion is proof that the country has truly gone to the dogs. The dead boy's pockets reveal a library card from the school Geordie's daughter Esme attends and, even more alarming, a picture of Esme herself. Esme claims ignorance, but Will knows something is up, given he's spotted her hiding a love letter. Away from her life at the vicarage, Mrs C is feeling lost, while Cathy is left shaken by another encounter at work. Leonard is adrift, hiding at Daniel's house and reeling from his encounter with Will. Guest starring Joseph Millson as Mr Pope, Richard Cunningham as Mr Draper and Samuel Blenkin as Kevin Moran.

=== Series 5 (2020) ===
No. overall	No. in series	Title	Directed by	Written by	Original release date	UK viewers (millions)
26	1	"Episode 1"	Gordon Anderson	John Jackson	10 January 2020	5.45
Will's mother informs him about a new man in her life.
27	2	"Episode 2"	Gordon Anderson	Carey Andrews	17 January 2020	5.65
28	3	"Episode 3"	Christiana Ebohon	Jake Riddell	24 January 2020	4.51
Will and journalist Ellie go to the movies. But a brutal murder cuts the date short.
29	4	"Episode 4"	Christiana Ebohon	Joshua St Johnston	31 January 2020	4.64
30	5	"Episode 5"	Rob Evans	Daisy Coulam	7 February 2020	6.22
31	6	"Episode 6"	Rob Evans	Daisy Coulam	14 February 2020	5.35

=== Series 6 (2021) ===
No. overall	No. in series	Title	Directed by	Written by	Original release date	UK viewers (millions)
32	1	"Episode 1"	Rob Evans	Daisy Coulam	3 September 2021	4.83
Guest starring Rachael Stirling as Margie Danker.
33	2	"Episode 2"	Rob Evans	John Jackson	10 September 2021	4.60
First appearance of Melissa Johns as Jennifer Scott.
34	3	"Episode 3"	Rob Evans	Richard Cookson	17 September 2021	4.14
35	4	"Episode 4"	Rob Evans	Louise Ironside	24 September 2021	4.64
36	5	"Episode 5"	Jermain Julien	Daisy Coulam	1 October 2021	4.57
As the day of Leonard's trial dawns, Will and Geordie investigate a robbery.
37	6	"Episode 6"	Jermain Julien	Tolula Dada	8 October 2021	4.84
CND Group leader Rachel Bromilow falls to her death, and Will and Geordie discover her death is not as accidental as first thought.
38	7	"Episode 7"	Jermain Julien	Daisy Coulam	15 October 2021	4.71
When Leonard's prison inmate, Joe Davies, is accused of murdering another prisoner, he asks Will and Geordie for help.
39	8	"Episode 8"	Jermain Julien	John Jackson	22 October 2021	4.88

=== Series 7 (2022) ===
No. overall	No. in series	Title	Directed by	Written by	Original release date	UK viewers (millions)
40	1	"Episode 1"	Tim Fywell	Louise Ironside	11 March 2022	4.62
Lord Edmund Fitzgerald is found dead on his family estate, and Will and Geordie find themselves at odds with new boss DCI Elliot Wallace over whether he was murdered.
41	2	"Episode 2"	Tim Fywell	Daisy Coulam	18 March 2022	4.02
Lester Carmichael, part of the husband-and-wife team who own the Carmichael's cleaning goods brand, is found dead with a rather unusual neck wound. Will and Geordie's investigation leads them to look into Lester's private life. First appearance of Charlotte Ritchie as Bonnie Evans.
42	3	"Episode 3"	Tom Brittney	Daisy Coulam	25 March 2022	4.16
A vagrant is found dead in the doorway of Leonard's cafe. Geordie thinks this murder could be connected to the two previous cases.
43	4	"Episode 4"	Katherine Churcher	Daisy Coulam and Tumi Belo	1 April 2022	4.20
A member of Will's congregation is murdered just before a church fundraising event. Secrets emerge that make Will question how well he really knows any of his parishioners.
44	5	"Episode 5"	Katherine Churcher	Richard Cookson	8 April 2022	4.70
There's a murder at a local old folks' home and two of its elderly residents go missing. Will and Geordie try to track them down.
45	6	"Episode 6"	Katherine Churcher	John Jackson	15 April 2022	3.75
Another homeless man is found dead, clean-shaven and killed in the same manner as the previous victims. Geordie and Will realise that they may have sent the wrong man to prison. In the end, Will finally falls in love with Bonnie.

=== Series 8 (2024) ===
Production on the eighth series began in August 2022, with broadcast originally set for early 2023, as per the usual broadcast schedule. However, due to scheduling conflicts, the series did not arrive on UK screens until January 2024, despite the DVD of the series being made available on August 16, 2023. Series 8 also aired in the US ahead of its UK broadcast on PBS Masterpiece from 9 July to 13 August 2023.

No. overall	No. in series	Title	Directed by	Written by	Original release date	UK viewers (millions)
46	1	"Episode 1"	Rob Evans	Richard Cookson	11 January 2024	3.44
A motorcycle race brings much excitement to town, until the evening after the race, when a deaf rider is found bludgeoned to death beside his bike.
47	2	"Episode 2"	Rob Evans	Daisy Coulam	18 January 2024	3.20
Will is devastated to be responsible for a motorcycle accident which results in the death of an innocent pedestrian. But faced with the prospect of losing his best friend, Geordie goes against his boss to try and uncover if the pedestrian really was an innocent party.
48	3	"Episode 3"	Al Weaver	Helen Black	25 January 2024	3.15
A rare painting is set to be unveiled at a college exhibition, but during a protest involving a group of naked women, it is stolen. Matters are further complicated when one of the college porters is found murdered in his dormitory.
49	4	"Episode 4"	Rob Evans	Anita Vettesse	1 February 2024	3.10
When a resident of the halfway house is found murdered, Leonard is bereft.
50	5	"Episode 5"	Martin Smith	Richard Cookson and Karla Williams	8 February 2024	3.06
A local doctor is poisoned upon visiting a drinking club, but with Geordie consigned to desk duty by DCI Wallace, Larry and Miss Scott team up to find out who was responsible. Meanwhile, Will's struggles push him further away from his family and friends.
51	6	"Episode 6"	Rob Evans	Daisy Coulam	15 February 2024	2.97
Unable to face up to his guilt, Will disappears, and find himself in a sleepy village just outside of Colchester - and unknowingly, slap bang in the middle of a long standing family feud which has just boiled over, with fatal consequences.

=== Series 9 (2025) ===
Production on the ninth series began in 2023, but due to the delayed broadcast of Series 8, was not broadcast until 2025.

No. overall	No. in series	Title	Directed by	Written by	Original release date	UK viewers (millions)
52	1	"Episode 1"	Katherine Churcher	Richard Cookson	8 January 2025	3.36
The circus arrives in Grantchester, but celebrations are brought to a halt when a magician is found dead, having been shot with the arrow from his own trick. Meanwhile, Will is surprised to receive an offer of a new job from the bishop.
53	2	"Episode 2"	Katherine Churcher	Daisy Coulam	15 January 2025	3.20
Will is forced to make his decision. Meanwhile, a death in a local hotel and a baby left abandoned in the church appear to be connected, leading Geordie and the team to a local girls' school. Final appearances of Tom Brittney as Will Davenport and Charlotte Ritchie as Bonnie Davenport.
54	3	"Episode 3"	Katherine Churcher	Daisy Coulam	22 January 2025	3.23
A wealthy landowner is being buried, the first job for new vicar Reverend Alphy Kotteram - but when the son of the deceased claims he was murdered and did not take his own life as the coroner ruled, Geordie finds himself trying to induce Will's successor to help him solve the case. First appearance of Rishi Nair as Alphy Kotteram.
55	4	"Episode 4"	Al Weaver	Nessa Muthy	29 January 2025	3.33
In an attempt to raise funds for church repairs, Alphy is sent to a dinner party hosted by local millionaires Lord and Lady Marwood. But when a game of hide and seek uncovers the body of a missing gardener, events take a slightly unexpected turn.
56	5	"Episode 5"	Al Weaver	Story by : Kacey Ainsworth; Teleplay by : Daisy Coulam	5 February 2025	3.22
With the pending merger of Grantchester church with another parish, Alphy is informed by the bishop that his position will cease to exist in the coming months. Meanwhile, a death at Esme's place of work sees Miss Scott go undercover to rat out the killer amongst a group of misogynistic office boys who see women as a form of sport.
57	6	"Episode 6"	Rob Evans	Ayeesha Menon	12 February 2025	3.27
A local farmer uncovers a skeleton on his land, which turns out to be that of a Roman soldier. Excitement builds as an archaeological dig comes to town, until the archaeologist is bludgeoned to death with his own claw hammer. Meanwhile, a break-in at the vicarage sees Alphy becoming more and more concerned that someone is out to get him.
58	7	"Episode 7"	Rob Evans	Richard Cookson	19 February 2025	3.27
A college student with whom Alphy shared a night of passion mysteriously disappears, and one of her journalist colleagues is later found with his throat cut. Meanwhile, Leonard is threatened when he begins to see Sam's true colours.
59	8	"Episode 8"	Rob Evans	Richard Cookson and Daisy Coulam	26 February 2025	3.35
When a man falls to his death from a third floor window in Cambridge city centre, a pattern of events surrounding Sam begins to emerge. But Geordie and Alphy aren't the only ones to have connected the dots, leaving Leonard in grave danger.

=== Series 10 (2026) ===
Production on the tenth series began in 2024 and aired on ITV at 9pm Wednesdays from 7 January 2026. The series aired in 2025 on PBS Masterpiece in the United States.

No. overall	No. in series	Title	Directed by	Written by	Original release date	UK viewers (millions)
60	1	"Episode 1"	Rob Evans	Daisy Coulam	7 January 2026	N/A
The Easter celebrations in Grantchester are disrupted by a suspicious death.
61	2	"Episode 2"	Rob Evans	Richard Cookson	8 January 2026	N/A
A death at the university plunges Geordie and Alphy into a world of academic adversaries.
62	3	"Episode 3"	Rob Evans	Daisy Coulam	14 January 2026	N/A
Alphy's attempt to cook a romantic dinner is interrupted by a familiar face arriving unannounced at the vicarage.
63	4	"Episode 4"	B. Welby	Nessah Muthy	21 January 2026	N/A
Alphy and Geordie investigate witchcraft at a home for orphaned and disadvantaged children, where Alphy struggles to consider an old friend as a suspect when a body is found.
64	5	"Episode 5"	B. Welby	Daisy Coulam	28 January 2026	N/A
Leonard's drinking leads to a prison cell, and the consequences escalate from there.
65	6	"Episode 6"	Al Weaver	Maya Sondhi	4 February 2026	N/A
Alphy and Geordie investigate the murder of a rock band member, and Alphy struggles with some family history.
66	7	"Episode 7"	Al Weaver	Richard Cookson	12 February 2026	N/A
Cathy and Mrs. Chapman's new business venture faces a challenge, and Geordie tries to intervene in Alphy's personal life unbeknownst to Alphy.
67	8	"Episode 8"	Al Weaver	Daisy Coulam	19 February 2026	N/A
Alphy and Geordie keep an eye on rising tensions as a controversial figure is invited to speak at the university. When a murder is committed, however, they disagree on how to approach the case.

=== Series 11 (2027) ===
Production on the eleventh and final series began in 2025 and is scheduled to air on ITV in early 2027. It aired on PBS in June-August 2026.

== Viewership ==
Grantchester : UK viewers per episode (millions)

Series	Episode number								Average
Series	1	2	3	4	5	6	7	8	Average
1	7.69	6.51	6.23	6.54	6.42	6.37	–		6.63
2	7.12	6.51	6.32	6.34	6.10	6.26	–		6.44
3	6.95	6.43	6.27	6.34	5.61	5.79	–		6.23
4	6.10	5.24	5.30	5.23	5.15	5.40	–		5.43
5	5.45	5.65	4.51	4.64	6.22	5.35	–		5.50
6	4.83	4.60	4.14	4.64	4.57	4.84	4.71	4.88	4.65
7	4.62	4.02	4.16	4.20	4.70	3.75	–		4.17
8	3.44	3.20	3.15	3.10	3.06	2.97	–		3.15
9	3.36	3.20	3.23	3.33	3.22	3.27	3.27	3.35	3.28
Special	6.11	–							N/A

Audience measurement performed by Broadcasters' Audience Research Board
