= Melissa Johns =

English actress

Melissa Johns is a British actress and disability activist. She is known for playing Sadie in The Interceptor, Imogen Pascoe on Coronation Street, Hannah Taylor in Life, and Jennifer Scott in Grantchester. Johns is an ambassador for disability in the arts and advocates for better representation of disability on- and off-screen and stage.

== Early life ==
Johns was born in Herefordshire and grew up in the town of Ledbury, where she attended John Masefield High School. She was born without her right forearm and hand. Johns is from a working-class background and references this in her speeches.

Johns trained at East 15 Acting School (University of Essex) and since graduating has worked in TV, theatre, and radio. During her time at East 15, she was one of the first disabled actors to win the Laurence Olivier Bursary Award.

== Accolades ==
Between 2017 and 2020, Johns won several awards, including JCI's Ten Outstanding Young Persons in the U.K, Shaw Trust's Power List, U.K's 100 most influential disabled people, JCI's Ten Outstanding Young Persons of the World, and she was shortlisted for Positive Role Model of the Year Award in the National Diversity Awards.

In 2019, she was selected as one of 21 actors for the BAFTA Elevate programme. The same year, she was picked as Alumna of the Year 2019 for the University of Essex & East 15 Acting School for her disability advocacy in the arts.

== Phone hack ==
In 2018, Johns' smartphone was hacked and intimate photos were released. Johns used the situation to speak out against body shaming and combat taboos around disability, sex, and body dysmorphia.

The experience inspired the BBC Radio 4 drama In My Own Skin, written by Debbie Oates with Johns, and starring Johns.

== Selected filmography ==
List of film appearances, with year, title, and role shown
Year	Title	Role	Notes
2015	The Interceptor	Sadie	8 episodes
2017–19	Coronation Street	Imogen Pascoe	12 episodes
2020	Life	Hannah Taylor	6 episodes
2021–25	Grantchester	Jennifer Scott	31 episodes
2024	Queenie	Janet	2 episodes
2024	Black Ops	Paula	1 episode
2025	Father Brown	Cecily Derbyshire	Episode: "Battle of Kembleford"
2025	Midsomer Murders	Lana Markham	Episode: "A Climate of Death"
2025	Adolescence	Carla	1 episode
