= John Masefield High School =

School in Ledbury, England

Location
- Mabel's Furlong, Ledbury, HR8-2HF; United Kingdom; 52.0318°N 2.4234°W

Information
- Type: Academy
- Trust: JOHN MASEFIELD HIGH SCHOOL AND SIXTH FORM CENTRE UID 3563
- Department for Education URN: 136803 Tables
- Faculty: Arts
- Enrollment: 909
- Colors: Bottle Blue, Daisy yellow
- Newspaper: Update and a newsletter
- Website: www.jmhs.hereford.sch.uk

John Masefield High School is a secondary school with an academy status, located in Ledbury, Herefordshire, England. It is named after the poet John Masefield.

== Description ==
The school lies to the south of the small town of Ledbury adjacent to the A449, with a campus enclosed by housing. Crossing the A449 one enters Ledbury Park and the grounds of Eastnor Castle. It is an average-sized rural comprehensive school with a sixth form that converted from local authority control to become a single school academy in 2011. At that time it was rated by Ofsted as a "good" school and it has remained so.

The main building is a collection of two storey blocks, 10.4 metres (34 ft) to the ridge; facing-brick with concrete frames, glass and blue cladding and plain clay tiles to the vertical panels to the gables.

== Academics ==
The curriculum at John Masefield High School is focused on enabling students to enjoy their studies and to maximise their achievement irrespective of their abilities. Students start by studying French and German in year 7. Either or both of these languages can be studied in Key Stage 4, and continued as A-levels.

The programme of study ensures students follow a full National Curriculum programme at Key Stages 3 and 4, and are challenged, whether they have chosen an academic or more vocational pathway at Key Stages 4, and later in the sixth form (Key Stage 5). Students mainly follow GCSE courses, but certain BTEC programmes and other modes of certification are offered.

In response to the changing nature of GCSEs, the school operates a two-year Key Stage 3, allowing three years for Key Stage 4.

== Notable alumni ==
Melissa Johns, known for her work in acting and disability activism, was a pupil at the school from 2001 to 2008. She specialised in the performing arts.

Adam Willis, known for winning the Turner Prize in 2015, attended the school, including the Sixth Form centre.

Joe Cross, known for his victory at the 2026 Commonwealth Games Track Cycling event, attended the school from 2011-2016.
