= He Knew He Was Right =

1869 novel by Anthony Trollope

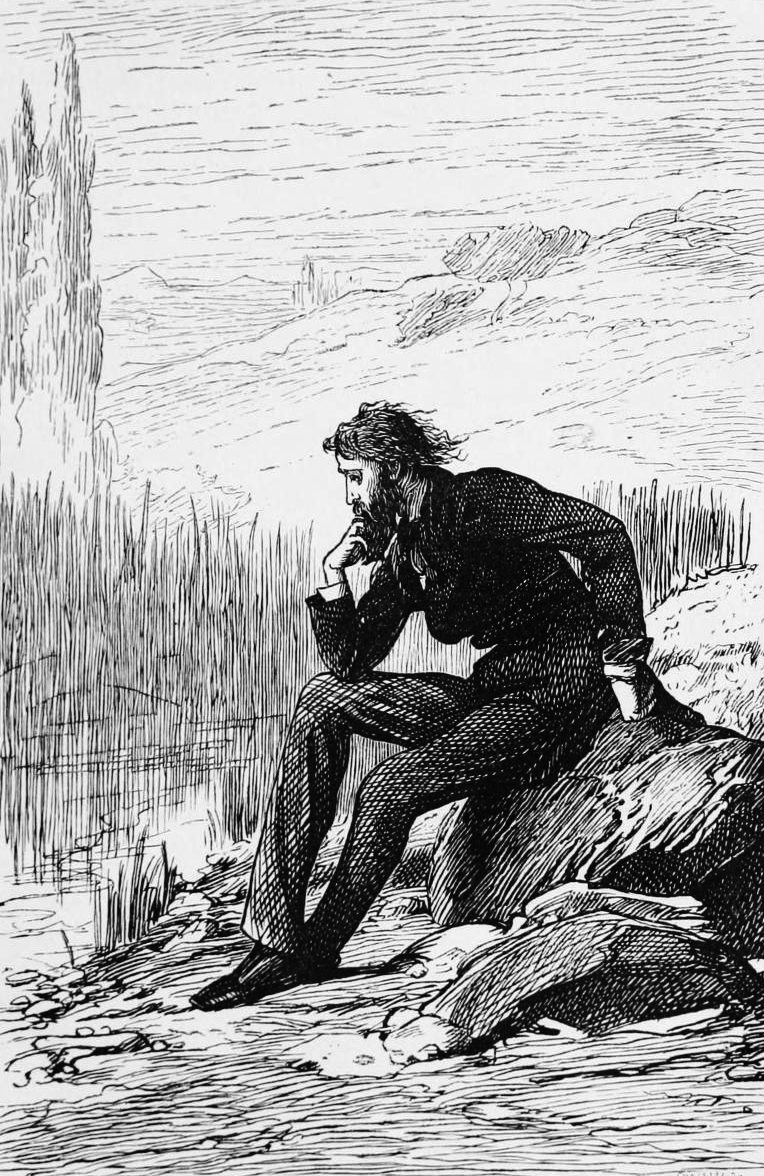
- Trevelyan at Casalunga by Marcus Stone
- Author: Anthony Trollope
- Illustrator: Marcus Stone
- Language: English
- Publisher: Strahan and Co.
- Publication date: 22 May 1869
- Publication place: United Kingdom
- Pages: 959
- Text: He Knew He Was Right online

He Knew He Was Right is an 1869 novel written by Anthony Trollope which describes the failure of a marriage caused by the unreasonable jealousy of a husband exacerbated by the stubbornness of a willful wife. As is common with Trollope's works, there are also several substantial subplots. Trollope makes constant allusions to Shakespeare's Othello throughout the novel. Trollope considered this work to be a failure; he viewed the main character as unsympathetic, and the secondary characters and plots as much more lively and interesting, but it is one of his best-known novels. It was adapted for BBC One in 2004 by Andrew Davies.

== Plot summary ==
A wealthy young English gentleman, Louis Trevelyan, visits the fictional Mandarin Islands, a distant British possession, and becomes smitten with Emily Rowley, the eldest daughter of the governor, Sir Marmaduke Rowley. The Rowleys accompany Trevelyan to London, where he marries Emily. When the rest of the family goes home, Emily's sister Nora remains behind, under Trevelyan's protection.

The marriage is initially a happy one and the couple have a baby boy. Then a seemingly minor matter undermines their marriage. Colonel Osborne, an old friend of Sir Marmaduke's, visits Emily much too frequently for her husband's taste. Though nothing improper occurs, Trevelyan orders his wife to avoid the man in future. Emily resents his lack of trust and makes no attempt to hide it. Their relationship deteriorates to the point that they separate.

Meanwhile, Nora attracts two admirers, the wealthy Charles Glascock, the eldest son and heir of Lord Peterborough, and Hugh Stanbury, a close friend of Trevelyan's from their days at Oxford University. Stanbury ekes out a precarious living writing newspaper articles. Glascock proposes to Nora, but despite the fact that Stanbury has given no indication of his feelings for her, she rejects the future nobleman, not without a great deal of struggle and much to the dismay of her friends.

Another subplot involves Jemima Stanbury, the capricious, formidable spinster aunt of Hugh. In her youth, she had been engaged to the eldest son of a leading banker. They had had a falling out and parted company, but upon his demise, he had left everything to her, making her very wealthy. Aware of the poverty of Hugh's branch of the family, she had generously paid for his education and helped him get a start in life. However, when he chose to work for what she considered to be a radical publication, the staunch Tory withdrew her support. She then offers to accept one of Hugh's sisters as a companion. After some debate, the timid and unassertive Dorothy Stanbury is sent to live with her.

Trevelyan arranges to have Emily and Nora live with Hugh's mother and her other daughter, Priscilla. However, Emily obstinately receives a visit from Colonel Osborne, against all advice to the contrary. Trevelyan finds out and becomes further maddened.

In the meantime, Aunt Stanbury tries to promote a marriage between her niece Dorothy and a favoured clergyman, Mr Gibson. This causes much resentment with Arabella and Camilla French, two sisters who had considered him a future husband for one of them (though which was still a matter of much debate). However, this plan is derailed.

Aunt Stanbury had always intended to bequeath her wealth back to the Burgess family, rather than to her Stanbury relations. She had chosen as her heir Brooke Burgess, the nephew of her former fiancé. When he visits her for the first time as an adult, everyone is charmed by his warm, lively personality, especially Dorothy. When Gibson finally proposes to her, she cannot avoid unfavourably comparing him to Brooke and declines. Her aunt is at first much put out by Dorothy's obstinacy. Eventually however, she places the blame on the clergyman, which results in a serious breach between them.

The feud with his former patron leaves Gibson so distracted that he finds himself engaged to a domineering Camilla French. After a while, he comes to regret his choice. Finally, finding Camilla's overpowering personality unbearable, he extricates himself by agreeing to marry the milder Arabella instead. Camilla is driven to extravagant threats and is finally sent to stay with her stern uncle in the period leading up to the wedding.

Then Aunt Stanbury becomes very ill, resulting in Dorothy and Brooke spending a good deal of time in each other's company. Brooke takes the opportunity to propose to an unsuspecting Dorothy. She however is reluctant to accept, fearing that her aunt will disinherit Brooke. Instead, the old woman blames her niece. They quarrel and Dorothy returns to her mother.

Aunt Stanbury misses Dorothy greatly and makes it known that she would welcome her back, though she still vehemently opposes her marriage to Brooke. Dorothy does come back, and even tries to break off her engagement, but Brooke will not stand for it. In the end, Aunt Stanbury's love for her niece is stronger than her desires and she gives her blessing to their wedding.

Meanwhile, Trevelyan departs England to escape the shame he feels. During his aimless wanderings, he meets Mr Glascock, who is on his way to Italy to visit his father. They encounter two attractive young American ladies, Caroline and Olivia Spalding. Glascock's father is in such poor health that the son is obliged to remain in the country to await his probable demise. While waiting, he courts and wins Caroline's hand in marriage, despite her misgivings about her reception in English society.

Trevelyan receives word that Colonel Osborne has dared to visit Emily once again. While Osborne had not been permitted to see Emily, Trevelyan does not believe it and has the boy taken away from his mother by deception; he takes his son back to Italy, where he descends further into madness. Eventually, he is tracked down by his wife and friends. Emily persuades him first to give her their son, then to return with her to England; he dies, however, shortly after their return. In his dying moments, Emily begs Louis to kiss her hand to signify that he does not believe she did anything wrong. Whether or not he does is unclear, but Emily believes "the verdict of the dying man had been given in her favour." A few months later, Hugh Stanbury and Nora marry.

== Characters of the novel ==
=== Main characters ===
- Louis Trevelyan
- Emily Trevelyan, wife of Louis Trevelyan and mother of his son, Louey
- Sir Marmaduke Rowley, governor of the Mandarin Islands and father of eight daughters, including the eldest, Emily Trevelyan
- Lady Rowley, wife of Sir Marmaduke Rowley
- Nora Rowley, second daughter of Sir Marmaduke and Lady Rowley
- Colonel Osborne, friend of Sir Marmaduke Rowley and godfather of Emily Trevelyan
- Hugh Stanbury, journalist working for the Daily Record and friend of Louis Trevelyan
- Miss Jemima Stanbury, spinster who lives in the Cathedral Close in Exeter, aunt and former benefactor of Hugh Stanbury
- Dorothy Stanbury, sister of Hugh Stanbury
- Charles Glascock, wealthy son and heir of Lord Peterborough
- Thomas Gibson, "one of the minor canons" in Devonshire, who marries Arabella French
- Brooke Burgess, a member of the Burgess family and a clerk in London

=== Minor characters ===
- Priscilla Stanbury, sister of Hugh and Dorothy Stanbury
- Mrs Stanbury, mother of Hugh, Priscilla and Dorothy Stanbury
- Lady Milborough
- Mr Samuel Bozzle, former policeman and private detective employed by Louis Trevelyan
- Mrs Bozzle
- Lucy Rowley, daughter of Sir Marmaduke and Lady Rowley
- Sophia Rowley, daughter of Sir Marmaduke and Lady Rowley
- Barty Burgess, banker and enemy of Aunt Stanbury
- Camilla French
- Arabella French
- Mrs French, mother of Camilla and Arabella French
- Jonas Crump, brother of Mrs French
- Mrs Crocket, publican
- Mr Outhouse, vicar of St Diddulph's and uncle of Emily and Nora
- Mrs Outhouse
- Caroline Spalding, American who marries Charles Glascock
- Miss Wallachia Petrie, American feminist visiting Italy with the Spalding family, close friend of Caroline Spalding
- Count Buonarosci, an Italian
- Dr Nevill, doctor who tends to Louis Trevelyan during his illness
- Mrs McHugh, friend of Jemima Stanbury
- Martha, Jemima Stanbury's maid

== Background ==
He Knew He Was Right was the first book written by Anthony Trollope after resigning his former position in the Post Office in 1867. He started writing in November 1867, and finished the book while staying in America in spring 1868. It was published by Virtue and Co in 32 weekly sixpenny volumes from 27 October 1868 to 12 May 1869; it was then published in monthly bound parts from November 1869. The novel was finally published by Strahan and Co in two official volumes on 22 May 1869, with illustrations by Marcus Stone. As well as being the longest novel Anthony Trollope would ever write, it was also the one for which he received the most payment, with Virtue and Co paying him £3,200.

== Major themes ==
One of the main themes of the novel is obsession, and the deleterious impact that this can have on people's lives. Louis Trevelyan's single-minded belief in his wife's adultery (as implied by the title) leads to his downfall, while Miss Jemima Stanbury is similarly obsessed with her money and social status. Bozzle's determination to prove Emily Trevelyan's unfaithfulness is similarly portrayed as obsessive, gradually breaking the rules of good taste and compassion as his investigations continue. The book's title makes this theme explicit; the characters who 'Know They Are Right' display stubbornness, obsession and a manic pursuit of their goals that leads to madness.

== In popular culture ==
The residents of Edward Everett Hale's "The Brick Moon" ask Earth "who proved Right in 'He Knew He Was Right.'" Their friends reply "SHE."
