= Harley Street (TV series) =

British television series

- Genre: Medical drama
- Created by: Marston Bloom
- Starring: Paul Nicholls; Suranne Jones; Kim Medcalf; Lucy Brown; Oliver Dimsdale; Cush Jumbo
- Composers: Jim Williams; John Lunn
- Country of origin: United Kingdom
- Original language: English
- No. of series: 1
- No. of episodes: 6

Production
- Executive producers: Christopher Aird; Gareth Neame; Sally Woodward Gentle
- Producer: Joy Spink
- Production locations: Marylebone, London, England, UK
- Running time: 47 minutes
- Production company: Carnival Films

Original release
- Network: ITV
- Release: 17 July – 21 August 2008

Harley Street is a British television medical drama shown on ITV from 17 July to 21 August 2008.

The series was made by Carnival Films and was set in Harley Street, London. Created by Marston Bloom and written by Howard Overman, Jack Williams, and Nicole Taylor, the stories were about the lives of Harley Street specialists and the cases that were presented to them.

== Cast ==
- Paul Nicholls as Robert Fielding
- Suranne Jones as Martha Eliot
- Shaun Parkes as Ekkow Obiang
- Oliver Dimsdale as Felix Quinn
- Kim Medcalf as Annie Harke
- Cush Jumbo as Hannah Fellows
- Tom Ellis as Ross Jarvis
- Rosie Day as Tess Elliot
- Philip Jackson as Mal Fielding
- Lucy Brown as Maya

== Broadcasts ==
Harley Street was shown on ITV at 9pm each Thursday. The first transmission on 17 July had an audience of 3.9m and an 18% audience share. It was also the first drama ITV has aired in high definition on ITV1 HD available to Freesat viewers. The final episode was shown on 21 August.

On 19 November 2008, ITV announced that the programme would not return due to poor figures.

== DVD release ==
Harley Street was released in the UK on 25 August 2008.
