= Carl Lerner =

American film editor, director and educator (1912–1973)

Carl Lerner (17 June 1912 – 26 August 1973) was an American film editor, director and educator whose career bridged New York's post‑war documentary movement and Hollywood's studio and independent features, earning recognition for his editorial work on 12 Angry Men (1957) and for directing the civil‑rights drama Black Like Me (1964).

== Early life and education ==
Lerner was born in Philadelphia, Pennsylvania, on 17 June 1912 to Russian‑Jewish immigrant parents. He earned a degree in theatre arts at Temple University in the early 1930s, where he also staged student productions. After acting with Philadelphia and New York repertory companies, he moved behind the scenes as a stage director before entering film in the late 1940s.

== Career ==
Lerner’s first credited feature was Cry Murder (1950) for Columbia Pictures, initiating a prolific decade that included the docu‑fiction On the Bowery (1956), which won the Grand Prize for Documentary at the Venice Film Festival and the 1957 BAFTA for Best Documentary. His taut cutting of Sidney Lumet’s courtroom drama 12 Angry Men (1957) has been widely cited for intensifying the film’s claustrophobic tension through an accelerating pattern of shot lengths. Despite critical success, Lerner’s progressive politics led to his gray‑listing during the Hollywood blacklist, making him one of the few East‑Coast editors named in the era’s anti‑Communist campaigns. Continuing freelance, he cut The Fugitive Kind (1959), Requiem for a Heavyweight (1962), The Swimmer (1968) and Alan J. Pakula’s thriller Klute (1971).

In 1964, Lerner made his solo directing debut with Black Like Me, adapting John Howard Griffin’s best‑seller into a stark account of segregation‑era racism. Alongside film work, he taught editing at New York University's Tisch School of the Arts, influencing a generation of editors, including Paul Barnes of Ken Burns’ Florentine Films.

Among Lerner's significant editing credits are the melodrama Cry Murder (1950), 12 Angry Men (1957), Middle of the Night (1959), The Fugitive Kind (1959), Requiem for a Heavyweight (1962), The Swimmer (1968) and Klute (1971); his directing credits include the short documentary American Homes (1949) and Black Like Me (1964).

== Personal life ==
Lerner married Austrian‑born writer, Gerda Lerner, in 1941; they had two children and often collaborated, with Gerda co‑writing Black Like Me. Diagnosed with a malignant brain tumour in 1972, he died in New York City on 26 August 1973, aged 61.
