= Gerda Lerner =

American historian and woman's history author (1920–2013)

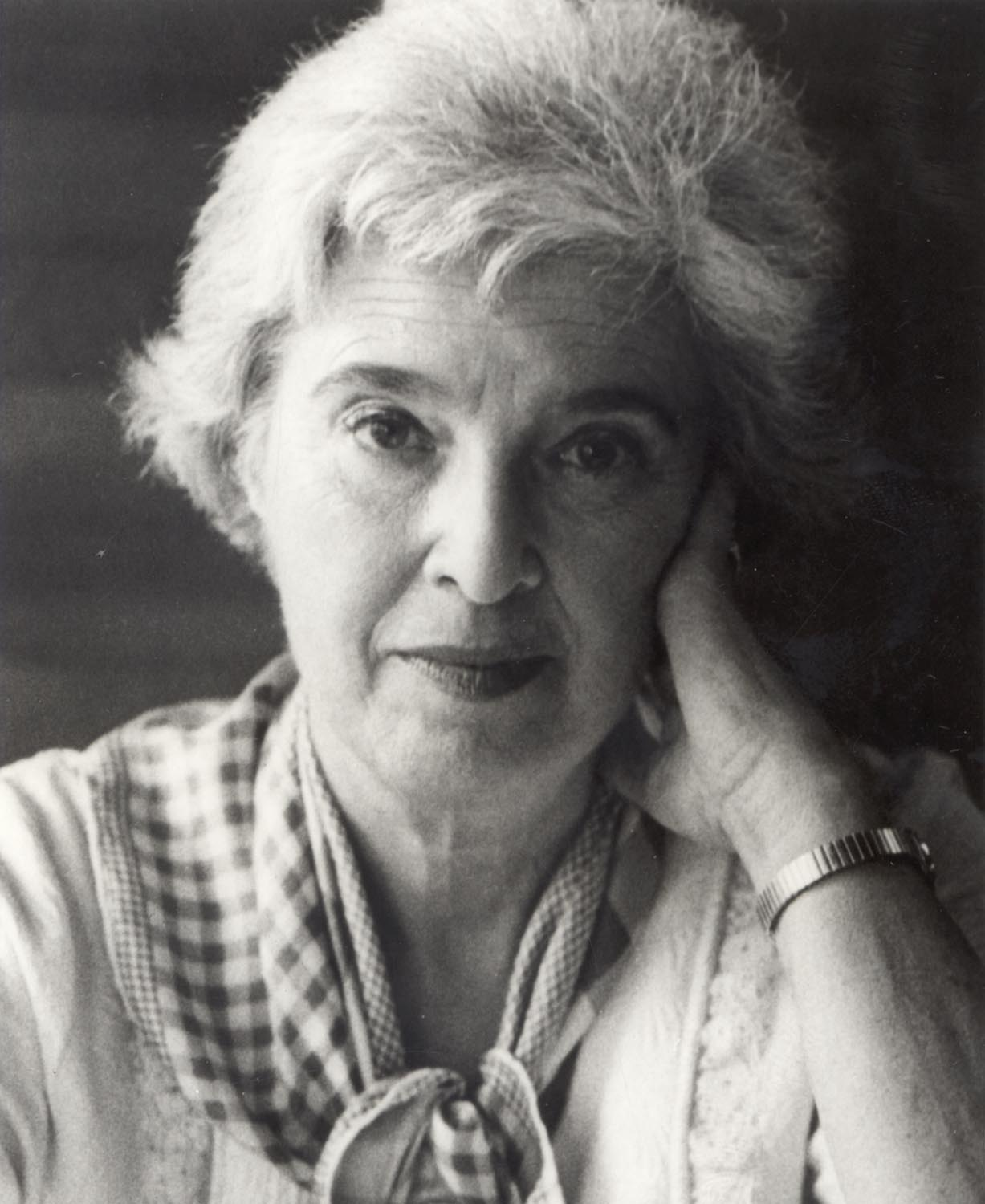
- Lerner in 1981
- Born: Gerda Hedwig Kronstein; April 30, 1920; Vienna, Austria
- Died: January 2, 2013 (aged 92); Madison, Wisconsin, U.S.
- Education: The New School (BA); Columbia University (MA, PhD)
- Occupations: Women's history scholar and author
- Employer(s): Long Island University; Sarah Lawrence College; University of Wisconsin–Madison; Duke University; Columbia University
- Organization(s): Organization of American Historians; Congress of American Women; National Organization for Women
- Notable work: Black Women in White America: A Documentary History (1972); The Creation of Patriarchy (1986); The Creation of Feminist Consciousness: From the Middle Ages to 1870 (1993); Fireweed: A Political Autobiography (2003)
- Political party: Communist Party USA
- Spouses: Bobby Jensen (m. 1939; div. 1940) Carl Lerner (m. 1941; died 1973)
- Children: 2

Gerda Hedwig Lerner (née Kronstein; April 30, 1920 – January 2, 2013) was an Austrian-born American historian and woman's history author. In addition to her numerous scholarly publications, she wrote poetry, fiction, theatre pieces, screenplays, and an autobiography. She served as president of the Organization of American Historians from 1980 to 1981. In 1980, she was appointed Robinson Edwards Professor of History at the University of Wisconsin-Madison, where she taught until retiring in 1991.

Lerner was one of the founders of the academic field of women's history, known as the "godmother of women's history." In 1963, while still an undergraduate at the New School for Social Research, she taught "Great Women in American History", which is considered to be the first regular college course on women's history offered anywhere.

She taught at Long Island University from 1965 to 1967. She played a key role in the development of women's history curricula and was involved in the development of degree programs in women's history at Sarah Lawrence College (where she taught from 1968 to 1979 and established the nation's first master's degree program in women's history) and at the University of Wisconsin-Madison, where she launched the first Ph.D. program in women's history. She also worked at Duke University and Columbia University, where she was a co-founder of the Seminar on Women.

== Early life ==
She was born Gerda Hedwig Kronstein in Vienna, Austria, on April 30, 1920, the first child of Ilona Kronstein (née Neumann) and Robert Kronstein, an affluent and secular Jewish couple. Her family originated from Breslau, Berlin, Léva (German: Lewenz, Levice), Turdossin (Turdos, German: Turdoschin, Tvrdošín) (Upper Hungary), Helishoy (German: Holleschau, Holešov) (Moravia), and Reichenberg (Liberec) (Bohemia). Her father was a pharmacist, and her mother an artist. According to her autobiography, Gerda had a strained relationship with her mother as a child. As an adult, Gerda believed that her mother struggled because she did not fit in the role of a Viennese wife and mother. Gerda had a younger sister called Nora, and they attended local schools and gymnasium together.

Following the 1938 Anschluss, Kronstein became involved with the anti-Nazi resistance. She and her mother were jailed that year after her father had escaped to Liechtenstein and Switzerland, where he stayed during the war. Gerda occupied a cell for six weeks with two Christian women held on political grounds. They shared their prison food with her because Jews received restricted rations. In 1939, her mother moved to France, and Lerner's sister relocated to Palestine. That year, Gerda emigrated to the United States under the sponsorship of the family of Bobby Jensen, her socialist fiancé.

== Career ==
Settling in New York, Kronstein married Jensen. She worked in a variety of jobs as a waitress, salesperson, office clerk, and X-ray technician, while also writing fiction and poetry. She published two short stories featuring first-person accounts of the Nazi annexation of Austria.

Her marriage with Jensen was failing when she met Carl Lerner (1912–1973), a married theater director who was a member of the Communist Party USA (CPUSA). They both established temporary residence in Nevada and obtained divorces in Reno; the state offered easier terms for divorce than did most others. Kronstein and Lerner married and moved to Hollywood, where Carl pursued a career in film-making and she contributed short stories to the left-wing California literary journal The Clipper.

In 1946, Lerner helped found the Los Angeles chapter of the Congress of American Women, a Communist front organization. The Lerners engaged in CPUSA activities involving trade unionism, civil rights, and anti-militarism. They suffered under the rise of McCarthyism in the 1950s, especially the Hollywood blacklist, and left the CPUSA.

The Lerners returned to New York. In 1951, Lerner collaborated with poet Eve Merriam on a musical, The Singing of Women. Lerner's novel No Farewell was published in 1955. She enrolled at the New School for Social Research, where she received a bachelor's degree in 1963. She wrote in her autobiography that her frequent status made her think about "people who did not have a voice in telling their own stories. Lerner's insights eventually influenced her decision to earn a Ph.D. in history and then to help establish women's history as a standard academic discipline." In 1963, she offered the first regular college course in women's history, which at the time had no status as a field of study in academia.

In the early 1960s, Lerner and her husband co-authored the screenplay of the film Black Like Me (1964), based on the book by white journalist John Howard Griffin, who had reported on six weeks of travel in small towns and cities of the Deep South passing as a black man. Carl Lerner directed the film, starring James Whitmore.

Lerner continued with graduate studies at Columbia University, where she earned both an M.A. (1965) and a Ph.D. (1966). Her doctoral dissertation was published as The Grimke Sisters from South Carolina: Rebels Against Slavery (1967), a study of Sarah Moore Grimké and Angelina Grimké, sisters from a slaveholding family who became abolitionists in the North. Learning that their late brother had mixed-race sons, they helped pay to educate the boys.

In 1966, Lerner became a founding member of the National Organization for Women (NOW), and she served as a local and national leader for a short period. In 1968, she received her first academic appointment at Sarah Lawrence College. There Lerner developed a Master of Arts Program in Women's History, which Sarah Lawrence offered beginning in 1972; it was the first American graduate degree in the field. Lerner also taught at Long Island University in Brooklyn.

In the 1960s and 1970s, Lerner published scholarly books and articles that helped establish women's history as a recognized field of study. Her 1969 article "The Lady and the Mill Girl: Changes in the Status of Women in the Age of Jackson", published in the academic journal American Studies, was an early and influential example of class analysis in women's history. She was among the first to bring a consciously feminist lens to the study of history.

Among her most important works are the documentary anthologies Black Women in White America (1972) and The Female Experience (1976), which she edited, along with her essay collection, The Majority Finds Its Past (1979).

In 1979, Lerner chaired The Women's History Institute, a fifteen-day conference (July 13–29) at Sarah Lawrence College, co-sponsored by the college, the Women's Action Alliance (WAA), and the Smithsonian Institution. It was attended by leaders of national organizations for women and girls. When the Institute participants learned about the success of the Women's History Week celebrated in Sonoma County, California, they decided to initiate similar commemorations within their own organizations, communities, and school districts. They also agreed to support an effort to secure a "National Women's History Week". This helped lead to the national establishment of Women's History Month.

In 1980, Lerner moved to the University of Wisconsin at Madison, where she established the nation's first Ph.D. program in women's history. At this institution, she wrote The Creation of Patriarchy (1986), The Creation of Feminist Consciousness (1993), parts one and two of Women and History; Why History Matters (1997), and Fireweed: A Political Autobiography (2002).

From 1981 to 1982, Lerner served as president of the Organization of American Historians. As an educational director for the organization, she helped make women's history accessible to leaders of women's organizations and high school teachers.

== Selected works ==
=== Black Women in White America ===
Lerner edited Black Women in White America: A Documentary History (1972), which chronicles 350 years of black women's contributions to history, despite centuries of being enslaved and treated as property. It was one of the first books to detail the contributions of black women in history.

=== The Creation of Patriarchy ===
In The Creation of Patriarchy (1986), volume one of Women and History, Lerner ventured into prehistory, attempting to trace the roots of patriarchal dominance. She concluded that patriarchy was part of archaic states forming in the 2nd millennium BCE. Lerner provides historical, archeological, literary, and artistic evidence for the idea that patriarchy is a cultural construct. She believed that the main strength of patriarchy was ideological and that in western societies it "severed the connection between women and the Divine," replacing priestesses and powerful goddesses by a "male religious bureaucracy and an all-powerful male divinity."

=== The Creation of Feminist Consciousness ===
The Creation of Feminist Consciousness: From the Middle Ages to 1870 (1993) is her second volume of Women and History. In this book, she reviews European culture from the seventh century through the nineteenth centuries, showing the limitations imposed by a male-dominated culture. After the seventh century, more of women's writings began to survive, and Lerner uses these to show the development of what she defines as feminist thought. She demonstrates the numerous ways that women "have bypassed or redefined or undermined 'male thought'". She examines in detail the educational deprivation of women, their isolation from many of the traditions of their societies, and the expressive outlet many women have found through writing. Often beginning in religious or prophetic writing, this was a way for women to engage in what Lerner calls "ideological production", including defining alternative futures and "think themselves out of patriarchy".

=== Fireweed: A Political Autobiography ===
Fireweed: A Political Autobiography (2003) is a detailed account of Lerner's life from her childhood in Vienna through war and emigration, to 1958. That year, she began her formal studies at the New School for Social Research in New York, an institution established by numerous European refugees from the Nazi persecution. She believed that education and life work were critical to women's self-realization and happiness.

== Legacy and honors ==
- In 1998, Lerner was elected a Fellow of the American Academy of Arts and Sciences.
- In 1986, Lerner won the American Historical Association's Joan Kelly Prize for her book The Creation of Patriarchy, on the roots of women's oppression.
- She received the Bruce Catton Prize for Lifetime Achievement in Historical Writing from the Society of American Historians, and the Berkshire Conference of Women Historians Special Book Award.
- In 1992, the Organization of American Historians (OAH) established the annual Lerner-Scott Prize, named for her and Anne Firor Scott. It is awarded annually to the writer of the best doctoral dissertation that year in U.S. women's history.
- Lerner is the subject of a full-length documentary film, Why Women Need to Climb Mountains (2016), by Renata Keller.
- In 2008, Lerner was awarded an Honorary Doctor of Letters by Harvard University

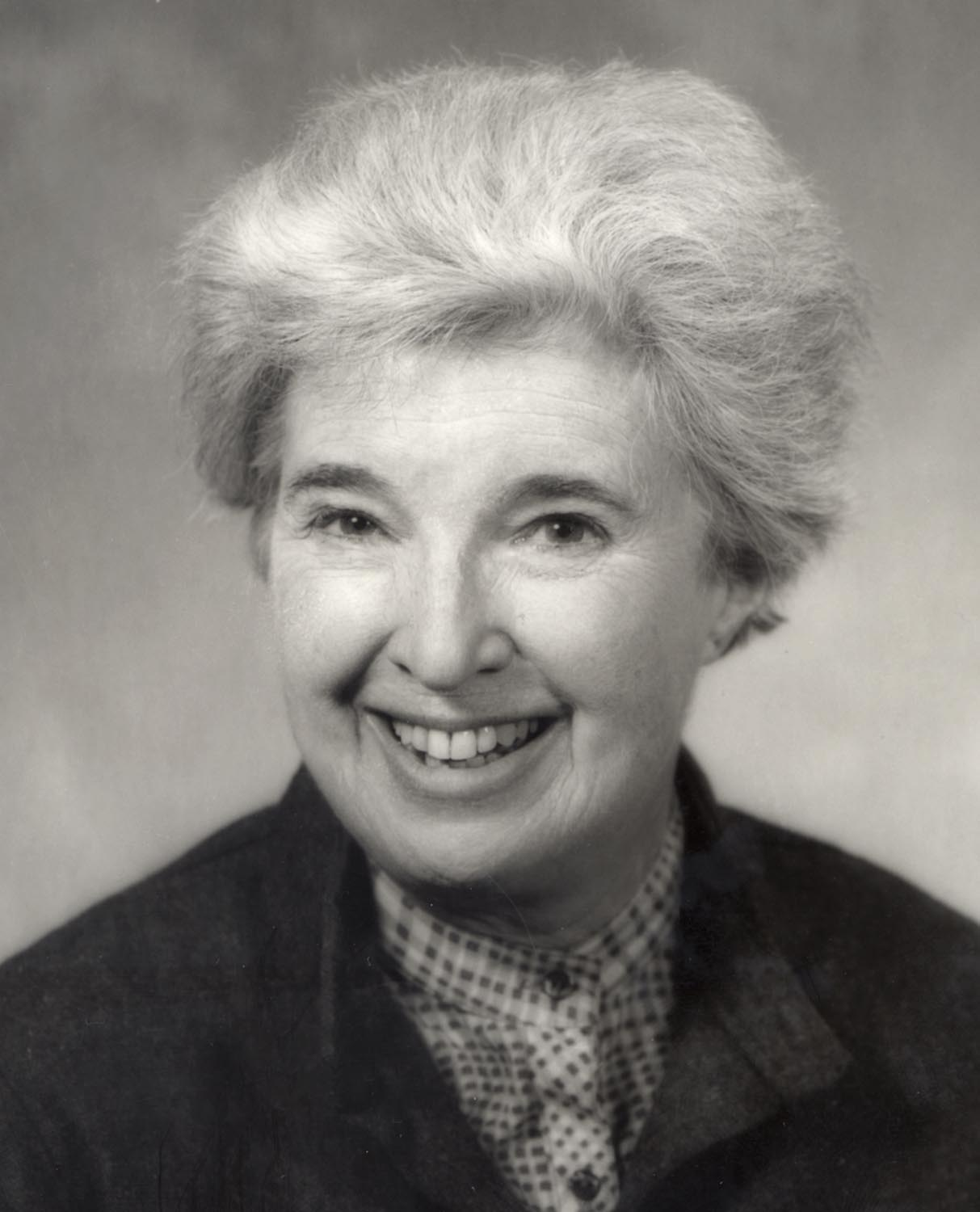
Gerda Lerner c. 1984

== Death ==
Lerner died on January 2, 2013, in Madison, Wisconsin, at the age of 92. She was survived by her grown children Dan and Stephanie Lerner. A memorial symposium in Lerner's honour was held at the Radcliffe Institute and a three-hour program was held at the University of Wisconsin-Madison.

== Other works ==
=== Musical ===
- Singing of Women (1951, with Eve Merriam)

=== Screenplays ===
- Prayer Pilgrimage for Freedom (1957)
- Black Like Me (1964)
- Home for Easter (n.d.)

=== Books ===
- No Farewell (1955), an autobiographical novel; originally in German under the pseudonym Margaret Rainer: Es git keinen Abschied (1953)
- The Grimké Sisters from South Carolina: Rebels against Authority (1967)
- The Woman in American History [ed.] (1971)
- Black Women in White America: A Documentary History (1972)
- The Female Experience: An American Documentary (1976)
- A Death of One's Own (1978/2006)
- The Majority Finds Its Past: Placing Women in History (1979)
- Teaching Women's History (1981)
- Women's Diaries of the Westward Journey (1982)
- The Creation of Patriarchy (1986)
- The Creation of Feminist Consciousness: From the Middle Ages to Eighteen-Seventy (1994)
- Scholarship in Women's History Rediscovered & New (1994)
- Why History Matters: Life and Thought (1997)
- Fireweed: A Political Autobiography (Temple University Press, 2003)
- Living with History/Making Social Change (2009)

== Biographies ==
- Ransby, Barbabra. 2002. "A Historian Who Takes Sides", The Progressive, September.
- Lerner, Gerda. 2005. "Life of Learning", Charles Homer Haskins Lecture for 2005.
- MacLean, Nancy. 2002. "Rethinking the Second Wave", The Nation, October 14.
- Gordon, Linda; Kerber, Linda K.; Kessler-Harris, Alice. 2013. "Gerda Lerner (1920–2013). Pioneering Historian and Feminist", Clio. Women, Gender, History.
- Keller, Renata. 2015. "Why Women Need to Climb Mountains – on a journey through the life and vision of Dr. Gerda Lerner"
