= To Be Fat like Me =

2007 American TV film

- DVD cover
- Genre: Drama
- Written by: Michelle Lovretta
- Directed by: Douglas Barr
- Starring: Kaley Cuoco; Melissa Halstrom; Michael Phenicie; Rachel Cairns; Adrienne Carter; Carlo Marks; Brandon Olds; Scott Little; Caroline Rhea
- Music by: Hal Beckett
- Country of origin: United States
- Original language: English

Production
- Executive producers: Mike Jacobs Jr.; Michael Givens; Allan Krasnick
- Producers: Paul Rayman; Michael Shepard
- Cinematography: Peter Benison
- Editor: Nicole Ratcliffe
- Running time: 98 minutes
- Production company: Ardmore Productions

Original release
- Network: Lifetime
- Release: January 8, 2007

To Be Fat like Me is a 2007 American drama television film directed by Douglas Barr and starring Kaley Cuoco. It premiered on Lifetime on January 8, 2007.

== Plot ==
Aly, who is beautiful, popular, and athletic, has been relying on a softball scholarship as her path to college. She leads an active lifestyle and is always on the go. Given her mother's history of weight issues and lifelong struggle with depression, Aly has made it her mission to maintain her health and fitness. However, when an opposing player accidentally steps on her knee during a game, causing an injury that jeopardizes her scholarship prospects, she faces the reality that she may need to explore alternative means to finance her education.

It is revealed that as a consequence of binge eating, her mother got sick and had to use the money set aside in her daughter's college fund to pay for treatment, a decision for which Aly has always resented her. Aly also showers scorn on her family for their high-fat diet and lack of exercise, to the point of refusing to eat a cake that her mother purchased just for her.

To get the money, Aly decides to enter a documentary contest with a large cash prize. Convinced that her overweight younger brother and mother use their struggles with weight as an excuse for everything wrong in their lives, Aly decides to go undercover, using a fat suit and facial prosthetics to make herself obese and unattractive, while deploying a hidden camera to record herself at school to prove personality can outshine physical appearance.

Aly soon realizes how difficult the life can be for the overweight, as she is shunned and mistreated by other students, despite her resolve to be kind and maintain the same personality she always had. She meets Ramona, an overweight girl in the same class who shares aspects of her personal life with Aly but feels betrayed when she discovers Aly's real identity and that their conversations have been secretly recorded for the documentary. Aly titles her documentary Fat Like Me, a reference to John Howard Griffin's 1961 book Black Like Me, which recounts Griffin's experience living as an African American in the segregated Southern United States for several weeks after receiving skin-darkening injections.

The film ends with Aly deciding to attend a house party while disguised, just to see how the same "friends" who loved her when she was attractive will still feel the same way now that she's fat. She is shocked to realize that, just as she expected, they now look down on her and talk behind her back just because of how she looks. Aly storms out, though not before unmasking herself in front of everyone so they know the truth. Aly reconciles with her mother and tells Ramona she intends to drop out of the contest. However, Ramona talks her out of it, saying that if she truly wants to make up for her deception, she will win. She also tells Aly that one day, they might actually get a chance to be real friends.

== Cast ==
- Kaley Cuoco as Alyson
- Caroline Rhea as Madelyn
- Ben Cotton as Warren
- David Lewis as Mr. Johnson
- Rachel Cairns as Jamie
- Michael Phenicie as Jim
- Brandon Olds as Adam
- Timothy Paul Perez as Coach Martin
- Carlo Marks as Michael
- Melissa Halstrom as Ramona
- Scott Little as George
- Matt Bellefleur as Eddie
- Richard Harmon as Kyle
- Adrienne Carter as Kendall
