= The Creation of Patriarchy =

1986 book by Gerda Lerner

- Cover of the first edition
- Author: Gerda Lerner
- Language: English
- Series: Women and History
- Publication date: 1986
- Publication place: United States
- Media type: Print
- Followed by: The Creation of Feminist Consciousness

The Creation of Patriarchy is a non-fiction book written by Gerda Lerner in 1986 as an explanation for the origins of misogyny in ancient Mesopotamia and the following Western societies. She traces the "images, metaphors, [and] myths" that lead to patriarchal concepts' existence in Western society (Lerner 10). She believes that the creation of patriarchy in the ancient Near East was a 2500-year period from nearly 3100 BC to 600 BC rather than a single event (Lerner 8).

In the text, Lerner argues that women have historically played a large role in the systemic subjugation of women, whether for self-preservation, to receive the benefits of class and more modernly "race", or for other reasons. She claims that it is likely that women accepted sex-segregated tasks in their societies long before it led to sex-based oppression.

Lerner also argues that the widespread existence of misogyny in societies is not due to biological or psychological differences between males and females, but rather that it has historical explanations. She states that since patriarchy "has a beginning in history", it "can be ended by historical process" (Lerner 6).

== Contents ==
The book contains eleven chapters, the majority named after a metaphor for gender (Lerner 10). Each chapter traces a different aspect of "the development of the leading ideas, symbols, and metaphors by which patriarchal gender relations were incorporated into Western civilization (Lerner 10).

1. "Introduction"
2. "Origins" argues that the formation of private property and class society occurred after the appropriation of women's sexual and reproductive capacities.
3. "A Working Hypothesis" claims that archaic states had a great interest in maintaining a patriarchal family structure because they were organized from it.
4. "The Stand-in Wife and the Pawn" states that men learned to subjugate other groups from practicing dominance over women, and that this was expressed through slavery, beginning with the enslavement of women from conquered groups.
5. "The Woman Slave" asserts that according to many different ancient legal codes, states enforced women's sexual subordination through force, economic dependency, class privileges, and the artificial division between "respectable" and "non-respectable" women.
6. "The Wife and the Concubine" argues that class differences exist for men based on their relation to the means of production while for women they are based on their sexual ties to men who grant them material resources. This chapter also claims that laws defined "respectable" women as attached to one man and "non respectable" women as those unattached to a single or any men, and that these laws were institutionalized through the veiling of women.
7. "Veiling the Woman" explains that long after women had become subordinated to men in most aspects of their lives, metaphysical female power, especially birthing, was still worshiped by women and men in the form of powerful goddesses and that women played respected roles as mediators between humans and gods. This chapter also describes the historical procession from first, the invention of Near East kingship; to second, the replacement of goddesses with a dominant male god figure; to third, the understanding of fertility control as being conceptualized as a goddess' undertaking to the "symbolic of actual mating of the male god or God-King with the Goddess or her priestess" (Lerner 9); to fourth, the split between eroticism/sexuality and pro-creativity as expressed by the creation of desperate goddesses for both functions; to finally, the transformation of the Mother-Goddess into "the wife/consort of the chief male God" (Lerner 9).
8. "The Goddess" claims that early Hebrew monotheism was expressed as an attack on different cults of various fertility goddesses. It asserts that the Book of Genesis and its writing ascribes creativity and pro-creativity to an all-powerful God with titles of "Lord" and "King", establishing him as male. It also discusses the foundations of the association of female sexuality dissociated from procreation with sin and evil.
9. "The Patriarchs" explains the establishment of a covenant community that both symbolizes and actually contracts an assumed, inherent subordination of women in the relationship between the monotheistic god and humanity. It argues that through this, women are excluded from the metaphysical covenant and the earthly covenant community, leading them to solely access God and the holy community as mothers.
10. "The Covenant" argues that this symbolic devaluation of women in relation to the divine becomes one of the metaphors that founds Western society, along with the assumption that women are incomplete and damaged human beings of a different and lower order than men, as described by Aristotle.
11. "Symbols"
12. "The Creation of Patriarchy"

== Reception ==
The book has been read and taught for many gender and women's studies courses along with other fields. The arguments presented in this book have been called "provocative" and "suggestive" by anthropologist Deborah Gewertz. One reviewer described it as "a fascinating and well-informed book". A different critic, journalist Nancy Barnes, stated: "The book is a tremendous achievement, which will serve us all in useful and provocative ways." Still another critic, Elizabeth Fox-Genovese, critiqued the book as insufficient in explaining the development of Western patriarchy.

Catharine R. Stimpson of Rutgers University described the book as having "the boldness, authority, and richness of The Second Sex."

The book won the 1986 Joan Kelly Prize of the American Historical Association.
