= Roger Craig =

Roger Craig may refer to:

- Roger Craig (American football) (born 1960), American football player
- Roger Craig (baseball) (1930–2023), American baseball player, coach, and manager
- Roger Craig (Jeopardy! contestant) (born 1976/1977), former Jeopardy! contestant
- Roger D. Craig (1936–1975), deputy sheriff of Dallas, Texas
- Roger Scott Craig, Northern Irish musician

== See also ==
- Roger Craig Smith (born 1975), American voice actor
