= Sepia (magazine) =

Photojournalistic magazine

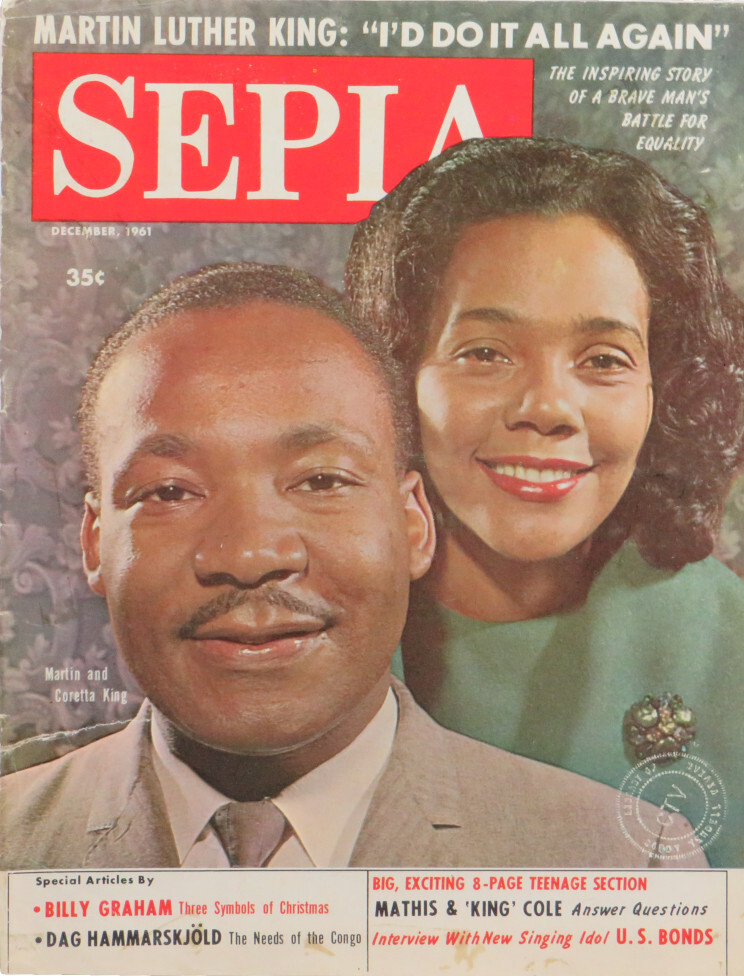
- Issue cover dated December 1961, featuring Dr. Martin Luther King Jr. and Coretta Scott King
- Editorial director: Adelle Jackson
- Categories: Photojournalistic magazine
- Publisher: George Levitan
- Total circulation: 160,000 (1983)
- Founded: 1946
- Final issue: 1983
- Company: Good Publishing Company
- Country: United States
- Based in: Fort Worth, Texas
- Language: English
- ISSN: 0037-2374
- OCLC: 1765397

Sepia was a photojournalistic magazine featuring articles based primarily on achievements of African Americans. The magazine was founded in 1946 as Negro Achievements by Horace J. Blackwell, an African-American clothing merchant of Fort Worth, Texas. He had already founded The World's Messenger in 1942. However, despite appealing to African American audiences, Sepia was acknowledged to have become a white-owned magazine by 1950, with Blackwell also dying in 1948.

George Levitan, a Jewish American plumbing merchant in Fort Worth, bought Blackwell's magazines and Good Publishing Company (aka Sepia Publishing) in 1950. He changed the magazine's name gradually; in 1954 he named it Sepia and published it until his death in 1976. He changed the name of Messenger to Bronze Thrills and had success with that for some time as well, also publishing black-audience magazines Hep and Jive.

After Levitan's death, Sepia was bought by Beatrice Pringle, who had been part of Blackwell's founding editorial team. She continued it until 1983, closing it despite respectable circulation. It was always overshadowed by Ebony, founded and published in Chicago.

== History ==
In the postwar environment, when the South was still legally segregated, the publishing history of Sepia, based in Fort Worth, Texas, reflects other changes. It was founded as Negro Achievements by Horace J. Blackwell, an African-American clothing merchant. His editorial team relied on director Adelle Martin Jackson, who had advanced from starting as a stenographer, and Beatrice Pringle. This was the beginning of the magazine's tradition of having women in "important editorial positions."

Blackwell had already started the True Confessions-type magazine The World's Messenger in 1942. His innovation was to feature stories written in the dialect of Southern working-class African Americans, providing them with a familiar style.

After Blackwell's death, his magazines and Good Publishing Company were bought by George Levitan, a Jewish-American plumbing merchant born in Michigan. He also published other titles for the black market. After his death in 1976, Sepia was bought by Beatrice Pringle, returning it to black ownership but under a woman publisher. All three publishers were outside the majority white Anglo-Saxon males who occupied positions comparable positions with mainstream magazines. But they developed a magazine to appeal to the African-American market, which was receiving new attention in the postwar period, and had considerable success for decades, building distribution to a national audience. While Sepia did not equal the newsstand sales of Levitan's true confessions-type magazine The World's Messenger (renamed as Bronze Thrills), it was the most successful magazine to compete with Ebony for nearly four decades, building a base of national advertisers.

Levitan made changes gradually to Negro Achievements, keeping its name until 1953, when he changed it to Sepia Record. In 1954 he changed it again to simply Sepia.

== Major Elvis Presley controversy ==
In April 1957, Sepia published a controversial article titled "How Negroes Feel About Elvis," which accused singer Elvis Presley, whose popularity was at the time growing in the African American community, of actually being racist. The article even alleged that Elvis claimed "The only thing Negroes can do for me is buy my records and shine my shoes."

According to African-American author Joyce Rochelle Vaughn, in the preface of her book "Thirty Pieces of Silver: The Betrayal of Elvis Presley", an aunt who raised her had told her to never listen to Elvis Presley's music because "Sepia" magazine had run an article in early 1957 in which he was quoted saying that the “only thing Negroes can do for me is buy my records and shine my shoes.” She then decided, forty years later, to undertake a full study and complete unmasking of falsely reported news surrounding his life and career.

According to Ms. Vaughn, the truth about the invented slur lay in white Americans making money exploiting statements and falsifying others, because so many whites during the era openly made racist remarks against black people. As such, when black radio stations started to play Elvis’ music and his popularity grew in the black community, the slur was invented.

Jet sent its most prestigious writer, the late Louis Robinson, to the set of "Jailhouse Rock" to raise the matter with the then 22-year-old Presley. After additionally interviewing African-American musicians like B.B. King, who knew Presley since his teen years, Robinson cleared him of all charges. Even so, the damage was done and the slur continuing to be utilized as late as the second decade of the 21st century.

== Editorial changes ==
Adelle Jackson continued as editorial director of Sepia under Levitan, and Beatrice Pringle also continued with the magazine. Sepia focused on various aspects of African American culture, including prominent leaders of churches, civil rights, popular music, and education. With the goal of fostering leadership, it published serious articles on the development of black institutions, including colleges and universities.

The magazine often exposed issues such as lynching and Ku Klux Klan operations in the South in its earlier edition; after some of the successes of the civil rights movement had been achieved, it covered the rise in inner-city violence among blacks.

Levitan financed John Howard Griffin's investigative journalism for his book Black Like Me (1961), first serialized in Sepia under the title Journey into Shame. In Black Like Me, Griffin described Levitan and the way he managed Sepia:

A large, middle-aged man, he long ago won my admiration by offering equal job opportunities to members of any race, choosing according to their qualifications and future potentialities. With an on-the-job training program, he has made Sepia a model, edited, printed and distributed from the million-dollar Fort Worth plant.

In his 2015 history of the city of Fort Worth, Richard Selcer says that Levitan missed covering the civil rights movement more deeply, and the NAACP was active in the city in the 1960s. He thought that might have contributed to the fall-off in readership in this period.

== 1976–1983 ==
After Levitan's death in October 1976, Beatrice Pringle, one of the original publisher-editor team with Blackwell, bought Sepia and continued operations through 1982. Sepia still had a circulation of approximately 160,000 in 1983, when she closed the business. Scholars have had a difficult time researching the magazine, as its records and building were mostly destroyed after it closed.

== Photo archive ==
The African American Museum in Dallas, Texas, now holds the picture files of Sepia in its archives. The Rock and Roll Hall of Fame held an exhibition: The Sepia Magazine Photo Archive - 1948-1983: 35 Years of the African-American Experience in Music, January 19, 2009 – April 12, 2009.

The Sepia exhibition displayed more than 40 images originally published in the magazine, some of which had not been seen since their original printing. They included many African-American musical figures, including James Brown, Ruth Brown, Ray Charles, Mahalia Jackson, Bob Marley, Jackie Wilson, Erroll Garner and Dizzy Gillespie. Howard Kramer, curatorial director of the Rock and Roll Hall of Fame and Museum, commented, “Sepia magazine was a vital voice in the African-American community for many decades. The knowledge and information it presented spoke much about its audience, and its audience cared about and loved music.”

== Notable contributors ==
- Lucille Elizabeth Bishop Smith (1892–1985), African American entrepreneur, chef, and inventor of the first hot biscuit mix, and magazine's first food editor.

== Sources ==
- Daniel, Walter C. (1982). Black Journals of the United States. Westport: Greenwood Press. ISBN 0-313-20704-6.
