= Maxwell Geismar =

American writer (1909–1979)

- Born: August 1, 1909; New York, New York, U.S.
- Died: July 24, 1979 (aged 69); Harrison, New York
- Education: Columbia University; Harvard University
- Writing career
- Genres: literary criticism and biography
- Notable work: Biography of Mark Twain
- Notable awards: Guggenheim Fellowship (1942)

Maxwell David Geismar (August 1, 1909 – July 1979) was an American writer, literary critic and biographer of Mark Twain.

Geismar wrote the introduction to Forgive My Grief: Volume II by Penn Jones Jr., which critiqued the Warren Commission. He also penned the introduction to Eldridge Cleaver's Soul on Ice (1968). A teacher at Sarah Lawrence College for many years, he signed "The Triple Revolution", sent to President Lyndon Johnson in 1964.

== Writings ==
- Preface to Jones Jr., Penn (1967). Forgive My Grief: Volume II.
- Introduction to Cleaver, Eldridge (1968). Soul on Ice. A Delta Book.
