= Cry Murder =

1950 American crime film

- Theatrical release poster
- Directed by: Jack Glenn
- Screenplay by: James Carhardt; Nicholas Winter
- Based on: Lost and Found by A. B. Shiffrin
- Produced by: Edward Leven
- Starring: Carole Mathews; Jack Lord; Howard Smith; Hope Miller; Tom Pedi; Eugene Smith
- Cinematography: Don Malkames
- Edited by: Carl Lerner
- Production company: Edward Leven Productions
- Distributed by: Film Classics
- Release date: February 10, 1950
- Running time: 63 minutes
- Country: United States
- Language: English

Cry Murder is a 1950 American crime film directed by Jack Glenn and written by James Carhardt and Nicholas Winter. The film stars Carole Mathews, Jack Lord, Howard Smith, Hope Miller, Tom Pedi and Eugene Smith. It was released as a second feature on February 10, 1950 by Film Classics.

== Cast ==
- Carole Mathews as Norma Wayne Alden
- Jack Lord as Tommy Warren
- Howard Smith as Senator Alden
- Hope Miller as Rosa Santorre
- Tom Pedi as Santorre
- Eugene Smith as Michael Alden
- Harry Clark as Joe
- Tom Ahearne as Phillips
- William Gibberson as Blair
- William Dwyer as Patrolman
- Lionel MacLyn as Sergeant
