= Ray Sprigle =

American journalist (1886–1957)

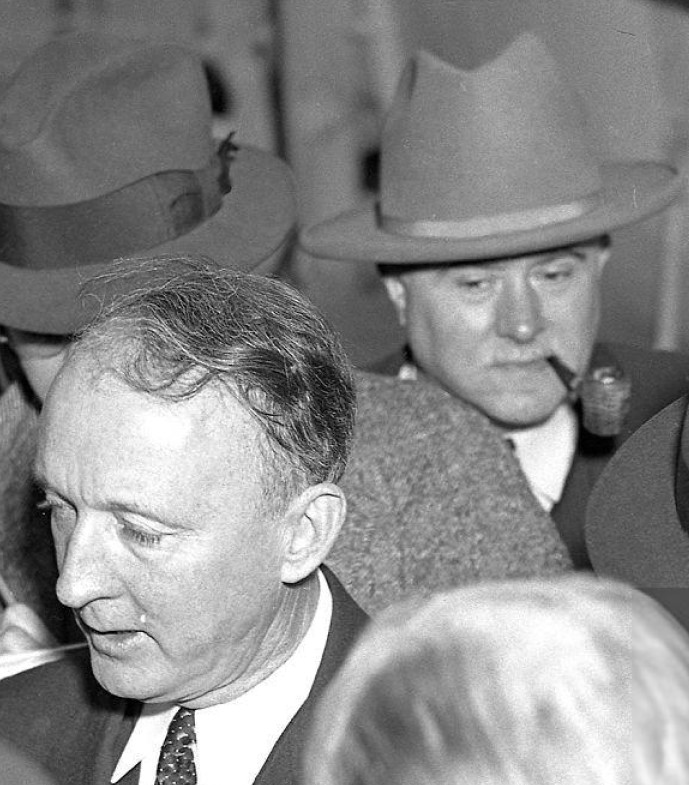
Sprigle (top right) and Hugo Black in 1937

Ray Sprigle (August 14, 1886 – December 22, 1957) was a journalist for the Pittsburgh Post-Gazette. He won a Pulitzer Prize in 1938 for his reporting that Alabama Senator Hugo Black, newly appointed to the US Supreme Court, had been a member of the 20th-century Ku Klux Klan.

Sprigle's account of traveling in 1948 for a month in the Deep South while passing for black was first serialized by the Pittsburgh Post-Gazette in August 1948. The series was adapted as a book, In the Land of Jim Crow (1949).

== Early life and education ==
Sprigle was born in Akron, Ohio, to parents of colonial German (Pennsylvania Dutch) ancestry. He attended local schools. He left Ohio State University after his freshman year and started working as a newspaper reporter and a freelance pulp fiction writer.

== Career ==
Sprigle had a long and notable career in newspaper journalism, mostly as a general reporter with the Pittsburgh Post-Gazette.

In 1938 he was awarded the Pulitzer Prize for Reporting for a series of articles in the Post-Gazette proving that Hugo Black, newly appointed as a justice to the United States Supreme Court by President Franklin Roosevelt, had been a member of the Ku Klux Klan in Alabama. The evidence that Sprigle uncovered included, among other things, a photostatic copy of a letter from Black written on the stationery of the Alabama Klan asking to resign from the organization.

In May 1948, Sprigle, at age 61 and using the name "James Crawford," began a thirty-day, four-thousand-mile undercover mission through the Deep South. Passing as a black man, he was supported by the NAACP and accompanied by John Wesley Dobbs, a prominent 66-year-old political leader and early civil rights activist from Atlanta. Dobbs, who was known and respected across the South, took Sprigle into many black communities and introduced him as an NAACP field investigator to people he otherwise would never have been able to meet or interview.

When Sprigle returned to Pittsburgh he wrote 21 powerful and passionate first-person articles that exposed white readers to the oppression, discrimination and humiliation that 10 million black Americans were being subjected to every day by the South's system of legal segregation. The series, featured on the front page of the Pittsburgh Post-Gazette under the title "I Was a Negro in the South for 30 Days", reported on a range of social, political and economic issues, including the inferiority of segregated black public schools. According to the paper's publisher, the Post-Gazette had never run a series that received more attention.

Sprigle's series was nationally syndicated and carried by about 15 other newspapers, including the New York Herald Tribune, The Philadelphia Inquirer, and the Pittsburgh Courier, the country's largest African American-owned newspaper, which had editions in more than a dozen cities and was widely read by blacks in the South.

Sprigle's undercover journalism preceded by more than a decade novelist John Howard Griffin's similar but much more famous effort to learn what daily life was like for a Southern black man. Griffin, who dyed his skin black, turned his experiences into the 1961 bestseller Black Like Me.

== Works ==
- Ray Sprigle (1949). In the Land of Jim Crow. New York: Simon & Schuster.
