= Costaki Economopoulos =

American stand-up comedian

Costaki Economopoulous
- Born: Constantinos Christos Vassilis Economopoulos; December 25, 1969 (age 56); Fort Lauderdale, Florida, U.S.
- Other name: "The Biggest Name in Comedy"
- Notable work: The Bob & Tom Show regular
- Spouse: Christa Meola (m. 2013)
- Partner: Caroline Rhea (2007–2010)
- Children: 2

Comedy career
- Medium: Political satire
- Website: www.costaki.com

Constantinos Christos Vassilis "Costaki" Economopoulos (born December 25, 1969) is an American stand-up comedian. Born in Florida, he grew up in Kennesaw, Georgia. He began his comedy career in 1993 while attending graduate school at the University of Georgia. Economopoulos covers several topics in his act, but focuses mainly on political comedy. He is a regular guest on The Bob & Tom Show, most notably with his former weekly broadcasts of a spot dubbed "The Economonologue". As of 2018 he now does a segment for the show called "Quick Snaps," where he recaps the previous weekend's NFL highlights. He has been billed as "the biggest name in comedy" in reference to his long name.

== Notable works ==
C'Mon Its Jokes is a CD of Costaki Economopoulos's stand-up routine.

He also performs a weekly segment parodying the National Football League called Quick Snaps on Randy Baumann and the DVE Morning Show. It airs on WDVE, 102.5 FM in Pittsburgh.

== Personal life ==
Costaki Economopoulos and his former partner, comedian Caroline Rhea, have a daughter, Ava Rhea Economopoulos, born October 21, 2008. His current partner is photographer and teacher Christa Meola. They married in December 2013 and welcomed a daughter in 2018.
