= Ilona Kronstein =

Hungarian artist (1897-1948)

- Born: 1897; Budapest
- Died: 1948 (aged 50–51)

Ilona (Ili) Kronstein (née Neumann, 1897–1948) was a Jewish, Budapest-born artist. Although Kronstein was originally a graphic artist by trade, her artistic style evolved over her lifetime. Her works were newly discovered in the late 1990s and were later exhibited at the Jewish Museum in Vienna, Austria.

== Early life ==
Ili was born in 1897 to Sigmund (Zsiga) Neumann and Emma Deutsch in Budapest, Austria-Hungary. Her younger sisters were born in 1899 (Margit (Manci)) and in 1903 (Klara (Klari)). Around 1908, Sigmund's textile mill went out of business and he emigrated to Trieste, Italy with his family. There, Ili became proficient in Italian and developed an appreciation for Italy and its inhabitants. She showed artistic skill during childhood, but her work was discouraged by Sigmund. The family returned to Budapest, and Ili was removed from school when she was 16, as she needed to concentrate on getting ready for marriage and the middle-class lifestyle that accompanied it. During this period of her life, she volunteered for several years in nursery schools for poor children.

== Later life and artistic influences ==
Ili married Robert Kronstein in 1919, despite initial disapproval from Sigmund and Emma. She moved with Robert to Vienna, Austria-Hungary and he purchased a pharmacy there. In 1920, the couple had their first daughter, Gerda, and in 1925 their second daughter, Nora (named after Nora Helmer from Henrik Ibsen's A Doll's House). Ili and Robert's marriage was tense and contradictory. Much of the riffs in the marriage stemmed from Ili's longing to branch out and meet fascinating and enlightened people. The couple moved to a larger apartment during her first pregnancy. Ili's mother-in-law lived with them, and she disapproved of Ili's artistic and nonconformist attitudes. Following the birth of Nora, both Ili and Robert agreed to live together in the same home as friends (not husband and wife), and "he continued to support her throughout their lives."

Kronstein was then free to evolve artistically while being financially secure. She experimented with defining herself both as a person and as an artist for many years. She became a book binder and, after this, a German (her second language) writer. Kronstein started to diligently develop her artistry in the early 1930s, first as a graphic artist. Initially, Kronstein was significantly influenced by Egon Schiele's work, but later she was influenced by the artist-teacher Johannes Itten. She learned from Itten either at his School of Living and Art in Berlin, Germany or over the duration of one of his frequent visits to Vienna. Over the course of 1934 to 1936, Kronstein informally taught Gerda art lessons which mirrored Itten's methodology and viewpoints. Later, Itten's philosophies guided Kronstein's work; the counsel she provided for Nora (she went on to become an artist); and the description (in print) of a painting class that she had planned, which encompasses "practice exercises" and philosophical ideology (for instance, the relationship among breathing exercises, yoga, and art).

Kronstein developed herself as an artist though study of the "old masters[']" art when she travelled to Italy and other places periodically. She additionally educated herself on "Japanese classical brush painting," and was interested in Impressionist artwork, especially Paul Cézanne. She also took interest in literary, cinematic, and artistic German Expressionism.

Kronstein rented an art studio in 1933 with help from Robert's economic support. There, she worked many days and nights at her work, while running a salon as well. She featured her "graphic work, portraits and landscapes" at her own exhibits. Her evolution as an artist was stunted by the Anschluss (1938). Not long after, Robert moved to Vaduz in Liechtenstein (Robert founded another pharmacy there in 1933.) During a Nazi street raid, Ili was coerced to scrub the sidewalk. Gerda and Ili were held in jail for six weeks (April 1938) "as hostages for Robert." Prior to their release, it was required that Ili declare in writing that she and her children would leave Austria immediately, however, three months passed before they could leave Austria to reunite with Robert. At first, Kronstein felt free spirited, as she had just escaped from Nazi influence. However, that positivity was replaced by "restlessness and unhappiness," because she resented "the uncultured provincialism of Vaduz" and she did not have a studio. During this time, Nora attended a Swiss boarding school, and Gerda went to Zürich, Switzerland in hopes of obtaining a visa to the U.S. Kronstein then left Vaduz and visited in Zürich periodically. In Zürich, she roomed with Gerda in a "cheap, small room," consumed food moderately, but took relish in the cultural resources. In 1938, both Ili and Gerda were held in jail as foreigners and deportation to Germany was threatened upon them. Robert managed to change their deportation location to Liechtenstein.

Kronstein left Liechtenstein, and stayed for a brief time in Paris, France. She then left for southern France. There, her artistic creativity blossomed. She started working with colors, and her works gained more depth. During this time, her style bordered cubism and abstraction. She spent time in Nice and befriended inspirational artists who taught her valuable lessons. In this circle of inspirations was Latvian painter Rudolf Ray-Rapaport, and he and Kronstein became close friends.

The Kronsteins still planned to emigrate, but in June 1941 Ili's application for a U.S. visa was denied. In the past, she was confined in Gurs internment camp for six weeks alongside ten thousand refugees, both Jews and anti-Fascists. Also in Gurs was Charlotte Salomon and Hannah Arendt. In Gurs, Kronstein showed "remarkable courage, good humor and resourcefulness," despite dwindling health. In late 1940, Kronstein endured paralysis of her right arm. Later on in 1945, Kronstein was diagnosed with multiple sclerosis. Over the course of the year 1941, she could not work for extended amounts of time, however, she still drew until she could no longer grip a pencil. Following Ray-Rapaport's immigration to the U.S. in 1942, Kronstein went to Liechtenstein and later to Switzerland in order to receive treatment for her illnesses. She was paralyzed yet mentally attentive and spent her last four years of life in private care in Zürich. She died at the age of fifty-one on 22 April 1948.
