= Tom Pedi =

American actor (1913–1996)

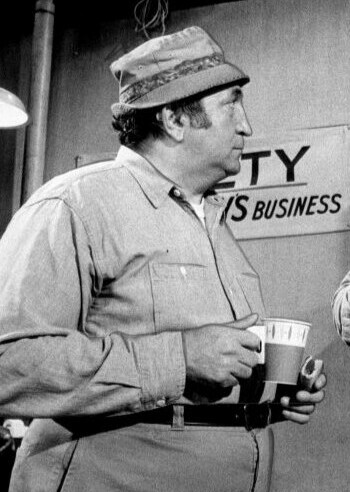
- Pedi in a scene from Arnie (1971)
- Born: Thomas Joseph Pedi; September 14, 1913; Brooklyn, New York City, US
- Died: December 29, 1996 (aged 83); Burbank, California, US
- Education: New Utrecht High School
- Occupation: Actor
- Years active: 1937–1987
- Spouse: Stacey Hunter
- Children: 1

Thomas Joseph Pedi (September 14, 1913 – December 29, 1996) was an American actor whose work included roles on stage, television and film in a career spanning 50 years. He was particularly well-known for his portrayal of Rocky, the night barman, in The Iceman Cometh, a part which he originated and played on stage, film and television. Pedi was the cousin of voice actress Christine Pedi.

== Early life ==
Pedi was born in Brooklyn, the son of Angelo Pedi and Carmen Raimondo. He attended New Utrecht High School, graduating in 1933.

== Career ==
Pedi made his professional debut in 1937 as Benito Mussolini in the Harold Rome revue, Pins and Needles.

== Personal life and death ==
On August 7, 1953, Pedi married Philadelphia-born showgirl Stacey Hunter in London, while in the midst of an extended engagement with the touring company of Guys and Dolls. By the time the couple returned to the U.S. the following October, they had a young son, Alexander, in tow.

Pedi died of a heart attack on December 29, 1996, at age 83, in Burbank, California. His cremated remains are interred at Loma Vista Memorial Park in Fullerton, California.

== Performances ==
=== Theater ===
Except where indicated, listings come from the Internet Broadway Database.

Start	End	Title	Role
September 28, 1937		Pins and Needles	Benito Mussolini
December 21, 1941	February 7, 1942	Brooklyn USA	The Dasher
October 27, 1945	November 17, 1945	Beggars Are Coming to Town	Heinz
October 9, 1946	March 15, 1947	The Iceman Cometh	Rocky Pioggi
February 10, 1949	November 18, 1950	Death of a Salesman	Stanley
September 29, 1955	February 4, 1956	A View from the Bridge / A Memory of Two Mondays	Mike / Mechanic
February 28, 1957	July 13, 1957	A Hole in the Head	Lenny
March 23, 1963	April 6, 1963	My Mother, My Father and Me	Tonio Crazzo
November 11, 1963	November 16, 1963	The Resistible Rise of Arturo Ui	Bodyguard
April 28, 1965; April 20, 1955; November 24, 1950	May 9, 1965; May 31, 1955; November 28, 1953	Guys and Dolls	Harry the Horse
October 4, 1966	December 31, 1966	The Investigation	The Accused
April 18, 1968	April 20, 1968	Mike Downstairs	Paul

Pedi also performed in the premiere of the stage version of State Fair at The Muny in St. Louis in 1969. The show had a two week run.

=== Film ===
Year	Title	Role	Notes
1942	Native Land	Union member intently watching game of checkers	
1948	The Naked City	Detective Perelli	
1948	State of the Union	Barber	
1948	Up in Central Park	O'Toole	
1949	Criss Cross	Vincent	
1949	Sorrowful Jones	Once Over Sam	
1950	Cry Murder	Santorre	
1973	The Iceman Cometh	Rocky Pioggi	
1974	The Taking of Pelham One Two Three	Caz Dolowicz	
1976	Won Ton Ton: The Dog Who Saved Hollywood	Moving Man	Uncredited
1976	St. Ives	Fat Angie Polaterra	
1978	The Cat from Outer Space	Honest Harry	
1978	The One Man Jury	Angie	
1979	The North Avenue Irregulars	Bartender	
1980	Little Miss Marker	Vittorio	

=== Television ===
Except where indicated, listings come from the Internet Movie Database.

Year	Series	Role	Notes
1949	The Philco Television Playhouse		Episode: "The Five Lives of Richard Gordon"
1949	The Chevrolet Tele-Theatre		Episode: "The Door"
1950	The Stage Door	Rocco	
1952	The Philco Television Playhouse	Joe	Episode: "Rich Boy"
1956	Stanley	Mr. Ferris	Episode: "Opera Tickets"
1958	Decoy	Maxie Pardo	Episode: "Odds Against the Jockey"
1958	Omnibus	Bolo	Episode: "The So-Called Human Race"
1958	Adventures of the Sea Hawk	Le Gross	Episode #1.23
1960	The Play of the Week	Rocky	Episode: The Iceman Cometh Parts: 1 & 2
1967	The Edge of Night	Hector	Episode #1.3048
1970	That Girl	Tony	Episode: "The Night They Raided Daddy's"
1971	Night Gallery	Mr. Boucher	Episode: "A Fear of Spiders"
1970–1971	Arnie	Julius	15 episodes
1972	The Family Rico	Angelo	TV movie
1973	The New Treasure Hunt	Various	Uncredited
1973	Maude	Mr. Bungay	Episode: "Maude Takes a Job"
1973	Lotsa Luck	First Moving Man	Episode: "The Family Plot"Arnie"
1974	McMillan & Wife	News Vendor	Episode: "Cross & Double Cross"
1974	Dominic's Dream	Uncle Willie	TV movie
1974	Kojak	Filacchione	Episode: "You Can't Tell a Hurt Man How to Holler"
1975	The Mary Tyler Moore Show	Al	Episode: "The System"
1975	The Odd Couple	Louie Menninni	Episode: "Old Flames Never Die"
1975	Lucas Tanner	Policeman	Episode: "The Noise of a Quiet Weekend"
1976	McCloud	Santa Claus	Episode: "'Twas the Fight Before Christmas..."
1977	Serpico	Nick	Episode: "The Party of Your Choice"
1977	Black Market Baby	Uncle Sanchi	TV movie
1978	CHiPs	Bruno	Episode: "Vintage '54"
1978	Human Feelings	Frank	TV movie
1979	The Ropers	Moving Man	Episode: "Friends and Neighbors"
1979	Stone	Aaron Abromowitz	TV movie
1987	Laguna Heat	Jimmy Hylkama	TV movie, (final film role)
