= The Caroline Rhea Show =

American television talk show

- Genre: Talk show
- Written by: Cathy Ladman; Joe Toplyn
- Directed by: Debbie Miller; Caroline Rhea
- Presented by: Caroline Rhea
- Country of origin: United States
- Original language: English
- No. of seasons: 1
- No. of episodes: 195

Production
- Production locations: NBC Studios; New York, New York
- Running time: 60 minutes (with commercials)
- Production companies: Travail D'Amour Productions Inc. Telepictures Productions

Original release
- Network: Syndicated
- Release: September 2, 2002 – May 21, 2003

The Caroline Rhea Show is an American syndicated variety/talk show hosted by Caroline Rhea. It premiered on September 2, 2002, and ran until May 21, 2003. The show was regarded as the successor to The Rosie O'Donnell Show; Rosie O'Donnell selected Rhea, who had hosted the last few weeks of Rosie, as her replacement.

== Format ==
In many ways, The Caroline Rhea Show was similar to its predecessor The Rosie O'Donnell Show and the more successful The Ellen DeGeneres Show; all three programs were daytime talk shows that were run like nighttime talk shows, with monologues and house bands and celebrity (and sometimes non-celebrity) guests. Publications including USA Today and Emmy regarded Rhea as the successor to Rosie.

Unlike O'Donnell's daytime show, on which audience members opened the shows by announcing the day's guests, announcer Chip Zien would begin each episode by saying, "Live from New York, it's The Caroline Rhea Show! On today's show: [names of guests]...Here's Caroline!" The first five words, "Live from New York, it's," mimicked the opening tagline to Saturday Night Live, produced in the neighboring Studio 8-H. The show's intro song was Neil Diamond's "Sweet Caroline," and the audience would often sing along, vocalizing the three notes after the song's eponymous chorus and chanting "so good, so good" in response to "good times never seemed so good."

== Production ==
Like its predecessor, The Caroline Rhea Show was taped in Studio 8-G at NBC's Rockefeller Center Studios in New York City. The show's house band was led by trumpeter Chris Botti. Former David Bowie guitarist and musical collaborator Carlos Alomar was the musical director.

== Broadcast history ==
Some stations that aired Rosie also aired Caroline Rhea, though others—notably the ABC owned-and-operated stations, which opted for the co-owned The Wayne Brady Show—replaced it with other programming. This deprived Rhea of three of the 10 highest-rated stations for Rosie in the top 50 markets (WABC-TV, WPVI-TV, WTVD, each of which aired it at 10 a.m.) and sent it into overnight periods in key markets; for instance, WABC-TV aired Rhea in the less desirable time slot of 12:35 a.m. This directly contributed to low ratings and its cancellation after one season.

For the 2003–2004 season, Warner Bros. Television's Telepictures division offered The Ellen DeGeneres Show and The Sharon Osbourne Show to stations. These shows launched with major clearances from the NBC O&Os and Tribune Broadcasting, respectively. Ellen in particular was regarded by Broadcasting & Cable as another attempt to succeed Rosie.
