= Requiem for a Heavyweight (film) =

1962 American film by Ralph Nelson

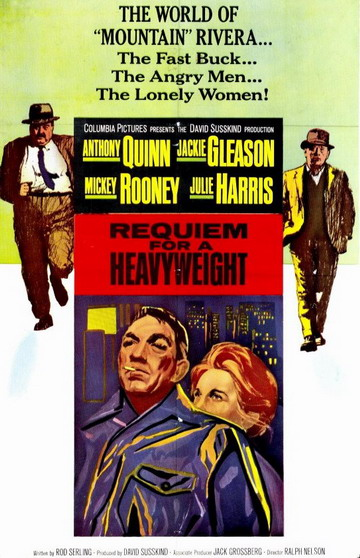
- Directed by: Ralph Nelson
- Written by: Rod Serling
- Based on: "Requiem for a Heavyweight" by Rod Serling
- Produced by: David Susskind
- Starring: Anthony Quinn; Jackie Gleason; Mickey Rooney; Julie Harris
- Cinematography: Arthur J. Ornitz
- Edited by: Carl Lerner
- Music by: Laurence Rosenthal
- Distributed by: Columbia Pictures
- Release date: October 16, 1962
- Running time: 95 minutes
- Country: United States
- Language: English
- Budget: $1.1 million
- Box office: $1.3 million (US/Canada)

Requiem for a Heavyweight is a 1962 American film directed by Ralph Nelson based on the television play of the same name with Anthony Quinn in the role originated by Jack Palance and Jackie Gleason and Mickey Rooney in the parts portrayed on television by Keenan Wynn and his father Ed Wynn. Social worker Grace Miller was portrayed by Julie Harris. Muhammad Ali, then known as Cassius Marcellus Clay Jr., appears as Quinn's opponent in a boxing match at the beginning of the movie.

The film version is somewhat darker in its plotline than the original teleplay.

== Plot ==
Luis "Mountain" Rivera is an aging heavyweight boxer. He is managed by Maish Rennick, and Army serves as his cutman. During his latest bout, against young up-and-comer Cassius Clay, Mountain takes a serious beating and the doctor refuses to certify Mountain for future fights. Afterward, Maish is confronted by Ma Greeny and her thugs. They threaten Maish's life if he fails to repay them for the losses they incurred after betting that Mountain would go down in the fourth round of the match - a fix that Maish had guaranteed. Maish's deal with them had been that they should deduct from their winnings the vast sums of money that Maish's betting losses had run up with them.

Meanwhile, Mountain struggles to find a job and visits an employment agency, where he meets Grace Miller. Grace is initially standoffish but quickly becomes sympathetic to Mountain, and says she'll be in touch. Later, Grace meets with Mountain to tell him of an opening for a counselor position at a children's camp, which interests Mountain. The two bond over a drink and Mountain shares stories of his time in the ring.

Mountain returns to his apartment - shared with Maish and Army - where Maish proposes the three get into professional wrestling. Mountain is reluctant, not liking the staged nature of wrestling. Maish, hoping that Mountain will forget about the job interview, takes him to a bar, where they both get drunk. Army arrives at the bar to remind Mountain about the appointment. However, Rivera embarrasses himself at the hotel where the interview is to take place by behaving drunkenly in plain sight of the camp owners. After this episode, Grace confronts Maish in tears, condemning him for controlling Mountain and ruining his chance to make a new life for himself. Maish responds forcefully and eloquently to Grace's accusation that he has been over-controlling of Mountain, disputing the notion that he cares nothing for the boxer, his best interests, and his future. He tells Grace that she must stop daydreaming and recognize that her idealized conception of Luis Rivera is as false and damaging to the fighter as is Maish's alleged mediocre management of the boxer's career. Further, he tells her that her so-called "vision" for Rivera's post-boxing future as a counselor at a children's summer camp is as naïve and pathetic as it is improbable.

To pay off Maish's gambling debts, Mountain agrees to perform as Native American wrestling persona "Big Chief Mountain Rivera." Just prior to entering the ring for his first match, an overwhelming tide of humiliation sweeps over Mountain, causing him to change his mind. Maish blurts out that he bet against Mountain in the fight against Clay, and as Rivera attempts to leave the locker room, Ma Greeny and her thugs enter, threatening Maish. This causes Mountain to change his mind and agree to wrestle, thereby allowing Ma to be paid and saving Maish's life.

In the final scene of the film, Mountain enters the ring amidst jeering ridicule to face Haystacks Calhoun, a wrestler from Arkansas billed at 601 pounds (273 kg).

== Cast ==
- Anthony Quinn as Luis "Mountain" Rivera
- Jackie Gleason as Maish Rennick
- Mickey Rooney as Army
- Julie Harris as Grace Miller
- Stan Adams as Perelli
- Madame Spivy as Ma Greeny
- Val Avery as Young fighter's promoter
- Herbie Faye as Charlie, the Bartender
- Jack Dempsey as himself
- Cassius Clay as himself
- Haystack Calhoun as himself (uncredited)

== Reception ==
The film was met with positive reviews upon its release. Rotten Tomatoes gives it a rating of 89% from a sample of 46 critics with the consensus: "Requiem for a Heavyweight is a stirring character study of a battered boxer that may at times pummel its message yet retains cinematic métier and human nobility." Director Ralph Nelson, however, was critical of his lead star's performance. In a letter to Life magazine, he wrote: "As written, the hero was a lonely, sensitive human being, a prizefighter who had worked out his hostilities in the ring. Jack Palance won an Emmy for his hauntingly gentle performance on Playhouse 90. Quinn was afraid that gentleness would reflect upon his image of masculinity, so chose to play Sonny Liston instead. I believe Palance's concept was truer to the role and fulfilled the concept of the script more effectively than Quinn's attempt to dominate it."

== See also ==
- List of boxing films
