= Caroline Rhea =

Canadian actress and comedian (born 1964)

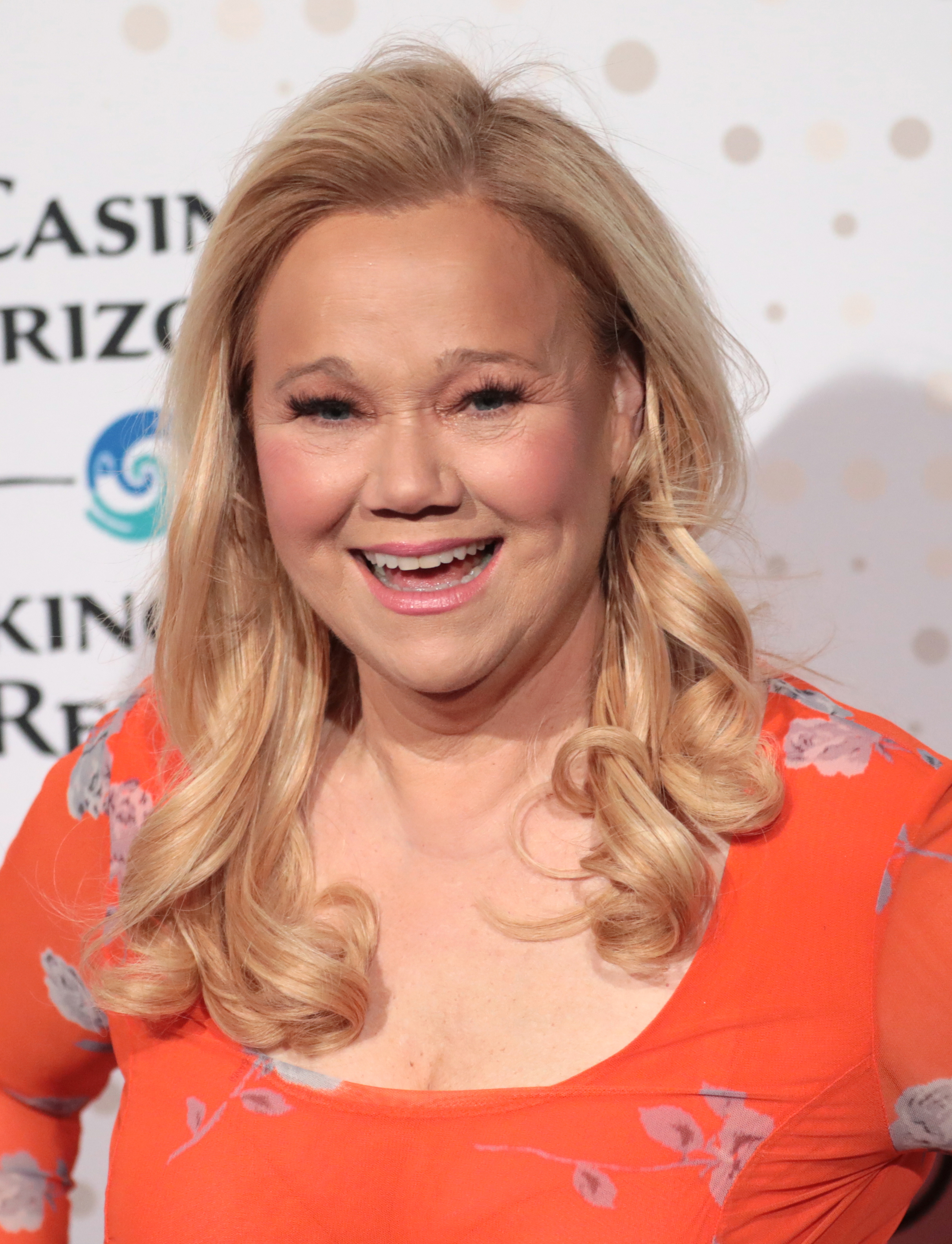
- Rhea in April 2023
- Born: Caroline Gilchrist Rhea; April 13, 1964 (age 62); Westmount, Quebec, Canada
- Citizenship: Canada; United States
- Education: University of Arizona
- Occupations: Actress; stand-up comedian
- Years active: 1986–present
- Partner: Costaki Economopoulos (2007–2010)
- Children: 1

Caroline Gilchrist Rhea (/ˈreɪ/; born April 13, 1964) is a Canadian actress and stand-up comedian, best known for her role as Hilda Spellman on the ABC series Sabrina the Teenage Witch and for voicing Linda Flynn-Fletcher in the Disney Channel animated series Phineas and Ferb.

She has performed numerous comedy specials, including three one-hour standup specials for HBO, Showtime, and Bravo. She is also known as a regular on Hollywood Squares with her friend Whoopi Goldberg. Rhea was chosen by Rosie O'Donnell as the new hostess of her syndicated talk show (renamed The Caroline Rhea Show) and hosted the reality television show The Biggest Loser on NBC for the first three seasons. She appeared regularly on ABC's Match Game with Alec Baldwin from 2016 to 2020. She also returned to the Disney Channel to portray Judy Reynolds in the comedy series Sydney to the Max, which aired from 2019 to 2021.

== Early life ==
Rhea was born and raised in Westmount, Quebec, the daughter of Margery and David Rhea, an obstetrician and gynecologist. She has two sisters, Cynthia and Celia. She attended The Study, an all-girls private school in Westmount, Quebec; Dalhousie University in Nova Scotia; and the University of Arizona.

== Career ==
=== Standup ===
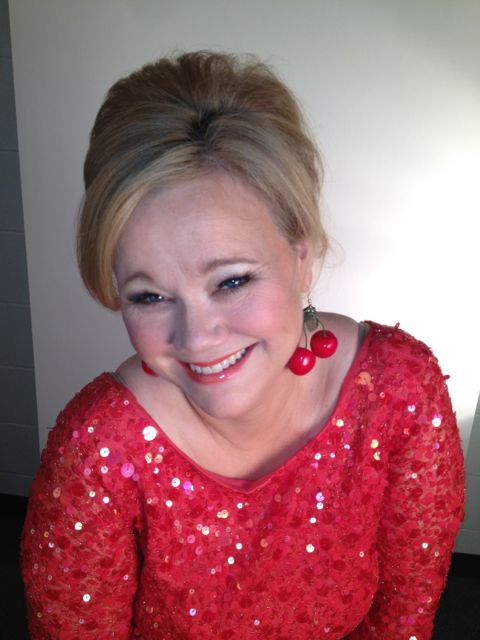
Rhea in 2012

Rhea moved to New York in 1986 to pursue a career as a comedian and actress. She began performing at venues like Catch a Rising Star and The Comic Strip, where she performed along with comedians including Chris Rock, Louis C.K., Dave Attell, Marc Maron, and Jim Gaffigan. She made her first filmed standup appearances on MTV's Half-Hour Comedy Hour, Comic Strip Live, and Caroline's Comedy Hour.

Rhea was given a one-hour special for HBO, called One Night Stand. She followed it up with Rhea's Anatomy, her one-hour special for Bravo, and Give Me My Remote for Showtime.

Even as recently as New Year's Eve 2024, Rhea continues to perform live comedy shows.

=== Film and television ===
After finding success in New York as a comedian, Caroline moved to Los Angeles to pursue an acting career in Hollywood, debuting on NBC's television series Pride & Joy, where she co-starred with Jeremy Piven. She later gained widespread fame for her role as Aunt Hilda on the ABC (and later, The WB) series Sabrina the Teenage Witch and for her recurring role on the latest incarnation of Hollywood Squares.

Rhea is also well known for her voice role as Linda Flynn-Fletcher on the long-running Disney Channel animated series Phineas and Ferb; for her syndicated daytime talk show, The Caroline Rhea Show; as the original host of The Biggest Loser on NBC; and for playing Noleta Nethercott on the TV series Sordid Lives: The Series for Logo, and a sequel film A Very Sordid Wedding.

In 2004, she appeared in the Christmas comedy film Christmas with the Kranks. In 2005, Rhea appeared in The Perfect Man, playing a co-worker of Jean (Heather Locklear) and had a recurring role on the Disney Channel Original Series, The Suite Life of Zack & Cody as Ilsa Shickelgubermeiger-Von Helsing der Keppelugerhofer, an inspector turned manager of the rival hotel. In 2007, she starred in the original Lifetime Television movie To Be Fat Like Me opposite Kaley Cuoco and in the Fox animated series Two Dreadful Children.

In 2008, Rhea starred alongside Justin Guarini and Mircea Monroe in the MarVista Entertainment production of Fast Girl. In 2013, Rhea hosted a travelling live stage show version of the game show Family Feud that toured fairs in the US and Canada, including the Calgary Stampede. In 2017, she began a recurring role on ABC's revival of Match Game. She appeared in 21 episodes, her last airing in October 2020.

Rhea has competed on Bravo's Celebrity Poker Showdown and GSN's World Series of Blackjack, and has also done a live webcast with author Meg Cabot.

In 2018, Rhea began hosting Caroline & Friends on GSN. The series features funny videos of animals and children. The studio audience votes for the best video from ones chosen by Rhea and her two guest comedian co-hosts. The show lasted for one season.

In 2019, Rhea began appearing as Judy, the grandmother, in the Disney Channel sitcom Sydney to the Max, which premiered January 25, 2019 and ran for three seasons until November 2021. The role got her a spot amongst a team of contemporary moms on the network for an episode of Celebrity Family Feud which aired in 2020.

=== Charity work ===
Rhea has appeared at Comic Relief as well as the Ms. Foundation's "Women of Comedy from Caroline's Comedy Club". She appeared as a contestant in 2001 on a special edition of Who Wants to Be a Millionaire, winning $125,000 for her charity.

== Personal life ==
Rhea and her former partner, comedian Costaki Economopoulos, have a daughter, Ava (b. October 2008).

Rhea's parents were diagnosed with cancer one week apart. Her mother, Margery, was diagnosed with breast cancer and her father, David, with lung cancer. David died 10 months later; Margery lived another six years.

== Filmography ==
=== Film ===
Year	Title	Role	Notes
1986	Meatballs III: Summer Job	Beach girl #4	Debut role, Uncredited
1996	The Shot	Casting director	
1999	Man on the Moon	Fridays' Melanie Chartoff	
2000	Ready to Rumble	Eugenia King	
2001	Happy Birthday	Monica	
2004	Christmas with the Kranks	Candi	
2005	The Perfect Man	Gloria	
2008	Fast Girl	Maddie	
2009	Love N' Dancing	Bonnie	
2015	Being Canadian	Herself	Documentary
2017	A Very Sordid Wedding	Noleta Nethercott	
2020	Phineas and Ferb the Movie: Candace Against the Universe	Linda Flynn-Fletcher	Voice role
2025	Are We Good?	Herself	Documentary
2028	Untitled Third Phineas and Ferb Movie	Linda Flynn-Flectcher	Voice role

=== Television ===
Year	Title	Role	Notes
1993	Fools for Love	Herself	Host
1995	Pride & Joy	Carol Green	Main role
1996–2003	Sabrina the Teenage Witch	Hilda Spellman	Main role (seasons 1–6); guest role (season 7)
1996	The Drew Carey Show	Bonnie	2 episodes
1997	Dr. Katz, Professional Therapist	Caroline	Voice role; episode: "Big Fat Slug"
1999	Larry David: Curb Your Enthusiasm	Herself	Television special
2000	Happily Ever After: Fairy Tales for Every Child	Spidey	Voice role; episode: "The Steadfast Tin Soldier"
2000	Mom's Got a Date with a Vampire	Lynette Hansen	Television film
2001	The Santa Claus Brothers	Mrs. Claus	Television film; voice role
2002	Fillmore!	Mrs. Konquist	Voice role; episode: "Nappers Never Sleep"
2002–2003	The Caroline Rhea Show	Herself	Daytime talk show
2004–2006	The Biggest Loser	Herself	Host (seasons 1–3)
2005–2006	The Suite Life of Zack & Cody	Ilsa	3 episodes
2005–2006	Kathy Griffin: My Life on the D-List	Herself	2 episodes, "Out & About" and "Puppy Chaos"
2007	To Be Fat Like Me	Madelyn	Television film
2007–2015, 2025–present	Phineas and Ferb	Linda Flynn-Fletcher, Betty Jo Flynn, additional voices	Main voice role
2008	Sordid Lives: The Series	Noleta Nethercott	Main role
2009	Larry the Cable Guy's Hula-Palooza Christmas Luau	Shopper #1 / Grandma / Mrs. Claus	Television film
2011	Phineas and Ferb the Movie: Across the 2nd Dimension	Linda Flynn-Fletcher / Linda 2	Television film; voice role
2011	Cake Walk: Wedding Cake Edition	Herself	Host
2012	Sunshine Sketches of a Little Town	Mrs. Diston	Television film
2012	The Christmas Consultant	Maya Fletcher	Television film
2013	Baby Daddy	Jennifer Perrin	Episode: "On the Lamb-y"
2014	Maron	Herself	Episode: "Nostalgic Sex Buddy"
2014	Manhattan Love Story	Coach Reisner	Episode: "The Ex Factor"
2015	2 Broke Girls	Bonnie	Episode: "And the Disappointing Unit"
2016	The Grinder	Fran	Episode: "Genesis"
2016	Bruno & Boots: Go Jump in the Pool	Eugenia Scrimmage	Television film
2016–2025	Match Game	Herself (Panelist)	23 episodes
2017	Bruno & Boots: The Wizzle War, This Can't Be Happening at Macdonald Hall	Eugenia Scrimmage	Television film
2017–2019	Funny You Should Ask	Herself (Panelist)	51 episodes
2018	Caroline & Friends	Herself	Host
2018	A Christmas in Tennessee	Mrs. Claus	Television film
2019–2021	Sydney to the Max	Judy Reynolds	Main role
2020	The Blame Game	Herself (Panelist)	Episode: 27 November 2020
2020	Chilling Adventures of Sabrina	Sitcom Hilda Spellman (Parallel Cosmos-modified version)	2 episodes
2021	Debbie Macomber's A Mrs. Miracle Christmas	Gloria Merkel (Mrs. Miracle)	Television film
2022	LOL: Last One Laughing Canada	Herself (Contestant)	6 episodes
2022	Lopez vs Lopez	Jana	Recurring Cast
2024	Extended Family	Lana Telsoup	Episode: "The Consequences of Being Irish"
2024	Holiday Mismatch	Kath	Television film Hallmark Channel
2025	Sheriff Country	Gina	Recurring Cast

=== Video games ===
Year	Title	Role	Notes
1999	Sabrina, the Teenage Witch: Spellbound	Hilda Spellman	
2013	Phineas and Ferb: Quest for Cool Stuff	Linda Flynn-Fletcher	

== See also ==
- List of Quebec comedians
- List of Canadian comedians
