= Joe Toplyn =

American television writer, producer, and author

- Education: Harvard University (BA, MBA)
- Occupations: Television writer; producer; author
- Partner: Sherryl Judd Toplyn (1983–present)
- Awards: 4 Primetime Emmy Awards (writing)
- Website: joetoplyn.com

Joe Toplyn is an American television writer, producer, and author whose credits include Late Night with David Letterman, The Tonight Show with Jay Leno, Late Show with David Letterman, the sketch series In Living Color, and the detective comedy series Monk. He is a four-time Primetime Emmy Award winner for writing on Late Night with David Letterman and has served as head writer or co-head writer on both The Tonight Show with Jay Leno and Late Show with David Letterman. He is also the author of the instructional book Comedy Writing for Late-Night TV and the creator of Witscript, an AI-powered joke-writing system.

== Early life and education ==
Toplyn studied applied physics and computer science at Harvard College, where he joined The Harvard Lampoon and became an editor. He graduated from Harvard with a degree in engineering and later received an MBA from Harvard Business School. Before entering television writing he worked in business roles, including financial analysis at Columbia Pictures.

== Career ==
After several years of working in business, Toplyn joined the writing staff of NBC's Late Night with David Letterman in the 1980s, after being recruited by head writer Jim Downey, a former Lampoon colleague. He spent about six years on the show, and his work on Late Night earned him four Primetime Emmy Awards for outstanding writing.

After leaving Late Night, Toplyn wrote sketches for the Fox series In Living Color and moved into situation comedies including Doctor Doctor, Charlie Hoover, Hangin' with Mr. Cooper, and The Larry Sanders Show. He served as head writer on the short-lived The Chevy Chase Show and later became co-head writer of The Tonight Show with Jay Leno and head writer of CBS's Late Show with David Letterman, also working as a producer on the latter. In the 2000s Toplyn joined the writing staff of the USA Network detective comedy Monk, where his credits include writer and co-executive producer. His other television credits include producing and head-writing for the daytime talk series The Caroline Rhea Show.

From the mid-2010s Toplyn has focused increasingly on computational humor. He developed Witscript, a patented software system that generates monologue-style jokes from user prompts and is marketed as subscription software by his company Twenty Lane Media, LLC. Toplyn is also the author of Comedy Writing for Late-Night TV: How to Write Monologue Jokes, Desk Pieces, Sketches, Parodies, Audience Pieces, Remotes, and Other Short-Form Comedy, first published in 2014 by Twenty Lane Media, LLC.

== Personal life ==
Toplyn married Sherryl Judd Toplyn in 1983. Together, they have two sons, and reside in Westchester County, New York.
