= Penn Jones Jr. =

American journalist and JFK assassination researcher (1914–1998)

- Born: William Penn Jones Jr. October 14, 1914; Lane's Chapel, Texas, United States
- Died: January 25, 1998 (aged 83); Alvarado, Texas, United States
- Education: Magnolia A&M Junior College; University of Texas at Austin
- Occupations: Journalist, newspaper editor, author
- Known for: Forgive My Grief

William Penn Jones Jr. (October 14, 1914 – January 25, 1998) was an American journalist, author, and longtime owner and editor of the weekly Texas newspaper, Midlothian Mirror. He was an early JFK assassination conspiracy theorist. He focused his research on the deaths of assassination witnesses. His best-known work was the four-volume series, Forgive My Grief.

== Early life and education ==
Jones was born in Lane's Chapel, Texas, in 1914. He was one of eight children of William Penn Jones, a sharecropper, and Gussie Earline Jones (née Browning). Three of his siblings died in infancy. The family moved to Annona, Texas after purchasing a farm. Jones graduated from Clarksville High School in 1932, and then attended Magnolia A&M Junior College in Arkansas.

In 1935 he enrolled at the University of Texas at Austin (UT). It was there he met an economics professor whom he credited with shaping his liberal political views. While at UT, Jones took law classes with fellow students Henry Wade and John Connally—Wade would become the Dallas District Attorney, and Connolly the 39th Governor of Texas; both men figured significantly in the JFK assassination. In 1940, Jones dropped out of UT, later admitting that the coursework was too difficult.

== Career ==
=== Military service ===
In 1933, Jones joined the Texas National Guard. After the outbreak of World War II, he was called to active duty as a lieutenant in the 36th Infantry Division. Initially stationed in Austin, he was sent overseas in 1943 and fought in Italy, North Africa, France and Germany. He earned a Bronze Star Medal while attaining the rank of captain. Jones retired from the Guard in 1963, at which time Texas Governor John Connally promoted him to Brevet Brigadier General.

=== Journalism ===
In 1946, Jones bought the Midlothian Mirror newspaper for $4,000. In the paper he expressed his liberal views on racial equality, which antagonized many of the residents of the small town of Midlothian, Texas (pop. 1,200). In 1956 Jones and his friend John Howard Griffin attempted to desegregate public schools in nearby Mansfield, Texas, but were thwarted by a KKK-led mob.

Jones frequently editorialized against the Midlothian school board and its conservative leadership. In April 1962, when Midlothian High School invited a guest speaker from the right-wing John Birch Society, Jones stormed into the school board president's office and demanded equal time. A fistfight ensued that had to be broken up by the police. Three days later, in the early morning hours of April 30, the office of the Midlothian Mirror was firebombed. The incident made national news, and contributed to Jones receiving the 1963 Elijah Parish Lovejoy Award for Courage in Journalism. Numerous congratulatory messages were sent to Jones, including one from President John F. Kennedy.

=== JFK assassination research ===
On November 22, 1963, Jones was among the group of reporters at the Dallas Trade Mart awaiting JFK's arrival to give a speech at a luncheon event. When Jones learned of the shooting in Dealey Plaza, he drove to Parkland Hospital and took photographs of members of the motorcade as well as of the presidential limousine. He said he tearfully saluted his dead commander-in-chief when the coffin was brought out of the hospital.

Jones became known as one of the first prominent critics of the Warren Commission, and for alleging that people connected to the assassination were dying under mysterious circumstances. In May 1966 he self-published Forgive My Grief, printing 7,500 copies at his own expense. The book anthologized his Midlothian Mirror editorials on the assassination. The title came from a passage in Alfred, Lord Tennyson's 1850 poem, In Memoriam A.H.H.:

Forgive my grief for one removed,
Thy creature. whom I found so fair.
I trust he lives in thee, and there
I find him worthier to be loved.

The book offers a critical analysis of the 26-volume Warren Commission Hearings & Exhibits. In each chapter, Jones prints excerpts from a different witness's testimony, interspersed with his own commentary where he lists what he considers obvious follow-up questions that should have been asked. He also cites testimony that he believes suggested an assassination conspiracy, but was downplayed or ignored by the Commission's lawyers. Forgive My Grief would eventually grow into a four-volume work published over a ten-year span.

While conducting his own inquiry into JFK's death, Robert F. Kennedy invited Jones to Washington, D.C., to present his research. When they greeted in Kennedy's Senate office, he reportedly told Jones, "Look, I'll listen to what you have to say. I won't necessarily agree or disagree, but I'll listen."

With his close proximity to Dallas, Jones was able to interview many assassination witnesses and provide on-the-scene reporting. For instance, he was the first to investigate the August 1966 fatal car crash involving Lee Bowers. In Volume I of Forgive My Grief, Jones identified thirteen assassination witnesses who were "missing, murdered, or met with death strangely". On the cover page of Forgive My Grief, Volume II (1967), he wrote: "This book gives names and details of THE STRANGE DEATHS OF 24 PEOPLE who knew something, learned something or saw something that was supposed to have remained secret." He then noted in Chapter One: "With the mounting list of these deaths, the likelihood grows that these people have been systematically and skillfully eliminated." By 1973 he was claiming there had been at least 70 "strange deaths". As of 1984, he calculated over 100 witnesses had died by murder, suicide, or other unnatural causes.

=== Media appearances ===
External audio
- Interview with William O'Connell (September 26, 1966). KPFK. Los Angeles: Pacifica Radio Archive. Introduction by James DiEugenio.
- Interview with Mae Brussell (February 24, 1975). Dialogue: Conspiracy, no. 185.

After the 1966 publication of Forgive My Grief, Jones was invited on radio and television programs. He was briefly interviewed on the CBS Evening News. He had a more extended discussion on a local Los Angeles TV show, hosted by Louis Lomax.

In the 1967 Emile de Antonio-directed documentary film Rush to Judgment, based on the bestseller by Mark Lane, Jones is quoted as saying:

[M]y actual investigating did not begin until I started reading the Warren Report and realized that something was very, very much amiss.... I really believe that the only way you can believe the Warren Report is to not read it.

Jones also appears in Lane's 1976 documentary, Two Men in Dallas, where he introduces viewers to the subject of the film: Roger Craig, a former Dallas deputy sheriff and assassination witness. Jones was credited as a researcher for the 1973 film Executive Action, and made his final documentary appearance in The Assassination of JFK (1992).

=== Later years ===
After selling the Midlothian Mirror in 1974, Jones founded The Continuing Inquiry newsletter, where he wrote more assassination-related articles. His co-editor Gary Mack subsequently became curator of the Sixth Floor Museum at Dealey Plaza. As Mack recalled, Penn was "a crusty, no-nonsense guy. He was direct. His language was very colorful in a typical Texas way. He seemed fearless."

By the early 1980s, Jones stated his belief that nine assassins had been flown into Dallas from Oklahoma, and that each fired one bullet at the president. Jones said the fatal headshot to Kennedy was fired from a manhole on Elm Street.

In one of his last public appearances, a frail-looking Jones spoke at a JFK remembrance ceremony held in Dealey Plaza in November 1993. He began: "I'm an old man now, but years ago I wrote four books on the assassination of John Kennedy. I think there were nine guns firing right in this area – two of them from the top of the jail. And it was well-arranged and well-organized, so that there was no chance for the president to escape. I hope someday we'll overcome this, but it will be a long time before we overcome it."

== Personal life ==
Jones was married twice and had two children. He married Louise Angove in July 1941. They had two sons, Penn Jones III (born in 1944) and Michael (born in 1948), and divorced in 1983. That same year, Jones married Elaine Kavanaugh. They remained married until his death.

== Death ==
On January 25, 1998, Jones died of Alzheimer's disease in an Alvarado, Texas nursing home at the age of 83. His funeral was held at the St. Joseph's Catholic Church in Waxahachie, Texas. He was survived by his wife and two sons, and two grandchildren.

== Bibliography ==
Books

- Forgive My Grief I. Midlothian, Tex.: Midlothian Mirror (1966). LCCN 66-22345.

"A Critical Review of the Warren Commission Report on the Assassination of President John F. Kennedy". Preface by John Howard Griffin.

- Forgive My Grief II. Midlothian, Tex.: Midlothian Mirror (1967). OCLC 499979957.

"A Further Critical Review of the Warren Commission Report on the Assassination of President John F. Kennedy". Preface by Maxwell Geismar.

- Forgive My Grief III. Midlothian, Tex.: Midlothian Mirror (1969). OCLC 220392096.

"Now the People Know Who Killed Their President and They Are Totally Afraid". Reprinted with addendum (January 1976).

- Forgive My Grief IV. Midlothian, Tex.: Penn Jones, Jr. (1974). OCLC 867741583.

"A Further Critical Review of the Warren Commission Report on the Assassination of President John F. Kennedy".

Book contributions

- "Editorials from the Midlothian Mirror." In: Welsh, David (editor). In the Shadow of Dallas: A Primer on the Assassination of President Kennedy. San Francisco: Ramparts (1967): 29–49.
- Introduction to Shaw, J. Gary; Harris, Larry R. (1976). Cover-up: The Governmental Conspiracy to Conceal the Facts about the Public Execution of John Kennedy.

Periodicals

- Midlothian Mirror (1946–1974)

Weekly newspaper serving Midlothian, Texas.

- The Continuing Inquiry (1976–1984)

Monthly newsletter exploring the assassinations of John F. Kennedy, Robert F. Kennedy, and Martin Luther King, Jr.

Book reviews

- Review of Aphrodite: Desperate Mission by Jack Olsen. Continuing Inquiry, vol. 2, no. 11 (June 22, 1978): 1–5.
- Review of The Advance Man: An Off-beat Look at What Really Happens in Political Campaigns by Jerry Bruno and Jeff Greenfield. Continuing Inquiry, vol. 2, no. 11 (June 22, 1978): 8, 13.

Articles

- "The Purloined Letter (With apologies to Edgar Allen Poe)". Continuing Inquiry, vol. 1, no. 3 (October 22, 1976): 1–2.
- "Little Philosophy". Continuing Inquiry, vol. 1, no. 3 (October 22, 1976): 13–15.
- "If They're Serious". Continuing Inquiry, vol. 1, no. 4 (November 22, 1976): 11.
- "For Starters". Continuing Inquiry, vol. 1, no. 4 (November 22, 1976): 11.
- "A Little Philosophy (Continued from October issue)". Continuing Inquiry, vol. 1, no. 4 (November 22, 1976): 13–14.
- "Sorensen, Director of Intelligence ???" Continuing Inquiry, vol. 1, no. 6 (January 22, 1977): 2–4.
- "November 22, 1963: Death of a Secret Service Agent?" with Gary Shaw. Continuing Inquiry, vol. 1, no. 6 (January 22, 1977): 4–6.
- "The 'New' Oswald Letter". Continuing Inquiry, vol. 1, no. 7 (February 22, 1977): 9–10.
- "Instructing a Witness". Continuing Inquiry, vol. 1, no. 7 (February 22, 1977): 13–14.
- "Disappearing Witnesses". The Rebel (magazine), vol. 1, no. 1 (November 22, 1983): 36–43.
