= Black Like Me (film) =

1964 film

- Theatrical release poster
- Directed by: Carl Lerner
- Screenplay by: Carl Lerner; Gerda Lerner
- Based on: Black Like Me by John Howard Griffin
- Produced by: Julius Tannenbaum
- Starring: James Whitmore
- Cinematography: Victor Lukens; Henry Mueller II
- Edited by: Lora Hays
- Music by: Meyer Kupferman
- Production company: The Hilltop Company
- Distributed by: Continental Distributing
- Release date: May 20, 1964
- Running time: 107 minutes
- Country: United States
- Language: English
- Budget: $273,000

Black Like Me is a 1964 American drama film based on the 1961 book Black Like Me by John Howard Griffin. The journalist disguised himself to pass as an African-American man for six weeks in 1959 in the Deep South to report on life in the segregated society from the other side of the color line. The film was directed by Carl Lerner and the screenplay was written by Carl and Gerda Lerner. The film stars James Whitmore, Sorrell Booke and Roscoe Lee Browne.

== Plot ==
John Finley Horton is a liberal white journalist who darkens his face and hands (and to some degree his body) using various means, sufficiently to pass for a black man. He travels for several weeks in the Deep South in order to report from the other side of the color line in the segregated society. He spends time in places from New Orleans to Atlanta, and encounters racism from both white and black people.

== Cast ==
- James Whitmore as John Finley Horton
- Sorrell Booke as Dr. Jackson
- Roscoe Lee Browne as Christophe
- Al Freeman Jr. as Thomas Newcomb
- Will Geer as Truck Driver
- Robert Gerringer as Ed Saunders
- Clifton James as Eli Carr
- John Marriott as Hodges
- Thelma Oliver as Georgie
- Lenka Petersen as Lucy Horton
- Richard Ward as Burt Wilson

== Reception ==
Critical reception for the film has been mixed. Bosley Crowther of The New York Times described the film as "melodramatic and unsubtle". He said it failed in two ways: to place the viewer inside an African American's skin in the 1950s and early 1960s, and to convince the audience that the protagonist "is truly passing for black".

Reviewing the film after the 2012 DVD release, Leonard Maltin awarded the film a positive 3 out of 4 stars. He said that, although some aspects of the film felt dated, the film's themes were still timely.

== Release ==
The film made its DVD debut on February 12, 2002, by VCI Home Video. It later was re-released by Video Service Corp on December 11, 2012. This DVD release includes a documentary titled Uncommon Vision about John Howard Griffin, the journalist on whom the main character is based.

== See also ==
- List of American films of 1964
