= Roger D. Craig =

Dallas deputy sheriff and JFK assassination witness (1936–1975)

- Born: Roger Dean Craig; May 12, 1936; Cornell, Wisconsin, U.S.
- Died: May 15, 1975 (aged 39); Dallas, Texas, U.S.
- Occupation: Dallas deputy sheriff
- Known for: JFK assassination witness Subject of 1976 documentary film, Two Men in Dallas

Roger Dean Craig (May 12, 1936 – May 15, 1975) was a Dallas deputy sheriff with first-hand knowledge of the assassination of John F. Kennedy on November 22, 1963. In April 1964, Craig gave testimony to a Warren Commission attorney that contradicted the government's account of the assassination. In July 1967, Craig was fired from the sheriff's department, and subsequently faced a series of life-threatening incidents. In May 1975, he died from a gunshot wound in what was deemed a suicide. A documentary film about him was released in 1976.

== Early life and career ==
Roger Craig was born in Wisconsin in 1936, and spent his early childhood in Minnesota. He ran away from home when he was 12. He worked as a farm laborer in various Midwestern states before marrying at age 16 and settling in Mesquite, Texas outside Dallas. In 1953 he enlisted in the U.S. Army and served in Japan. He was honorably discharged and returned to Texas in 1955.

He worked for several years for the Purex Corporation as a packager. He and his wife Molly had two children, and she also had a son from a previous marriage. In 1959, Craig joined the Dallas County Sheriff's Department where he enjoyed initial success. He was promoted multiple times, and in 1960 won the department's Officer of the Year award.

== JFK assassination ==
Craig was on duty in Dallas on November 22, 1963 when President Kennedy's motorcade drove through Dealey Plaza at 12:30 pm. After hearing shots fired at the President, Craig raced to the grassy knoll where he interviewed several witnesses. About ten minutes later, he heard a "shrill whistle" and saw a man run from behind the Texas School Book Depository (TSBD), down the grassy knoll incline to Elm Street where a "husky looking Latin" was waiting for him in a light-colored Nash Rambler station wagon, with a luggage rack on top. The two men hurriedly drove away.

Craig then joined other officers to search the TSBD. At a few minutes after 1:00 pm, he along with Deputy Constable Seymour Weitzman, Deputy Sheriff Eugene Boone, and Deputy Sheriff Luke Mooney found a rifle near the southeast corner of the sixth floor. They identified it as a German-made 7.65 caliber Mauser bolt-action model. Weitzman and Boone signed affidavits to that effect, and the rifle discovery was announced at a press conference on national TV. The type of rifle soon became a point of contention when the FBI revealed that Lee Harvey Oswald owned an Italian Mannlicher-Carcano. The Warren Report concluded that the rifle was misidentified by the officers that afternoon and it was in fact a Mannlicher-Carcano, but Craig always insisted it was a Mauser.

Craig telephoned Police Captain Will Fritz’s office at 5:00 pm to check if the suspect being held for questioning was the same man Craig saw earlier that afternoon fleeing the TSBD. Craig said he was asked to come look at the suspect in Fritz's office. When Craig got there, he recognized the suspect, Lee Harvey Oswald, as the person he saw running down the grassy knoll to the waiting Rambler station wagon. In his unpublished autobiography, Craig described what happened next:

Fritz and I entered his private office together. He told Oswald, "This man (pointing to me) saw you leave." At which time the suspect replied, "I told you people I did." Fritz, apparently trying to console Oswald, said, "Take it easy, son—we're just trying to find out what happened." Fritz then said, "What about the car?" Oswald replied, leaning forward on Fritz' desk, "That station wagon belongs to Mrs. Paine—don't try to drag her into this." Sitting back in his chair, Oswald said very disgustedly and very low, "Everybody will know who I am now." At this time Capt. Fritz ushered me from his office, thanking me.

Hours after the assassination, Craig's eyewitness account of Oswald being picked up in a station wagon was mentioned on TV news broadcasts, and it was also referenced the next day by Dallas Police Chief Jesse Curry.

== Warren Commission testimony ==
Craig was never called before the members of the Warren Commission. Instead, he gave a deposition in April 1964 to one of the Commission's junior attorneys, David W. Belin. There were two key items in Craig's testimony that conflicted with the Commission's theory of the case:

1. Craig saw Oswald, or someone who looked exactly like him, run down the grassy knoll and get into a Rambler station wagon driven by a dark-complexioned man. This differed from the Commission's account of Oswald's post-assassination movements.
2. Later that afternoon, Craig encountered Oswald again in Captain Fritz's office, and they discussed his departure in the station wagon.

Here was the exchange about item 1 above:

Mr. Belin. All right. And then what did you see happen?
Mr. Craig. I saw a light-colored station wagon, driving real slow, coming west on Elm Street from Houston [Street]. Uh—actually, it was nearly in line with him. And the driver was leaning to his right looking up the hill at the man running down.
Mr. Belin. Uh-huh.
Mr. Craig. And the station wagon stopped almost directly across from me. And, uh, the man continued down the hill and got in the station wagon. And I attempted to cross the street. I wanted to talk to both of them. But the, uh, traffic was so heavy I couldn't get across the street. And, uh, they were gone before I could—
Mr. Belin. Where did the station wagon head?
Mr. Craig. West on Elm Street.
Mr. Belin. Under the triple underpass?
Mr. Craig. Yes.

Later, when Craig read the transcript of his entire testimony in the published Warren Commission hearings, he claimed that he spotted over a dozen changes, all of which cast doubt on the veracity of his testimony. Even with the changes, the Warren Report asserted that "The Commission could not accept important elements of Craig's testimony." As John Kelin argues, "They could not accept that Roger Craig had seen Lee Oswald flee the TSBD fifteen minutes after the shooting, and escape with a second man in a Nash Rambler. Such an escape smacked of conspiracy—and the Commission was having none of that."

The Warren Report also denied Craig's account of his conversation with Oswald in Fritz's office:

Captain Fritz stated that a deputy sheriff whom he could not identify did ask to see him that afternoon and told him a similar story to Craig's. Fritz did not bring him into his office to identify Oswald but turned him over to Lieutenant Baker for questioning. If Craig saw Oswald that afternoon, he saw him through the glass windows of the office.

Defenders of the Warren Report have said that Craig either made a sincere mistake in his testimony, or as one writer put it, he was "trying to stir the assassination conspiracy pot".

== Aftermath ==
Following his testimony, Craig found himself under intense scrutiny by his boss, Sheriff Bill Decker, and was ostracized by many of his fellow sheriffs. He was taken out of the field and assigned to the Bond Desk, located adjacent to Decker's office. In November 1964, Craig was contacted by NBC and Jim Kerr of the Dallas Times Herald who were seeking an interview:

Decker told me to tell these people (Jim Kerr and NBC) that I was a Deputy Sheriff—not an actor—and for me to keep my mouth shut. He then went on to say, "Tell them you didn't see or hear anything." He then went back to the papers on his desk and I knew he was through—and so was I. I relayed the message to Jim Kerr, who was very disappointed.... From that day forward Bill Decker began to watch my every move.

In 1965-66, Jack Ruby's sister Eva Grant dropped in regularly at the sheriff's office. She befriended Craig and sought his help in attending to what she perceived as her brother's deteriorating health while he was held in a Dallas jail. Craig's conversations with Grant were a matter of concern to Decker, and Craig was reprimanded for it. He was also rebuked for answering queries from journalists and from assassination researchers. He was meanwhile being commended by critics of the Warren Commission. For example, in the introduction to Mark Lane's 1966 bestseller Rush to Judgment, British historian Hugh Trevor-Roper highlighted Craig's unwavering claim that Oswald, contrary to the Commission's portrayal of a lone gunman, had fled the scene in a getaway car:

Deputy Sheriff Craig gave an important and perhaps illuminating piece of evidence immediately after the assassination. If his evidence had been confirmed, the whole official story would have been suspect from the start. Why was his evidence cut short and dismissed by the police, at that early stage, on the grounds that it "didn't fit with what we knew to be true"—i.e. with the immediate police version of Oswald's movements?

On July 4, 1967, Decker fired Craig. Later that year, Craig was shot at by a sniper while walking to his car in a parking lot at night. The bullet grazed his head.

After leaving the sheriff's department, Craig increasingly sided with JFK assassination conspiracy theorists. In February 1969, he served as a prosecution witness for New Orleans District Attorney Jim Garrison in the trial of Clay Shaw. Craig titled his 1971 autobiographical manuscript, "When They Kill a President". He appeared on radio talk shows to express his views on the JFK assassination. He developed a close friendship with Penn Jones Jr., a Texas-based Warren Commission critic.

In the early 1970s, Craig had several brushes with death. He was injured when a bomb planted in his car exploded as he started the engine. In 1973 a car driven by two men forced Craig's car off a mountain road in West Texas. Craig was badly injured in the crash; he suffered a broken leg, broken back, and was hospitalized for a year. By 1974, his wife left him and he was living in Waxahachie, Texas. In late 1974, he answered a knock at the door and was shot in the shoulder by a stranger.

On May 15, 1975, Craig was found dead in his father's home in Dallas. The cause of death was a gunshot wound from a rifle fired into his upper right chest. A note was discovered that said, "I am tired of all this pain", which was interpreted as a reference to Craig's chronically ailing back, and the pain-killing medication he was taking. His death was ruled a suicide.

A 48-minute documentary film titled Two Men in Dallas was released in 1976. Directed by Lincoln Carle, the film intermixes Mark Lane's investigation of the JFK assassination with an extended interview that Lane conducted with Craig in 1974. In 2016, the Steve Cameron-directed documentary short, "JFK Assassination: The Roger Craig Story", was released to video. It is a condensed version of Two Men in Dallas that only includes the Craig interview.

In the years after his death, Craig's Warren Commission testimony continued to be controversial. It was challenged by those who said it did not hold up to examination, while others argued that he was later vindicated by corroborating evidence.
