= Joan Kelly =

American historian (1928–1982)

- Born: March 29, 1928; New York City, U.S.
- Died: August 15, 1982 (aged 54); New York City, U.S.
- Occupations: Historian, feminist
- Writing career
- Pen name: Joan Kelly-Gadol

Joan Kelly, also known as Joan Kelly-Gadol (March 29, 1928 – August 15, 1982) was a prominent American historian who wrote on the Italian Renaissance, specifically on Leon Battista Alberti. Among her best known works is the essay "Did Women Have a Renaissance?" which was first published in 1976. The article challenged the contemporary historiography of the Renaissance, arguing that women's power and agency declined during the early modern period.

== Personal life ==
Kelly was born in Brooklyn in 1928 to George V. and Ruth (née Jacobsen) Kelly. She received a BA from St John's University in 1953 and then went on to earn a PhD in history from Columbia University in 1963, where she was supervised by Garret Mattingley. Kelly was a member of the history faculty of the City College of New York of the City University of New York from 1956 until her death from cancer in 1982.

Kelly was married to Eugene Gadol until 1972 and to Martin Fleischer from 1979 until her death.

== Career ==
While still a graduate student at Columbia, Kelly was employed as a lecturer for City College from 1956 onwards. Once she received her doctorate in 1963, she was promoted to assistant professor, and again promoted to associate professor in 1972. Kelly was appointed a full professor in 1972.

Her growing political involvement in the 1960s, particularly with Marxist theory and the civil rights movement, led to Kelly becoming more interested in women's history. Together with Gerda Lerner, Kelly founded the first master's program in women's history at Sarah Lawrence College. She was also the chair of the American Historical Association's Committee on Women Historians, 1975–77. From 1973 to 1974, she served as co-chair on the Coordinating Committee for Women in the Historical Profession, as part of the committee's New York City chapter. In addition to these positions, she also sat on the advisory boards for City University of New York's Center for the Study of Women and Sex Roles and their publisher, the Feminist Press. She received a number of awards, including a Woodrow Wilson fellowship, 1953–54 and a junior fellowship from the National Foundation for the Arts and Humanities, 1967–68.

A collection of Kelly's essays, titled Women, History and Theory, was published posthumously in 1984.

== Did Women Have a Renaissance? ==
In the highly influential essay Did Women Have a Renaissance? (1976), Kelly explored women's roles in Renaissance society. She challenged traditional periodization, saying that women's historical experience was different to that of men's, and that while men's options may have expanded during the Renaissance period that the opposite was true for women. Drawing on contemporary literature, Kelly argued that concepts of courtly love led to an increased emphasis on women's passivity and virginity.

Kelly's argument broke with traditional historiography and encouraged other historians of women and gender to reassess historical periodization through the lens of women's experiences.

== Tribute ==
The Joan Kelly Memorial Prize, founded in 1984, is awarded annually by the American Historical Association "for the book in women’s history and/or feminist theory that best reflects the high intellectual and scholarly ideals exemplified by the life and work of Joan Kelly."

== Bibliography ==
- "Did Women Have a Renaissance?" (1977)
- Leon Battista Alberti: Universal Man of the Early Renaissance (1969)
- Households and Kin: Families in Flux (1989)
- Women, History and Theory: The Essays of Joan Kelly (1984)
