= John Howard Griffin =

American journalist (1920–1980)

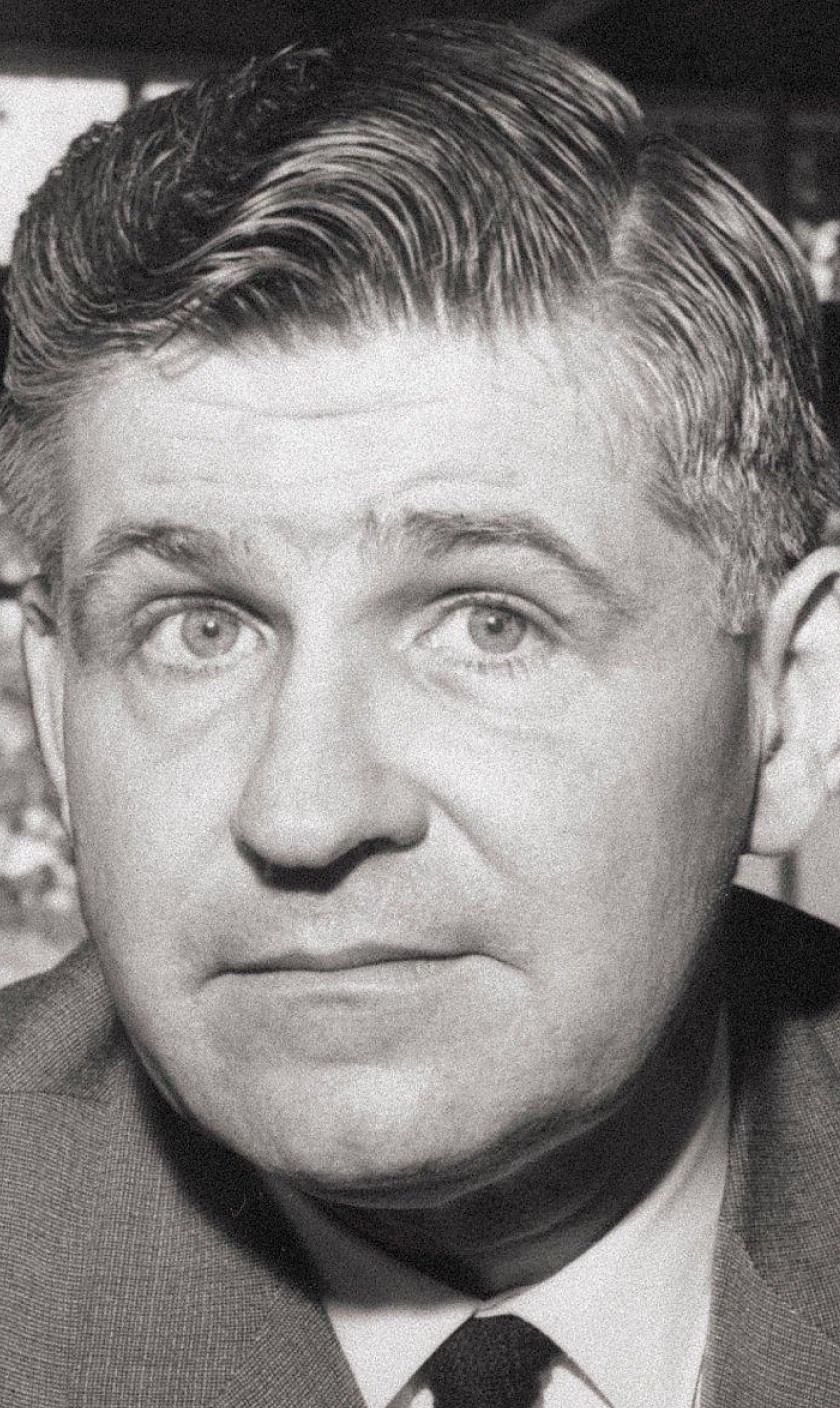
- Griffin c. 1963
- Born: June 16, 1920; Dallas, Texas, U.S.
- Died: September 9, 1980 (aged 60); Fort Worth, Texas, U.S.
- Education: University of Poitiers
- Occupation: Writer
- Notable credit: Black Like Me
- Political party: Democratic
- Spouse: Elizabeth Ann Holland (m. 1953)
- Children: 4

John Howard Griffin (June 16, 1920 – September 9, 1980) was an American journalist and author from Texas who wrote about and championed racial equality. He is best known for his 1959 project to temporarily pass as a black man and journey through the Deep South in order to see life and segregation from the other side of the color line first-hand. He first published a series of articles on his experience in Sepia magazine, which had underwritten the project, then later published an expanded account in book form, under the title Black Like Me (1961). This was later adapted into a 1964 film of the same name. A 50th anniversary edition of the book was published in 2011 by Wings Press.

== Early life ==
Griffin was born in 1920 in Dallas, Texas, to John Walter Griffin and Lena May Young. His mother was a classical pianist, and Griffin acquired his love of music from her. Awarded a musical scholarship, he went to France to study French language and literature at the University of Poitiers and medicine at the École de Médecine. At 19, he joined the French Resistance as a medic, working at the Atlantic seaport of Saint-Nazaire, where he helped smuggle Austrian Jews to safety and freedom in England.

Griffin returned to the United States and enlisted, serving 39 months in the United States Army Air Forces stationed in the South Pacific, during which he was decorated for bravery. He spent 1943–44 as the only European-American on Nuni, one of the Solomon Islands, where he was assigned to study the local culture. He had a bout with spinal malaria that left him temporarily paraplegic.

== Personal life ==
Griffin's first marriage was to a Solomon Islands woman. In 1946, he went slowly blind, the after effect of a severe concussion that he had received from a Japanese bomb. He would remain blind until inexplicably regaining his sight in 1957. A recent study of Griffin's loss of sight, based on a review of published and unpublished sources, presents evidence that Griffin may have feigned blindness.

Griffin returned home to Texas without his wife and converted to Catholicism in 1952, becoming a lay Carmelite. He also taught piano. Griffin gained dispensation from the Vatican for a second marriage. He married one of his students, Elizabeth Ann Holland, and they had four children.

== Early career ==
In 1952, he published his first novel, The Devil Rides Outside, which tells the story of a young American composer who goes to study Gregorian chant in a French monastery.

During the 1940s and 1950s, Griffin wrote a number of essays about his loss of sight and his life, followed by his spontaneous return of sight in 1957. At that point he began to develop as a photographer.

He published Nuni (1956), a semi-autobiographical novel drawing from his year "marooned" in the Solomon Islands. It shows his developing interest in ethnography. He conducted a kind of social study in his 1959 project, resulting in his book Black Like Me (1961).

== Black Like Me ==
In the fall of 1959, Griffin decided to investigate firsthand the plight of African Americans in the South, where racial segregation was legal; blacks had been disenfranchised since the turn of the century and closed out of the political system, and whites were struggling to maintain dominance against an increasing civil rights movement.

Griffin consulted a New Orleans dermatologist for aid in darkening his skin, being treated with a course of drugs, sunlamp treatments, and skin creams. Griffin shaved his head in order to hide his straight hair. He spent six weeks travelling as a black man in New Orleans and parts of Mississippi (with side trips to South Carolina and Georgia), getting around mainly by bus and by hitchhiking. He was later accompanied by a photographer who documented the trip, and the project was underwritten by Sepia magazine, in exchange for first publication rights for the articles he planned to write. These were published under the title Journey into Shame. When he decided to end his journey, in Montgomery, Alabama, he spent three days secluded in a hotel room to avoid the sunlight and stopped taking his skin-darkening medication.

Griffin published an expanded version of his project as Black Like Me (1961), which became a best seller in 1961. He described in detail the problems an African American encountered in the segregated Deep South meeting the needs for food, shelter, and toilet and other sanitary facilities. Griffin also described the hatred he often felt from white Southerners he encountered in his daily life—shop clerks, ticket sellers, bus drivers, and others. He was particularly shocked by the curiosity white men displayed about his sexual life. He also included anecdotes about white Southerners who were friendly and helpful.

The wide publicity about the book made Griffin a national celebrity for a time. The book had several editions. In a 1975 essay included in later editions of the book, Griffin recalled encountering hostility and threats to him and his family in his hometown of Mansfield, Texas. Someone hanged his figure in effigy. He eventually moved his family to Mexico for about nine months before they returned to Fort Worth.

The book was adapted as a 1964 film of the same name, starring James Whitmore as Griffin, and featuring Roscoe Lee Browne, Clifton James and Will Geer. A 50th anniversary edition of the book was published in 2011 by Wings Press.

== Later life ==
Griffin continued to lecture and write on race relations and social justice during the early years of the Civil Rights Movement. In 1964, he received the Pacem in Terris Award from the Davenport (Iowa) Catholic Interracial Council for his contributions to racial understanding. In 1964, Griffin was beaten by the Ku Klux Klan. In 1975, Griffin was severely beaten by the Ku Klux Klan, but survived.

In his later years, Griffin focused on researching his friend Thomas Merton, an American Trappist monk and spiritual writer whom he first met in 1962. Griffin was chosen by Merton's estate to write the authorized biography of Merton, but his health (he had been diagnosed with type 2 diabetes) prevented him from completing this project. He concentrated on Merton's later years.

He wrote the preface to his friend Penn Jones Jr.'s 1966 book, Forgive My Grief, which critiqued the Warren Commission.

== Death ==
Griffin died in Fort Worth, Texas, on September 9, 1980, at the age of 60, from complications of diabetes. He was survived by his wife Elizabeth Ann Griffin and children. He was buried in the cemetery in his birthplace of Mansfield, Texas. After her death, Elizabeth was also buried there, although she had remarried.

There have been persistent rumors that Griffin died of skin cancer, which purportedly developed from his use of large doses of methoxsalen (Oxsoralen) in 1959 to darken his skin for his race project. Griffin did not have skin cancer but he did experience temporary and minor symptoms from taking the drug, especially fatigue and nausea.

== Legacy ==
=== Posthumous works ===
Griffin's nearly finished portion of the biography of Thomas Merton, which covered Merton's later years, was posthumously published in paperback by Latitude Press in 1983 as Follow the Ecstasy: Thomas Merton, the Hermitage Years, 1965–1968.

Griffin's essays about his blindness and recovery were collected and published posthumously as Scattered Shadows: A Memoir of Blindness and Vision (2004).

In recognition of the 50th anniversary of the publication of Black Like Me, Wings Press published a new edition. It also published updated editions of Griffin's other works, including his first novel, The Devil Rides Outside.

=== Secondary studies ===
- Robert Bonazzi wrote a biographical memoir of Griffin: Man in the Mirror: John Howard Griffin and the Story of Black Like Me (1997). Bonazzi had published other works by Griffin at his Latitudes Press. In 2018, TCU Press published Bonazzi's Reluctant Activist: The Spiritual Life and Art of John Howard Griffin.
- Uncommon Vision: The Life and Times of John Howard Griffin is a film documentary released in 2011 in commemoration of the 50th anniversary of his influential book. Directed and produced by Morgan Atkinson, it was aired on PBS stations. The film is also included as an extra on the 2013 DVD release of the film Black Like Me.

== Works ==
- The Devil Rides Outside (1952)
- Nuni (1956)
- Land of the High Sky (1959)
- Black Like Me (1961)
- Preface to Jones Jr., Penn (1966). Forgive My Grief.
- The Church and the Black Man (1969)
- A Hidden Wholeness: The Visual World of Thomas Merton (1970)
- Twelve Photographic Portraits (1973)
- Jacques Maritain: Homage in Words and Pictures (1974)
- A Time to be Human (1977)
- The Hermitage Journals: A Diary Kept While Working on the Biography of Thomas Merton (1981)
- Scattered Shadows: A Memoir of Blindness and Vision (2004), posthumous collection of essays from the 1940s and 1950s
- Available Light: Exile in Mexico (2008), autobiographical texts of the period during which he writes the essay 'black like me'
- Prison of Culture: Beyond Black Like Me (2011), companion volume to the 50th-anniversary of Black Like Me.

== Parallel exercises ==
- Ray Sprigle, a Pulitzer Prize-winning white journalist from the Pittsburgh Post-Gazette, disguised himself in 1948 as a black man and traveled in the Deep South for a month with prominent black Atlanta political leader John Wesley Dobbs, a guide and host provided by the NAACP. Sprigle wrote a 21-part nationally syndicated series of articles under the title "I Was a Negro in the South for 30 Days" that formed the basis of Sprigle's 1949 book In the Land of Jim Crow. 30 Days a Black Man (Lyons Press, 2017) by journalist Bill Steigerwald details Sprigle's undercover mission and the stir it created in the media in 1948.
- Grace Halsell, a white female journalist, also Texan, who, inspired by Griffin, disguised herself as black in a similar manner. Shortly after the April 1968 assassination of Martin Luther King Jr., she left her position on President Lyndon B. Johnson's White House staff for the journey she described as "embracing the Other". She published her account the next year as Soul Sister: The Story of a White Woman Who Turned Herself Black and Went to Live and Work in Harlem and Mississippi. She undertook many similar immersive disguises throughout her career.
- Günter Wallraff, a white German undercover journalist who often immersed himself in parts to reveal the treatment of others (an alcoholic, a worker in a chemicals factory, a homeless person), and released the 2009 documentary Black on White, showing how he was treated in Germany while undercover as a black man.
