= Runcie =

Runcie is a surname. Notable people with the surname include:

- Constance Faunt Le Roy Runcie, American pianist and composer
- James Runcie (born 1959), English novelist and playwright
- Robert Runcie, English archbishop
- Rosalind Runcie, English pianist
