= Lowest of the Low =

Lowest of the Low may refer to:

- The Lowest of the Low, a Canadian alternative rock group
- Lowest of the Low (book), a book by Günter Wallraff about Turks living in Germany
- Lowest of the Low (EP), an EP by American band Terror
