= Undercover Teacher =

2005 British documentary

Undercover Teacher is a 2005 documentary in the Dispatches series for Channel 4, in which Alex Dolan, a journalist and science teacher, went undercover for six months as a supply teacher in British schools. Undercover Teacher was intended to expose the poor behaviour of children in some areas of the secondary education system by secretly filming classes.

Dolan was suspended from teaching for one year by the General Teaching Council because she 'breached students' trust'. The decision has received criticism from both teachers and commentators.

== Summary ==
In February 2005, the supply teacher taught for one week at Intake High School Arts College (now Leeds West Academy). The school had failed its Ofsted inspection in 2004, and faced closure under special measures. One individual science class had had 26 supply teachers since September. Teachers faced regular verbal abuse. During two-day inspections, around twenty of the most disruptive children were taken out of school. Schools are inspected every six years. The supply teacher visited the John Smeaton High School, now John Smeaton Academy. The children verbally abused the teacher and climbed over tables. In the staff room, teachers confide that in each class 'there are three or four good kids, but the rest are disruptive'. The school had sent people to good universities, but in recent years it now no longer taught 'academic A-levels'. Two disruptive nearby schools had closed, East Leeds and Copperfields, and the disruptive children now attended the John Smeaton school. Parents had moved their children away from the school, to schools to the east of Leeds. One in three children, at the school, had known difficulties.

Robert Coe of Durham University was interviewed. Ofsted found that one in ten secondary schools were disruptive. The supply teacher visited Highbury Grove School in Islington (now called City of London Academy Highbury Grove), which described itself as an 'improving and effective school'. But lessons were highly disruptive, with zero discipline. In many classes, around three or four children wanted to work, and the rest did not. Teachers did not get much time to teach in such routinely chaotic classes. Children were not given sufficient disciplinary boundaries. Around a third of children had known difficulties, known as 'disaffected'. Jodie Reid of the IPPR. Chris Woodhead said that the government's only solution was to 'spread the misery', which he said could 'destroy a school'.

The supply teacher lastly visited St Aloysius' College, Highgate, a Roman Catholic school in Islington. The school had transformed from 30% good GCSEs to 49% in 2004. School discipline was largely exemplary, and much teaching occurred. The school operated zero tolerance, and the children realised this. The school would frequently exclude anyone being difficult, but the children understood this consequence. The Labour government conversely wanted to reduce exclusions at school. The school sat the GNVQ science exam, which could artificially enhance league tables. Many schools that had claimed to have much improved GCSE results sat the GNVQ. The documentary concludes that unless the groundwork is done first - the 'ABC' of discipline - any great teaching is going to be uphill.

The documentary was narrated by Simon Chadwick, produced by Allen Jewhurst, directed by Lynn Ferguson, and made by Chameleon Television.

== See also ==
- Ofsted
