= Stephen Perse Foundation =

Coordinates: 52°11′49″N 0°7′33″E

The Stephen Perse Foundation

Location
- Union Road; Cambridge, Cambridgeshire, CB2 1HF; England

Information
- Type: Public School; Private school
- Motto: L’esprit de son âge
- Established: 1881
- Principal: Stephen Ward
- Affiliation: Non-denominational
- Website: stephenperse.com
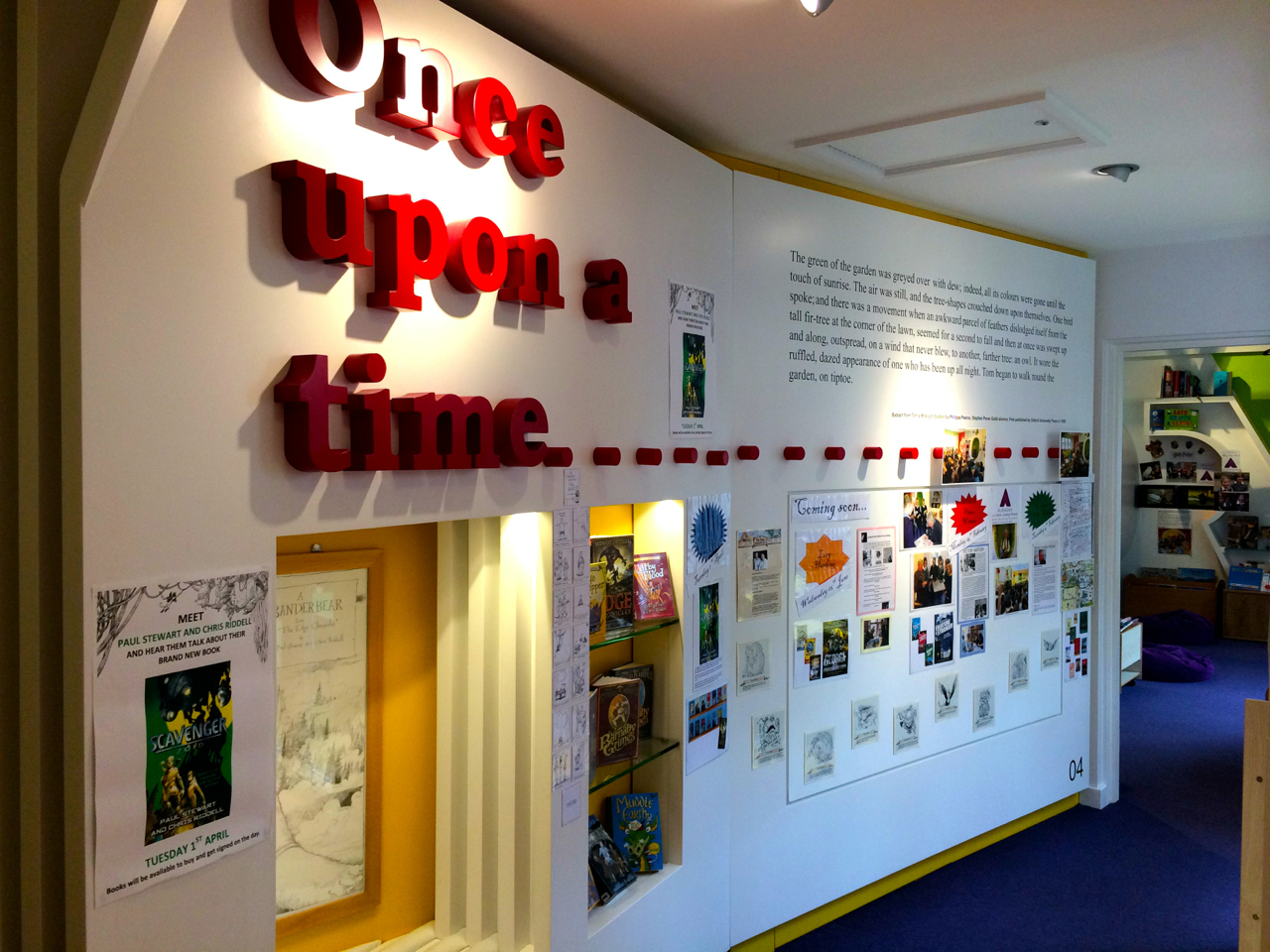
- Stephen Perse Foundation Junior School library

Stephen Perse Cambridge (legally The Stephen Perse Foundation) is a family of co-educational independent schools in Cambridge and Saffron Walden, educating pupils aged 10 months to 18 years. It consists of several nurseries, junior schools, a senior school, and a sixth form.

The Foundation is a registered charity under English law.

== History ==
The school was founded in 1881 as the Perse School for Girls. Born out of the 19th century movement to expand educational opportunities for women, it was created as a companion to the original boys' grammar school, known today as The Perse School. It was funded in part from a portion of the original endowment for the boys' school from Dr Stephen Perse, a philanthropist and Fellow of Gonville & Caius College, Cambridge.

The Perse School for Girls officially opened on 17 January 1881 at 68 Trumpington Street, Cambridge, moving shortly afterwards to Panton House on Union Road, where Stephen Perse Cambridge Senior School remains today.

In its early years, the school opened its kindergarten to boys as well as girls, most notably a young John Maynard Keynes.

Writer and cartoonist Ronald Searle drew from the Perse School for Girls and the Cambridgeshire High School for Girls (now Long Road Sixth Form College) as inspiration for his St Trinian's School books (published 1946 to 1952), which portrayed the girls at a boarding school as juvenile delinquents. He donated original manuscripts and diaries to Stephen Perse Cambridge, which are held in the school archive. This material includes a letter, dated 5th July 1993, which confirms the link.

To reflect it's growing family of schools, the Perse School for Girls was renamed The Stephen Perse Foundation in 2008 and, soon after, began admitting boys in both the Junior School and Sixth Form. It became fully co-educational across all its schools in 2017. In September 2013, Dame Bradbury's School in Saffron Walden (founded in 1522 by Dame Johane Bradbury) joined the group. In 2018, the Cambridge Centre for Sixth Form Studies (CCSS) merged into the Stephen Perse Cambridge Sixth Form.

== Awards and recognition ==
In 2013, The Sunday Times named the Foundation the International Baccalaureate (IB) School of the Year for the second time. That year the school was reported as holding the joint-highest IB results in the world, with a student average score of 42.2 points. In 2018, the average IB points score was 36, as reported in the Sunday Times Parent Power Survey ranking.

In November 2014, the school was awarded the title Independent School of the Year 2014 and also "Outstanding Strategic Initiative" by the Independent School Awards, decided by a panel of independent judges, including the Chief Inspector of the Independent Schools Inspectorate, Christine Ryan.

In November 2016, the Foundation was named the Best Independent School in East Anglia by The Sunday Times on its 'Parent Power' list. The list is acknowledged as the 'most authoritative survey' of the county's best schools, according to the newspaper. The Foundation was ranked at number 18 in a list of 2,000 schools around the United Kingdom. The accolade was based on GCSE and A Level results – 97.6% of A Level students achieved A* to B grades and 86.1% of GCSE students achieved A* and A grades. In 2017, The same Parent Power survey ranked the school number 40 in the UK and, in 2018, number 74.

The Foundation was shortlisted for Digital innovation/ed tech school of the year at the TES Schools Awards 2017.

In 2020 the Senior School received the Sunday Times Schools Guide 2021 award for East Anglia Independent Secondary School of the Decade.

The school was featured by BBC News in 2014 regarding the innovatory use of iTunes U courses.

== Sites and facilities ==
Senior School (ages 11-16): occupies a city block, three sides bordered by residential streets and the fourth by the University of Cambridge Department of Chemistry, with an adjacent Visual Arts Centre and Fitness Suite.

Sixth Form (ages 16-18): occupies several buildings on a single campus on Bateman Street, St Eligius Street and Brookside, Cambridge.

Junior Schools: the Stephen Perse Cambridge Junior School (ages 4-11) is on Shaftesbury Road, Cambridge and Dame Bradbury's School (ages 2-11) is located on Ashdon Road, Saffron Walden.

Early Years (ages 10 months - 4 years): comprises nurseries on Station Road and Shaftesbury Road in Cambridge, and another in the nearby village of Madingley.

Sports Facilities: The Stephen Perse Cambridge Sports Ground is located on Latham Close, Cambridge and includes a nature reserve and jetty on the River Cam.

== Notable alumni ==
- Margery Allingham (1904–1966), writer
- Anne Atkins, novelist, broadcaster and journalist
- Bolanle Awe, (b. 1933), pioneer of feminist history and decolonisation
- Anna Bidder (1903–2001), zoologist and co-founder of Lucy Cavendish College, Cambridge
- Vicki Butler-Henderson (b. 1972), racing driver and TV presenter
- Prof Christine Carpenter (b. 1946), historian, Cambridge University
- Olive Cook (1912–2002), writer and artist
- Stephanie Cook (b. 1972), modern pentathlete, 2000 Olympic gold medallist
- Anastasia de Waal, head of family and education at Civitas
- Imogen Grant, Olympic Gold Medal Rower
- Christine Hamill (1923–1956), mathematician
- Jacquetta Hawkes (1910–1996), archaeologist and writer
- Lucy Hawking (b. 1970), journalist and novelist
- Miriam Hodgson (1938–2005), editor of children's books
- Sharon Hunt (b. 1977), equestrian and 2008 Olympic medal-winner
- Bridget Kendall (b. 1956), BBC diplomatic correspondent
- Helen King (police officer) (b. 1965), Principal of St Anne's College, Oxford and senior police officer
- Nicola Lindsay, novelist, broadcaster and actor
- Sarah Martins da Silva, gynaecologist and scientist
- Patience Moberly (1923-2017), English paediatrician, known for her work with the charity Medical Aid for Palestinians
- E. Jennifer Monaghan, reading educator and historian of literary education
- Philippa Pearce (1920–2006), children's author
- Jean Rhys (1890–1979), author, known for Wide Sargasso Sea
- Angela Rumbold (b. 1932), politician
- Rosalind Runcie, pianist and wife of the Archbishop of Canterbury
- Roz Savage, Liberal Democrat MP for South Cotswolds 2024-
- Phyllis Starkey (b. 1947), MP, biomedical researcher
- Meriol Trevor (1919–2000), writer
- Barbara Wootton (1897–1988), economist, sociologist, Labour politician
- Richarda Morrow-Tait (1923–1982), aviator, first woman to fly around the Earth

== See also ==
- The Perse School
