= Sarah Martins Da Silva =

Scientist

Sarah Martins Da Silva FRCOG
- Education: University of Edinburgh
- Awards: The BBC 100 Women of 2019
- Scientific career
- Fields: Fertility; Reproductive medicine
- Workplaces: University of Dundee; Ninewells Hospital
- Website: www.dundee.ac.uk/people/sarah-martins-da-silva

Sarah Martins da Silva is a British gynaecologist and researcher specialising in male infertility. Martins da Silva is a Clinical Reader in reproductive medicine at the University of Dundee. She also works as an honorary consultant gynaecologist at Ninewells Hospital in Dundee, specialising in fertility problems and assisted conception. She was named one of the BBC's "100 Women of 2019" for her contribution to fertility science.

== Early life and education ==
Martins da Silva was born and raised near Cambridge, England. Her father was an engineer and her mother was engaged in charity work. From a young age, she aspired to become a doctor and scientist.

Martins da Silva attended the Perse School for Girls in Cambridge from 1978 to 1990. In 1995, she received a Bachelor of Medicine, Bachelor of Surgery (MBChB) from the University of Edinburgh Medical School. In 2001, Martins da Silva qualified with a Diploma of the Faculty of Family Planning (DFFP) from the Royal College of Obstetricians and Gynaecologists, Faculty of Sexual and Reproductive Healthcare. In 2007, Martins da Silva received an M.D. from University of Edinburgh Medical School where her residency was in obstetrics and gynaecology. Martins da Silva's doctoral thesis was titled "Activin and Neurotrophin Regulation of Human Follicular Development and Bovine Oocyte Maturation" and investigated egg cell maturation and the development of the ovaries. Her advisor was Richard Anderson. In 2008 she qualified with a Diploma in Obstetric Ultrasound from Royal College of Obstetricians and Gynaecologists / Royal College of Radiologists and also received her MRCOG there. Martins da Silva was awarded FRCOG in 2021.

== Career ==
From 2000 to 2004, Martins da Silva was a clinical lecturer at the MRC Centre for Reproductive Health at the University of Edinburgh School of Medicine. From 2004 to 2011, she worked as a specialist registrar in the obstetrics and gynaecology division of the Royal Infirmary of Edinburgh within NHS Lothian.

From 2011 to 2013, Martins da Silva was a Scottish Clinical Research Excellence Development Scheme (SCREDS) Clinical Lecturer in reproductive medicine at the University of Dundee School of Medicine. From 2013 to 2019, Martins da Silva was a consultant gynaecologist and honorary senior lecturer at Ninewells Hospital at NHS Tayside in Dundee, Scotland.

In 2021, Martins da Silva became Clinical Reader in reproductive medicine and an honorary Consultant Gynaecologist at the University of Dundee School of Medicine.

In addition to her research in sperm count and function, Martins da Silva is a consultant gynecologist and fertility specialist, including in the area of freezing eggs.

In 2019, Martins da Silva featured in a BBC documentary on fertility issues and IVF. She delivered a speech highlighting the problem of decreasing sperm counts at the BBC 100 Women event in Delhi, India.

== Research ==
Martins da Silva leads a research group on male infertility, sperm biology and drug discovery. She is the lead on a UK-wide research clinic on sperm studies for couples affected by unexplained infertility post-IVF treatment. Da Silva has published scientific papers predominantly focussing on human fertility.

Martins da Silva's work on male infertility was motivated by the unexplained decrease in male fertility in the late 20th and early 21st centuries. During her work as a consultant gynaecologist specialising in fertility problems and assisted conception, she noticed that treatment options for male fertility were limited, instead requiring the female partner to undergo invasive fertility treatments such as in-vitro fertilisation (IVF) and intracytoplasmic sperm injection that did not directly address the problem of low male fertility. Martins da Silva's research investigates the functionality of sperm cells, particularly the sperm-specific calcium channel CatSper, and how modern lifestyle choices may affect sperm function. She is working on developing drugs to enhance sperm count and function, for which she has won funding from the Bill & Melinda Gates Foundation. Martins da Silva helped create a high-throughput system for screening many potential drugs, an approach which led to the discovery of two compounds that were able to enhance sperm motility in laboratory tests.

== Personal life ==
Martins da Silva married fellow medic Mauricio Martins da Silva in 2000. They met while studying at the University of Edinburgh. They have three children.

== Honors ==
- 2019: Glasgow Times, Scotswoman of the Year Award, finalist
- 2019: BBC, 100 Women 2019

== Selected works and publications ==
- da Silva, S.J.Martins; Bayne, R.A.L; Cambray, N; Hartley, P.S; McNeilly, A.S; Anderson, R.A (February 2004). "Expression of activin subunits and receptors in the developing human ovary: activin A promotes germ cell survival and proliferation before primordial follicle formation". Developmental Biology. 266 (2): 334–345. doi:10.1016/J.YDBIO.2003.10.030. hdl:20.500.11820/d5a97cec-4c60-4ad8-a49e-ef491f5bc42b. PMID 14738881. Wikidata ()
- Martins Da Silva, Sarah Justine (2007). Activin and Neurotrophin Regulation of Human Follicular Development and Bovine Oocyte Maturation (PhD). University of Edinburgh. hdl:1842/24911. OCLC 1065314574.
- Tardif, Steve; Madamidola, Oladipo A.; Brown, Sean G.; Frame, Lorna; Lefièvre, Linda; Wyatt, Paul G.; Barratt, Christopher L.R.; Martins Da Silva, Sarah J. (10 October 2014). "Clinically relevant enhancement of human sperm motility using compounds with reported phosphodiesterase inhibitor activity". Human Reproduction. 29 (10): 2123–2135. doi:10.1093/HUMREP/DEU196. PMC 4481575. PMID 25124668. Wikidata ()
- Williams, Hannah L.; Mansell, Steven; Alasmari, Wardah; Brown, Sean G.; Wilson, Stuart M.; Sutton, Keith A.; Miller, Melissa R.; Lishko, Polina V.; Barratt, Christopher L.R.; Publicover, Steven J.; Martins Da Silva, Sarah (8 October 2015). "Specific loss of CatSper function is sufficient to compromise fertilizing capacity of human spermatozoa". Human Reproduction. 30 (12): 2737–46. doi:10.1093/HUMREP/DEV243. PMC 4643530. PMID 26453676. Wikidata ()
- Brown, Sean G.; Publicover, Stephen J.; Mansell, Steven A.; Lishko, Polina V.; Williams, Hannah L.; Ramalingam, Mythili; Wilson, Stuart M.; Barratt, Christopher L.R.; Sutton, Keith A.; Da Silva, Sarah Martins (June 2016). "Depolarization of sperm membrane potential is a common feature of men with subfertility and is associated with low fertilization rate at IVF". Human Reproduction. 31 (6): 1147–1157. doi:10.1093/HUMREP/DEW056. PMC 4871192. PMID 27052499. Wikidata ()
- Martins Da Silva, Sarah J.; Brown, Sean G.; Sutton, Keith; King, Louise V.; Ruso, Halil; Gray, David W.; Wyatt, Paul G.; Kelly, Mark C.; Barratt, Christopher L.R.; Hope, Anthony G. (May 2017). "Drug discovery for male subfertility using high-throughput screening: a new approach to an unsolved problem". Human Reproduction. 32 (5): 974–984. doi:10.1093/HUMREP/DEX055. PMC 5850465. PMID 28333338. Wikidata ()
- Martins Da Silva, Sarah J. (December 2019). "Male infertility and antioxidants: one small step for man, no giant leap for andrology?". Reproductive BioMedicine Online. 39 (6): 879–883. doi:10.1016/J.RBMO.2019.08.008. PMID 31727498. Wikidata ()
- Pacey, Allan; Martins Da Silva, Sarah (May 2020). "Chapter 6 - The Effect of Age on Male Fertility and the Health of Offspring". In Aitken, John; Mortimer, David; Kovacs, Gabor (eds.). Male and Sperm Factors that Maximize IVF Success. Cambridge, UK and New York: Cambridge University Press. pp. 73–82. doi:10.1017/9781108762571.006. ISBN 978-1-108-76257-1. OCLC 1120784106. S2CID 219788346.
