= Roar (2006 TV series) =

British television series

- Presented by: Katie Phillips
- Country of origin: United Kingdom
- No. of series: 5
- No. of episodes: 140 + 40 furry facts and 20 reversions

Production
- Running time: 30 minutes

Original release
- Network: BBC Two
- Release: 4 September 2006 – 2014

Roar is a programme broadcast on CBBC, in the UK, for children. It is presented by Rani Price and Johny Pitts.

== Format ==
It is about the animals and keepers at Howletts Zoo and Port Lympne Zoo Wild Animal Parks. It is similar to another BBC series, Animal Park, filmed at Longleat Safari Park.

== Roar: The Game ==
There is also a Roar game on the CBBC website, the 2010 version of which was developed by digital agency Fish in a bottle. In every Roar broadcast they give you a passcode to unlock a treat or animal for their game.

== Presenters ==
=== Presenters ===
- Alex Dolan (2006)
- Matthew Skilton (2006–2009)
- Rani Price (2007–11)
- Johny Pitts (2009–11)
- Katie Phillips (2012–14)

== Series ==
No.	Presenters	Where	First aired	Finished airing	No. of episodes	Notes
1	Alex Dolan and Matthew Skilton	Howletts and Port Lympne	4 Sept 2006	3 Nov 2006	50	55 mins
Furry Facts	Alex Dolan or Matthew Skilton	Howletts and Port Lympne			40	Spin-off – 4 mins
2	Rani Price and Matthew Skilton	Howletts and Port Lympne	24 Sept 2007	16 Nov 2007	40	60 mins
Reversions	Rani Price and Matthew Skilton	Howletts and Port Lympne	14 Apr 2008	18 Aug 2008	20	30 mins
3	Rani Price and Matthew Skilton	Howletts and Port Lympne	17 Nov 2008	19 Dec 2008	25	57 mins
4	Rani Price and Matthew Skilton	Howletts and Port Lympne	23 Feb 2009	27 Mar 2009	25	57 mins
5	Rani Price and Johny Pitts	Howletts and Port Lympne	8 Mar 2010		35	28 mins
6	Rani Price and Johny Pitts	Longleat Safari Park	1 Mar 2011		35	28 mins
7	Rani Price and Johny Pitts	Longleat Safari Park			35	28 mins
8	Rani Price and Johny Pitts	Longleat Safari Park	31 Oct 2011		35	28 mins

The series consisted of daily visits to all sections of the parks.

Roar: The Game was introduced during series 1 and was renamed Roar – 2010 Edition during Series 5. From series 6 a new addition called 'feeding time' was introduced. Cheat codes were given out during the episodes to access content on the website.

=== Roar – Reversions ===
Rani Price and Matthew Skilton with stories from Howletts and Port Lympne wild animal parks. This series aired from April 2008 and finished airing its 20 episodes in August 2008. In this series it contains the best moments of Roar from series 1 and 2. It is presented by Rani Price and Matthew Skilton.
