= Johny Pitts =

English television presenter, writer and photographer

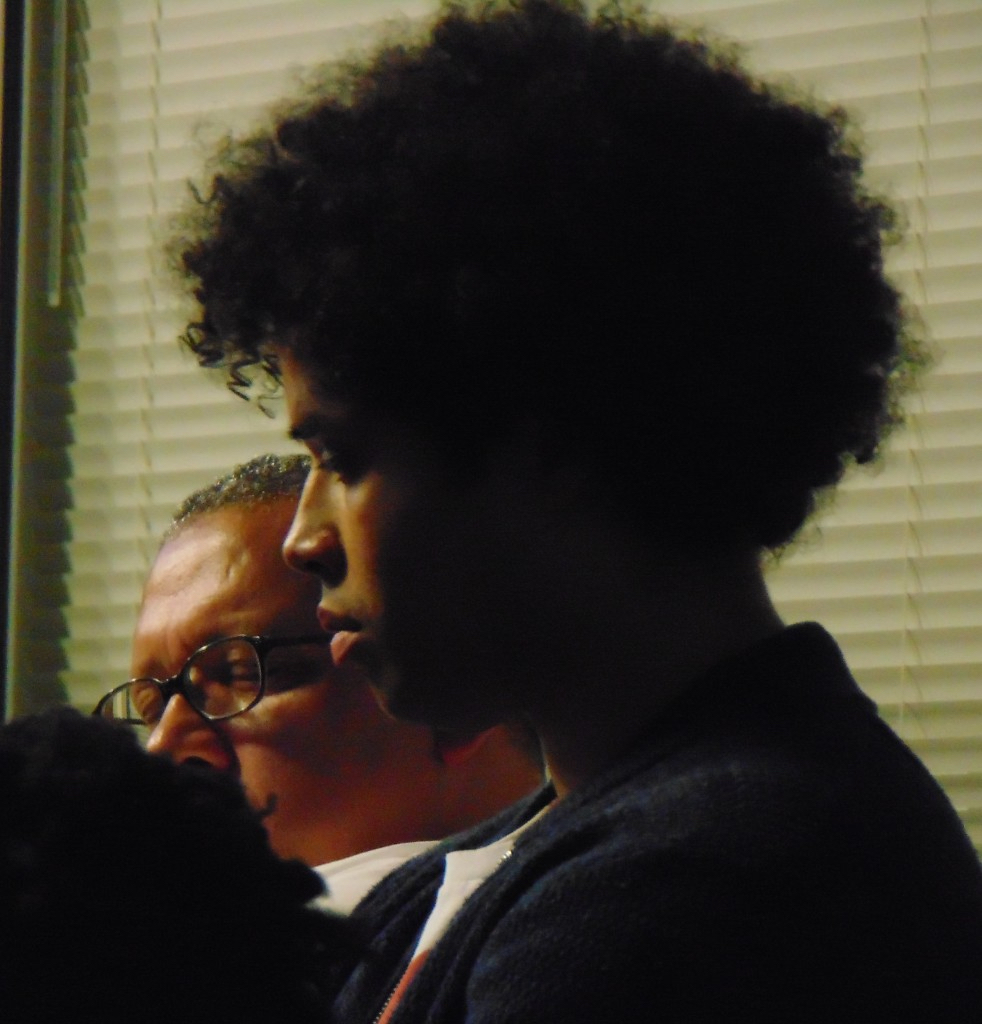
Pitts on the 2016 Breaking Ground Black British Writers US tour.

Johny Pitts is a British writer, photographer and broadcaster from Firth Park, Sheffield.

== Biography ==
Pitts is of mixed-race heritage (his father Richie was from Bedford–Stuyvesant, Brooklyn, New York and was in the 1970s soul band The Fantastics, who had a top 10 hit in 1971 with "Something Old, Something New"), while his mother is English with some Irish ancestry. In 2015, Johny Pitts explored his roots in the 2015 BBC Radio 4 documentary Something Old, Something New, a programme he wrote and presented, which included an interview with his late father and saw Johny travelling to Bedford–Stuyvesant in Brooklyn and Sullivan's Island in South Carolina to trace his father's family. He spent part of his childhood in Japan during the Japanese asset price bubble when his father toured Asia with the musical Starlight Express, an experience which continues to haunt much of his work. He holds US and UK passports and is a Fellow of the Royal Geographical Society.In 2026 he was awarded an Honorary doctorate of letters from the University of Sheffield, and a scholarship from the Daiwa Anglo-Japanese Foundation.

=== Writing ===
Pitts began his career as a music journalist writing for Blues & Soul magazine, Straight No Chaser and The Observer, and won the Decibel Penguin Prize for new writers, with his short story "Audience" appearing in the anthology The Map of Me published by Penguin Books. He studied poetry under Debjani Chatterjee and has performed solo and alongside renowned poets John Agard and Valerie Bloom at venues such as the Albany Theatre, the Jazz Café, the Big Chill Festival, Notting Hill Arts Club and the Soho Theatre.

His book Afropean: Notes from Black Europe won the 2020 Jhalak Prize, the 2020 Bread and Roses Award and the 2021 Leipzig Book Award for European Understanding and the European Essay Prize. It is a written documentary of the lives and culture of black communities throughout Europe, exploring the histories of the black diaspora and questioning the challenges and inequalities that black communities still experience in European countries. In academic discourse, Afropean has been examined through the lens of literary journalism, highlighting its blend of reportage and personal narrative in portraying Black European experiences.

=== Music ===
He is a musician and member of the Bare-Knuckle Soul collective, who have supported the likes of Omar, the Pharcyde, Plantlife and Alice Russell and garnered acclaim from Giles Peterson, Zane Lowe and Trevor Nelson, as well as appearing on the Norman Jay Good Times 7 compilation.

=== Television ===
In 2002, Pitts participated in the Channel 4 reality television series Eden in which he lived in an Australian jungle for three months.

He was previously presenter for Escape from Scorpion Island, Roar and All Over the Place, He also had stints on CD:UK, hosting with Lauren Laverne and Myleene Klass, and on Blue Peter and MTV.

In 2019, Pitts lent his voice to Cyril in HISTORY's podcast Letters of Love in WW2 – a series based on the real-life letters of a couple separated by the Second World War.

=== Photography ===
Pitts collaborated with the novelist Caryl Phillips and Art Angel on a photographic essay exploring immigration and the River Thames for the BBC/Arts Council's The Space, and founded the website www.afropean.com, which is part of the Guardian newspaper's "Africa Network", and the ENAR Foundation award-winning "Afropean Culture" page. In 2024, Afropean: A Journal, a visual version of his nonfiction book of the same name, won 'Special Mention' at Rencontres d'Arles Prix du Livre for best artist book.

His photography has been featured on The New York Times Lens Blog and the front covers of the Journal of Postcolonial Writing and Harvard University's Transition Magazine, Essex Honey by Dev Hynes / Blood Orange. A limited-edition photo book 'The Thames Path' was published by Cafe Royal Books.

== Published works ==
- Pitts, John A. (November 2008). "Audience". The Map of Me - true tales of mixed heritage experience. Penguin UK. ISBN 9780141903514.
- The Thames Path. Fotografien. Hrsg. Craig Atkinson. Stockport: Café Royal Books, 2015 (2012).
- Afropean: Notes from Black Europe. Allan Lane, 2019.
  - German edition: Afropäisch : eine Reise durch das schwarze Europa. Übersetzung Helmut Dierlamm. Berlin : Suhrkamp, 2020
- Johny Pitts: Lost in the thick Sheffield fog: Johny Pitts' best photograph, autobiografisch, The Guardian, 18 November 2020.
