= Eden (2002 TV series) =

- Genre: Reality
- Presented by: Vernon Kay
- Narrated by: Kate Brown
- Country of origin: United Kingdom
- Original language: English
- No. of series: 1
- No. of episodes: 39

Production
- Executive producers: David Frank; Shauna Minoprio
- Producers: Kate Brown; Eve Kay
- Running time: 30 minutes
- Production company: RDF Television

Original release
- Network: Channel 4
- Release: 15 January 2002 – April 2002

Related
- I'm a Celebrity...Get Me Out of Here! Back to Reality; Big Brother; Ex on the Beach

Eden is a British reality television series that aired on Channel 4 in Spring 2002. The contestants who were all under 30 had to survive in a remote area of the Australian jungle. The series was filmed in the Greater Port Macquarie region of New South Wales.

== Format ==
Their numbers were augmented each week by a newcomer selected by the viewers. In the latter part of the series the newcomer then had to select candidates for eviction. The contestants were able to receive email from viewers which led to conflict when negative remarks by incoming contestant Romany Paige were reported to their subject.

== Contestants ==
The series was eventually won by one of the six original contestants, Cliona O'Connor.

The only contestants to achieve subsequent recognition have been Crimewatch presenter Rav Wilding who actually quit before the end of the series and Johny Pitts, the only male Edenite to last the duration of the show, who went on to present CD:UK, and then for MTV and CBBC. Pitts returned to Eden in 2013.

== Legacy ==
Although the show did not return for a second series, it did have some influence. I'm a Celebrity...Get Me Out of Here!, first broadcast later in 2002, was set in a similar location and it was the first reality show to send in a contestant's real-life partner to spice up the drama, a device used subsequently in Back to Reality, Big Brother and Ex on the Beach.
