= Anastasia de Waal =

Anastasia de Waal is a British social policy analyst and broadcaster, specialising in family and education. Director of charity I Can Be, de Waal was previously deputy director at think tank Civitas. De Waal is chair of national parenting charity Family Lives.

== Education ==
De Waal was educated at Perse School for Girls, an independent school for girls in the city of Cambridge, followed by Hills Road Sixth Form College and the London School of Economics, where she gained a BSc and MSc in Sociology.

== Life and career ==
De Waal is a qualified primary school teacher. In 2010, she set up the charitable programme Visiting Women at Work, now the charity I Can Be, which takes primary school children to meet professionals in their workplaces.
