= Carmelo Abbate =

Italian journalist and reporter

- Born: 5 August 1971; Castelbuono, Italy
- Occupations: Journalist and reporter

Carmelo Abbate (born 5 August 1971 in Castelbuono, Italy) is an Italian journalist and reporter.

== Biography ==
A professional journalist since 2 February 2004. He works for the weekly Panorama, where he started as a collaborator and today he holds the position of head of the news section. In the past, he held the same job for the cultural section of the weekly. As a reporter he has conducted numerous investigations in the field, in particular regarding social and economic problems: from undeclared work to illegal hiring, from medical malpractice to illegal immigration.

He works for the Italian weekly magazine Panorama, where he began as a collaborator and today he serves as Senior Editor. In the past, he held the same job for the cultural section of the magazine. As an undercover reporter he conducted several major investigations, in particular with regard to social and economic topics, illegal immigration and catholic church scandals such as homosexuality in the Catholic Church, or Catholic priests involved in pedophilia. His book Sex and the Vatican: a secret journey in the reign of the chaste was ignored by most of the mainstream Italian media, but instead became a bestseller in France.

During the 2012/2013 television season, he participated as a commentator in various Rai, Mediaset, Sky and La7 programmes, making his contribution on domestic news, crime news, current affairs and politics. He was a frequent guest on Quarto Grado, hosted by Salvo Sottile and La vita in diretta, hosted by Mara Venier. In the 2013/2014 television season, he was a commentator for the Mediaset networks and a regular guest on Quarto Grado hosted by Gianluigi Nuzzi on Rete 4 and on Segreti e delitti broadcast on Canale 5 in the months of June and July.

In 2011, he published the book Golgota, a secret journey between church and pedophilia. Piemme, 2011: investigative book on the Catholic Church delving into the scandals linked to pedophilia.

His collaboration with the Mediaset networks also continues for the following television seasons. In addition to Quarto Grado, he participates as a regular commentator on Mattino Cinque, Pomeriggio Cinque and Domenica Cinque and since 2019 also with Live-Non è la D'Urso.

In May 2016, he made his debut as a television host with the programme "Il Labirinto - Stories of ordinary injustice", broadcast on Thursdays in the late evening on Rete 4.

On Tuesday, 23 May 2017, Carmelo Abbate, during the programme Mattino Cinque on which he was a guest, gave news of a "celebration" of the Manchester attack of 22 May 2017 in a bar in Pioltello; two days later, in that location, a bar run by North Africans was set on fire. The news given by Abbate was also declared false by the Carabinieri.

In 2018, he launched "Storie Nere", an exceptionally attractive editorial format on its social channels, in which it reacts briefly with specific narrative stresses, the story of cronaca near riguardante sia la gente comune that has famous characters.

== Publications ==
- La Trappola, Milano, Piemme, 2008
- L'onorata società: caste e baroni dell'Italia che lavora, Milano, Piemme, 2009
- Babilonia, Milano, Piemme, 2010
- Sex and the Vatican: viaggio segreto nel regno dei casti, Milano, Piemme, 2011
- Golgota: viaggio segreto tra chiesa e pedofilia, Milano, Piemme, 2012
