= Selim Çürükkaya =

Kurdish activist and writer

Mehmet Selim Çürükkaya (born January 1, 1954), is a founding member and later dissident of the Kurdistan Workers' Party (PKK) and a Kurdish writer and International PEN member. Çürükkaya lives in Germany and has published eight books, one translated into German and English.

== Biography ==
Çürükkaya was born in 1954 in the village of Tanzut, in Bingöl Province. He attended primary school in the village and learned Turkish. After completing primary school, the village was renamed to İkizgöl. After primary school he went to live with an uncle in Ceyhan (in the Province of Adana), in order to visit the middle school. He stopped going to school and worked for a coal merchant and in cafes. In the early 1970s he moved back to Bingol to finish high school. The village was temporarily destroyed by a landslide and elsewhere, 17 km from Bingöl, under the name Yeniköy been rebuilt.

In 1974 Çürükkaya joined the PKK and in the following year, while a student at Tunceli Teachers School, travelled around southeast Turkey recruiting members. He was sentenced in May 1980 by a military court in Diyarbakır to a long prison sentence. In his books he tells of torture and resistance. According to Daniel, he participated in several hunger strikes. His wife Aysel was placed in the same prison. In April 1991 he was released. He left Turkey and went to Mahsum-Korkmaz Academy in the Lebanese Bekaa Valley. He held various functions in the PKK, including as chief financial executive. Çürükkaya fell out with Abdullah Öcalan because of his leadership style and the persecution and murder of intra-party critics. Çürükkaya was arrested on the orders of Ocalan and sentenced to death. He escaped from prison, came to Germany and had to hide from the organization. In Germany, Günter Wallraff sat for him and visited Öcalan in Syrian exile, to effect a pardon Çürükkayas.

In his book on Abdullah Öcalan, Selim claimed that Öcalan was also raping girls, and that he was acting like a sex- and murder machine among young (Kurdish) girls.

Çürükkaya is married to fellow activist Aysel Çürükkaya, with whom he has a daughter.
