= Best of Friends =

British children's game show

- Also known as: Best of Friends Africa
- Genre: Children's Game show
- Created by: Jonathan Wolfson; Mark Robson
- Presented by: Michael Absalom; Rani Khanijau; Ortis Deley
- Country of origin: United Kingdom
- Original language: English
- No. of series: 5 (regular); 1 (Africa)
- No. of episodes: 91 (regular); 5 (Africa)

Production
- Running time: 30 minutes
- Production company: Talent TV

Original release
- Network: CBBC
- Release: 11 March 2004 – 13 August 2008

Best of Friends is a British children's game show that aired on CBBC and ran from 11 March 2004 to 13 August 2008.

== Format ==
=== Tasks and Treats ===
In the show, five friends with a strong friendship must complete a series of three unpleasant tasks in order to win a final treat. The tasks include mucking out pigs, cleaning bins, picking up ice with bare feet, getting your bare feet tickled without laughing or smiling and so on, for the test of friendship. While some members of the group are doing the task, their friends do treats such as visiting animals at the RSPCA, getting a manicure, shopping, going to a football game, going to a theme park etc. They must make decisions deciding on who will do the task and who will do the treat or they can use the "Unlucky Dip".

In later shows, a surprise Twist element was added. It gives the five friends a choice to make, testing their friendship further. This could include one of the friends being chosen as a leader, meaning they will decide who does the next task and treat, answering questions about each other in order to obtain more time on the task or lose time on the treat etc.

=== "The Unlucky Dip" ===
The unlucky dip contains three, two or one blue sweet(s) in a bag. The friends choose a sweet each (without looking) from the bag, and then suck it. The number of children to do the next task, and therefore the number of blue sweets in the bag, will depend on the success of the previous task. The people or person with the blue sweet(s) will have a blue tongue and will be forced to do the task, while the others will do the treat. The first task requires three people and, each time the children pass a task, the number needed to do the next task will reduce. For the final task they have three options: the unlucky dip, volunteer or the whole team can do the task as it is the hardest.

The presenters also have an option of volunteering to do the task. If they do not volunteer, the presenters also do a compulsory Unlucky Dip with each task. The presenter with a blue tongue will be forced to do the task. Occasionally, for the final task both presenters will receive blue sweets, meaning both will be forced to do the task.

== Transmissions ==
Series	Start date	End date	Episodes
1	11 March 2004	31 March 2004	15
2	2 May 2005	20 May 2005	15
Africa	4 July 2005	6 July 2005	5
3	11 July 2006	20 October 2006	20
Special	14 July 2006		1
4	8 January 2008	10 March 2008	20
5	2 April 2008	13 August 2008	20
