= Günter Wallraff =

German writer and journalist

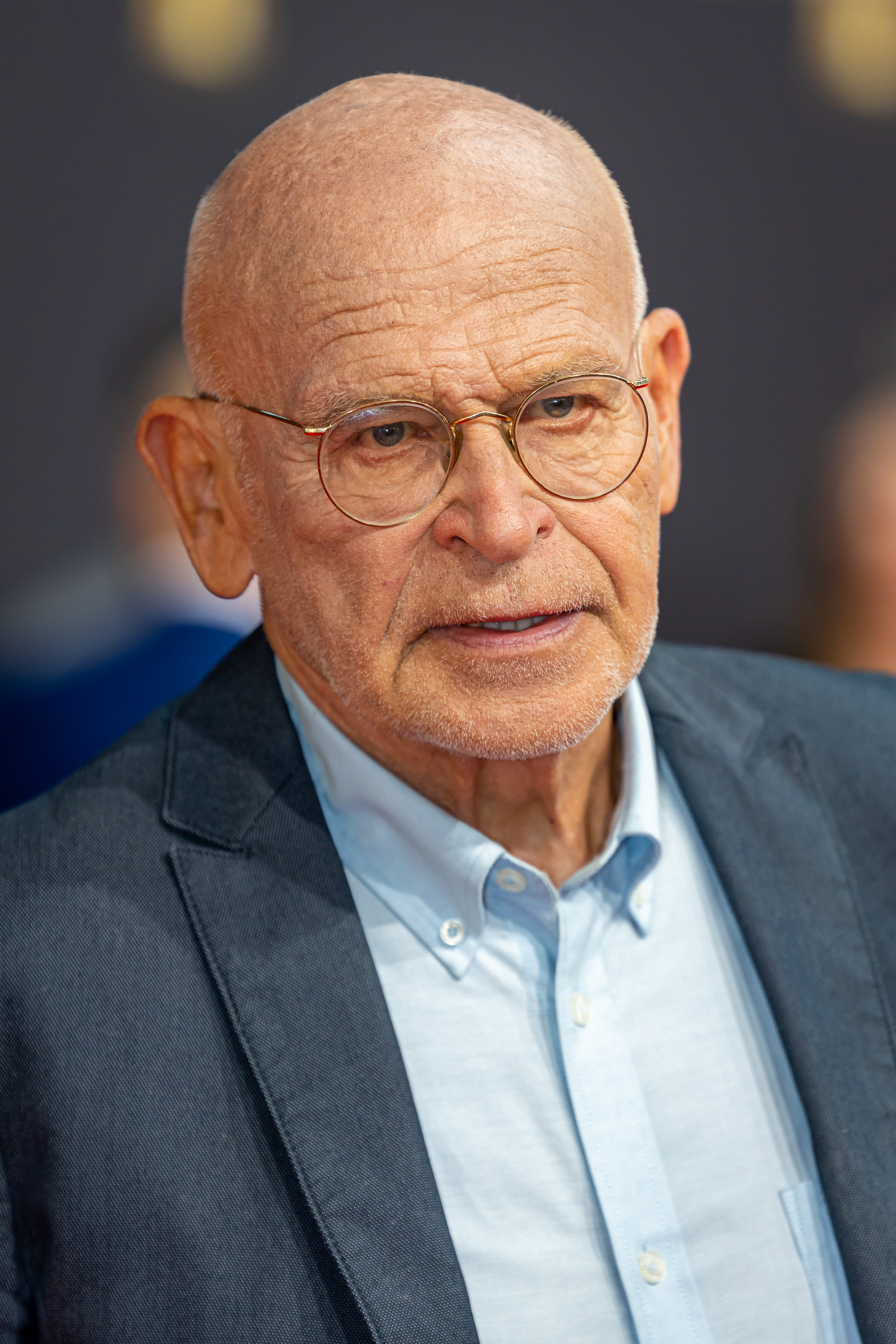
- Wallraff in 2022
- Born: 1 October 1942 (age 84); Burscheid, Germany
- Occupations: Writer, undercover journalist

Günter Wallraff (born 1 October 1942) is a German writer and undercover journalist.

== Life ==
Günther Wallraff was born in Burscheid, the son of a Ford worker and a factory owner's daughter. After attending high school, he trained as a bookseller until 1962. He began writing poetry as early as the 1950s.

Wallraff invoked his constitutional right of conscientious objection against conscription into armed military service, thus leading to being required to carry out alternative civilian service. Having missed the deadline for filing his refusal, he was nevertheless drafted into the Bundeswehr.

Wallraff refused to use weapons in the Bundeswehr. During his time in the Bundeswehr in 1963, he kept a diary about his service. When he announced the publication of the diary, the military leadership offered to release him from his service if he refrained from publishing it. Wallraff rejected this, and was admitted to the psychiatric ward of the Bundeswehr hospital in Koblenz (Bundeswehrzentralkrankenhaus Koblenz). In 1964 he was diagnosed by a military doctor with an "abnormal personality" and "unfit for war and peace" ("untauglich für Krieg und Frieden") and was released from service. In the 1960s, the Bundeswehr was a place where many former Nazi officers served, Wallraff later said.

His experiences from this time were published in 1970 in the anthology "From one who moved out and learned to fear". In this book he processed his time in the psychiatric ward of the Bundeswehr hospital in Koblenz. The involuntary role as a psychiatric patient became a key experience and starting point for his later literary work.

Wallraff described himself as a person with a weak ego. However, this weak ego also accounts for his ability to empathise with others.

From 1966 Walraff was editor of the magazine Pardon, from 1968 on for magazine konkret and from 1973 a freelance author.

Throughout his life, Wallraff repeatedly hosted prominent persecuted artists in his house for a period of time. For example, he hosted Wolf Biermann after his expatriation from the GDR, and Salman Rushdie after he was given a fatwa.

== Research methods ==
Wallraff came to prominence thanks to his striking journalistic research methods and several major books on lower-class working conditions and tabloid journalism. This style of research is based on what the reporter experiences personally after covertly becoming part of the subgroup under investigation. Wallraff would construct a fictitious identity so that he was not recognisable as a journalist.

In the German newspaper Die Zeit in 1977, Walraff formulates a sentence that is central to his work: “If I want to make myself the mouthpiece of the voiceless who have little to say even though they have a lot to say, that means to me that I am one of them, at least temporarily."

== Undercover journalism ==
Wallraff first took up undercover investigative journalism in 1969 when he published 13 unerwünschte Reportagen ("13 undesirable reports") in which he described what he experienced when acting the parts of an alcoholic, a homeless person, and a worker in a chemicals factory.

He travelled to Greece in May 1974 at the time of the Ioannides military dictatorship. While in Syntagma Square, he protested against human rights violations. He was arrested and tortured by the police as he purposely did not carry on him any papers that could identify him as a foreigner. After his identity was revealed, Wallraff was convicted and sentenced to 14 months in jail. He was released in August, after the end of the dictatorship.

In 1977 Wallraff worked for four months as an editor for the tabloid Bild-Zeitung newspaper in Hanover, calling himself "Hans Esser". In his books Der Aufmacher (a pun meaning both "Lead Story" and "the one who opens") and Zeugen der Anklage ("Witnesses for the Prosecution") he portrays his experiences on the editorial staff of the paper and the journalism which he encountered there, which at times displayed contempt for humanity. In 1987 the journalist Hermann L. Gremliza claimed that he, rather than Wallraff, had written parts of Der Aufmacher. The book also formed the basis for the 1990 English-language film The Man Inside, starring Jürgen Prochnow as Wallraff.

Ganz unten ("Lowest of the Low") (1985) documented Wallraff's posing as a Turkish Gastarbeiter, and the mistreatment he received in that role at the hands of employers, landlords and the German government.

In 1986 he was honoured as a Laureate of the International Botev Prize.

In December 1996, Wallraff met with PKK leader Abdullah Öcalan at a Syrian training camp to discuss The Surahs by Kurdish dissident Selim Çürükkaya, who was threatened with death because of this book. Wallraff was warmly received by Öcalan thanks to his role as the Turkish worker "Ali", but failed in getting the murder order overturned. The conversation was printed by Die Zeit.

In January 2003, Russia turned away Wallraff and two other Germans, the former labour minister for the CDU Norbert Blüm and Rupert Neudeck, head of the relief organisation Cap Anamur, as they tried to enter the country to work on a human rights article about Chechnya.

In May 2007, Wallraff announced that he had started yet another undercover journalist work, this time at a German call centre.

During 2009 he wore blackface around Germany in an undercover story to expose latent or explicit racism against black men, releasing the documentary Black on White to show his experiences. Wallraff was criticized by some for this work, including accusations that Wallraff was only interested in earning money from his investigations, or that the method itself was racist.

His investigative methods have led to the creation of the Swedish verb wallraffa, meaning "to expose misconduct from the inside by assuming a role". The word is currently (as of 2023) included in the dictionary Svenska Akademiens Ordlista.

== Responses and repercussions ==
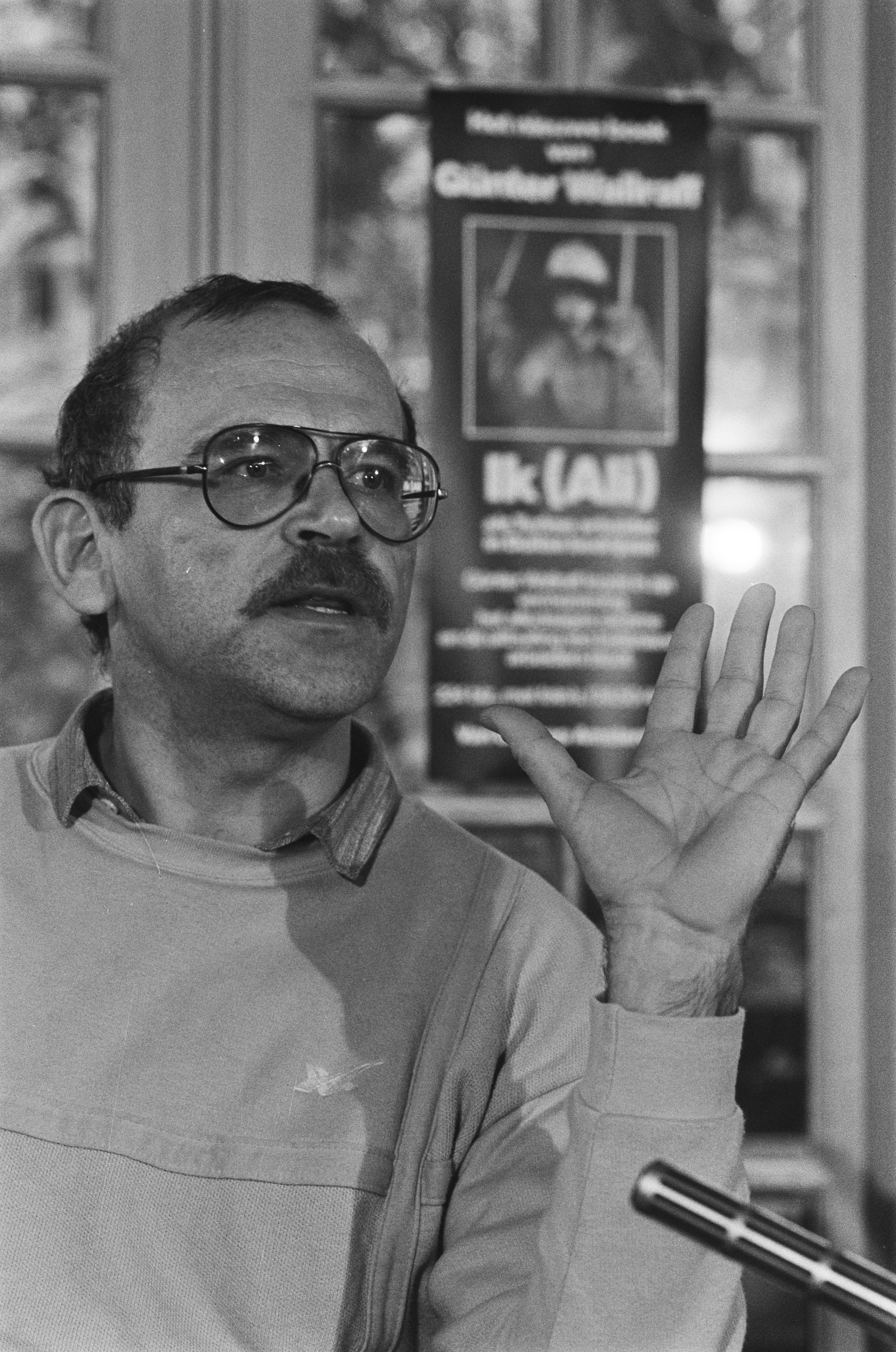
Wallraff in 1985

Wallraff has been heavily criticised by those on the receiving end of his style of investigation, via attempts to frame his work as breaching privacy rights or revealing trade secrets. Attempts were made on a number of occasions to legally prevent Wallraff's investigative methods, but his actions were regularly ruled constitutional by the courts. The courts opined that freedom of the press and public interest in areas concerned with the formation of public opinion favoured Wallraff's actions. In balancing public interest with the competing interests of those immediately affected by his actions it follows however that private conversations, for example, may not be published.

In September 2003, investigations were made by the Stasi Records Agency into the Rosenholz files on Stasi workers which somehow got into the hands of the CIA; as a result, it was claimed that Wallraff had had connections to the Stasi in the 1960s. Wallraff disputes that he ever actively worked for them. On 17 December 2004, the Hamburg district court ruled on a suit brought by Wallraff that he must not be described as an Inoffizieller Mitarbeiter or Stasi collaborator (he was being called this above all in newspapers belonging to the Axel Springer Verlag, the publishers of Bild) as no proof of collaboration could be furnished in the documents which had been presented.

== Honours ==
- 1979 Gerrit-Engelke-Literaturpreis of the city of Hanover
- 1983 Monismanien Prize of Göteborgs Nation and Uppsala University
- 1984 Carl von Ossietzky Medal
- 1985 Literaturpreis der Menschenrechte (France) together with James Baldwin
- 1987 British Academy Award of Film and Television Art
- 1987 French Media Prize Prix Jean d'Arcy for the movie Ganz unten

== Literature ==
- Jürgen Gottschlich (2007): Der Mann, der Günther Walraff ist. Eine Biographie. Verlag Kiepenheuer & Witsch GmbH & Co KG
