= Norah Vincent =

American writer (1968–2022)

- Norah Vincent
- Born: Norah Mary Vincent; September 20, 1968; Detroit, Michigan, U.S.
- Died: July 6, 2022 (aged 53); Switzerland
- Education: Williams College
- Occupations: Journalist, author
- Spouse: Kristen Erickson (divorced)
- Writing career
- Notable work: Self-Made Man

Norah Mary Vincent (September 20, 1968 – July 6, 2022) was an American writer. She was a weekly columnist for the Los Angeles Times and a quarterly columnist on politics and culture for the national gay news magazine The Advocate. She was a columnist for The Village Voice and Salon.com. Her writing appeared in The New Republic, The New York Times, New York Post, The Washington Post and other periodicals. She gained particular attention in 2006 for her book Self-Made Man, detailing her experiences when she lived as a man for eighteen months.

== Early life ==
Norah Mary Vincent was born in Detroit, Michigan, and grew up both there and in London Township where her father was employed as a lawyer for the Ford Motor Company. She attended Williams College, where she graduated with a BA in philosophy in 1990, before undertaking graduate studies at Boston College. She also worked as an editor for Free Press.

== Career ==
=== Self-Made Man ===
Vincent's book Self-Made Man (2006) retells an eighteen-month experiment in the early 2000s in which she disguised herself as a man. This was compared to previous undercover journalism such as Black Like Me. Vincent was interviewed by Juju Chang on the ABC News program 20/20 and talked about the experience in HARDtalk extra on BBC on April 21, 2006, where she described her experiences in male-male and male-female relationships. She joined an all-male bowling club, joined a men's therapy group, went to a strip club, dated women, and used her knowledge as a lapsed Catholic to visit monks in a monastery.

Vincent wrote how the only time she had ever been considered excessively feminine was during her stint as a man. Her alter ego, Ned, was assumed to be gay on several occasions. Features which had been perceived as butch when she was perceived as lesbian were often seen as oddly effeminate when she posed as Ned.

Vincent asserted she fully expected to have more privileges and advantages when posing as a man, but came to realize men face struggles and prejudices she did not previously understand. After the experiment, she more fully realized the benefits of being female and the disadvantages of being male, stating, "I really like being a woman. ... I like it more now because I think it's more of a privilege."

Vincent also stated she had gained more sympathy and understanding for men and the male condition: "Men are suffering. They have different problems than women have but they don't have it better. They need our sympathy, they need our love, and they need each other more than anything else. They need to be together."

=== Voluntary Madness ===
Vincent's book Voluntary Madness (2008) relates her experiences as an inpatient in three institutions for mentally ill patients: "a ward in a public city hospital, a private Midwestern institution, and a pricey New Age clinic." She criticized doctors who she claimed were unapproachable, noting that too many relied on drugs as therapy, while others addressed only symptoms instead of their underlying causes.

Vincent's book also addresses the question of pseudopatients and those who remained ill because of their lack of willingness to cooperate in their therapy.

=== Later work ===
Vincent later wrote two novels: Thy Neighbor (2012), described by The New York Times as "a dark, comic thriller", and Adeline (2015), which imagines the life of Virginia Woolf from when she wrote To the Lighthouse until Woolf's suicide in 1941.

== Personal life, views, and death ==
Vincent was a lesbian, and briefly was married to Kristen Erickson.

Vincent was described as a libertarian who was critical of postmodernism and multiculturalism, and often contrarian. She did not believe “transsexuals were members of the opposite sex” after using surgery or hormones to modify their physical appearance, according to an obituary in The New York Times. In a 2001 article for The Village Voice, Vincent stated her opinion that transgender culture was an outgrowth of ideas promoted by French philosophers like Jacques Derrida and Michel Foucault, which were popular in many American colleges and which she said denied objective reality: “[Transsexuality] signifies the death of the self, the soul, that good old-fashioned indubitable 'I' so beloved of Descartes, whose great adage 'I think, therefore I am' has become an ontological joke on the order of 'I tinker, and there I am.'"

In Voluntary Madness, Vincent details her decade-long history with treatment-resistant depression, saying: "...my brain was never quite the same after I zapped it with that first course of SSRIs." She had a breakdown which she attributed to posing as a man, leading Vincent to admit herself to a locked psychiatric facility. She said the mental health crisis was the price she paid for "the burden of deception".

Vincent died via assisted suicide at a clinic in Switzerland on July 6, 2022, aged 53. Her death was reported in August 2022.

== Publications ==
- The Instant Intellectual – co-written with Chad Conway (Hyperion, 1998)
- Self-Made Man (Viking Adult, 2006)
- Voluntary Madness (Viking Adult, 2008)
- Thy Neighbor (Viking Adult, 2012)
- Adeline: A Novel of Virginia Woolf (Houghton Mifflin Harcourt, 2015)
