= Cambridge Centre for Sixth-form Studies =

Coordinates: 52°11′41.5″N 0°8′4″E

Cambridge Centre for Sixth-Form Studies
- The school logo
- Cambridge, Cambridgeshire; United Kingdom

Information
- Status: Closed
- Closed: 2020
- Age: 15 to 19
- Website: ccss.co.uk (archived)

The Cambridge Centre for Sixth-form Studies (CCSS) was an independent sixth-form college for boarding and day students aged 15 to 19. The college, which was founded in 1980, owned teaching and residential accommodation in the centre of Cambridge, England. It became part of the Stephen Perse Foundation in September 2018 and disappeared as a branded college in March 2020.

== Decline and demise ==
For a number of years prior to its absorption into the Stephen Perse Foundation the college had seen student numbers decline sharply from over 200 to around 135. In response to this fall, the college reduced its staffing, the subjects it offered for study, its extra-curricula activities and closed one of its campuses and its administration block. The college saw a high turnover of staff through redundancies and resignations. These did not cause the hoped for turnaround in the college's financial position and so in 2018 CCSS approached the Stephen Perse foundation to seek admittance. 30 November 2018 was the last day of the college's existence as an independent college.

== Notable alumni ==
=== Politics ===
- James Brokenshire, Conservative politician
- Zac Goldsmith, journalist and Conservative politician
- Charlie Elphicke, former Conservative politician and convicted criminal

=== Literature, TV, music, and drama ===
- Hadley Freeman, newspaper columnist and writer
- Daisy McAndrew, television news journalist
- Zoe Hardman, TV presenter and actress
- Tom Wontner, actor; great-grandson of Arthur Wontner
- Alex Dolan, journalist and weather presenter on BBC's Look East
