= Daisy McAndrew =

British journalist (born 1972)

- Born: Daisy Candida Sampson; 20 May 1972 (age 54); Hampstead, London, England
- Education: Wycombe Abbey School, Buckinghamshire; Cambridge Centre for Sixth-form Studies
- Occupation: Journalist
- Years active: 2003–present
- Notable credit(s): Daily Politics; ITV News
- Spouse: John McAndrew (m. 2005)
- Children: 2
- Website: http://www.daisymcandrew.co.uk/

Daisy Candida McAndrew (née Sampson; born 20 May 1972) is an English journalist.

== Education ==
McAndrew was educated at Wycombe Abbey School, an independent school for girls in High Wycombe, and then at the Cambridge Centre for Sixth-form Studies to pass GCE Advanced Levels in English, Politics and the History of Art.

== Career ==
At the age of 19, McAndrew worked as a researcher in the House of Commons, transferring to The House Magazine which she went on to edit between 1995 and 1997 before becoming a freelance political journalist in the House of Commons Press gallery. In November 1999, McAndrew became a press secretary to the Liberal Democrat Leader, Charles Kennedy.

Following the 2001 general election, McAndrew decided to develop a career in broadcasting, making regular contributions across television and radio and presenting Channel 4's lunchtime political programme, Powerhouse.

In January 2003, using her maiden name, Daisy Sampson, McAndrew came to national prominence as a BBC News presenter co-hosting the weekday lunchtime Daily Politics with Andrew Neil, and presenting Yesterday in Parliament on BBC Breakfast. In 2005, from January to August, she presented the weekday drive-time radio show for London's LBC 97.3.

In September 2005, McAndrew joined ITN as Chief Political Correspondent for ITV News, and in June 2008 became ITV News Economics Editor after returning from maternity leave. She occasionally acted as a newscaster of ITV News weekend bulletins and the ITV Lunchtime News, from 2006 to 2007 and again 2010–2011. In August 2011 she began working under the new title of special correspondent. In December 2012 she left ITN. McAndrew was an occasional news reviewer for the ITV daytime programme This Morning.

In January 2006, it was alleged that McAndrew was responsible for the ITV News story that led to Liberal Democrat Leader Charles Kennedy being forced to reveal that he was a recovering alcoholic. Kennedy's party colleagues chose to capitalise on what was already low-key public knowledge, and this forced his resignation and triggered a leadership election. Having served as Kennedy's personal press secretary, McAndrew's role in this story was widely questioned; some broadcasters and journalists aired the view that she had turned on her former employer, and dubbed her "the blonde assassin".

In February 2007, McAndrew's reporting was questioned, this time by Ofcom. She claimed on air that an interview of Tony Blair by Michael Parkinson revealed that Blair believed God played a role in his decision to go to war in Iraq. ITV was forced to apologise following the ruling.

Since 2013, she has worked for several Television channels as a freelance reporter, journalist and presenter and currently has a British Royal Family Commentator contract with NBC that originated from April 2021.

== Personal life ==
Daisy Sampson is the daughter of the writer and humourist Alistair Sampson.

In August 2005, she married John McAndrew, former editor of The Daily Politics; her husband became Director of News & Programmes at GB News, but reportedly resigned on 16 July 2021. John McAndrew was appointed Director of News Programmes at the BBC in November 2022.

In 2015, the international media development charity Internews announced that she had been appointed to their trustee board in the UK.
