= Alex Dolan =

English weather presenter journalist

Alexandra Marie Dolan is an English weather presenter, and former journalist and science teacher.

== Early life and education ==
Dolan was born in Cuckfield, in West Sussex. She attended The Leys School and Cambridge Centre for Sixth-form Studies, and went on to study marine biology at Newcastle University.

== Career ==
Working as a science teacher, she went undercover for the 2005 Channel 4 documentary Undercover Teacher to expose mismanagement as well as the extent of pupils' bad behaviour. For this, she was suspended from teaching for one year by the General Teaching Council with the claim that she had 'breached student trust'. The decision received criticism from various teachers and commentators.

She was a presenter on BBC's Roar, and Sky Television's Ocean Rescue in 2008. In 2010, she joined BBC Look East as a weather presenter.

In 2019, Dolan moved from Norwich to Cromer in Norfolk.

== See also ==
- Jim Bacon (weather forecaster), fellow weather forecaster on Look East
