= Rani Price =

British television presenter

- Born: 29 January 1974 (age 52); Liverpool, England
- Occupation: Television presenter
- Known for: Best of Friends, ROAR

Rani Price (born Rani Ratna Khanijau 29 January 1974 in Liverpool) is a British television presenter who has presented a variety of children's shows for CBBC, Disney, Channel 5 and Nickelodeon.

== Television career ==
=== Early days ===
Born in Liverpool to Indian parents and the youngest of four children, Price studied Social science at university and toured schools in the north west of England with "Theatre in Education". She also ran drama classes and confidence workshops for young people.

=== Children's television ===
Her first appearance on CBBC was as a roving reporter for "CBBC Red Nose Day 2001". From 2004, she co-presented the children's game show Best of Friends with CBBC presenter Abs. She had a catchphrase of "no way" which she often said to people whilst speaking in the show. Since 2007, she has co-presented ROAR on the CBBC Channel. She became a popular face on the CBBC Channel where she presented links between programmes until October 2007, although returning briefly as a guest presenter in April 2010. She has also been a special guest on the art programme SMart and has presented Xchange on the CBBC Channel.

Price occasional reports and guest presents on Blue Peter following the 2011 revamp.

=== Other appearances ===
She co-presented BBC One's daytime property programmes To Buy or Not to Buy and "Don't Get Done Get Dom" she also appeared on Celebrity MasterChef in 2007 alongside fellow celebrities such as the dancer, Strictly Come Dancing judge Craig Revel Horwood, former English cricketer Phil Tufnell and the eventual winner, TV presenter and ex-EastEnders actress Nadia Sawalha. She also appeared on the BBC Three documentary Kill It, Cook It, Eat It. She and Fiona Foster presented Don't Get Done in the Sun from 20 to 31 May 2013.
