= Self-Made Man (book) =

Book by Norah Vincent

- Author: Norah Vincent
- Language: English
- Subject: Gender stereotypes
- Publication date: 2006
- Publication place: United States

Self-Made Man: My Year Disguised as a Man is a 2006 book by journalist Norah Vincent, recounting an 18-month experiment in which she disguised herself as a man and then integrated into traditionally male-only venues, such as a bowling league and a monastery. She described this as "a human project" about learning. She states at the beginning that she is a lesbian but not transgender.

== Content ==
In order to effectively pose as a man, Vincent acquired a buzz cut and flattened her chest using a small sports bra. She also hired a makeup artist to fake a five o'clock shadow and trained for months to imitate a deeper male voice. She changed her diet and exercise regimen to "bulk up" with more upper-body muscle.

She describes her experiences as a man in strip clubs, on dates, and as part of a man's support group.

She joined a men's bowling team, where she says, "[the men] just took me in ... no questions asked." She eventually became friends with them, even coming along to strip clubs and dating presumably straight women who had no idea of her true gender. She later revealed her true identity to the men, who "took it well".

She wrote about how the only time she had ever been considered excessively feminine was during her stint as a man: her alter ego, Ned, was assumed to be gay on several occasions. Features of herself that had before been seen as butch were seen as oddly effeminate. Vincent stated that, after the experiment, she gained more sympathy for the male condition: "Men are suffering. They have different problems than women have, but they don't have it better. They need our sympathy, they need our love, and they need each other more than anything else. They need to be together."

== Audiobook ==
Vincent also recorded Self-Made Man as an audiobook for Penguin Highbridge.

== See also ==
- Cross-dressing
- Nice guy
- Passing (gender)
- Undercover journalism
- Black Like Me Book documenting the white author's experiences while passing as Black
