= Undercover journalism =

Form of journalism

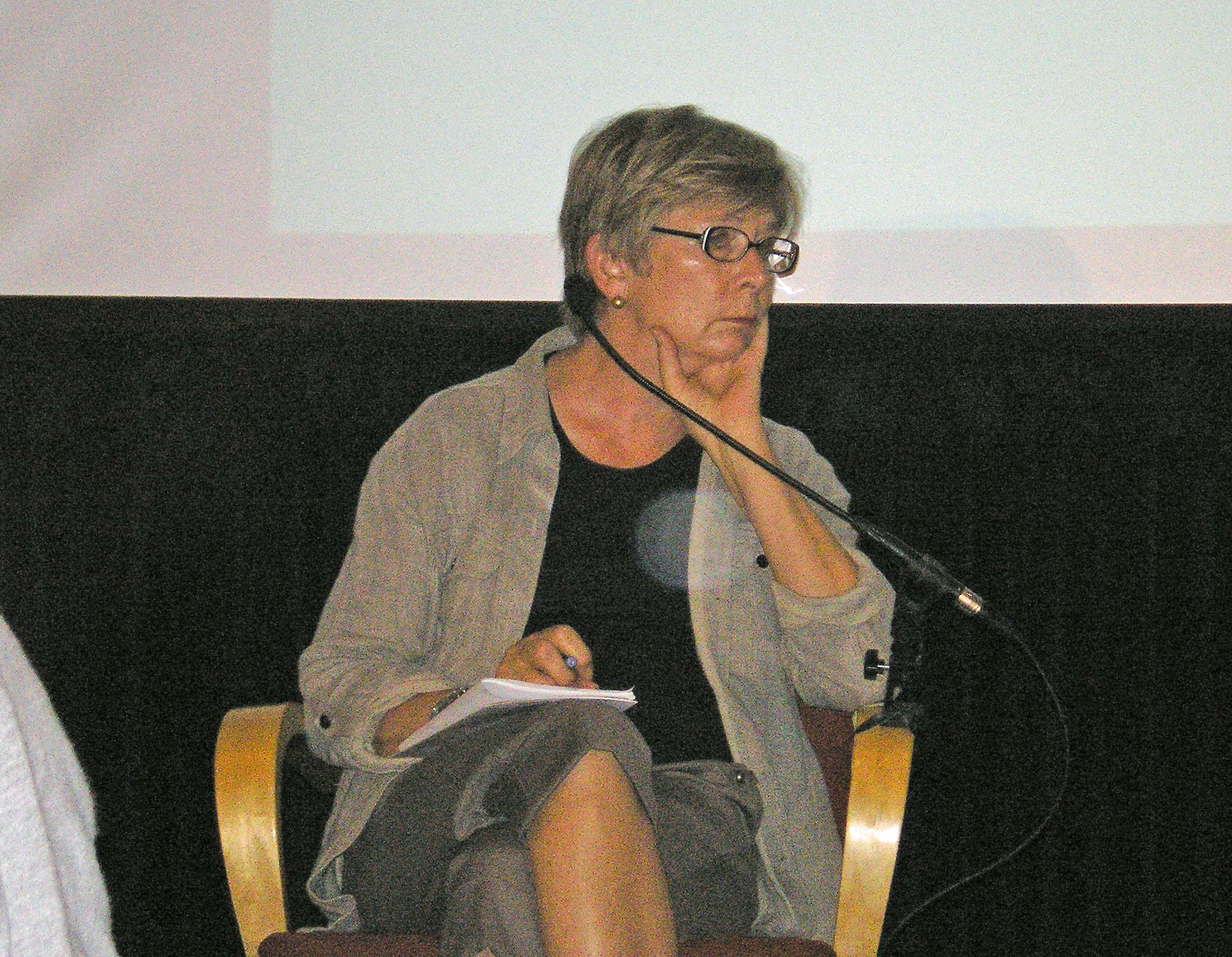
Barbara Ehrenreich

Undercover journalism is a form of journalism in which a reporter tries to infiltrate in a community by posing as somebody friendly to that community.

== Role ==
The role of undercover journalism has become the topic of much debate as moral and ethical lines have been crossed. The nine elements of journalism as outlined in a book by Bill Kovach and Tom Rosenstiel are as follows:

1. Journalism's first obligation is to tell the truth.
2. Its first loyalty is to the citizens.
3. Its essence is discipline of verification.
4. Its practitioners must maintain an independence from those they cover.
5. It must serve as an independent monitor of power.
6. It must provide a forum for public criticism and compromise.
7. It must strive to make the news significant, interesting, and relevant.
8. It must keep the news comprehensive and proportional.
9. Its practitioners must be allowed to exercise their personal conscience.

As reporters have gone undercover some of these guidelines have been bent and broken in order to uphold others on the list. Undercover reporting has brought to light numerous atrocities throughout history, yet often these reporters sacrifice ethical and moral code in the process.

== Ethics ==
While journalism aims to seek and report the truth, the ethics of how the truth is revealed should always be considered. If undercover journalism is an active lie to get the truth, then eventually trust can possibly be broken between reporters and the public. According to the Columbia Journalism Review, "Overreliance on sting operations and subterfuge can weaken the public's trust in the media and compromise journalists' claim to be truth-tellers. Undercover reporting can be a powerful tool, but it's one to be used cautiously: against only the most important targets, and even then only when accompanied by solid traditional reporting." Undercover journalism exposes a lot of truths that would otherwise stay under the radar. In the 1990s, ABC Primetime Live went undercover to investigate rumors of Food Lion's unsanitary practices. According to the Society of Professional Journalists’ Code of Ethics, "[j]ournalists should [...] [a]void undercover or other surreptitious methods of gathering information unless traditional, open methods will not yield information vital to the public.” Undercover journalism should be used scarcely and if it is used, then it should be done if there are no other options to get the information. It also should be accompanied by useful, interesting, and relevant information for the public.

== Notable undercover journalists ==
Journalists who are famous for their undercover reports include:

- Hunter S. Thompson
- Gloria Steinem
- Donal MacIntyre
- Alex Dolan
- Nellie Bly
- Pam Zekman
- Anas Aremeyaw Anas
- Günter Wallraff
- Ramita Navai
- 60 Minutes and Dateline NBC correspondents
- Barbara Ehrenreich (Nickel and Dimed)
- Carmelo Abbate

Elizabeth Jane Cochran, writing under the pseudonym Nellie Bly, became known for her undercover work for the New York World, titled Ten Days in a Mad-House, when she checked herself into an insane asylum as a patient to report on cruelty and neglect. After ten days she was released and later went on to help a grand jury prosecute the mental ward.

Gloria Steinem's "A Bunny's Tale," which ran in two parts in Show magazine in 1963, exposed exploitative working conditions in New York's Playboy Club. Steinem applied for a position at the club under an assumed name, got the job, and spent 11 days as a Playboy Bunny. The piece made her a celebrity and is considered a foundational text of second-wave feminism. As Steinem later wrote, "My exposé of working in a Playboy Club has outlived all the Playboy Clubs, both here and abroad."

Hunter S. Thompson was known for his undercover work reporting on the California-based motorcycle gang, the Hells Angels. His book, Hell's Angels: The Strange and Terrible Saga of the Outlaw Motorcycle Gangs, profiles the gang as Thompson spent roughly a year embedded among the Angels, during a time when their notoriety was at an all-time high.

Gunter Wallraff is a German journalist known for his undercover work, Ganz unten ("The lowest of the low"), on exposing the oppressive conditions faced by the immigrant workforce in Germany. He sought employment in German factories, pharmaceutical companies, and a wide array of odd jobs for roughly two years before publishing the book.

Donal MacIntyre is an Irish journalist who went undercover to expose employment standards in the Adventure Sports industry following the Lyme Bay canoeing disaster. He also won an award for his undercover work exposing drug dealers and private security firms that work in collusion after living in character for eleven months.

Alex Dolan is a journalist and science teacher best known for her undercover work exposing poor student behavior in her British classroom for the filming of a Channel 4* documentary Undercover Teacher.

Mazher Mahmood, the so-called "fake sheik", who won awards for his journalism and then was jailed for perjury.

Anas Aremeyaw Anas is a Ghanaian investigative journalist born in the late 1970s. Anas is famous for utilizing his anonymity as a tool in his investigation arsenal (very few people have seen his face). A multimedia journalist who specializes in print media and documentary, Anas focuses on issues of human rights and anti-corruption in Ghana and sub-Saharan Africa. Anas has won critical acclaim for his work advocating for the right to not be held in human slavery or servitude and to have a standard of living in the event of an illness. His investigative works have won him worldwide acclaim with President Barack Obama highlighting his virtues in a speech during his 2009 visit to Ghana: "An independent press. A vibrant private sector. A civil society. Those are the things that give life to democracy. We see that spirit in courageous journalists like Anas Aremeyaw Anas, who risked his life to report the truth." Anas has won over fourteen international awards for his investigative work. He was polled as the 5th most influential Ghanaian in 2011 by ETV, and named one of the "Most Influential Africans of the Year" by the New African Magazine, in December 2014. "Chameleon" a documentary about Anas' life and work by Ryan Mullins was premiered at the 2014 IDFA festival in Amsterdam.

== Books based on undercover projects ==
Related to this are books such as Black Like Me by John Howard Griffin, in which a white novelist dyed his skin black and traveled the southern United States, and Self-Made Man by Norah Vincent, a woman who dressed and passed herself off as a man. Gentleman's Agreement by Laura Z. Hobson is a fictional account of a gentile journalist who poses as a Jew to investigate antisemitism.

== See also ==
- Immersion journalism
