= St Aloysius' College, Highgate =

St Aloysius' College
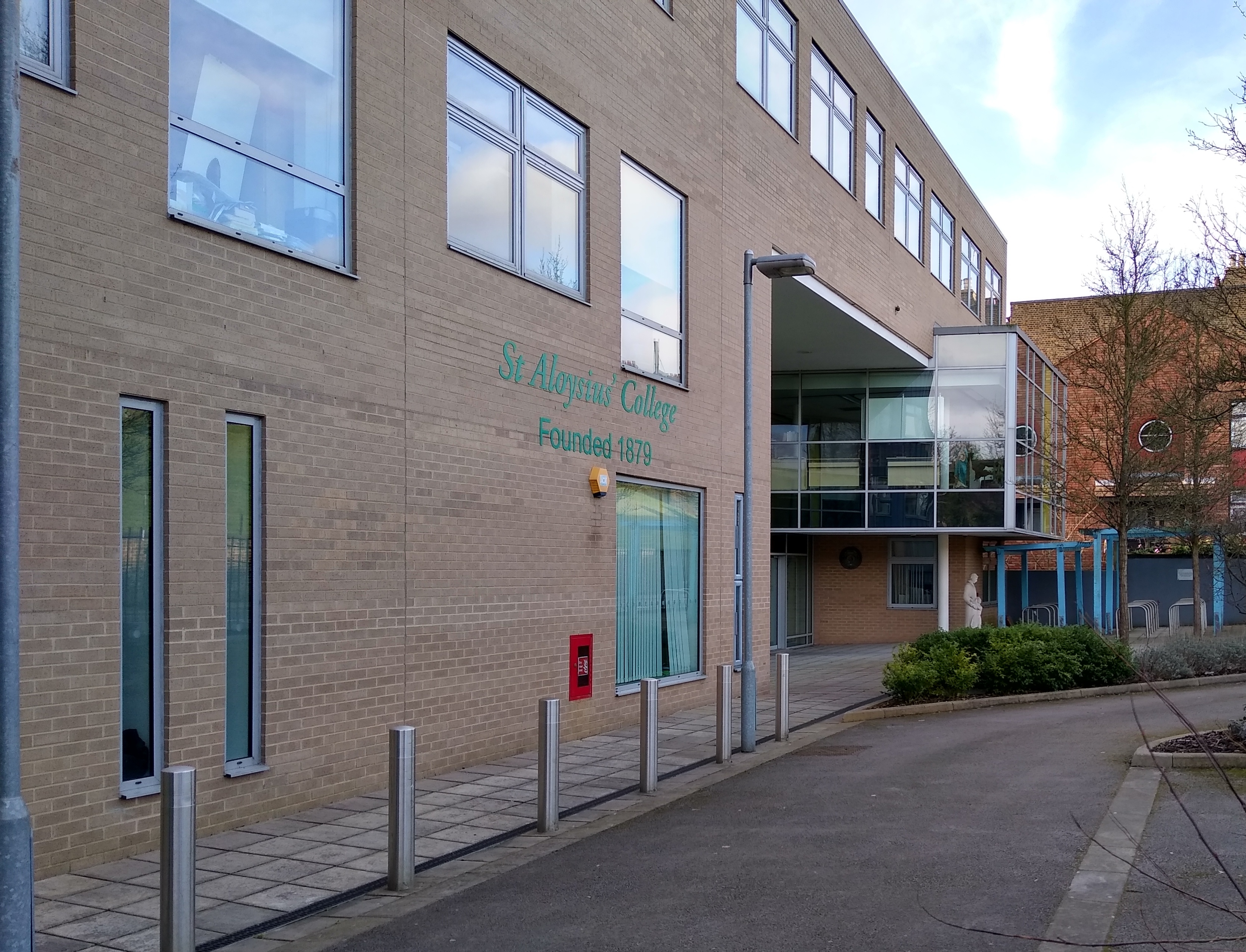

Location
- Hornsey Lane; Highgate, Greater London, N6 5LY; England; 51°34′11″N 0°08′20″W

Information
- Type: Voluntary aided comprehensive
- Motto: Latin: Beati Mundo Corde ("Blessed are the pure of heart")
- Religious affiliation: Roman Catholic
- Established: 1879; 147 years ago
- Local authority: Islington
- Department for Education URN: 100459 Tables
- Ofsted: Reports
- Head teacher: P. Whyte
- Gender: Boys; coeducational sixth form
- Age: 10 to 18
- Enrollment: 900 (approx.)
- Colour: Green
- Diocese: Westminster
- Website: www.sta.islington.sch.uk

St Aloysius' College is a Roman Catholic, co-educational state school in Highgate in the London Borough of Islington, England. Each year around 180 pupils are admitted to Year 7 (aged 11 or 12) on the basis of examination; the local education authority also assigns students without another school to this school. It is the oldest surviving foundation of its kind in the Archdiocese of Westminster.

== History ==
St Aloysius' College was founded in 1879 by the Brothers of Mercy as a Roman Catholic private boarding and day school and then a grammar school. The control of the college was passed to the De La Salle Brothers in 1960. It turned comprehensive in 1971 with the reorganisation of the English education system, and merged with local boys' comprehensive St. William of York in the 1980s.

The school went through a turbulent period during the 1990s with declining academic standards and the subsequent loss of its sixth form. It reopened the sixth form in September 2010 and admitted a small number of girls. It was awarded the Sportsmark and Artsmark awards. It also featured in a Dispatches special on Channel 4 TV documentary Undercover Teacher.

The school is used by the National Youth Theatre for many of its auditions and courses.

== Academics ==
Pupils usually take 10 or 11 GCSE subjects.

The sixth form is part of a collaboration of local schools in the area known as the Islington Sixth Form Consortium. Fourteen AS Level and four A2 subjects and a number of BTEC courses were available in 2012.

== Ofsted inspection ==
The school underwent Ofsted inspection in November 2018, receiving a Grade 3 ("Requires Improvement"). Effectiveness of leadership and management and personal development, behaviour and welfare were graded as 'good'. In 2022 they received a 'good'.

== Pupil protest ==
In 2019 year 10 to 13 pupils protested outside the school, leading to the school agreeing to review sixth formers' dress code, and an end to compulsory study time. Some parents supported their children, commenting on "petty behaviour rules" and the school not adhering to its policies.

== Notable former pupils ==
- Ronald Shiner (1903–1966) - actor
- John Cronin (1916–1986) - surgeon and Labour Party politician
- Peter Sellers (1925–1980) - actor
- John Harvey (b. 1938) - writer
- Michael Gambon (1940–2023) - actor
- James Herbert (1943–2013) - writer
- Danny Kelly (1956–2026) - journalist and broadcaster
- Gary Breen (b. 1973) - footballer
- Nonso Anozie (b. 1978) - actor
- Joe Cole (b. 1981) - footballer
- Tyrone Edgar (b. 1982) - sprinter
- Jabo Ibehre (b. 1983) - footballer, Oldham Athletic F.C., Colchester United F.C.
- Femi Oyeniran (b. 1986) - actor and director
- Dappy (b. 1987) - rapper and singer
- Daniel Kaluuya (b. 1989) - actor
- Moses Barnett (b. 1990) - footballer
- Bobson Bawling (b. 1995) - footballer, Crawley Town F.C.
- Armstrong Okoflex (b. 2002) - footballer, Celtic F.C.
- Samuel Iling-Junior (b. 2003) - Footballer Aston Villa FC
