= Richarda Morrow-Tait =

British aviatrix (1923–1982)

- Born: Prudence Richarda Eveleyn Routh; 22 November 1923; Ickleton, Cambridgeshire, England
- Died: 17 December 1982 (aged 59)
- Education: Perse School for Girls
- Known for: Aviatrix

Prudence Richarda Eveleyn "Dikki" Morrow-Tait (née Routh, 22 November 1923 – 17 December 1982) was an English pilot and the first woman to pilot an aircraft around the world, accomplishing the circumnavigation in a year and a day.

== Early life ==
Morrow-Tait was born in Ickleton, near Cambridge, Cambridgeshire. She was the youngest of three sisters. She was educated, between 1932 and 1940, at the Perse School for Girls in Cambridge.

"Dikki", as she was known, was inspired to fly while at school in the 1930s and began taking flying lessons at Cambridge Aero Club in January 1946, as soon as wartime restrictions allowed. She was the first person to receive a post-war civilian pilot's licence in the UK.

During the World War II, she was assigned as a temporary stenographer to assist an aeronautical mechanical engineer, Norman Morrow-Tait. On 21 July 1945, she married Morrow-Tait. In October 1946 they had a daughter, Anna. Despite some criticism, Morrow-Tait continued to fly following her daughter's birth.

== Round-the-world flight ==
On 18 August 1948, with about 85 hours of flying experience, and then 24 years old, she took off from Marshall Airport (now Cambridge City Airport) to Croydon, England, for the official departure point of the trip. The trip was intended to take six to eight weeks. She initially flew a single-engine Percival Proctor IV G-AJMU. She named the aircraft "Thursday's Child" (who "has far to go" in the nursery rhyme "Monday's Child"). For a navigator she was accompanied by childhood friend and Second World War RAF navigator Michael Townsend. The 25-year-old Townsend was then a University of Cambridge geography undergraduate student.

Their departure was not without controversy due to the social norms of the time, and the overwhelming reaction to her endeavour was a negative one. There was outrage that she would leave her 18-month-old girl behind. The press mockingly dubbed Morrow-Tait the "flying housewife."

They travelled by the south-eastern route. Passing south through France, then along the Mediterranean, through the Middle East to India and on to Vietnam, before turning north-east to Hong Kong and Japan. There were rough landings in Marseille (causing minor damage) and Cyprus. They also had to wait nearly seven weeks in Calcutta, India, to replace the engine and finding and getting approval for extra fuel tanks to be installed in the fuselage for the long flight across the Pacific Ocean.

On reaching Japan, they were denied permission to cross Russia or use Russian airfields, lengthening their Pacific crossing. With winter approaching, they were offered an escort by an American Boeing B-17 Flying Fortress from Japan. They made the Pacific crossing on 9 November 1948; however, poor weather and radio issues meant they lost contact with their escort. They eventually reached Shemya Air Force Base in the Aleutians 13 hours and 20 minutes later, perilously low on fuel. They reportedly arrived as the B-17 was preparing to go and search for them, assuming them to be lost. They continued on to the North American mainland and on 21 November 1948, they took off from Anchorage, Alaska. However, the engine developed trouble and they were forced to land on the snow-covered Alaska Highway near Tok, Alaska. The situation looked bleak. They were nearly out of funds, and the aircraft was unrepairable.

Townsend returned to England to complete his studies, while Morrow-Tait set about trying to raise money to continue her journey. Morrow-Tait spent four months fundraising for a new aeroplane, giving lectures, radio interviews and singing in a nightclub in Edmonton, Canada. Impressed by her resolve, some Americans started a fundraising drive, and she was able to buy a 1942 Vultee Valiant (NX54084), which she christened "Next Thursday's Child".

While in Seattle trying to raise funds, she met Jack Ellis, another former RAF navigator, who joined her for the next three months as navigator. Restarting her trip on 9 April, but leaking fuel tanks slowed her progress, along with paperwork issues with both customs in Minneapolis and the Civil Aeronautics administration in Chicago. There were stops (and more paperwork problems) in Canada. Morrow-Tait reunited with Townsend in June 1949, flying via Goose Bay, Labrador. Canadian officials reportedly told her to go home and 'look after her baby,' while denying her permission to set off on the transatlantic leg. On 12 August, they departed Goose Bay, saying they were going to Dow Air Force Base in Bangor, Maine, out of Canadian airspace and away from the Atlantic. The Royal Canadian Air Force sent a Avro Lancaster from Nova Scotia to escort them and see that they complied. But Morrow-Tait had other ideas and in-flight turned towards Bluie West One in southern Greenland, followed all the way by the Lancaster. They then flew via Iceland to Prestwick, Scotland. On 19 August 1949, at 6:40 PM they reached Croydon.

There was little in the way of public notice of the completion of the journey with the press reporting "only a few persons" were at Croydon.

== Later life ==
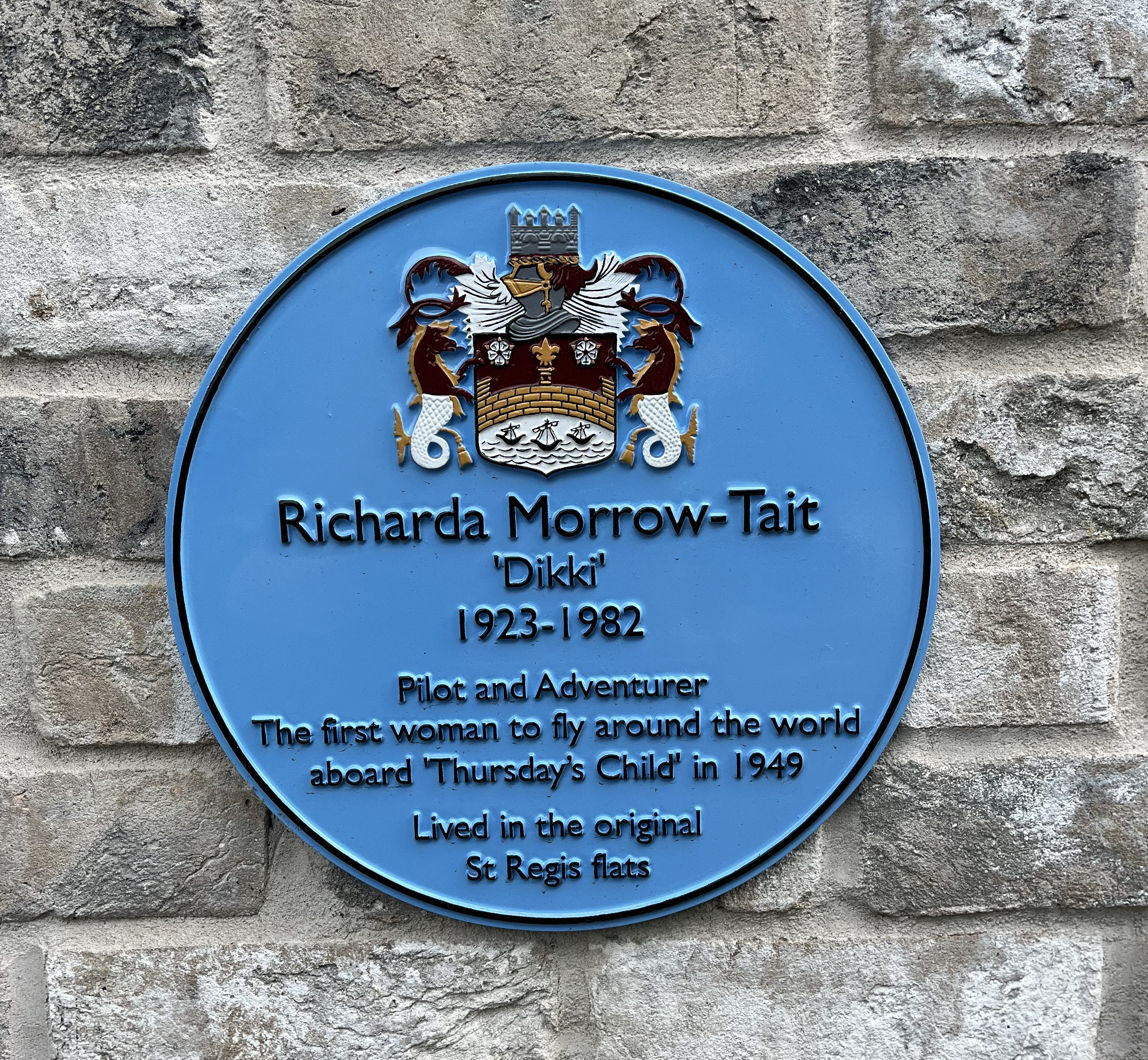
Richarda Morrow-Tait ‘Dikki’ (1923-1982) - Blue plaque on Chesterton Road, Cambridge

During the trip, Townsend and Richarda Morrow-Tait had an affair, and eight months after their return, Townsend and Morrow-Tait had a son, Giles Townsend. On 2 February 1951, Norman Morrow-Tait was granted a divorce. Townsend and Richarda Morrow-Tait married on 27 March 1951.

She maintained her pilot licence until 1960 and died on 17 December 1982 of a blood disease aged 59.

Until 2022 Morrow-Tait was the youngest woman pilot to circumnavigate the globe. As of 2024, she remains the youngest woman pilot to circumnavigate the globe with a navigator.

In 2024, a blue plaque was placed at Cambridge City Airport in honour of the 75th anniversary of her flight around the world.
