= James Runcie =

English novelist, documentary filmmaker, television producer, and playwright

The Honourable James Runcie FRSL
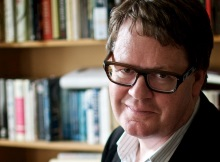
- Born: 7 May 1959 (age 67); Cambridge, England
- Education: Trinity Hall, Cambridge
- Occupations: Novelist; documentary filmmaker; television producer; theatre director
- Spouse: Marilyn Imrie (m. 1985; died 2020) Lucinda Bredin (m. 2025)
- Children: 1 daughter, 1 stepdaughter
- Parent(s): Robert Runcie; Rosalind Runcie

James Robert Runcie FRSL (born 7 May 1959) is a British novelist, documentary filmmaker, television producer and playwright. He is a Fellow of the Royal Society of Literature and a visiting professor at Bath Spa University and was Commissioning Editor for Arts on BBC Radio 4 from 2016 to 2020.

== Early life and education ==
Runcie was born in Cambridge, the son of Robert Runcie, later Archbishop of Canterbury, and Rosalind Runcie, a classical pianist. He was educated at the Dragon School in Oxford, Marlborough College, and Trinity Hall, Cambridge.

In 1981, he earned a First Class English degree from the University of Cambridge. After Cambridge, Runcie went on to attend Bristol Old Vic Theatre School briefly.

== Writing ==
Runcie has written the novels The Discovery of Chocolate (2001), The Colour of Heaven (2003), Canvey Island (2006), East Fortune (2009) and The Great Passion (2022).

In 2012, the publication of Sidney Chambers and the Shadow of Death drew a favourable critical reception. The book, which consists of six short stand-alone mysteries, is the first in a series of six works of detective fiction, entitled The Grantchester Mysteries. The second, Sidney Chambers and the Perils of the Night, was published in 2013. The third, Sidney Chambers and the Problem of Evil, was published in 2014, followed by Sidney Chambers and the Forgiveness of Sins in 2015 and then Sidney Chambers and the Dangers of Temptation in 2016. The series concluded with Sidney Chambers and the Persistence of Love in 2017, but a prequel, The Road to Grantchester, was published in 2019.

Runcie's prequel to The Grantchester Mysteries, The Road to Grantchester is set in the years from 1943 to 1951 and features Sidney Chambers' war-service with the Scots Guards in Italy, his first main love, his decision to become a clergyman, and his curacy amidst the ruins of post-war Coventry. It was published in March 2019.

Runcie is published by Bloomsbury Publishing. His sleuth novels have been adapted as an ITV drama titled Grantchester. Filmed on location in Grantchester, Cambridge and London, the initial six-part series was shown in the UK in the autumn of 2014. The second to fifth series were broadcast in 2016, 2017, 2019, and 2020 respectively.

Runcie also writes lifestyle pieces about family and literature for major UK newspapers.

== Work in media ==
From 1983 to 1985, Runcie worked in radio drama for BBC Scotland as a writer and director. His work included Miss Julie, The White Devil, Roderick Hudson, Men Should Weep, and A Private Grief.

More recently, Runcie has produced Arts, Music, and History programmes for the BBC. He is a freelance director of documentary films, and has produced documentaries featuring the writers Hilary Mantel, J. K. Rowling and J. G. Ballard, as well as making My Father, filmed a week before Robert Runcie's death, and the six-part series How Buildings Learn. He works freelance for the BBC, ITV, and Channel 4. He has worked with presenters including David Starkey, Griff Rhys Jones, Andrew Motion, Alain de Botton, and Simon Schama.

In 2009, Runcie was appointed Artistic Director of the Bath Literature Festival. He left the post in 2013 to take up a position as Head of Literature and Spoken Word at the Southbank Centre in London.

J.K. Rowling: A Year in the Life

From October 2006 to October 2007, Runcie spent a year filming J.K. Rowling: A Year in the Life for ITV, as the author was completing the final novel in the Harry Potter cycle, Harry Potter and the Deathly Hallows. The programme featured intimate access to Rowling's daily life, and included deeply personal interviews by Runcie with Rowling. Runcie narrated the film; when it was shown in the United States, additional commentary was provided by Elizabeth Vargas. This film was transmitted on 30 December 2007 by ITV and included in the Harry Potter and the Half-Blood Prince DVD as a supplement.

== Awards ==
Runcie won a Royal Television Society award for his film Miss Pym's Day Out in 1992, starring Patricia Routledge as the novelist Barbara Pym, and he has also received Royal Television Society nominations for How Buildings Learn and The Gentle Art of Making Enemies. Miss Pym's Day Out was also nominated for a BAFTA Huw Wheldon Award for the Best Arts Programme in 1992.

He won two BAFTA Scotland Radio Drama Awards for Watching Waiters and Mrs Lynch's Maggot, and he was nominated for a BAFTA award for the film Great Composers – Bach.

He was elected a Fellow of the Royal Society of Literature in 2016.

== Personal life ==
In 1985 Runcie married the theatre director and radio drama producer Marilyn Imrie, who died in 2020. They had one daughter together, Charlotte Runcie (born 1989), who currently writes as a literary, television and radio critic for the Daily Telegraph.

He is also stepfather to Imrie's daughter Rosie Kellagher (born 1978), who is a freelance theatre director. In 2025, Runcie married journalist Lucinda Bredin.

== Bibliography ==
=== The Grantchester Mysteries (aka the Sidney Chambers series) ===
- Sidney Chambers and The Shadow of Death (2012) (short story collection)
- Sidney Chambers and The Perils of the Night (2013) (short story collection)
- Sidney Chambers and The Problem of Evil (2014) (short story collection)
- Sidney Chambers and The Forgiveness of Sins (2015) (short story collection)
- Sidney Chambers and The Dangers of Temptation (2016) (short story collection)
- Sidney Chambers and The Persistence of Love (2017) (short story collection)
- The Road to Grantchester (2019) (prequel novel)

=== Novels ===
- The Colour of Heaven (2000)
- The Discovery of Chocolate (2001)
- Canvey Island (2006)
- East Fortune (2009)
- The Great Passion (2022)

=== Non-fiction ===
- Tell Me Good Things: On Love, Death, and Marriage (2022)
