= Rosalind Runcie =

British musician (1932–2012)

Angela Rosalind Runcie, Baroness Runcie (née Turner; 23 January 1932 – 12 January 2012) was an English classical pianist and the wife of Robert Runcie, Archbishop of Canterbury.

== Family and early life ==
Runcie's father was J. W. Cecil Turner, a Worcestershire county cricketer and a recipient of the Military Cross, who served as the bursar of Trinity Hall, Cambridge. She was educated at the Perse School for Girls, Cambridge and the London Guildhall School of Music.

She married Robert Runcie on 5 September 1957. They had two children, James (born 1959) and Rebecca Runcie (born 1962).

== Later life ==
Robert Runcie was appointed Bishop of St Albans in 1970. In 1974, Michael Ramsey, Archbishop of Canterbury, was scheduled to retire in November. His successor was to be appointed by Harold Wilson, Prime Minister of the United Kingdom. In April, Ladbrokes had already announced the betting odds as to who the next archbishop would be: Robert Runcie was considered a likely candidate. Rosalind Runcie was reported by Time magazine to have disapproved of the process: "It's revolting to turn important church affairs into a horse race." The archbishop appointed was Donald Coggan, Archbishop of York, whom Ladbrokes had considered a leading candidate. That same year Robert Runcie was offered the position which Coggan had vacated, that of the Archbishop of York. She was reportedly set against moving from St Albans, Hertfordshire to York, North Yorkshire, resulting in her husband turning down the offer. When Coggan retired as Archbishop of Canterbury, Robert Runcie was appointed as his successor and installed in the position in 1980. His acceptance of the position was reportedly delayed for weeks because of her alleged opposition to moving from St Albans (in this case to Lambeth Palace, the London base of the Archbishop of Canterbury).

Runcie continued to give piano recitals in both the United Kingdom and the United States. According to an article in the Wrexham Evening Leader in 1983, she had raised over £60,000 for charity through her recitals. She was interested in gardening and redesigned the gardens at Lambeth Palace in 1986.

During the 1980s, the Early Diagnostic Unit for breast cancer of The Royal Marsden NHS Foundation Trust was threatened with closure. Runcie and June Kenton, owner of the Rigby & Peller shop, which has received a Royal Warrant for custom-making the brassieres of Elizabeth II of the United Kingdom, organised a petition for its continued existence, gathering thousands of signatures. Their petition was delivered to Norman Fowler, Secretary of State for Work and Pensions, who withdrew the notice of closure.

In 1987, she was featured in articles of the Daily Star, a daily British tabloid newspaper. She took legal action against the publisher under English defamation law. The case reportedly concluded with a settlement in her favour. In 1988, she was named Honorary President of the Anglo-Armenian Association.

== Later years and death ==
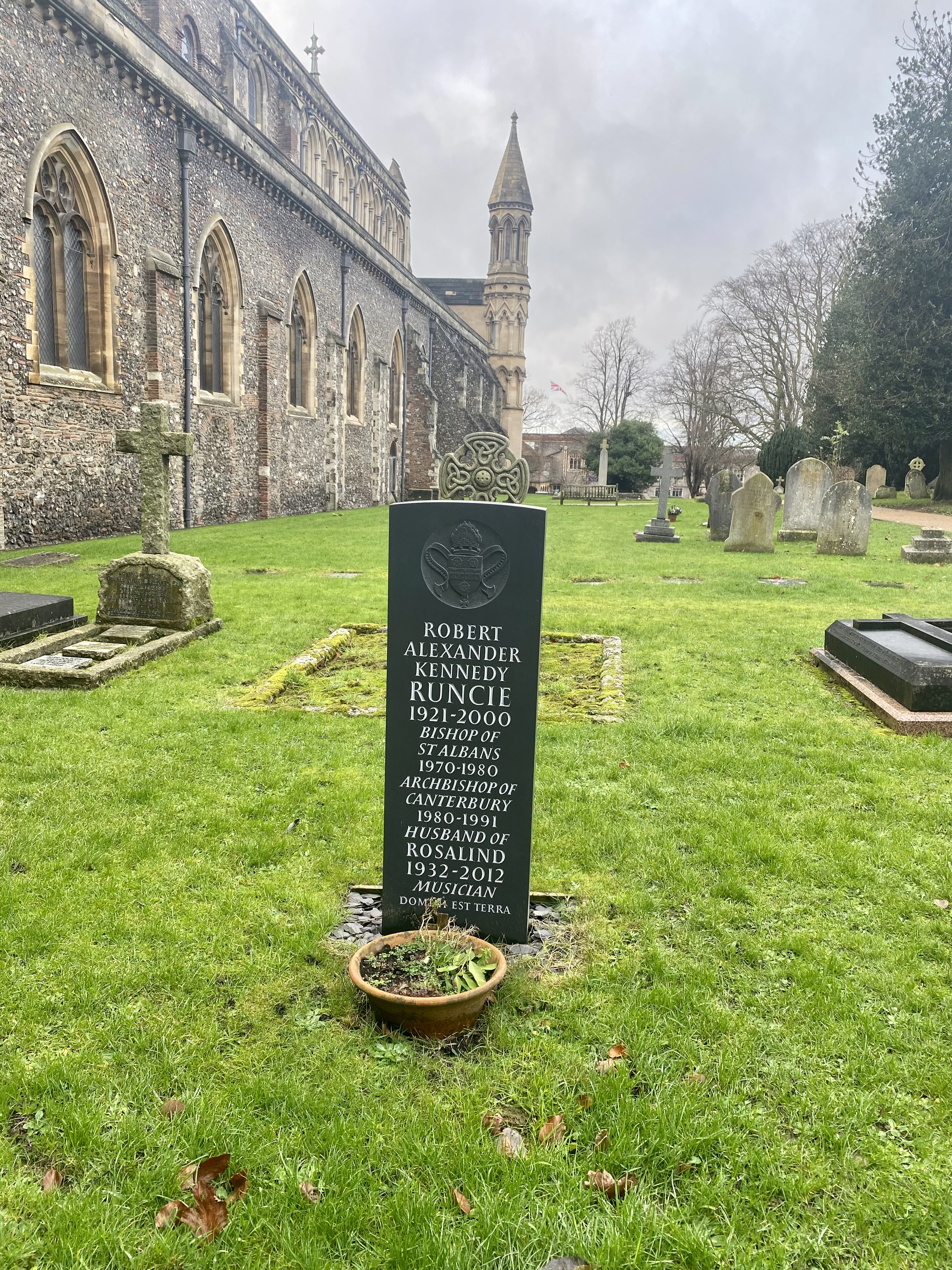

Runcie lived in St Albans (in which city she had lived in the 1970s during her husband's time as Bishop of St Albans) and taught piano privately and at St Albans School and St Albans High School for Girls.

Robert Runcie died on 11 July 2000. Lady Runcie died on 12 January 2012, 11 days before her 80th birthday.

== Sources ==
- Carpenter, Humphrey, Robert Runcie: The Reluctant Archbishop. Hodder & Stoughton, 1996. ISBN 0-340-57107-1.
