= Robert Runcie =

Archbishop of Canterbury from 1980 to 1991

The Most Reverend and Right Honourable Robert Runcie MC PC
- Archbishop of Canterbury
- Runcie in 1981
- Church: Church of England
- Province: Canterbury
- Diocese: Canterbury
- Installed: 25 March 1980
- Term ended: 31 January 1991
- Predecessor: Donald Coggan
- Successor: George Carey
- Other post: Primate of All England
- Previous post: Bishop of St Albans (1970–1980)

Orders
- Ordination: 24 December 1950 (deacon); December 1951 (priest) by Noel Hudson
- Consecration: 24 February 1970 by Michael Ramsey

Personal details
- Born: Robert Alexander Kennedy Runcie; 2 October 1921 Birkenhead, England
- Died: 11 July 2000 (aged 78) St Albans, Hertfordshire, England
- Buried: St Albans Cathedral
- Denomination: Anglican
- Spouse: Rosalind Turner (m. 1957)
- Children: 2, including James
- Education: Brasenose College, Oxford; Westcott House, Cambridge

Member of the House of Lords
- Lord Temporal
- Life peerage 1 February 1991 – 11 July 2000
- Lord Spiritual
- In office 21 February 1973 – 31 January 1991

Robert Alexander Kennedy Runcie, Baron Runcie, MC, PC (2 October 1921 – 11 July 2000) was an English Anglican bishop. He was the Archbishop of Canterbury from 1980 to 1991, having previously been Bishop of St Albans. He travelled the world widely to spread ecumenicism and worked to foster relations with both Protestant and Catholic churches across Europe. He was a leader of the Liberal Anglo-Catholicism movement. He came under attack for expressing compassion towards bereaved Argentines after the Falklands War of 1982, and generated controversy by supporting women's ordination.

Biographer Adrian Hastings argues that Runcie was not a distinguished writer or thinker, but was a good administrator who made shrewd appointments, demanded quality, and recognised good performances.

== Early life ==
Robert Alexander Kennedy Runcie was born on 2 October 1921 in Birkenhead, Cheshire, the youngest of four children of Robert Dalziel Runcie, chief electrical engineer at the Tate and Lyle sugar refinery at Liverpool, and his wife Ann Edna (known as "Nancy"), née Benson. His middle-class parents were rather non-religious; his father was 'fond of bowls and golf'. He spent his early life in Great Crosby, Lancashire, and initially attended St Luke's Church, Crosby (where he was confirmed in 1936), before switching to the Anglo-Catholic St Faith's Church about a mile down the road. He was educated at Merchant Taylors' Boys' School, Crosby, before going to Brasenose College, Oxford.

During the Second World War he was commissioned as a second lieutenant into the Scots Guards on 21 November 1942, and was given the service number 251985. He served with the regiment's 3rd (Tank) Battalion, then part of the 6th Guards Tank Brigade, as a tank commander, landing in Normandy with his unit as part of Operation Overlord in July 1944, a few weeks after the D-Day landings on 6 June, and fought with the battalion throughout the entire North West Europe Campaign until Victory in Europe Day (VE Day) in May 1945. Towards the end of the war, he earned the Military Cross (MC) for two feats of bravery in March 1945: he rescued one of his men from a crippled tank under heavy enemy fire, and the next day took his own tank into an exceptionally exposed position in order to knock out three anti-tank guns. As a result, he is unique among modern archbishops of Canterbury in having fought for his country. In May 1945, he was among the first British soldiers to enter the Bergen-Belsen concentration camp.

After the surrender of Nazi Germany, Runcie served with the occupying forces in Cologne and then with the boundary commission dealing with the future status of the Free Territory of Trieste.

On his return to Oxford, he surprised many by taking first-class honours in Greats. He was a member of both Conservative and socialist societies at Oxford, and through that he had his first dealings with the young Margaret Thatcher (then Margaret Roberts), a relationship which was to prove pivotal during his archiepiscopate.

== Ordained ministry ==
Runcie studied for ordination at Westcott House, Cambridge, where he received a diploma rather than a second bachelor's degree in theology. He was made deacon in Advent 1950 and ordained priest the following Advent, both times by Noel Hudson, Bishop of Newcastle, at Newcastle Cathedral, to serve as a curate in the parish of All Saints in the wealthy Newcastle upon Tyne suburb of Gosforth, then a rapidly growing suburban area. Rather than the conventional minimum three-year curacy, after two years Runcie was invited to return to Westcott House as chaplain and, later, vice-principal. In 1956 he was elected fellow and dean of Trinity Hall, Cambridge, where he met his future wife, Rosalind, the daughter of the college bursar.

In 1960, he returned to the world of the theological college, becoming principal of Cuddesdon College, near Oxford, and vicar of the local parish church (Church of All Saints, Cuddesdon). He spent 10 years there and transformed what had been a rather monastic and traditionally Anglo-Catholic institution into a stronghold of the liberal Catholic tradition of the Church of England. In this period, his name became more and more strongly spoken of as a future bishop, and speculation was confirmed when he was appointed Bishop of St Albans in 1970. He was duly consecrated a bishop on 24 February 1970 by Michael Ramsey, the then Archbishop of Canterbury, at Westminster Abbey.

Like Gosforth in the 1950s, the Diocese of St Albans was a booming suburban area, popular with families moving out of a depopulating London. As well as diocesan work, he worked with broadcasters as chairman of the Central Religious Advisory Committee, and was appointed chairman of the joint Anglican–Orthodox Commission.

=== Archbishop of Canterbury ===
Runcie was selected as Archbishop of Canterbury in 1979, as Donald Coggan approached his retirement from the see. There is evidence that Runcie was the second choice of the Crown Appointments Commission, the first choice, Hugh Montefiore, having proven politically unacceptable to the then newly elected Conservative government. He was installed as archbishop on 25 March 1980.

During his time as Archbishop of Canterbury he witnessed a breaking down of traditionally convivial relations between the Church of England – which had often been described as "the Tory party at prayer" – and the Conservative (i.e. Tory) Party. The breakdown was due mainly to the church's pronouncements on political matters and Margaret Thatcher's support for the ethos of individualism and wealth creation as well as her words in 1987 which were misquoted as a claim that "there is no such thing as society" (although her exact words, from a magazine interview, were "who is 'society'? There is no such thing!"), which some Anglicans thought was uncaring and anti-Christian.

In 1981, Runcie officiated at the marriage of Charles, Prince of Wales, to Lady Diana Spencer.

Runcie attempted to give a service at St Nicholas's Parish Church in Liverpool on 11 March 1982, but was heckled by people upset about the Pope's prospective visit to Britain. They shouted that Runcie was a traitor, a liar and was a traitor to the Church of England. After interruptions of the service, Runcie asked the congregation to heed chapter five of St Matthew's Gospel (the Sermon on the Mount), telling them "For they are the words of Jesus himself". Reportedly, one member of the crowd replied: "You had better read your Bible yourself. You are a traitor and a Judas." Outside, demonstrators held placards with the inscriptions "Rome Rules Runcie", "Our Faith Our Bible", "Revive Reformation", "Calvary not Popery" and "Jesus What More". Afterwards, Runcie said: "I am trying my best to find forgiveness for them, but it is very upsetting." Cardinal Basil Hume called the demonstration "particularly abhorrent and a scandal".

On 17 March 1982, Runcie gave a speech to the National Society for Promoting Religious Education in which he said that Christianity should play a crucial part in the religious education of all pupils, even if they were non-Christian: "While recognising that a truly pluralistic society should not merely tolerate diversity but value and nurture it, I must also express the fear that at times we seem tempted to sacrifice too much of our native Christian tradition on the altar of multi-culturalism."

In a gesture of goodwill, he knelt in prayer with Pope John Paul II in Canterbury Cathedral during John Paul's visit to the United Kingdom in 1982.

On 18 April 1982, Runcie said in an interview with London Weekend Television that he hoped the Church of England and the Roman Catholic Church would be unified by 2000: "I dream of unity with Rome, and with the great Reform tradition and with the Orthodox, by the end of the century, but we will have to get a move on, certainly, if that is our target. I don't see why we should not have that target." Runcie said of the office of Pope: "There is advantage in having a central focus of affection, even a central spokesman to articulate what the churches in different parts of the world are thinking. I think Anglicans recognise that there is value in that sort of concept". He also played down the Queen's role as Supreme Governor of the Church of England:

Our entanglement with Crown and Parliament is not very considerable now. The Queen's position in the life of our church is very much a symbolic position. She is, as it were, a chief lay person in our church rather than somebody who has a decisive voice in all our appointments.

In 1985, there was friction between the Church of England and members of the Conservative government, in particular Norman Tebbit, over a church report, Faith in the City, which criticised the government's handling of social problems in British inner-city areas. Tebbit became a strong supporter of the disestablishment of the Church of England, claiming that institutions affiliated to the British state should not express what he saw as overtly partisan political views.

Much of the middle period of Runcie's archiepiscopate was taken up with the tribulations of two men who had been close to him: the suicide of Gareth Bennett and the kidnapping of Terry Waite.

When Runcie visited Pope John Paul II in 1989, he set out to reconcile the Church of England with the Church of Rome. Runcie advocated the papacy as having a "primacy of honour" rather than "primacy of jurisdiction" over the Anglican churches, a proposal consistent with the report of the Anglican–Roman Catholic International Commission. The Pope did not go along with this, however, claiming that the papacy already has primacy of jurisdiction over all other churches regardless of whether or not this is officially recognised and also that the doctrines of the Roman Catholic Church would not change to accommodate Runcie's proposals.

In internal Anglican matters, much of Runcie's time as archbishop was taken up with the debate over whether to proceed with the ordination of women in the Church of England as well as the fallout from the ordination of women as priests and bishops in other parts of the Anglican Communion. Runcie's position on the matter had been described as "nailing his colours firmly to the fence" – his liberal theology conflicting with his instinctive conservatism.

The church's attitude to homosexuality was also a divisive issue during this period, although it did not assume the crisis proportions it would in the late 1990s and early 2000s. In public Runcie stuck to official Church of England policy, as set out in the publication Issues in Human Sexuality, that homosexual practice was not ideal for lay people and unacceptable for clergy.

== Retirement and death ==
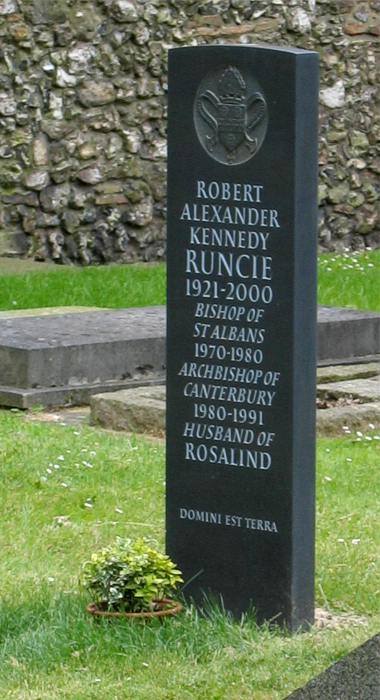
Runcie's grave at St Albans Cathedral

Runcie retired as Archbishop of Canterbury on 31 January 1991. The following day, he was created a life peer – gazetted on 7 February as Baron Runcie, of Cuddesdon, in the County of Oxfordshire – which enabled him to re-enter the House of Lords, where he had previously sat as a Lord Spiritual. He died of cancer on 11 July 2000, aged 78, in St Albans, and was buried in the grounds of St Albans Cathedral.

== Family ==
Runcie's wife, Rosalind, whom he married on 5 September 1957, was well-known as a pianist. They had two children: James Runcie, a novelist, and Rebecca Runcie. Rosalind died on 12 January 2012.

== Arms ==
Coat of arms of Robert Runcie
Coronet Coronet of a Baron Crest A Horse statant Argent crined maned unguled and the tail Sable gorged with a Chaplet of Roses Gules barbed and seeded proper resting the dexter foreleg upon a Millrind Gold Escutcheon Argent on a Fess Sable between three Roses Gules barbed and seeded proper as many Crosses Patonce also Argent

== See also ==
- Richard Chartres, Bishop of London from 1995 to 2017, who was Runcie's chaplain in the 1970s and 1980s at both St Albans and subsequently Canterbury

Church of England titles
Preceded by Michael Gresford Jones	Bishop of St Albans; 1970–1980	Succeeded by John Taylor
Preceded by Donald Coggan	Archbishop of Canterbury; 1980–1991	Succeeded by George Carey
Academic offices
Preceded by Edward Knapp-Fisher	Principal of Cuddesdon College; 1960–1970	Succeeded by Leslie Houlden as Principal of Ripon College Cuddesdon
