= Lowest of the Low (book) =

1985 German book

- Author: Günter Wallraff
- Genre: Undercover journalism
- Publication date: 1985
- Publication place: Germany
- ISBN: 9780413196804

Lowest of the Low or Lowest of the Low: the Turkish worker in West Germany is the English translation of German journalist Günter Wallraff’s book Ganz unten (“At the very bottom”), originally published in Germany in 1985. The book describes his undercover experiment as a Turkish migrant worker in West Germany over the span of two years.

== Overview ==
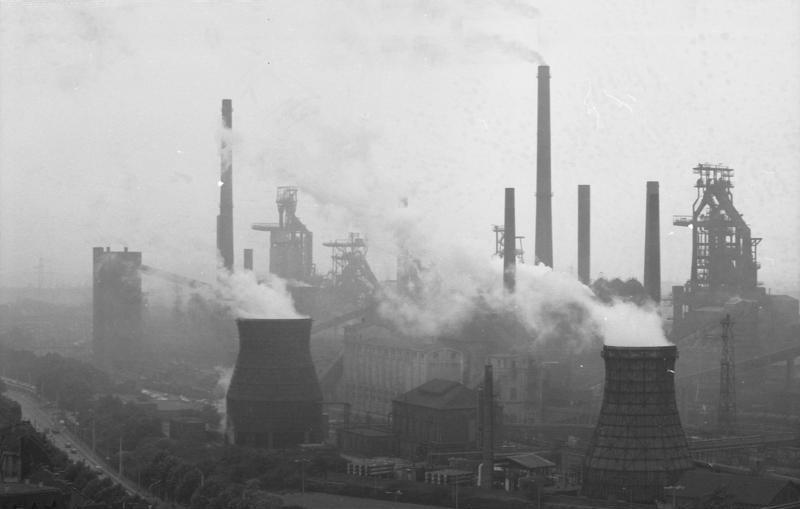
The Thyssen steel factory in which Wallraff worked

Wallraff assumes the identity of a Turkish man named Ali Sinirlioğlu. Wallraff opts to disguise himself for his experiment. He alters his appearance by wearing contact lenses and a wig to make himself appear younger, and additionally adopts what he considers to be a stereotypical cartoon accent and affect.

Wallraff publishes an ad in a newspaper as Ali Sigirlioğlu, stating his willingness to work any job, including hard labor. He takes on various jobs as an unqualified worker, including work as a farmhand, a McDonald’s fast food worker, and as a worker in a Thyssen steel factory. Wallraff concludes his undercover experiment after two years as a result of the physical strain and health problems the various jobs caused him.

== Conclusions and observations ==
Wallraff’s conclusions from his experiment reflect the xenophobic treatment and exploitation he faced while playing the role of a young Turkish migrant worker. He underlines the risks he experiences, such as an employers lacking protective equipment for workers, poor work environments and the low wages offered to migrant workers. Wallraff also notes how the laborers are treated like disposable tools and not people. He also included some reports from other people who worked in nuclear fuel manufacturing.

He recounts the social isolation he faced as a Turkish man, describing various incidents where individuals would insult, berate or threaten him without provocation.

== Reception ==
The book was very successful upon publication, with more than four million copies being sold within the original German run, and being translated into 30 languages and distributed in several countries. It became Germany’s largest literary post-World War II success.

The publication of Wallraff’s book increased the European public’s interest in the mistreatment and social isolation of foreign workers. There were also investigations into illegal employment agencies as a result.

In an effort to help foreigners, Günter Wallraff created “Ausländersolidarität” (“Solidarity with Foreigners”), a fund to assist newcomers in Germany.
